= Silver Badge Party =

Defunct veterans' political movement in the United Kingdom

The Silver War Badge, also known as the Services Rendered Badge, from which the movement took its name

The Silver Badge Party was an unofficial political movement which existed in the United Kingdom during and immediately after the First World War. The Party consisted of several groups representing the political interests of former service personnel. It took its name from the Silver War Badge (SWB) that was issued to servicemen who had been invalided out of the forces.

== History ==
First to be formed was the National Association of Discharged Sailors and Soldiers (NADSS), established following a meeting in Blackburn in September 1916 and initially linked to the labour and trade union movement. In April 1917, the Asquith Liberal MP James Myles Hogge sponsored a meeting at the National Liberal Club over the Military Service (Review of Exceptions) Bill, which proposed to reclassify those invalided out of the army to identify those who might be recalled to service. This meeting led to the formation of the National Federation of Discharged and Demobilised Sailors and Soldiers (NFDSS).

The NFDSS decided to fight by-elections to put its message across. In the Liverpool Abercromby byelection in June 1917, the NFDSS candidate polled a quarter of the vote. In the 1918 general election its National Executive approved five candidates, and local branches sponsored 25 more, considered Independent NFDSS candidates. In three Leeds constituencies, the candidates were nominated jointly by the NFDSS, the NADSS and the Comrades of the Great War. None of the candidates were elected although many polled substantial votes. In addition, the NADSS sponsored a candidate, Robert Hewitt Barker, in Sowerby in unusual circumstances, in which he inherited the position of unofficial Conservative Party candidate and won.

The groups were politically diverse. Hogge was a left-wing Liberal, and most of the NFDSS were similarly left wing: among the NFDSS candidates was Ernest Thurtle, who later became a Labour Party MP. Henry Hamilton Beamish was a member of both the Vigilante Society and the NFDSS. In the 1918 general election he was one of the candidates sponsored by the NFDSS branches but not approved by the NFDSS National Executive, again in Clapham.

Following the election, none of the groups continued in active party politics. Hogge resigned as President of the NFDSS in January 1919. Following pressure from Douglas Haig, the NFDSS lifted its ban on officers being members in June 1919 and the three groups together with the Officers' Association began merger talks. At a Unity conference on 14–15 May 1921, they merged to form The Royal British Legion.
