= Gledhill =

Gledhill is a surname. Notable people with the surname include:

- Adam Gledhill (born 1993), English rugby league player
- Ben Gledhill (born 1989), English rugby league footballer
- Francis Gledhill (1803–1882), New Zealand politician
- Gilbert Gledhill (1889–1946), British Conservative Party politician
- Jonathan Gledhill (1949–2021), Bishop of Lichfield
- Joseph Gledhill (1837–1906), British astronomer
- Keith Gledhill (1911–1999), American tennis player of the 1930s
- Lee Gledhill (born 1980), English footballer
- Mindy Gledhill (born 1981), American singer-songwriter
- Nicholas Gledhill (born 1975), Australian film, stage actor, voice artist, writer and choreographer
- Oliver Gledhill (born 1966), English cellist
- Ruth Gledhill (born 1959), religious correspondent for The Times
- Sammy Gledhill (1913–1994), English footballer
- Samuel Gledhill (1677–1735/6), lieutenant-governor of Placentia, Newfoundland
- Tony Gledhill (born 1938), George Cross recipient
- Vincent Gledhill (born 2008), Professional Squash (sport) Player

== See also ==
- Gledhill (crater), impact crater on Mars
