= Frederick Lister =

Sir Thomas Frederick Lister CBE (23 November 1886 – 13 March 1966) was the first chairman of the British Legion. Along with Field Marshal The 1st Earl Haig, Lister was a leading advocate for the foundation of the British Legion in the aftermath of the First World War.

== Early life ==
Lister was born in Manchester, the son of insurance surveyor Thomas Lister. He was educated at Tranmere higher grade school, and worked as insurance clerk in Liverpool. He was a tall man, some 6 feet 6 inches tall.

He married Isobel Lewis, daughter of a shipping clerk, on 31 July 1911. They had no children.

== First World War ==
When the First World War broke out in 1914, Lister joined the Royal Garrison Artillery, becoming a lance-bombardier. He was wounded and discharged in 1916.

At the time, there was little assistance for disabled veterans, and Lister joined the National Federation of Discharged and Demobilized Sailors and Soldiers (formed in 1917 to campaign against the Military Service (Review of Exceptions) Act 1917, which was intended to re-conscript men formerly discharged on medical grounds). Early veterans organisations were split on largely political lines.

== Post-war career ==
The National Federation had links with the Liberal Party, and its first president was a Liberal MP James Hogge. The National Association of Discharged Sailors and Soldiers was linked with the Labour Party and trades unions; and the Comrades of the Great War was supported by the Conservative Party. The non-partisan Officers Association split the veterans movements further.

Lister was the National Federation's candidate in the December 1918 general election, in the Ashton-under-Lyne constituency. Lister received over 7,300 votes (over 40% of the votes cast), but lost to the Coalition Unionist candidate, Albert Stanley. After the Federation's poor showing at the election, Lister replaced Hogge as its president.

Field Marshal Earl Haig pushed for the competing veterans organisations to unify, supported by Lister. The Federation invited the other organizations to a conference in August 1920, and a series of meetings in 1920 and 1921 resulted in the amalgamation of the various groups into the new British Legion in July 1921, with Lister elected as its first chairman and Haig as its first president.

Lister remained chairman of the British Legion until 1927. He continued as an active member of the British Legion's national executive council until his death in 1966. He was also chairman of the United Services Fund from 1942-48. He was appointed CBE in the 1927 Birthday Honours and knighted in the 1961 New Year Honours.

Lister combined his duties with the British Legion with a full-time job as the accident department manager of an insurance company. He died at his home in Birkenhead, aged 79.
