= John Sharp Higham =

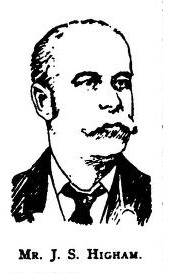

John Sharp Higham (14 June 1857 – 5 January 1932) was a British Liberal Party politician and cotton manufacturer.

== Background ==
A son of Eli Higham, a cotton manufacturer from Accrington. He was educated privately. He married in 1899, Pollie Hartley, daughter of William Pickles Hartley of Southport. They had three sons and one daughter.

== Career ==
He was Chairman of his father-in-law's business, W. P. Hartley Ltd, jam manufacturers. He was also Chairman of his family cotton manufacturing business, Highams Ltd of Accrington, Rochdale and Manchester. He served on Accrington Town Council. He was Mayor of Accrington from 1899 to 1901. He was a member of Lancashire County Council for twelve years. He was a Justice of the Peace in Accrington. He was Liberal MP for the Sowerby Division of Yorkshire from 1904 to 1918. He was elected at the first time of asking in 1904, holding the Liberal seat at a by-election;

Sowerby in Yorkshire, 1885-1918

1904 Sowerby by-election
Party	Candidate	Votes	%	±%
Liberal	John Sharp Higham	6,049	60.9	
Conservative	William Algernon Simpson-Hinchliffe	3,877	39.1	
Majority		2,172	21.8	
Turnout			80.6	
Liberal hold		Swing		

General election 1906: Sowerby
Party	Candidate	Votes	%	±%
Liberal	John Sharp Higham	6,482	61.6	+0.7
Conservative	William Algernon Simpson-Hinchliffe	4,034	38.4	−0.7
Majority		2,448	23.2	
Turnout			84.2	
Liberal hold		Swing	+0.7	

In parliament, he was an advanced radical in favour of Church Disestablishment, Irish Home Rule and the Nationalization of the Railways.

General election January 1910: Sowerby
Party	Candidate	Votes	%	±%
Liberal	John Sharp Higham	6,811	58.8	−2.8
Conservative	William Algernon Simpson-Hinchliffe	4,781	41.2	+2.8
Majority		2,030	17.6	−5.6
Turnout			90.5	+6.3
Liberal hold		Swing	-2.8	

At the General Election of December 1910, he was re-elected unopposed. He was a Member of the Land Values Group which favoured rating reform. He defended his seat at the General Election of 1918, the 'coupon' election; he stood as a Liberal but when offered endorsement from the Coalition Government, rejected it. As a result, he finished third;

General election 1918: Sowerby
Party	Candidate	Votes	%	±%
NADSS	Robert Hewitt Barker	8,287	37.0	n/a
Labour	John William Ogden	7,306	32.7	
Liberal	John Sharp Higham	6,778	30.2	
Majority		981	4.3	
Turnout			65.2	
Independent gain from Liberal		Swing		

After the war he served as President of Southport Liberal Association. He was Treasurer of Lancashire and Cheshire Band of Hope and Temperance Union. He was President of the United Kingdom Commercial Travellers’ Association from 1926 to 1927.

== Sources ==
- Who Was Who
- British parliamentary election results 1885–1918, Craig, F. W. S.

Parliament of the United Kingdom
Preceded by John William Mellor	Member of Parliament for Sowerby; 1904–1918	Succeeded by Robert Hewitt Barker
