= South African Legion of Military Veterans =

Oldest military veterans organisation in South Africa

South African Legion
- Suid-Afrikaanse Legioen
- Formation: 1921
- Type: Ex-service organisation
- Headquarters: Legion House, Rosedale, Lower Nursery Road, Rosebank, 7700 Cape Town
- Affiliations: Royal Commonwealth Ex-Services League
- Website: www.salegion.co.za

The South African Legion is the oldest military veterans organisation in South Africa. It is referred to simply as the SA Legion or even 'The Legion' and is one of the largest independent military veterans charities in South Africa.

== History ==
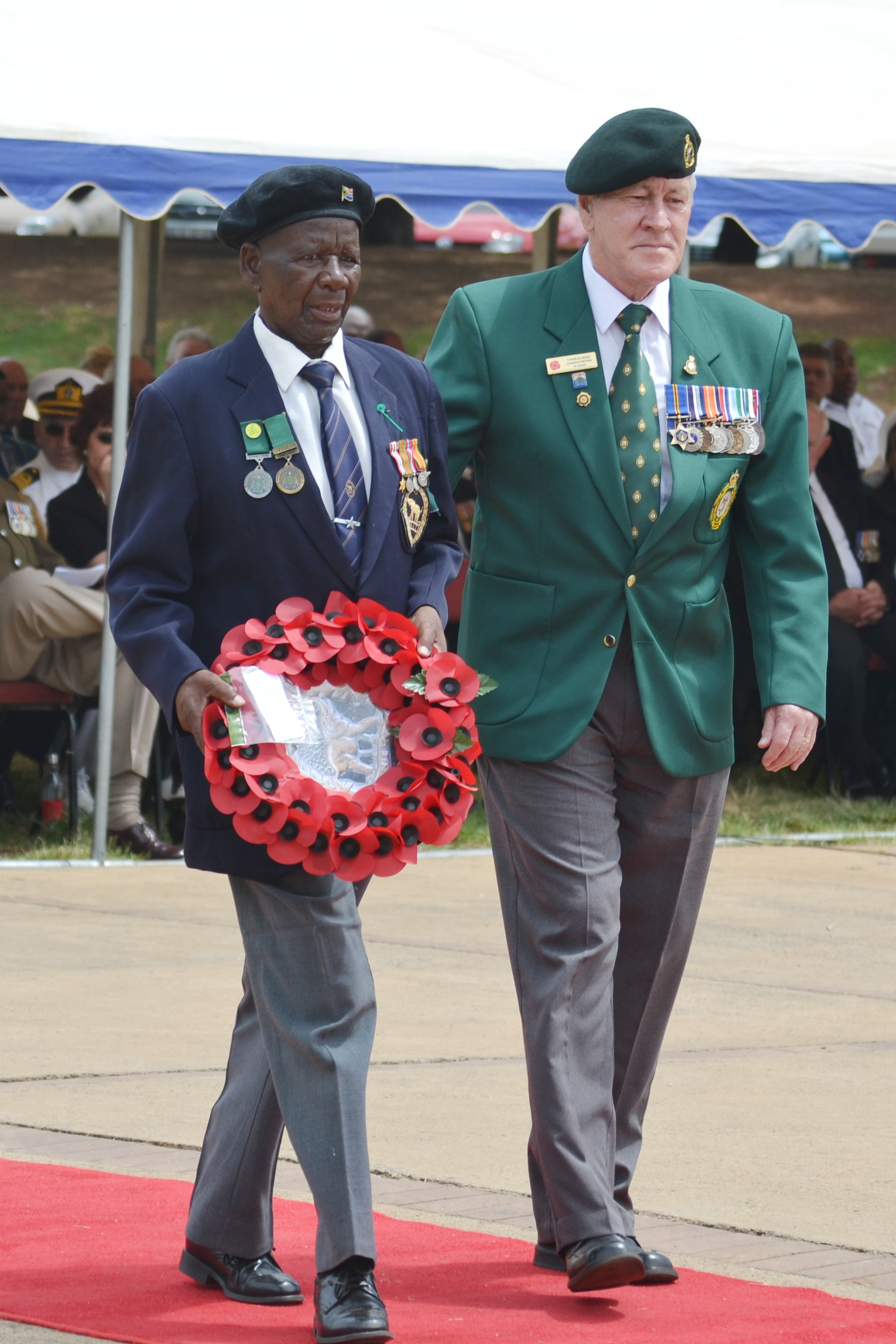
Members of the South African Legion at a Mendi Memorial event.

After suffering the horrors of war in France and Flanders, thousands of men who fought on the British side in World War One underwent incredible hardship once they had been discharged from the armed services and returned to civilian life.

Realising the serious plight in which men found themselves, three prominent soldiers - Field Marshall Earl Haig, General the Rt. Hon. J C Smuts and General Sir H T Lukin - founded the British Empire Service League (BESL) at an inaugural meeting held in the City Hall, Cape Town on 21 February 1921. This is also the date of South African Armed Forces Day, following the proclamation by the former President of the Republic of South Africa and Commander-in-Chief of the South African National Defence Force, President, J.G. Zuma that 21 February every year be observed and commemorated as Armed Forces Day (AFD), where honour is paid to those that lost their lives in the fateful 1917 sinking of the SS Mendi.

At the Empire Conference a week later the SA Legion was formalised (28 February to March 4, 1921) in Cape Town, South Africa as the British Empire Services League (BESL, South Africa) by joining the Returned Soldiers and Sailors Association and the Comrades of the Great War, after which the Comrades Marathon is also named, making SA Legion the oldest military veterans organisation in South Africa and one of the founding organisations of the international Royal Commonwealth Ex-Services League (RCEL). On 8 April 1941, it was decided to call the organisation the South African Legion of the BESL as national feelings were increasing and members wanted to emphasise their South Africanness.

The Legion is an active member organisation of the RCEL and HRH Prince Philip, Duke of Edinburgh, is the High Patron of the Legion. The headquarters of the Legion were originally in Bloemfontein in the centre of the country, but moved to Johannesburg in 1942, where it still is, housed in the South African National Museum of Military History. The name was altered again in 1958, to suit the changing times, to the SA Legion of the British Commonwealth Ex-Services League (BESL). The BESL has since changed its name to the Royal Commonwealth Ex-Services League. The South African Legion's national website states "The Legion is a national, non-sectarian and strictly non-partisan in relation to politics."

The Legion is often mentioned in television news bulletins and websites, not only in connection with its remembrance activities, but also warning military veterans of scams aimed at them. As a non-racial military veterans organisation, the SA Legion has long remembered the tragic loss of the SS Mendi in which more than 600 Black South African soldiers died. The Legion's UK Branch, made up of former South African servicemen and women, has also held a memorial service near the site of the sinking. The commemoration is held in Atteridgeville, Pretoria and Soweto, as well as in Port Elizabeth, which linked with British historians to find missing headstones, and other major centres including Cape Town. South Africa instituted a new Armed Forces Day in 2013, which commemorates the loss of the Mendi.

Remembrance Day is commemorated in Cape Town at the Cenotaph in Heerengracht Street, in Johannesburg at the Cenotaph in Harrison Street and in Pretoria at the Union Buildings. The Legion holds commemorations throughout the country, including Pietermartitzburg, capital of Kwa-Zulu Natal Province.

== See also ==
- American Legion
- Remembrance Day
- Returned & Services League of Australia
- Royal British Legion
- Royal Canadian Legion
- Royal New Zealand Returned and Services Association
