= Lord Houghton =

Lord Houghton or Baron Houghton may refer to:

- Richard Monckton Milnes, 1st Baron Houghton (1809–1885), or his descendants, the Barons Houghton
- Douglas Houghton, Baron Houghton of Sowerby (1898–1996), unrelated to the previous
- Nick Houghton, Baron Houghton of Richmond (born 1954), retired British Army officer
