= National Federation of Discharged and Demobilised Sailors and Soldiers =

British veterans' organisation

- Abbreviation: NFDDSS
- Founded: January 1917
- Dissolved: 15 May 1921
- Succeeded by: Royal British Legion
- Ideology: Veterans' interests
- Political position: Centre-left

The National Federation of Discharged and Demobilised Sailors and Soldiers (NFDDSS) was a British veterans organisation.

The organisation was founded in January 1917 by various London-based veterans groups opposed to the Military Service (Review of Exceptions) Act 1917, which made it possible for people invalided out of the armed forces to be re-conscripted. It adopted the slogans "Every man once before any man twice" and "Justice before charity".

Although the Federation initially invited senior military figures to its meetings, they refused. The leadership was assumed by the left-wing Liberal Party MPs James Hogge and William Pringle, who fought for improved pensions and representation on relevant government committees. Frederick Lister later took over the presidency. The organisation's statutes called for the nationalisation of industry and land. The Federation's politics were thus broadly liberal, although there was a wide diversity of opinion.

In 1919, the Woolwich branch organised a march on Parliament Square, which was baton charged by police. Other branches worked closely with the trade union movement, and some set up soup kitchens. However the organisation's attitude towards the labour movement was ambivalent: it adopted a "trade union manifesto" committing members to oppose strikebreaking, but it opposed strikes during the War, and some members of its leadership were involved in undercover efforts to disrupt the wave of strikes after the War. The Federation voted to reject affiliation to the Labour Party in 1918, and the following year it came out against the railway strike in the autumn of 1919, calling on Prime Minister David Lloyd George to "hold firm against Labour tyranny". The organisation's support for the government against the railwaymen caused tension within its ranks, and many left-wing members left to join its Labour-aligned rival, the National Union of Ex-Service Men, which supported the railway strike.

F.B. Hughes, a member of the NFDDSS, stood on behalf of the group at the 1917 Liverpool Abercromby by-election, against Edward Stanley of the Conservative Party but was unsuccessful, taking only a quarter of the votes cast. This intervention persuaded the Earl of Derby to found Comrades of the Great War as a right-wing alternative veterans group.

== 1918 general election ==
The NFDDSS sponsored a considerable number of candidates at the 1918 general election. Only five of the candidates were officially approved by the National Executive Committee: Brookes, Dooley, Gebbett, Lister and Shakesby. The remainder were put forward by local branches; these included three candidates in Leeds who were jointly sponsored by the rival Comrades of the Great War and National Association of Discharged Sailors and Soldiers organisations in what was termed the "Silver Badge Party". During the campaign, both Dawson and Thompson were repudiated by the organisation.

| Constituency | Candidate | Votes | % | Position |
|---|---|---|---|---|
| Aberavon | T. G. Jones | 324 | 1.5 | 3 |
| Ashton-under-Lyne | Frederick Lister | 7,334 | 41.7 | 2 |
| Battersea South | John Ernest Philip Jenkin | 1,657 | 7.2 | 4 |
| Bermondsey West | Harry Thomas Alfred Becker | 1,294 | 12.3 | 4 |
| Bethnal Green South West | Ernest Thurtle | 1,941 | 23.9 | 2 |
| Birmingham Aston | J. H. Dooley | 1,561 | 9.8 | 3 |
| Brixton | Stephen Kelley | 3,641 | 22.6 | 2 |
| Clapham | Henry Hamilton Beamish | 4,697 | 22.1 | 2 |
| Coventry | A. C. Bannington | 3,806 | 9.8 | 4 |
| Deptford | F. A. Rumsey | 2,106 | 8.1 | 3 |
| Fulham West | William Jones Allen | 995 | 5.3 | 4 |
| Great Yarmouth | Willam H. Dawson | 125 | 0.9 | 4 |
| Grimsby | H. J. F. Crosby | 1,260 | 4.7 | 4 |
| Hitchin | George Humm | 722 | 4.5 | 3 |
| Islington West | Ernest Miles Taylor | 1,105 | 10.0 | 4 |
| Kingston upon Hull South West | Albert E. Shakesby | 695 | 4.3 | 4 |
| Leeds Central | Ernest Terry | 2,634 | 16.2 | 2 |
| Leeds South | James A. Brook | 1,377 | 7.9 | 3 |
| Leeds West | Joseph Henry Chapman | 1,138 | 5.6 | 3 |
| Liverpool Everton | Arthur W. Brooksbank | 5,779 | 47.6 | 2 |
| Manchester Hulme | G. Milner | 729 | 3.6 | 4 |
| Morpeth | G. D. Newton | 2,729 | 12.2 | 4 |
| Newcastle-upon-Tyne East | John Thompson | 1,079 | 7.2 | 3 |
| Norwood | Harold Bignold | 6,665 | 34.2 | 2 |
| Nottingham East | Joseph N. Dennis Brookes | 2,166 | 14.9 | 3 |
| Paddington North | Edward Patrick John Barry | 3,571 | 20.7 | 3 |
| Southwark North | George Gregory Gebbett | 573 | 6.3 | 4 |
| Spelthorne | A. W. Leonard | 1,143 | 7.2 | 3 |
| Tottenham South | Albert Edward Jay | 1,295 | 8.3 | 3 |
| Wallasey | T. D. Owen | 3,407 | 12.9 | 4 |

== Merger ==
In 1920, the Federation invited NADSS, Comrades of the Great War and the Officers' Association to a meeting to discuss a potential merger, and this was achieved in 1921, establishing the Royal British Legion.
