= Arnold Williams (British politician) =

Arnold Williams (30 September 1890 – 1 January 1958) was a British businessman and Liberal politician.

== Family and education ==
Arnold Williams was the son of S W Williams, a Manchester chartered accountant. He was educated privately and at Victoria University of Manchester. In 1915 he married Bessie Clarke Morland. They had one son and a daughter. In the 1920s Williams lived at Thorpe House in the village of Triangle, an area of Calderdale on the main turnpike road between Sowerby Bridge and Ripponden in the Ryburn valley.

== Career ==
In business, Williams was the managing director of National Screen Service Ltd., a firm connected with the film distribution industry.

== Politics ==
Williams contested the West Riding seat of Sowerby in the 1922 general election. This was a four-cornered contest with Conservative, Labour and Lloyd George National Liberal candidates in addition to Williams for the Liberals. He fought the constituency again at the 1923 general election when he was successful, gaining the seat from the sitting Conservative MP. He held the seat until 1924 and did not stand for Parliament again after that.

Parliament of the United Kingdom
Preceded by William Algernon Simpson-Hinchliffe	Member of Parliament for Sowerby; 1923–1924	Succeeded by Geoffrey Reginald Devereux Shaw
