= John Belcher (politician) =

British politician (1905–1964)

John Belcher MP
- Belcher in 1946

Parliamentary Secretary to the Board of Trade
- In office 12 January 1946 – 3 February 1949
- Prime Minister: Clement Attlee

Member of Parliament for Sowerby
- In office 3 August 1945 – 3 February 1949

Personal details
- Born: 2 August 1905 London
- Died: 26 October 1964 (aged 59) Enfield
- Party: Labour

John William Belcher (2 August 1905 – 26 October 1964) was a British Labour Party politician, who served as a trade minister in the post-Second World War Labour government. In February 1949, after an investigation into possible corrupt practices in the Board of Trade, Belcher resigned his ministerial and parliamentary offices when the Lynskey tribunal determined that he had misused his powers as a minister by granting favours in return for small gifts.

Belcher, a former railway clerk, entered parliament in the 1945 general election, and was one of the first of that intake to be promoted to office. As minister, he sought to build up good relations with the business community, and maintained that while he may have been unwise in his choice of friends and associates, his actions did not amount to corruption. On leaving parliament he returned to his clerical job with the railways. He died in 1964.

== Life ==
=== Early career ===
Belcher was born on 2 August 1905 in Kensington, London, the son of John Thomas Belcher, a sometime postal worker, and his wife Lillie Harriett, née Garrard. After attending Brackenbury Road elementary school, at the age of 11 Belcher won a scholarship to Latymer Upper School, where he remained until 1921. He then found clerical employment at the Great Western Railway goods depot in Smithfield, where he became a member of the Railway Clerks' Association (RCA), and by 1929 was serving as branch secretary.

Belcher was active in union affairs throughout the 1930s. He served in various RCA offices, and was the founder of a Workers' Educational Association economics study group for his fellow-clerks at Smithfield. He attended lectures as an external student at London University, and in 1934 received a diploma in economics and social sciences. He had married in 1927; the marriage produced three children. Because of long-standing health problems, when war came in 1939 Belcher was classified as disabled, and was not called up; he spent the war on loan to the Ministry of Information, working as a lecturer and administrator.

=== MP and junior minister ===
In the July 1945 General Election, which brought Labour to power under Clement Attlee, Belcher was elected as the Labour member for Sowerby, capturing the seat from his Conservative opponent with a majority of 6,933. He entered parliament with considerable idealism; his daughter later wrote: "He had seen the deprivation that so many people had suffered in the 1930s and was fired up with an ambition to change things". He made a quiet start to his Commons career; he delayed his maiden speech until 12 December 1945, when he spoke in the debate on the proposed American loan. On 12 January 1946 he was appointed to a government post, as a junior minister at the Board of Trade, one of the first of the 1945 intake to be promoted. As such, his chief responsibility was for the administration of the elaborate system of controls and licences which were a feature of the postwar British economy. Belcher was a conscientious and generally popular minister. He was anxious to secure the trust of the business community by operating these controls fairly, and instituted an "open door" policy through which he sought to meet directly with many of the leading figures in the business world. His health was undermined by his heavy workload, and by mid-1947 he was suffering from severe stress. In May 1948 he was hospitalised for several weeks.

=== Sidney Stanley ===
Belcher's open style brought him into contact with many people who were anxious to influence his decisions. Among those who sought and obtained access was Sidney Stanley, otherwise known as Kohsyzcky, Rechtand or Wulkan. Stanley was an undischarged bankrupt who had been the subject of a deportation order in 1933, which he had avoided. He re-emerged in 1945, and by 1947 was living in style in a luxury Park Lane apartment where he entertained members of the business community on a lavish scale. He operated as a business agent, making large claims to the business world that he could advance their interests through his contacts with senior government officials and ministers, and had sufficient plausibility to be taken seriously by leading businessmen. Stanley had been introduced to Belcher by George Gibson, a respected trade unionist who had recently been appointed as a director of the Bank of England. Belcher readily accepted Stanley's claims that he could act as a bridge between the business community and the government, and the two established a friendship; Belcher would later describe Stanley as "interesting, amusing, generous".

In the course of this friendship, Belcher was often the beneficiary of Stanley's generosity, in the form of much hospitality and various gifts. While many in the Labour Party at that time questioned the ethics of ministers or officials accepting even the smallest of gifts or favours, Belcher's view was more relaxed, an attitude that Stanley was able to exploit. The gifts themselves were relatively small – a suit of clothes, a gold cigarette case, a week's hotel expenses in Margate – and Belcher saw nothing wrong in accepting them. He considered them as no more than gestures of friendship, that would not influence his decision-making in any way. He would later acknowledge that this attitude was "inadequate".

Stanley was not Belcher's only provider of largesse; the distiller Sir Maurice Bloch, who was seeking licences for the importation of casks, presented the minister with dozens of bottles of wine, sherry and whiskey, scarce and highly valued commodities at the time. The licences were duly provided.

=== Lynskey tribunal ===
Rumours of possible corruption in the Board of Trade began to circulate during the summer of 1948. The Metropolitan Police began an investigation. On 27 October, Attlee moved a motion in the House of Commons to set up a tribunal, under the provisions of Section 1 of the Tribunals of Inquiry (Evidence) Act 1921, to enquire into the rumours. Consequent to this motion, the Home Secretary, James Chuter Ede, appointed a High Court judge, Sir George Lynskey, to chair the tribunal, assisted by two King's Counsel. Belcher was asked to take leave of absence from his ministerial duties while the tribunal was in session.

The function of the tribunal, it was said, would be to establish facts rather than to allocate blame or guilt. Hearings began on 15 November 1948, and continued until 21 December. Sixty witnesses testified during this time, but much of the focus of press and public interest was in the relationship revealed between Belcher and Stanley during the latter's testimony, which extended over fifteen hours. There were allegations that, apart from the gifts that Belcher acknowledged he had received, regular sums of cash had been paid to both Belcher and his wife, although no evidence was presented to support this.

Despite the supposedly neutral nature of the tribunal, Belcher was subjected to a particularly harsh cross-examination by the attorney general, Sir Hartley Shawcross who, according to Lewis Baston's account of the proceedings, "had prosecuted Nazi war criminals at Nuremberg [and now] turned his aggressive courtroom tactics against a junior minister in his own government". Notwithstanding this treatment, there was general agreement that Belcher was a good witness who answered questions with candour and, occasionally, good humour. He admitted his friendship with Stanley, and while insisting that he had not been corrupted, now realised that he had been wrong to accept gifts from him. Something of the same courtroom aggression was deployed by Shawcross against Mrs Belcher, who appeared as a witness and whose personal finances were examined in minute detail, an experience which left a lasting trauma. According to her daughter, "she never fully regained her mental health".

The tribunal published its report on 21 January 1949. It rejected most of the allegations made against Belcher, and exonerated all other ministers and public figures except for George Gibson who, it reported, had sought material personal advantage from his dealings with Stanley. The report was particularly scathing in its treatment of Stanley, noting that he was a man who would make any statement, whether true or untrue, if he thought it would advantage him. It concluded that Belcher, by accepting gifts, had been improperly influenced in the exercise of his ministerial responsibilities, in particular in relation to a decision to withdraw a prosecution against the football pools promoter Harry Sherman for exceeding his permitted paper allocation. Belcher expressed himself as "surprised and grieved" by these findings. As to Belcher's dealings with Bloch, according to a Metropolitan Police report it would be possible to mount criminal charges, but Shawcross believed that it would sufficient if Belcher resigned his parliamentary seat. In the event, no criminal proceedings were instituted against Belcher or anyone else connected with the investigation.

=== Resignation ===
On 13 December 1948, while the hearings were still proceeding, Belcher had formally resigned from his ministerial post, while expressing his intention of remaining as MP for Sowerby. After the report's publication, Belcher's constituency party resolved to decide his future at their annual meeting, due on 26 February, when Belcher would be given the chance to make his case to them. However, after further reflection, he decided that his position was untenable and that he should resign his seat forthwith. On 3 February 1949, when the tribunal's report was debated in the House of Commons, he made an emotional personal statement in which he announced his immediate intention to take the Chiltern Hundreds, the legal device for resignation from the Commons. He was critical of many aspects of the tribunal's proceedings, and of the activities of some of the press, and asserted that he had not acted corruptly; despite the findings, "I have not at any time in the course of my official duties been conscious of any deviation from the path of morality or rectitude ... however indiscreet I may have been, however foolish even, I have tried to act according to my lights." He concluded: "I shall face my future with my faith in the cause to which I have devoted the whole of my life strengthened rather than impaired and my determination to do all I can to assist my country as strong as it ever has been."

In moving the adoption of the report by the House, Attlee said that Belcher had "spoken with dignity and courage." According to Herbert Morrison, "None of us who were here this afternoon saw him departing from this Chamber could help feeling deep regret, deep sorrow and deep understanding". Most who spoke were expressed some sympathy towards Belcher, although the Conservative MP Quintin Hogg stated that had Belcher not resigned his seat, he would have supported a motion to expel him from the House. At the end of the debate the House accepted the tribunal's report without a division.

=== Later life, and death ===
On leaving the House of Commons, Belcher wrote a series of newspaper articles which were published in the Sunday Express between 6 February and 6 March 1949, setting out the picture as he saw it. (Note: The five articles were respectively titled: "How I, John Belcher, rose and fell" (6 February 1948); "John Belcher's tribute to my wife, a friend in sunshine and sorrow" (13 February 1949); "What happens when a man becomes a minister of the crown" (20 February 1949); "I walk into the spider's web" (27 February 1949); "After the tribunal, hope for the future" (6 March 1949).) He then disappeared from public view. He returned to the railways and resumed his life as a ticket clerk, but his health was poor, and continued to deteriorate. At one point he faced possible prosecution for non-payment of tax arrears, and was helped by his former boss at the Board of Trade, Harold Wilson. He took early retirement from the railways in 1963, and died at Chase Farm hospital, Enfield, on 26 October 1964, aged 59, just after the General Election that brought Labour back to power under Wilson.

== Appraisal ==
In the Commons debate on 3 February 1949, Attlee had stated: "Where any individual is highly placed, a finding that he has in any way departed from the highest standards involves a very heavy penalty ... public administration in this country and public life in this country stand unrivalled in their high standard of service and incorruptibility". Nevertheless, many of Belcher's friends and colleagues were angered by what they saw as the humiliation of a working-class minister at the hands of the seemingly aristocratic Shawcross, who after Labour's election defeat in 1951 quickly lost interest in the party and parliament, preferring to build up a lucrative business career outside of politics. The conduct of the proceedings continued to rankle; in March 1965, not long after Belcher's death, the Labour MP Leslie Hale spoke of the "grave injustice" that had been done to Belcher, and indeed to other, entirely innocent persons who had nevertheless become tainted by association with this "wretched tribunal". He presented a bill to the House calling for the repeal of the 1921 Act which, he said, had been "born in sin, passed without due consideration, and is continuing to live in iniquity". His bill failed, and the Act remained in force until its repeal in 2005.

In the years that followed the tribunal, Belcher's family, in their distress, were heartened by many letters of support and sympathy they received from all quarters of the political spectrum. In the 1990s, more than 40 years after their father's downfall, Belcher's daughters visited his old constituency and found that older party members still remembered him with affection and were sure that he would have been re-elected, had he been allowed to stand for parliament again.

Baston summarises thus: "Belcher was a bright, idealistic, working-class socialist, who was harshly treated for his naïve attempts to forge a good relationship with business and became a martyr to the puritanical standards of conduct in public life in the austere Attlee era." A more cynical judgment was expressed by one observer: "This is the sort of thing you get when the country is being run by thirty-bob-a-week railway clerks".

== Notes and references ==
=== Sources ===
- "Anglo-American Financial and Economic Discussions". Hansard. 12 December 1945.
- "Background to the Act". www.parliament. House of Commons. 2014.
- Baston, Lewis (2000). Sleaze: The State of Britain. London: Channel 4 Books. ISBN 978-0-752-21783-3.
- Baston, Lewis (6 January 2011). "Belcher, John William". Oxford Dictionary of National Biography (online ed.). Oxford University Press. doi:10.1093/ref:odnb/62279. (Subscription, Wikipedia Library access or UK public library membership required.)
- Gross, John (1964). "The Lynskey Tribunal". In Sissons, Michael; French, Philip (eds.). Age of Austerity 1945–1951. Harmondsworth: Penguin Books. OCLC 504494318.
- "Ministers and Public Servants (Official Conduct)". Hansard. 3 February 1949.
- "Obituary: Mr John Belcher". The Guardian. 27 October 1964. p. 5. ProQuest 184983094. (subscription required)
- Parris, Matthew (1996). Great Parliamentary Scandals: Four Centuries of Calumny, Smear and Innuendo. London: Robson Books. ISBN 978-1-861-05061-8.
- Robinton, Madeline R. (March 1953). "The Lynskey Tribunal: The British Method of Dealing with Political Corruption". Political Science Quarterly. 68 (1): 109–124. doi:10.2307/2145753. JSTOR 2145753.
- "Shocked and Grieved". The Manchester Guardian. 26 January 1949. p. 5. ProQuest 478856905. (subscription required)
- Thomas, Donald (2004). The Enemy Within: Hucksters, Racketeers, Deserters, and Civilians During the Second World War. New York: NYU Press. ISBN 0-8147-8286-8.
- "Tribunals of Inquiry (repeal)". Hansard. 30 March 1965.

Parliament of the United Kingdom
Preceded by Malcolm McCorquodale	Member of Parliament for Sowerby; 1945–1949	Succeeded by Douglas Houghton
Political offices
Preceded by Ellis Smith	Parliamentary Secretary to the Board of Trade; 1946–1949	Succeeded by John Edwards
