= Geoffrey Shaw (MP) =

Lieutenant-Colonel Geoffrey Reginald Devereux Shaw (29 May 1896 – 8 September 1960) was a British barrister, and the Conservative MP for Sowerby.

== Early career ==
Shaw was educated at Cheltenham College and King's College, Cambridge. On the outbreak of the First World War he joined the 5th Battalion, King's Own Yorkshire Light Infantry, serving as an officer with them until February 1916, then transferring to the East Riding Yeomanry until the end of the war.

He returned to Cambridge to study law, and in 1923 was called to the Bar by the Inner Temple. In 1924 he married Elizabeth Fuller, daughter of Admiral Sir Cyril Fuller; they had two sons and three daughters. Elizabeth Shaw was made an MBE in 1945 for her work supporting the St John Ambulance Brigade.

== Parliament ==
He entered politics in 1924, as the Conservative candidate for Sowerby in West Yorkshire. Sowerby was a historically Liberal seat, but the appearance of Labour candidates since 1918 had made it possible for Conservatives to win in a three-way fight. Shaw won the seat on a vote of just under 38%, ahead of the Liberal incumbent, Arnold Williams, on 32% and Arthur Dawson for Labour on 30%.

He did not run for re-election in 1929, saying that his legal career did not allow him to dedicate enough time to his constituency.

== Later career ==
After leaving Parliament, he returned to his successful legal practice, and bought a farming estate in Whilton, Northamptonshire, where he kept a herd of pedigree dairy cattle and owned a haymaking company. He also became active in the Territorial Army, taking command of a company of the 5th King's Own Yorkshire Light Infantry in 1928, and remaining with the battalion after it was converted into an anti-aircraft regiment. He commanded the successor 57th LAA Regiment, RA during the early stages of the Second World War, standing down in 1940.

He was elected to Northamptonshire County Council for Braunston in 1942, and was re-elected unopposed in 1946 as an independent candidate. However, at the end of the year he left the county to move to Scottow, in Norfolk. He remained a councillor, but did not seek re-election in 1949. He died in September 1960, aged 64, at Scottow Hall, leaving an estate of £200,000.

== Sources ==
- Craig, FWS, ed. (1974). British Parliamentary Election Results: 1885-1918 London: Macmillan Press. p. 448. ISBN 9781349022984.

Parliament of the United Kingdom
Preceded by Arnold Williams	Member of Parliament for Sowerby; 1924 – 1929	Succeeded by William John Tout
