= 1904 Sowerby by-election =

UK parliamentary by-election

← 1900	2 July 1904	1906 →
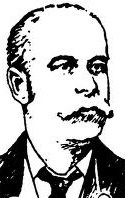

Candidate	Higham	Simpson
Party	Liberal	Conservative
Popular vote	6,049	3,877
Percentage	60.9%	39.1%
MP before election
John William Mellor
Liberal
Subsequent MP
John Higham
Liberal

The 1904 Sowerby by-election was a Parliamentary by-election held on 2 July 1904. The constituency returned one Member of Parliament (MP) to the House of Commons of the United Kingdom, elected by the first past the post voting system.

== Vacancy ==
John William Mellor had been Liberal MP for the seat of Sowerby since the 1892 General Election. Aged 69, he chose to retire from parliament.

== Electoral history ==
The seat had been Liberal since creation in 1885. They easily held the seat at the last election, with a reduced majority:

Mellor

General election 1900: Sowerby
Party	Candidate	Votes	%	±%
Liberal	John William Mellor	5,528	57.6	−1.1
Conservative	John Bailey	4,067	42.4	+1.1
Majority		1,461	15.2	−2.2
Turnout		9,595	80.0	+2.3
Liberal hold		Swing	-1.1	

== Candidates ==
The local Liberal Association selected 47 year-old Accrington businessman, John Sharp Higham as their candidate to defend the seat. He was Mayor of Accrington from 1899–1901. The local Conservative Association selected 24 year-old William Simpson-Hinchliffe as their candidate.

== Result ==
The Liberals held the seat from the Conservatives:

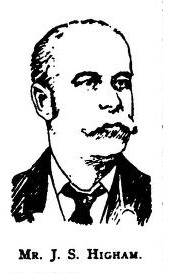

Sowerby by-election, 1904
Party	Candidate	Votes	%	±%
Liberal	John Sharp Higham	6,049	60.9	+3.3
Conservative	William Simpson-Hinchliffe	3,877	39.1	−3.3
Majority		2,172	21.8	+6.6
Turnout		9,926	80.6	+0.6
Liberal hold		Swing	+3.3	

== Aftermath ==
At the following General Election the result was:

General election 1906: Sowerby
Party	Candidate	Votes	%	±%
Liberal	John Sharp Higham	6,482	61.6	+0.7
Conservative	William Simpson-Hinchliffe	4,034	38.4	−0.7
Majority		2,448	23.2	+1.4
Turnout		10,516	84.2	+3.6
Liberal hold		Swing	+0.7	
