= The Royal British Legion Riders Branch =

Charitable motorcycle club

The Royal British Legion Riders
- Abbreviation: RBLR
- Formation: 2004
- Type: Charitable
- Purpose: Charitable Motorcycle Group
- Location: UK
- Members: over 6,000
- Acting Branch Chairman: Paul Woodward
- Website: www.rblr.org.uk

The Royal British Legion Riders Branch (RBLR) was formed in 2004 as a branch of The Royal British Legion, a registered charity that supports past and present members of the Armed Forces. While its membership is dominated by former and current HM Armed Forces personnel, it also welcomes members who support the aims of the Royal British Legion charity, namely of helping and assisting service people, ex-service people and their dependants.

The members are regularly seen at many motorcycle events wearing the distinctive rider's badge. They have become synonymous with the repatriations of fallen service personnel at both Royal Wootton Bassett, where they have met since 11 December 2008 for the repatriation of the bodies of fallen service personnel who were flown into RAF Lyneham. and since 1 September 2011 at Carterton, Oxfordshire after repatriation flights were moved back to RAF Brize Norton. They still attend all Repatriations & continue to do so. Ex-military members of the RBLR often wear medals and head dress with their leathers and motorcycle kit.

RBLR runs events such as Weston Bike Night in Weston-super-Mare, an annual rally, and is now running the annual RBLR 1000 Iron Butt Rally. In 2009, 173 riders completed 1,000 miles in 24 hours and raised £10,000 for the Poppy Appeal.

The RBLR also organises poppy runs (a kind of motorcycle rally) to raise both awareness and money for the Poppy Appeal. Its members also become involved in rides to places with special military resonance such as the Armed Forces Memorial in Staffordshire and European battle sites.

The RBLR has had some celebrity support with Hayley Westenra and Simon Weston both having received the Branches' Poppy Appeal cheque. The Hairy Bikers are members and can often be seen wearing their riders branch wristbands.
