= Vera Houghton =

British women's health campaigner (1914–2013)

The Right Honourable The Lady Houghton of Sowerby
- Vera Houghton
- Born: 18 October 1914; London, England, UK
- Died: 30 November 2013 (aged 99); UK
- Occupation: British women's health campaigner
- Spouse: Douglas Houghton (m. 1939)

Vera Houghton, Baroness Houghton of Sowerby, CBE (née Travis; 18 October 1914 – 30 November 2013) was a British women's health campaigner, chair of the Abortion Law Reform Association and founder of the Birth Control Trust. She also served as a Vice President of the British Eugenics Society from 1964–1966 and again in 1969 when it was reformed as the Galton Institute.

== Early life ==
Goughton was born in London on 18 October 1914 and educated at Haberdashers' Aske's School for Girls, Acton.

== Career ==
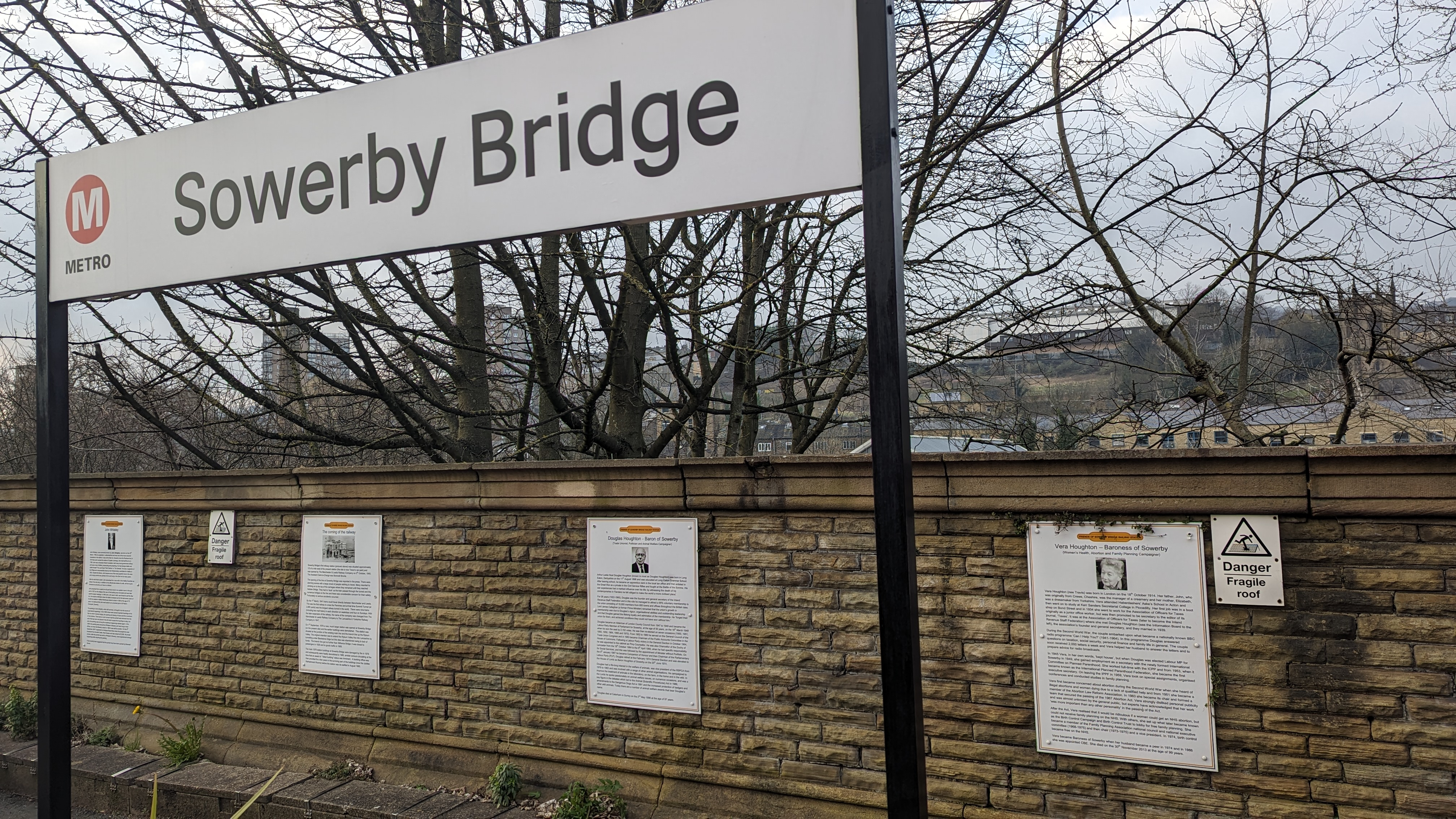
information boards featuring Vera & Douglas Houghton at Sowerby Bridge railway station (railway station in West Yorkshire, England)

Houghton was the chair of the Abortion Law Reform Association from 1963 to 1970, whilst the organisation, lobbied, sponsored and steered the Abortion Act 1967 through parliament. Following this, she continued to campaign for women's reproductive rights by founding the Birth Control Trust, which pushed for universally free contraceptives. She also became active in the Family Planning Association, becoming its chair in 1973, with birth control becoming freely available on the NHS in 1974. She also became executive secretary of the International Planned Parenthood Federation from 1953 to 1959. In 1986, she was appointed a CBE.

== Personal life ==
In 1939, she married Douglas Houghton, the founder and general secretary of the Association of Officers for Taxes, where she had worked since 1934.
