= Arthur Dawson (trade unionist) =

British trade unionist and politician

Arthur Dawson (1890 – c.1966) was a British trade unionist and politician.

Born in Holmfirth, then in the West Riding of Yorkshire, Dawson received an elementary education before becoming a dyer. He joined the National Society of Dyers and Finishers, becoming assistant secretary of its Huddersfield branch in 1910. He was later elected to the union's national executive, and also represented the organisation on the Huddersfield Trades and Labour Council.

Dawson became interested in socialism, joining the British Socialist Party (BSP). Like the majority of the party, Dawson was strongly opposed to World War I, joining the No-Conscription Fellowship. He refused to serve in the military or undertake equivalent service, and so was imprisoned in Wormwood Scrubs, finally being released in the summer of 1919.

In 1920, Dawson was appointed as a full-time organiser for the Dyers and Finishers. Two years later, the union became part of the new National Union of Textile Workers (NUTW), and Dawson was appointed as its Lancashire and Halifax District Secretary, moving to Bury. While the majority of the BSP joined the Communist Party of Great Britain, Dawson instead joined the Labour Party, for which he stood in Sowerby at the 1923 and 1924 United Kingdom general elections.

The NUTW in turn became part of the National Union of Dyers, Bleachers and Textile Workers, and Dawson continued in post. From 1935, he also served on the management committee of the General Federation of Trade Unions. He was co-opted to Bury District Council in 1941, and in 1953/54 was Mayor of Bury. The British Legion and two other ex-servicemen's organisations boycotted his inauguration, because he had been a conscientious objector.

Dawson was teetotal throughout his life. He also had an interest in education, and served on the executive committee of the National Council of Labour Colleges.
