= John Low (East India Company officer) =

Madras Army officer and colonial administrator

Sir John Low GCSI KCB FRSE
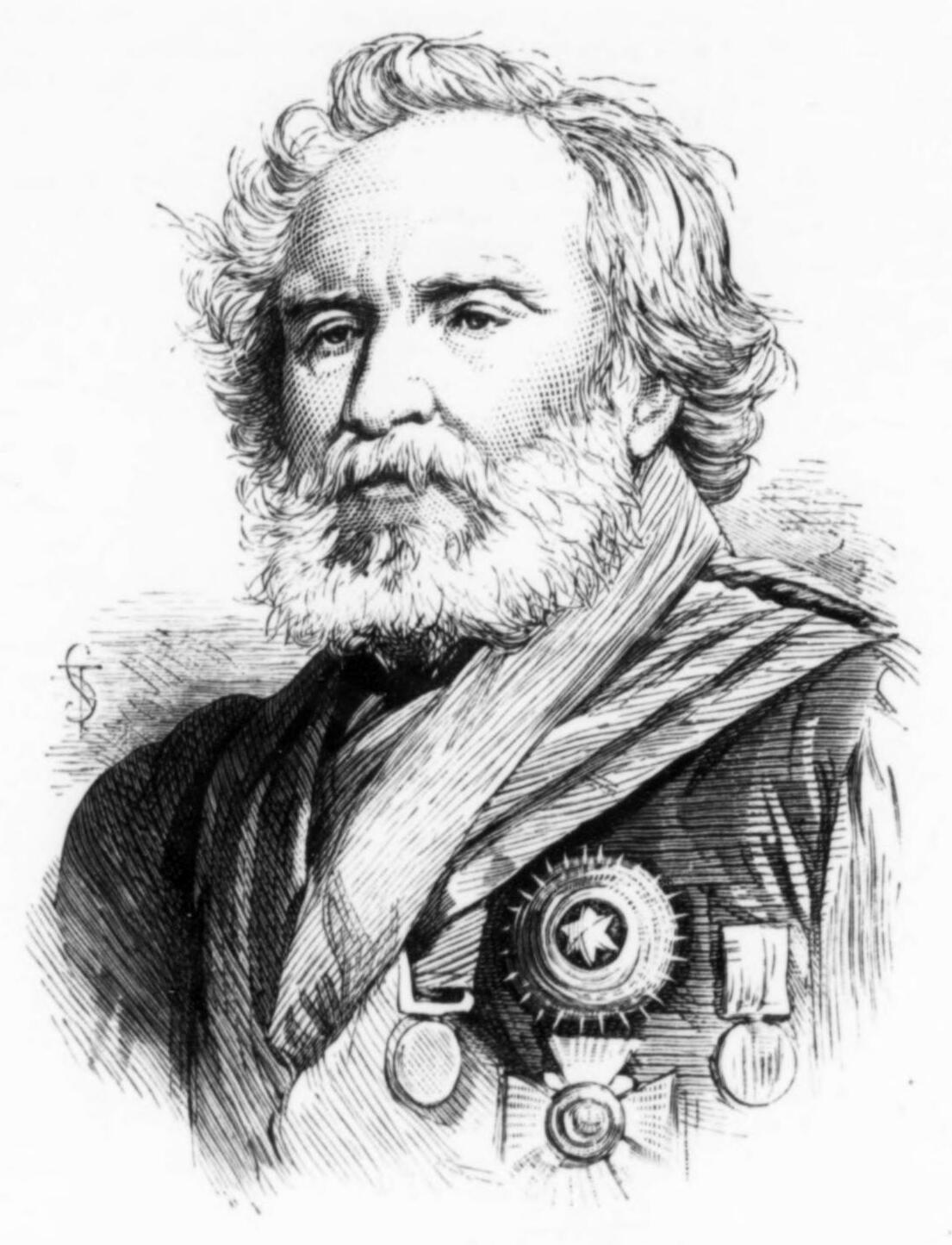
- The Late General Sir John Low (24 January 1880)
- Born: 13 December 1788; Clatto House, Fife
- Died: 10 January 1880 (aged 91); Norwood, Surrey
- Spouse: Augusta Shakespear (m. 1829)
- Children: 9 (see below)
- Military career
- Allegiance: East India Company
- Branch: Madras Army
- Service years: 1805–1857
- Rank: General
- Conflicts: Napoleonic Wars; Invasion of Java (1811); Third Anglo-Maratha War; Battle of Sitabuldi; Battle of Mahidpur

General Sir John Low GCSI KCB FRSE (13 December 1788 – 10 January 1880) was a Madras Army officer and colonial administrator.

== Early life ==
Born at Clatto House, near Cupar in Fife, the eldest son of Captain Robert Low of Clatto, and his wife (the daughter of Dr. Robert Malcolm).

He was educated at St. Andrews University, attending the sessions of 1802–3 (Register), and in 1804 obtained a Madras cadetship on the nomination of John Hudleston.

== Military career ==
On 17 July 1805 Low was commissioned as a lieutenant in the 1st Madras Native Infantry. For the part taken by six of its companies in Vellore mutiny the regiment was disbanded in January 1807; Low became an officer in the reformed 24th Madras Infantry. In 1816 the 24th was renumbered as the 1st Madras Infantry, in recognition of its conduct at the Battle of Sitabuldi. Low became captain in the regiment in 1820, major 17th Madras infantry (late 2nd battalion 24th) in 1828, and lieutenant-colonel 19th Madras infantry in 1834. In 1839 he obtained the colonelcy of his old corps, the 1st Madras Infantry, which he held for the rest of his life. He became a major-general in 1854, lieutenant-general in 1859, general in 1867, and was placed on the retired list in 1874.

Low saw in his early years varied military service. He was attached to the office of the quartermaster-general, 11 May 1810; rejoined his corps in February 1811; was attached to the 59th Foot in the Java expedition of 1811, and was wounded at the storming of Fort Cornelis. He was brigade-major in the ceded districts, and was Persian interpreter and head of the intelligence staff to Colonel Dowse in the South Mahratta country in 1812–13. He was in commissariat charge of Brigadier William Tuyl's force sent against the Guntoor rebels in 1816; and was present at the defeat of the Mahrattas at the Battle of Mahidpur, 21 December 1817, as extra aide-de-camp to Sir John Malcolm. In March following, as first political assistant to Malcolm, he was employed with a force of three thousand men and ten guns in pacifying the Chindwarra district.

== Politics ==
Low induced the Mahratta Peshwa, Baji Rao II, to place himself under British protection. When Baji Rao retired to Bithoor, near Kanpur, Low was appointed Resident there. He filled the post for six years. From that time Low's services were mostly political, though at Lucknow and later at Hyderabad his functions included the control of troops. In 1825 he became political agent at Jeypore. In 1830 he was appointed by Lord William Bentinck to a similar post in Gwalior State, where he opposed the regent Baiza Bai. In 1831 he was sent as Resident to Lucknow.

In 1837 the East India Company took over the government of Oudh State. Low suggested the alternative of deposing the king and placing the heir-apparent on the throne, and the governor-general Lord Auckland left the matter to Low. Meanwhile, the king died suddenly; a pretender and court favourite was placed on the throne and the heir was taken prisoner. Summoning a Bengal regiment to his aid, Low, after a parley, had the gates of the palace blown open and the pretender seized. The heir was then installed by the British resident. Low was made CB on 20 July 1838. He made efforts to suppress a taluqdar, Bhagwant Singh, in 1841. In poor health, he returned to the United Kingdom in 1842.

Low returned to India in 1847, and in 1848 was appointed the governor-general's agent in Rajputana and commissioner at Ajmer-Merwara. There he remained until 1852, when he was sent by Lord Dalhousie to Hyderabad, in succession to James Stuart Fraser, as resident with the Nizam. There he negotiated the treaty by which the Berar Division was assigned to the British government, in return for the maintenance of the Hyderabad subsidiary force.

On 22 September 1853 Low was appointed a member of council. His experience of Indian princes was wide, but had not made him a hawk. In February 1854, he protested the Nagpur annexation; on this, and on other occasions, his views were ignored by Dalhousie. In the questions that ended with the annexation of Awadh, Low advocated interference in 1855. When early in May 1857 news presaging the Indian Rebellion, Low at first advised leniency; but the outbreaks at Meerut and Delhi saw him advocate the recovery of Delhi.

== Last years ==
In In April 1858, Low returned to the United Kingdom. He was made a Knight Commander of the Bath in 1862, and a GCSI in 1873. He died at Norwood, Surrey on 10 January 1880, at age 91, but was buried near his family home in the churchyard at Kemback in Fife.

He had received the East India war medal with clasps for Java and Mahidpur, the British war medal for Java, and the Indian Mutiny Medal.

== Family ==
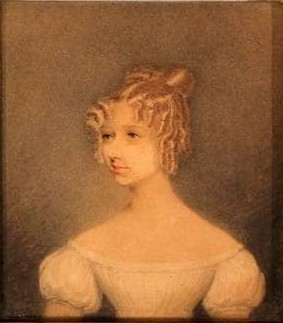
Augusta Shakespear (1826)

In 1829, Low married Augusta Shakespear, second daughter of John Talbot Shakespear, Bengal civil service, and sister of Sir Richmond Shakespear, one of Low's assistants at Lucknow. They had four sons and five daughters:

- Susan Elizabeth Low (1830–1831)
- Emily Low (1832–1832)
- Charlotte Herbert Low (1833–1853), who married Sir Theophilus John Metcalfe, 5th Baronet, of the Bengal Civil Service
- William Malcolm Low (1835–1923), Conservative MP for Grantham, who married Ida Matilda Alice Feilding, daughter of William Feilding, 7th Earl of Denbigh, and is the great-great-grandfather of British politician David Cameron
- General Sir Robert Cunliffe Low (1838–1911), British Indian Army officer
- John Alwes Low R.N. (1840–1932), who married Jane Hooper
- Irvine Low (1841–1881), who married Agnes Harriet Liston Foulis, daughter of Sir William Liston-Foulis, 8th Baronet
- Augusta Georgina Low (1844–1921)
- Selina Morison Low (1845–1927)

The history of John Low and his family is told in Ferdinand Mount's book The Tears of the Rajas: Mutiny, Money and Marriage in India 1805–1905.

== Honours ==
- Knight Grand Commander of the Order of the Star of India (GCSI)
- Knight Commander of The Most Honourable Order of the Bath (KCB)

== Sources ==
Attribution:

This article incorporates text from a publication now in the public domain: Lee, Sidney, ed. (1893). "Low, John". Dictionary of National Biography. Vol. 34. London: Smith, Elder & Co.
