= 1949 Sowerby by-election =

UK parliamentary by-election

The 1949 Sowerby by-election for the constituency of Sowerby in the United Kingdom House of Commons was held on 16 March 1949, caused by the resignation of the incumbent Labour MP John Belcher. The result was a hold for the Labour Party, with their candidate Douglas Houghton.

== Result ==
Sowerby by-election 1949
Party	Candidate	Votes	%	±%
Labour	Douglas Houghton	18,606	53.0	+2.2
Conservative	P Bryan	16,454	47.0	+16.1
Majority		2,152	6.0	−13.9
Turnout		35,060		
Labour hold		Swing		

== Previous result ==
General election 1945: Sowerby
Party	Candidate	Votes	%	±%
Labour	John Belcher	17,710	50.8	+4.6
Conservative	Malcolm McCorquodale	10,777	30.9	−23.0
Liberal	D E Moore	6,373	18.3	New
Majority		6,933	19.9	N/A
Turnout		34,860	82.0	+6.1
Labour gain from Conservative		Swing		
