= Royal Commonwealth Ex-Services League =

- Abbreviation: RCEL
- Formation: 1921
- Founders: Earl Haig, Jan Smuts
- Type: Ex-service organisation
- Registration no.: 231322
- Legal status: Charity
- Headquarters: Borough High Street; London, SE1; United Kingdom
- Region served: Worldwide
- Official language: English
- Patron: Lord Richards of Herstmonceux, GCB, CBE, DSO, DL
- Grand President: Lord Richards of Herstmonceux
- Deputy Grand President: Major General Mitch Mitchell, CB, MBE
- Secretary General: Christopher Warren
- Affiliations: Memorable Order of Tin Hats, Returned & Services League of Australia, Royal New Zealand Returned and Services Association, The Royal British Legion, The Royal Canadian Legion, South African Legion
- Website: www.commonwealthveterans.org.uk
- Formerly called: British Empire Service League

The Royal Commonwealth Ex-Services League (RCEL) represents the interests of Commonwealth citizens who have served in either the British or Commonwealth forces. It was founded in 1921 (as the British Empire Service League) by Field Marshals Earl Haig and Jan Smuts to link together the various ex-service organisations throughout the Commonwealth.

== History ==
The archives of the League are retained at its headquarters in London (UK). The papers include minutes of the council from 1952 onwards and those of the executive committee; reports of the Triennial Conference since 1921; annual audited accounts; and subject and correspondence files referring to individual ex-servicemen's organisations in various countries. A full set of the magazine Our Empire is also available. Special permission is required for access to the papers and further enquiries should be addressed to the Secretary-General.

== See also ==
- British Empire
- Commonwealth of Nations
- Commonwealth War Graves Commission
- Remembrance Day

== Bibliography ==
- Cook, Chris, ed. (2006). The Routledge Guide to British Political Archives: Sources Since 1945. Abingdon, UK: Routledge. ISBN 978-0-415-32740-4.
