= Malcolm Low =

William Malcolm Low (1835 – 14 June 1923) was a British Conservative party politician. He was the member of parliament (MP) for the Grantham division of Lincolnshire from 1886 to 1892.

He was born at Lucknow, son of General Sir John Low KCB and Augusta Ludlow Shakespear, and was educated at Haileybury and Imperial Service College. His mother was the daughter of John Talbot Shakespear by his wife Amelia Thackeray, and thus a first cousin of novelist William Makepeace Thackeray. On 30 July 1872 he married Lady Ida Feilding, daughter of William Feilding, 7th Earl of Denbigh. Through their daughter Hilda, who married Sir William Mount, 1st Baronet, he is a great-great-grandfather of former British Prime Minister David Cameron. His brother was General Sir Robert Cunliffe Low GCB who was involved in the Chitral Expedition.

Parliament of the United Kingdom
| Preceded by John William Mellor | Member of Parliament for Grantham; 1886 – 1892 | Succeeded by Henry Lopes |
