= Sidney Stanley =

British-Israeli fraudster (c.1899–1969)

- Born: Solomon Wulkan; 1899 or 1905; Poland
- Died: 1969 (aged 63–64 or 69–70); Tel Aviv, Israel
- Other name: Shlomo Ben-Chaim
- Citizenship: Polish; Israeli (from 1949)
- Espionage activity
- Agency: Irgun
- Codename: Solomon Koszyski
- Stanley Rechtand

Sidney Stanley (né Solomon Wulkan, 1899/1905–1969) alias Solomon Koszyski, alias Stanley Rechtand, and alias Shlomo Ben-Chaim, was a Polish émigré to the UK who became an unethical businessman before claiming to be a contact man who could influence politicians and civil servants in exchange for cash bribes. In 1948, his claims of being a political fixer led to a great scandal and an investigation of public corruption by the Lynskey tribunal.

Moreover, Stanley spied against the UK on behalf of the Irgun, a Zionist paramilitary organisation. The British government ordered Stanley to be deported, but he had lost his Polish nationality and so Stanley was a stateless person, and afterwards was placed under heavy legal restrictions and police surveillance. In 1949, he evaded police and fled to France and thence to Israel, where the government granted Stanley citizenship through the Law of Return, and lived the remainder of his life in relative obscurity.

== Early life ==
Solomon Wulkan (Sidney Stanley) was born the eldest son of twelve children, in Poland. In 1913, Stanley emigrated to Britain with his father and were joined by the rest of the family and lived in Aldgate. He later said he was born in Oświęcim. He was granted a Polish passport in 1927. He gave an ambiguous account of his early career, claiming to have been employed from the age of 14 in trade, in the garment business, and government contracts. Stanley assumed and used his mother's surname Koszyski as one of his identities.

After the First World War (1914–1918), Stanley married his first wife, Kate Zeitlin, and they lived with his mother-in-law in Stoke Newington.

Stanley was bankrupt in 1927, under the name Wulkan, and was again bankrupt in 1936, under the name Blotz. In 1933, the British government ordered his deportation for being a criminal, specifically for a conspiracy to defraud, though he proved untraceable; however, by 1946, Stanley had established himself in a luxurious seven-room flat in Park Lane.

== Meeting with Gibson ==
According to Stanley, in 1946, he was returning by train from a business trip to Manchester when the guard enquired whether he would make up a foursome for a game of solo whist with some other men. He consequently met George Gibson, a director of the Bank of England. Gibson's account is that his party had asked Stanley for small change for their game and that Stanley had recognised Gibson through a common acquaintance, Cyril Ross.

Gibson met Stanley several more times on the Manchester train before, in April 1947, running into him in the company of Marcus Wulkan, an American who had been involved in economic assistance to Britain during World War II and who was slightly known to Gibson. Stanley represented Wulkan as being his brother. Gibson invited the two to dinner, where they now met junior government minister John Belcher, and after that Gibson visited Stanley's Park Lane home frequently. At a subsequent dinner party attended by Morgan Phillips and four other Labour MPs, Stanley became involved in raising finance for the anti-communist "Freedom and Democracy" organisation, though he appears to have done little more than donate a cheque for £50 which was dishonoured.

In October 1946, Stanley approached fur-dealer Cyril Ross, the common acquaintance from the Manchester train, with a business proposition. Ross said that he would be interested in a multiple store such as J. Jones of Manchester. Stanley agreed to pursue the matter and also to get permission for flotation as a public company from the Capital Issues Committee. Stanley, somewhat prematurely, offered a directorship in J. Jones to Gibson who, owing to his position, turned it down. Ross had originally intended that Stanley would be remunerated by equity in the new company but he ultimately lost trust, largely because of the extortionate expenses that Stanley regularly claimed, and agreed only to a fee for the work.

In February 1948, Gibson introduced Financial Secretary to the Treasury Glenvil Hall to Stanley, believing that Marcus Wulkan might be in a position to arrange an American loan of £250 million to the UK government. At a dinner for Gibson on 23 March, Stanley ensured that he sat next to Foreign Secretary Ernest Bevin.

== Entertaining Mr Belcher ==
Belcher was keen to network with industrialists and was flattered by Stanley's apparent solicitude. The two rapidly became friends and Stanley offered Belcher use of a house that he had rented at Margate for the duration of the 1947 Labour Party conference. Belcher took the opportunity to invite his wife, children and mother for a two-week vacation, and it soon became apparent to Stanley that the party was too large for his rented house. Stanley booked the party into a hotel in Cliftonville and, though Belcher at this point became nervous, Stanley insisted and prevailed. In the end, Belcher indulged himself thoroughly and the friendship between the pair became increasingly intimate.

Stanley pressed more and more gifts of food and wine, a gold cigarette-case and ultimately a suit of a quality beyond the means, and clothing coupons, of a junior minister in post-war Britain. Stanley was full of rather vague industrial and commercial propositions that never came to any resolution. Stanley also paid for suits for Gibson and Minister of Works Charles Key.

Several people warned of Stanley's unreliability including Hugh Dalton, Leonard Joseph Matchan and Morgan Phillips.

== Spying ==
In November 1947 an MI5 report recorded that a man named "Stanley" had been passing information to Irgun from cabinet minister Manny Shinwell. Shinwell certainly knew Stanley whom he had approached for help in finding employment for his son Ernie, and Stanley had obtained information on the disbandment of the Transjordan Frontier Force from some government source.

== Football pools ==
Harry Sherman was a director of Shermans Pools Ltd of Cardiff, a football pools promoter. The post-war paper-shortage had led the government to make an allocation of paper to the Football Pool Promoters' Association and to leave the association to share it among its members. Sherman believed his share to be unjust and took every opportunity to canvass anyone who could influence his case or find him an alternative source. However, Sherman's record of complaints of his misconduct in a closely regulated industry led the Board of Trade to start a prosecution against the company in January 1948. The magistrate who heard the case died before giving judgment and Sherman and his legal team galvanised into action to prevent a new hearing. Belcher was the minister responsible and was inundated with protests. Stanley contacted Sherman sometime in May, claiming to have already discussed the paper problems with Sherman's brother.

In May, Stanley introduced Sherman to Gibson and to Glenvil Hall. Sherman sought a public flotation of Shermans Ltd but needed the permission of the Capital Issues Committee though neither politician was optimistic. Stanley also canvassed Key over some premises that he was attempting to sell to Sherman.

On 20 April, Stanley invited Belcher to stop by his Park Lane apartment. When he arrived he found Sherman. Belcher left angrily and later rebuked Stanley. Belcher decided to drop the prosecution against Sherman but the allocation of paper was now under his direct control and Sherman became still more insistent in seeking to increase his ration. Stanley continued to intercede on Sherman's behalf and Belcher agreed to meet with Sherman and the civil servant in charge of paper rationing on 24 June. At this meeting, Sherman revealed that he had been routinely exceeding his allocation. The government team were appalled and stopped the meeting indicating that they considered the matter a serious one and that an investigation would be inevitable.

Before the investigation could get under way, Sherman alleged that he had paid Stanley so that Stanley, in turn, could pay GBP2,500 each to Belcher and Sir Frank Soskice, the Solicitor General. Sherman also claimed that he had loaned GBP12,000 to Stanley, secured by a GBP27,000 cheque made out to Lass & Co. The cheque turned out to be a forgery, made out on a stolen blank cheque. Appalled, and becoming increasingly aware that rumours were beginning to circulate, Belcher tried to warn Gibson but could not contact him. Senior civil servants had now become aware of the allegations and the police were involved. Belcher agreed that the Lord Chancellor William Jowitt, 1st Earl Jowitt should be alerted and asked to investigate. On 24 September, Belcher received a request from Jowitt that he provide a statement about his dealings with Stanley. On 4 October, the first rumours, though no names, appeared in the press.

== Stanley's arrest ==
Jacob Harris was a supplier of amusement machines whose solicitor also acted for Stanley. The solicitor had originally met Stanley through serving a bankruptcy notice on him and had ended up as his attorney. The original debtor never got paid. Stanley boasted of his surplus import licences and the solicitor advised Harris whom he knew wanted to import pinball machines. In July 1948, Harris approached fellow supplier Francis Price with a proposal that they meet with Stanley. Stanley claimed that he could bribe Belcher and Financial Secretary to the Treasury Glenvil Hall to obtain licences. After canvassing some commercial and political confidantes, Price contacted the police. Press speculation intensified.

On 27 August Stanley asked Gibson to write letters of introduction for his wife, who was about to leave for the US, to some of Gibson's trade union colleagues there. Gibson complied and Stanley used the letters to attempt to obtain from HM Treasury foreign currency above the usual allowance. Stanley's approach alerted officials to the possibility that he was about to flee the country. 27 August was also the day when Gibson sent a cheque for GBP500 to Stanley as deposit on a share offer in Gray's Carpets Ltd. Gibson heard nothing more from Stanley.

Stanley was arrested on 18 October and held in Brixton Prison. Spartan though his surroundings were, he was able to order meals from a restaurant and pay another detainee for domestic duties. He was bailed on 21 October and returned to his Park Lane flat where his movements were restricted under the Aliens Order 1946 (SR&O 1946/395).

== The tribunal ==
A tribunal was convened. Stanley, dapper in appearance, proved a self-important, self-aggrandising witness who amused the tribunal with his idiosyncratic, colourful, yet ambiguous and contradictory, responses to the questioning. The tribunal found that Belcher and Gibson had acted improperly and they were fortunate to escape prosecution, gladly accepting the proffered alternative of resignation. Attorney-General Sir Hartley Shawcross expressed the opinion that Stanley could not be prosecuted as the notoriety he gained from the tribunal would inhibit a fair trial. The spying allegations were not raised in the tribunal.

== After the tribunal ==
On 23 December, Stanley applied for cancellation of his deportation order but was refused. However, while Gibson and Belcher were resigning in disgrace, Stanley and his wife were enjoying their notoriety and celebrity, attending the Chelsea Arts Ball at New Year.

In a debate in the House of Commons on 3 February 1949, Prime Minister Clement Attlee expressed the government view that Stanley should be deported as the deportation would be "conducive to the public good". Attlee was probably principally motivated by the spying allegations and Stanley's Zionist connections.

Despite the deportation order, the British government found that it could not deport Stanley, because no country was willing to receive him. He had lost citizenship in his home country of Poland, which was unwilling to take him in. Due to the changes in Poland's borders since World War II, the Polish government required all Polish citizens to re-register home and abroad. Stanley had not done so, and in addition, the Polish Foreign Ministry announced that he would not be allowed to return. As a result, Stanley was rendered a stateless person, and could not be deported unless his country of origin or some other country was willing to receive him.

In February 1949, Stanley applied for Israeli nationality. On 13 February, his application was rejected on the grounds that he was an undesirable. The Israeli newspaper Haaretz attacked Stanley as a Jew who "suddenly discovered his love for Zion" when in difficulties and there was speculation that Stanley had done his case no good when he criticised the conduct of the 1948 Arab-Israeli War during his tribunal testimony. Stanley continued to entertain and enjoy his celebrity, despite continued calls for his deportation, while he was again pursued by the bankruptcy courts. Stanley threatened to sue Israel for denying him entry, and empowered his lawyers in Israel to take action in court to get him an immigration visa. His lawyers in Israel argued that under the new state's proposed constitution, no Jew could be barred from immigrating to Israel.

Stanley was still required daily to report to police but reported for the last time on 1 April and an arrest warrant was issued. Stanley, it appears, drove to Ramsgate, where a personal friend took him by sea to a port near Boulogne in France, possibly Dunkirk. He was taken from there by car to Abbeville. On 13 April, Israel announced that it would accept Stanley's application for an immigration visa and admit him to the country on the eve of Passover as "an act of grace and mercy". After about a month in France, Stanley travelled to Marseille, where he boarded the Israeli ship Atzmaut. On 9 May, he arrived in Haifa aboard the Atzmaut together with about 2,000 other immigrants to Israel. He then held a press conference announcing that his name was now Shlomo Ben-Chaim. He made various claims regarding his disappearance, including that he had been kidnapped and held in France for a month, that he had escaped from Britain disguised as an admiral, and then as a military officer who became a passenger on a British destroyer. His lawyer, Max Seligman, said he was a "psychological case". Sometime later in 1949, Stanley returned to France with some thoughts of re-establishing himself in business, but moved back to Israel in 1950, where he spent the remainder of his life in obscurity, save for the wild allegations and stories that he continued to press on the newspapers. Stanley died in Tel Aviv in 1969.

== Bibliography ==
- Andrew, C. (2009). The Defence of the Realm: The Authorized History of MI5. London: Allen Lane. ISBN 978-0-141-02330-4.
- Hansard, adjournment debate 18 November 1947 (football pools reorganization)
- Kynaston, D. (2007). Austerity Britain: 1945–51. London: Bloomsbury. pp. 299–300. ISBN 978-0-7475-7985-4.
- Wade Baron, S. (1966). The Contact Man: The Story of Sidney Stanley and the Lynskey Tribunal. Secker & Warburg.
- Stanley, S., "How I made my escape", The People, 15 May 1949
