= Lynskey tribunal =

1948–1949 British government inquiry

The Lynskey tribunal was a British government inquiry, set up in October 1948 to investigate rumours of possible corruption in the Board of Trade. Under the chairmanship of a High Court judge, Sir George Lynskey, it sat in November and December 1948, hearing testimony from some sixty witnesses who included a number of government ministers and other high-ranking public servants. Much of the inquiry was centred on the relationship between the junior trade minister, John Belcher, and a self-styled business agent, Sidney Stanley, who claimed to have considerable influence in government circles which he was prepared to exercise on behalf of the business community. In its findings, published in January 1949, the tribunal found that Belcher, who admitted that he had accepted hospitality and small gifts from Stanley and from the distiller Sir Maurice Bloch, had been improperly influenced in his ministerial decision-making, although it dismissed allegations that he had received large sums of cash. A director of the Bank of England, George Gibson, was likewise found to have used his position to obtain personal advantage. All other ministers and officials were exonerated. Belcher resigned from his ministerial post and from parliament; Gibson was required to resign from his Bank directorship and from other public offices. Although the possibility of criminal proceedings was briefly considered, no further action was taken against any of the participants in the inquiry.

== Background ==
The years following the Second World War saw the United Kingdom suffering from widespread material shortages and from rationing more severe than it had been during the war. During 1948, allegations began to surface that ministers and civil servants were taking bribes to help businessmen circumvent the rules. Home Secretary James Chuter Ede established a tribunal under High Court judge Sir George Lynskey, assisted by Godfrey Vick KC and Gerald Upjohn KC, and with a broad ranging remit to enquire into the allegations. The enquiry was thought to be sufficiently important to recall Attorney-General Sir Hartley Shawcross from his mission to the United Nations, where he was completing the administration of the Nuremberg Trials, so that he could lead for the government's interest. Arthur Goodhart argued that using Shawcross's elite forensic skills enhanced the efficiency, effectiveness and reputation of the Tribunal.

== Allegations ==
The principal allegations centred on the activities of Sidney Stanley, a businessman from Poland. Stanley was involved with important figures in London society, and rumours circulated that he accepted bribes to shortcut red tape and arrange preferential treatment. Among those said to have accepted his services were the Welsh football pool promoter Harry Sherman and an importer of pinball machines who sought further import licences.

Junior minister John Belcher and director of the Bank of England, and former president of the TUC, George Gibson were accused of corruption and they had received gifts from Stanley, including suits for which Stanley had provided the clothing coupons. Chancellor of the Duchy of Lancaster Hugh Dalton was also accused, as was Minister of Works Charles Key, and businessman Robert Liversidge. The informal nature of the proceedings, convened without any defined indictment, led to a frenzy of speculation and allegation in the press.

Though Stanley had been named as a Zionist spy by an MI5 report, which accused him of passing on information gained from Manny Shinwell a Jewish cabinet minister and known supporter of Zionism, to the Zionist paramilitary Irgun which at the time was carrying out a campaign of bombings and assassinations against British officials and Palestinian civilians in an attempt to overthrow the British Mandatory Government of Palestine. Shinwell was acquainted with Stanley, having requested his help and perceived influence in finding Shinwell's son Ernie suitable employment in the private sector. The Irgun thus obtained in advance such information as the disbandment of the Transjordan Frontier Force.

== Findings and aftermath ==
The tribunal sat in public for 26 days hearing witnesses at Church House, Westminster, with Stanley in attendance and considerable public attention. The tribunal rose just before Christmas 1948 and reported on 28 January 1949. It focused solely on Stanley's fraudulent financial activities and influence-peddling. No allegations about his spying were raised at the tribunal.

The enquiry concluded that Belcher and Gibson had been influenced in their public conduct and the police were of the view that they could be charged, though Shawcross argued that prosecution would not be in the public interest so long as they resigned. Accordingly, Belcher and Gibson resigned. The Civil Service, Dalton, Key, Liversidge and others were exonerated. Though no steps were taken to prosecute Stanley, there was a widespread sentiment that he ought to be deported. He left the United Kingdom, somewhat clandestinely, for Israel in April 1949.

The Tribunal led to the establishment of a Committee on Intermediaries to examine "how far persons are making a business of acting as ... intermediaries between Government Departments and the public, and to report whether the activities of such persons are liable to give rise to abuses..."

== Bibliography ==
- [Anon.] (1949a) Report of the tribunal appointed to inquire into allegations reflecting on the official conduct of ministers of the crown and other public servants, Cmd. 7617
- — (1949b) Proceedings of the tribunal appointed to inquire into allegations reflecting on the official conduct of ministers of the crown and other public servants
- Andrew, C. (2009). The Defence of the Realm: The Authorized History of MI5. London: Allen Lane. ISBN 978-0-141-02330-4.
- Baston, L. (2000). Sleaze: The State of Britain. Channel 4 Books. ISBN 978-0-7522-1783-3.
- — (2004) "Belcher, John William (1905–1964)", Oxford Dictionary of National Biography, Oxford University Press, accessed 20 July 2007 (subscription required)
- Bolsover, P. (1949). Corruption – Comments on the Lynskey Tribunal. London: Communist Party of Great Britain.
- Bryson, G. (2004) "Lynskey, Sir George Justin (1888–1957)", Oxford Dictionary of National Biography, Oxford University Press accessed 21 July 2007 (subscription required)
- Day, P. (2000) "Attlee’s Government was Riddled with Sleaze", The Independent, 5 January, p.8
- Doig, A. (1996). "From Lynskey to Nolan: The corruption of British politics and public service?". Journal of Law and Society. 23 (1): 36–56. doi:10.2307/1410466. JSTOR 1410466.
- Gross, J. (1963) "The Lynskey Tribunal", in Sissons, M. & French, P. (1963). Age of Austerity. Oxford: Oxford University Press. pp. 255–75. ISBN 978-0-19-281949-9.
- Kynaston, D. (2007). Austerity Britain: 1945-51. London: Bloomsbury. pp. 299–300. ISBN 978-0-7475-7985-4.
- March, W. (1949). The Story of the Lynskey Tribunal. London: Alvin Redman.
- Morgan, K. O. (1985). Labour in Power, 1945–1951. Oxford: Oxford University Press. ISBN 978-0-19-285150-5.
- Newell, J. L. (2007) "Ethical Conduct and Perceptions of Public Probity in Britain: the Story so Far", paper presented to the workshop on "Corruption and Democracy in Europe: Public Opinion and Social Representations", University of Salford, 29–31 March.
- Pimlott, B., ed. (1986). The Political Diary of Hugh Dalton, 1918–1940, 1945–1960. London: Jonathan Cape. ISBN 978-0-224-01912-5.
- Rhodes, H. T. F. (1949). The Lynskey Tribunal. London: Thames Bank.
- Robinton, M. R. (1953). "The Lynskey tribunal: the British method of dealing with political corruption". Political Science Quarterly. 68 (1): 109–124. doi:10.2307/2145753. JSTOR 2145753.
- Rogers, L. (1951). "The problem and its solution". The University of Chicago Law Review. 18 (3): 464–477. CiteSeerX 10.1.1.673.4002. doi:10.2307/1597771. JSTOR 1597771.
- Roodhouse, M. (2002). "The 1948 Belcher affair and Lynskey tribunal". Twentieth Century British History. 13 (4): 384–411. doi:10.1093/tcbh/13.4.384.
- — (2005) "Gibson, George (1885–1953)", Oxford Dictionary of National Biography, Oxford University Press, accessed 21 July 2007 (subscription required)
- Shawcross, H. (1995). Life Sentence. London: Constable. ISBN 978-0-09-474980-1.
- Wade Baron, S. (1966). The Contact Man: The Story of Sidney Stanley and the Lynskey Tribunal. Secker & Warburg.
