= Gledhill (crater) =

Crater on Mars

Gledhill Crater
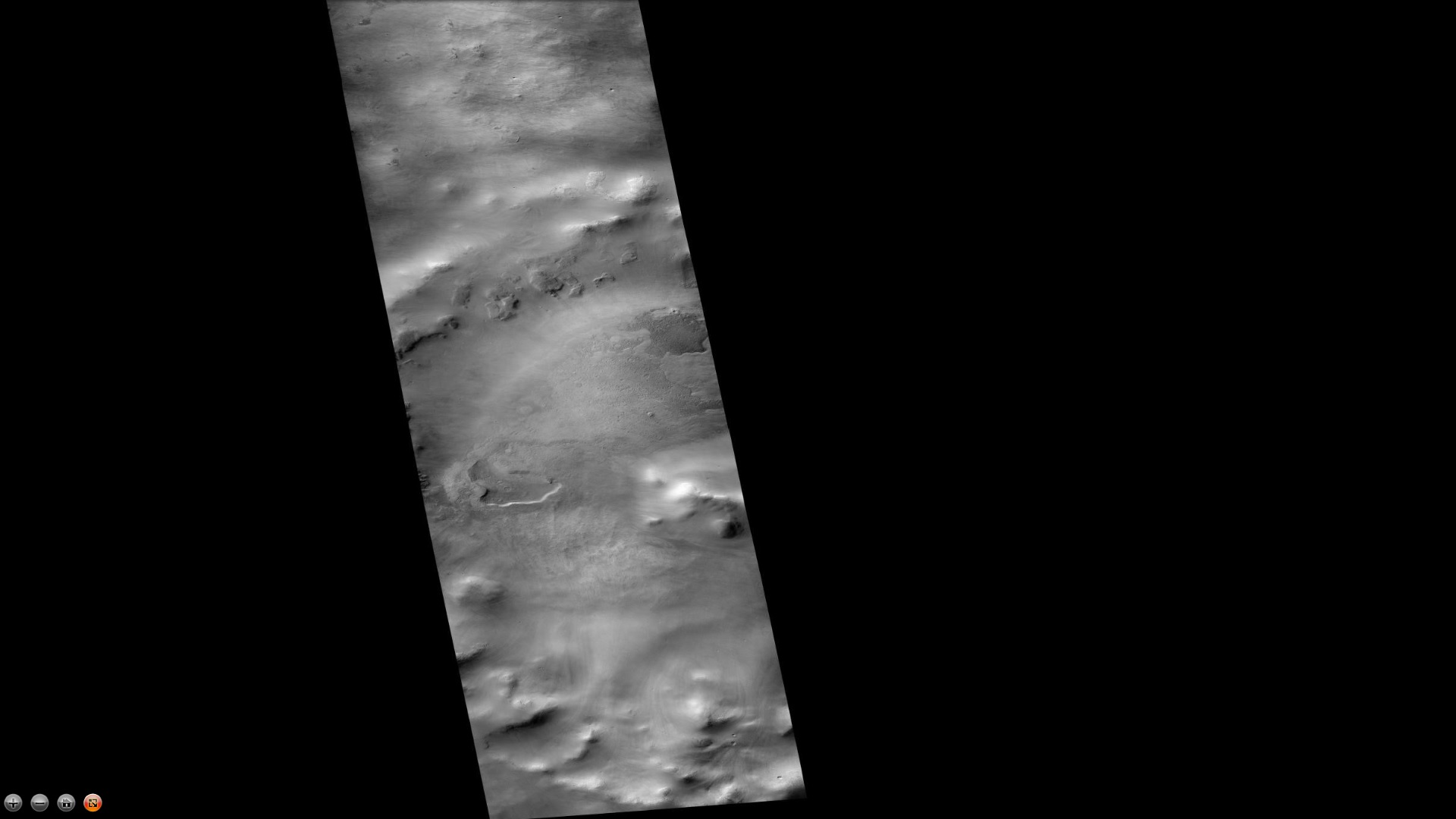
- Gledhill Crater, as seen by CTX camera (on Mars Reconnaissance Orbiter).
- Planet: Mars
- Region: Hellas quadrangle
- Coordinates: 53.2°S 87.1°E
- Quadrangle: Hellas
- Diameter: 78.5 km
- Eponym: Joseph Gledhill

Gledhill is an impact crater in the Hellas quadrangle of Mars, located at 53.2°S latitude and 87.1°E longitude. It is 78.5 km in diameter. It was named after British astronomer Joseph Gledhill, and the name was approved in 1973 by the International Astronomical Union (IAU) Working Group for Planetary System Nomenclature (WGPSN).

Impact craters generally have a rim with ejecta around them, in contrast volcanic craters usually do not have a rim or ejecta deposits. As craters get larger (greater than 10 km in diameter) they usually have a central peak. The peak is caused by a rebound of the crater floor following the impact. Gledhill Crater shows a central peak in a picture on this page.

== See also ==
- List of craters on Mars
