= William John Tout =

William John Tout (1870–1946) was Labour MP for Oldham, a two-member constituency.

Tout began working in a cotton mill in Burnley at the age of ten, initially as a half-timer. He opposed the half-time system, and took part in the Burnley Weavers' Association's campaigns against it. This activity gradually brought him to prominence, and in 1911, Tout was elected as the general secretary of the Todmorden Weavers' Association. Four years later, he was elected as vice-president of the Amalgamated Weavers' Association, to which the Todmorden union was affiliated. He also served on the executive of the United Textile Factory Workers' Association.

Tout stood as a UTFWA-sponsored candidate in Oldham at the 1922 general election, winning the seat, and held it in 1923. He lost his seat in 1924, possibly as a result of Labour standing two candidates. He stood unsuccessfully again at the 1925 Oldham by-election. He then won Sowerby from the Unionists in 1929, but lost it in 1931.

Out of Parliament, Tout retained his trade union posts until 1945, and remained secretary of the Todmorden Weavers until his death the following year.

Parliament of the United Kingdom
Preceded by Sir William Barton; Edmund Bartley-Denniss	Member of Parliament for Oldham; 1922 – 1924; With: Edward Grigg	Succeeded by Edward Grigg; Duff Cooper
Preceded by Geoffrey Shaw	Member of Parliament for Sowerby; 1929 – 1931	Succeeded by Malcolm McCorquodale
Trade union offices
Preceded by James Wilkinson	General Secretary of the Todmorden Weavers' Association; 1911–1946	Succeeded by Frank Morris
