= John William Mellor =

British politician (1835–1911)

The Right Honourable John William Mellor DL KC
- John William Mellor c1895

Member of Parliament for Grantham
- In office 1880–1886 Serving with Charles Savile Roundell (1880–1885)
- Preceded by: Sir Hugh Cholmeley, Bt; Henry Cust
- Succeeded by: Malcolm Low

Member of Parliament for Sowerby
- In office 1892–1904
- Preceded by: Edward Crossley
- Succeeded by: John Sharp Higham

Personal details
- Born: 26 July 1835 London, England
- Died: 13 October 1911 (aged 76)
- Party: Liberal Party
- Spouse: Caroline Paget (m. 1860)
- Parent: Rt Hon. Sir John Mellor (father)
- Relatives: Charles Paget (father-in-law)
- Education: Trinity Hall, Cambridge

John William Mellor 1906

John William Mellor PC DL KC (26 July 1835 – 13 October 1911) was an English lawyer and Liberal Party politician.

Born in London, the eldest of the eight sons of Rt Hon. Sir John Mellor, of Otterhead, Devonshire, a Judge of the Queen's Bench Division of the High Court, Mellor was educated at Trinity Hall, Cambridge.

In 1860 he married Caroline Paget, daughter of Charles Paget, MP.

He became a barrister of the Inner Temple in 1860, a Queen's Counsel in 1875 and a Bencher in 1877. He was Recorder of Grantham from 1871 to 1874 and Judge Advocate General from February to August 1886. In 1878 Mellor was involved in the Whistler v Ruskin libel trial.

He was Liberal Member of Parliament for Grantham from 1880 to 1886 and for Sowerby, Yorkshire from 1892 until 1904, when he retired from Parliament. In Parliament, he was Chairman of Ways and Means & Deputy Speaker to Arthur Wellesley Peel from 1893 to 1895, and was a member of the Royal Commissions on Tweed and Solway Fisheries in 1896, on the Water Supply to London in 1897, and of the Committees of Royal Commission Patriotic Fund in 1898. A passionate Protestant he attended and spoke at the United Protestant Demonstration in London on 29 January 1900 which resolved ) "to uphold and maintain the Protestantism of the nation and to demand the suppression of the Mass and the Confessional in the Established Church."

He was appointed a Privy Counsellor in 1886.

Parliament of the United Kingdom
Preceded by Sir Hugh Cholmeley, Bt; Henry Cust	Member of Parliament for Grantham; 1880–1886; With: Charles Savile Roundell 1880–1885	Succeeded by Malcolm Low
Preceded by Edward Crossley	Member of Parliament for Sowerby; 1892–1904	Succeeded by John Sharp Higham
