= Robert Hewitt Barker =

Robert Hewitt Barker (1887 – 14 February 1961) was a British textile mill owner. He was the independent Member of Parliament for Sowerby, 1918–1922, with the support of the National Association of Discharged Sailors and Soldiers.

He became joint owner of the firm of Luke Barker and Sons, cotton spinners in Todmorden. He was in the Lancashire Fusiliers in World War I, rising to the rank of Major. He stood for Parliament in 1918, but did not stand again in 1922.

Parliament of the United Kingdom
Preceded by John Sharp Higham	Member of Parliament for Sowerby; 1918–1922	Succeeded by William Simpson-Hinchliffe
