= Edward Crossley =

Edward Crossley (1841 – 21 January 1905) was an English businessman, Liberal Party politician and astronomer.

== Biography ==
Edward Crossley was the eldest son of Joseph Crossley J.P., of Broomfield, Halifax, Yorkshire, of the Crossley carpets dynasty. He inherited his family's carpet manufacturing business (John Crossley & Sons) from his father when he was 27. He married Jane Eleanor Baines, third daughter of the Leeds newspaper proprietor and MP Sir Edward Baines.

He was the Member of Parliament (MP) for Sowerby from 1885 to 1892. He was also mayor of Halifax from 1874–1876 and 1884–1885.

He became a Fellow of the Royal Astronomical Society in 1867. He built the Bermerside astronomical observatory, operational from 1867 to 1894, and purchased a 36-inch (910 mm) telescope from Andrew Ainslie Common in 1885, and employed Joseph Gledhill as an observer. With Gledhill and James Wilson (later Canon of Worcester), he wrote A Handbook of Double Stars in 1879, which became a standard reference work.

By 1895 Crossley had deemed the rainy English weather and the industrial air pollution at his observatory site unsuitable for astronomy, so he donated his 36-inch (910 mm) telescope to the Lick Observatory in California. Though extensively modified, it was used for research until 2010 and is known as the Crossley reflector. This telescope was used by Charles Dillon Perrine to discover two moons of Jupiter. The 36 in. Crossley reflector was used extensively before the 120 in. Shane Reflecting Telescope (C. Donald Shane Telescope) was built in 1959.

Parliament of the United Kingdom
New constituency	Member of Parliament for Sowerby; 1885–1892	Succeeded by John William Mellor
