= Tony Gledhill =

Recipient of the George Cross

Tony Gledhill GC
- Born: 10 March 1938 (age 88); Doncaster, South Yorkshire
- Police career
- Service: Metropolitan Police Force
- Allegiance: United Kingdom
- Service years: 1956–1987
- Rank: Detective Sergeant
- Awards: George Cross

Anthony John Gledhill, GC (born 10 March 1938), known as Tony Gledhill, is a retired Metropolitan Police officer who was awarded the George Cross for the heroism he displayed on 25 August 1966 in chasing and subduing armed criminals.

== George Cross ==
Gledhill was serving as a constable in the Metropolitan Police Force at the time. His partner, Constable Terry McFall, was awarded the George Medal for the same action. They were on patrol when they were ordered to chase a car driving the wrong way down a one-way street. Fifteen shots were fired at their police car during the ensuing chase. The criminals' car crashed into a lorry and they attacked the police officers, who were trying to arrest them. Both police officers were injured in the confrontation but managed to subdue the men until assistance arrived.
