= Douglas Houghton, Baron Houghton of Sowerby =

British politician (1898–1996)

The Right Honourable The Lord Houghton of Sowerby CH PC
- Portrait by Walter Bird, 1963

Chancellor of the Duchy of Lancaster
- In office 18 October 1964 – 6 April 1966
- Prime Minister: Harold Wilson
- Preceded by: The Lord Blakenham
- Succeeded by: George Thomson

Member of Parliament for Sowerby
- In office 17 March 1949 – 8 February 1974
- Preceded by: John Belcher
- Succeeded by: Max Madden

Personal details
- Born: 11 August 1898
- Died: 2 May 1996 (aged 97)
- Spouse: Vera Travis (m. 1939)

Arthur Leslie Noel Douglas Houghton, Baron Houghton of Sowerby, CH, PC (11 August 1898 – 2 May 1996) was an English Labour politician. He was the last British Cabinet minister born in the 19th century. After he retired in 1967, every Cabinet minister has been born since 1900. He was also the last veteran of World War I to serve in the Cabinet and both Houses of Parliament.

== Early life ==
Houghton was born in Long Eaton, Derbyshire and later secured a post in the civil service. He then fought in the First World War, surviving the Battle of Passchendaele.

== Political career ==
Houghton was a great believer in equality of opportunity and campaigned for certain numbers of lower (clerical) grade civil servants to have the chance of taking an examination that could lead to previously unheard-of promotion. In 1922, he founded the Inland Revenue Staff Federation and was its leader from 1922 to 1960. He served on the General Council of the Trades Union Congress from 1952 to 1960, and as Chairman of the Staff Side Civil Service National Whitley Council from 1955 to 1957.

He was a panel member of a BBC radio programme Can I help You? between 1941 and 1964. His connections with the London Labour movement and the Labour Party gave him the profile to become an Alderman of the London County Council - the forerunner of the Greater London Council - from 1947–1949.

After John Belcher quit the House of Commons over accusations of minor dishonesty, Houghton was persuaded to seek nomination for the subsequent by-election. He secured this and on 16 March 1949 was elected to Parliament for the Yorkshire constituency of Sowerby with a majority of 2,152.

He was re-elected in the subsequent general elections of 1950, 1951, 1955, 1959, 1964, 1966 and 1970. His head for figures and tenacity made him a good candidate for Chairman of the Public Accounts Committee in the House of Commons, succeeding Harold Wilson in this post after Wilson was elected Leader of the Labour Party in 1963. When, after 13 years in government, the Conservative Party was defeated in October 1964, Houghton became a cabinet minister in Wilson's first government and was appointed a Privy Counsellor.

The post of Chancellor of the Duchy of Lancaster after 1964 gave Houghton a position in the cabinet and special responsibility for Social Services but not an actual department over which he could preside. This made it hard to be particularly effective as a minister, and in a 1966 reshuffle, Wilson made him Minister without Portfolio.

Houghton became a Member of the Order of the Companions of Honour on 5 January 1967 and was dropped from government in 1967 and became Chairman of the Parliamentary Labour Party (PLP) which is a post designed to help shape and reflect the backbench Labour MPs' views but keep them in dialogue with the Labour leadership. His predecessor, Emanuel Shinwell, could be rather fiery and unpredictable. By contrast, Houghton had a tenacity and command of detail that made him a highly suitable person for the task, given there was perceived to be quite a lot of factionalism in the party at the time. He retired from the House of Commons at the February 1974 General Election and was elevated to the House of Lords as Baron Houghton of Sowerby, of Sowerby in the County of West Yorkshire a few months later on 20 June.

Shortly before he died in 1996, he was the last member of the House of Lords to have fought in the First World War, and at 97, was then its oldest serving member. A warm tribute was paid to him by Tam Dalyell, himself an MP, in one of Britain's national newspapers.

The Labour History Archive and Study Centre at the People's History Museum in Manchester holds the collection of Douglas Houghton, whose papers include those of the Parliamentary Labour Party, animal charities and pressure groups, as well as broadcasts, speeches and correspondence.

== Animal welfare ==
Houghton was passionate about the subject of animal welfare and spoke in the House of Lords on the subject a number of times. Houghton and Lord Platt proposed what became known as the Houghton/Platt Memorandum on Animal Experimentation to the Home Secretary on 4 August 1976. He also inaugurated the "Putting Animals in Politics" campaign in 1976. These led to the formation of Committee for the Reform of Animal Experimentation (CRAE) which aimed to reform the Cruelty to Animals Act 1876. The outcome was the Animals (Scientific Procedures) Act 1986. Houghton was a patron of FRAME (1987–1996). Andrew Linzey has written that Houghton "devoted the last twenty-five years of his life to animal advocacy.

== Personal life ==
In 1939, he married Vera Houghton who also worked at Association of Officers for Taxes, before becoming a campaigner for abortion law reform and free birth control.

== Arms ==
Coat of arms of Douglas Houghton, Baron Houghton of Sowerby

Crest
On a cap of maintenance Gules turned up Ermine a representation of the ruins of the Church of Saint Thomas of Canterbury, Heptonstall Proper.
Escutcheon
Or issuant from a barrulet wavy Azure a stone bridge of three arches throughout Proper in chief a rose Gules barbed slipped with two sprigs leaved Proper charged with another rose Argent seeded Proper in base a Barn Owl statant also Proper.
Supporters
On either side a badger Proper gorged with a collar Or charged with a barrulet wavy Azure.
Motto
Bear No Base Mind

Political offices
Preceded by New position	General Secretary of the Inland Revenue Staff Federation; 1936–1960	Succeeded by Cyril Plant
Preceded by John Hare	Chancellor of the Duchy of Lancaster; 1964–1966	Succeeded by George Thomson
Parliament of the United Kingdom
Preceded by John Belcher	Member of Parliament for Sowerby; 1949–1974	Succeeded by Max Madden
Party political offices
Preceded by Manny Shinwell	Chair of the Parliamentary Labour Party; 1967–1974	Succeeded by Ian Mikardo
