= Royal British Legion =

Charity for members of the British Armed Forces

- Abbreviation: RBL
- Formation: 15 May 1921; 105 years ago
- Founder: Tom Lister, Douglas Haig
- Merger of: Comrades of the Great War; National Association of Discharged Sailors and Soldiers; National Federation of Discharged and Demobilized Sailors and Soldiers
- Type: Ex-service organisation
- Registration no.: 219279
- Legal status: Charity
- Headquarters: Haig House, London, England
- Region served: Worldwide
- Patron: King Charles III
- National President: Paul Bennett
- National Chairperson: Lynda Atkins
- Director General: Mark Atkinson
- Publication: The Royal British Legion
- Subsidiaries: Poppy Factory; RBL Riders Branch; Poppy Ireland
- Affiliations: Royal Commonwealth Ex-Services League
- Website: www.britishlegion.org.uk

The Royal British Legion (RBL), formerly the British Legion, is a British charity providing financial, social and emotional support to members and veterans of the British Armed Forces, their families and dependants, as well as representing them publicly.

== Membership ==
Service in the armed forces is no longer a requirement of Legion membership. The Legion has an official membership magazine, Legion, which is free to all Legion members as part of their annual subscription.

== History ==
The British Legion was founded on 15 May 1921 as a voice for the ex-service community as a bringing together of four organisations: the Comrades of the Great War, the National Association of Discharged Sailors and Soldiers and the National Federation of Discharged and Demobilised Sailors and Soldiers, and incorporated the fundraising department of the Officers' Association.

Field Marshal The 1st Earl Haig (1861–1928), British commander at the Battle of the Somme and Passchendaele, was one of the founders of the Legion. Lord Haig served as the president of the British Legion until his death.

According to Mark Garnett and Richard Weight, it was established and run by Britain's upper class, but gained a broad membership. They argue:

It was a product of the First World War and the combination of altruism towards, and fear of, the working class. ... The social dislocation caused by veterans' mental and physical trauma, coupled with the industrial unrest and disillusionment with war as an instrument of foreign policy, made the need to bring officers and men together in one body seem more pressing.

A royal charter was granted in 1925, accompanied by invaluable patronage from royal circles. During the Second World War, it was active in civil defence, providing officers to the Home Guard. Its membership grew rapidly from veterans of the Second World War, reaching three million in 1950. It declined to a half million elderly survivors by 2003.

In 1997, the Royal British Legion rejected calls to include gay and lesbian veterans in its ceremonies, and called the advent of a Queer Remembrance Ceremony "offensive". In the 2000s, it reversed this policy.

== Functions ==
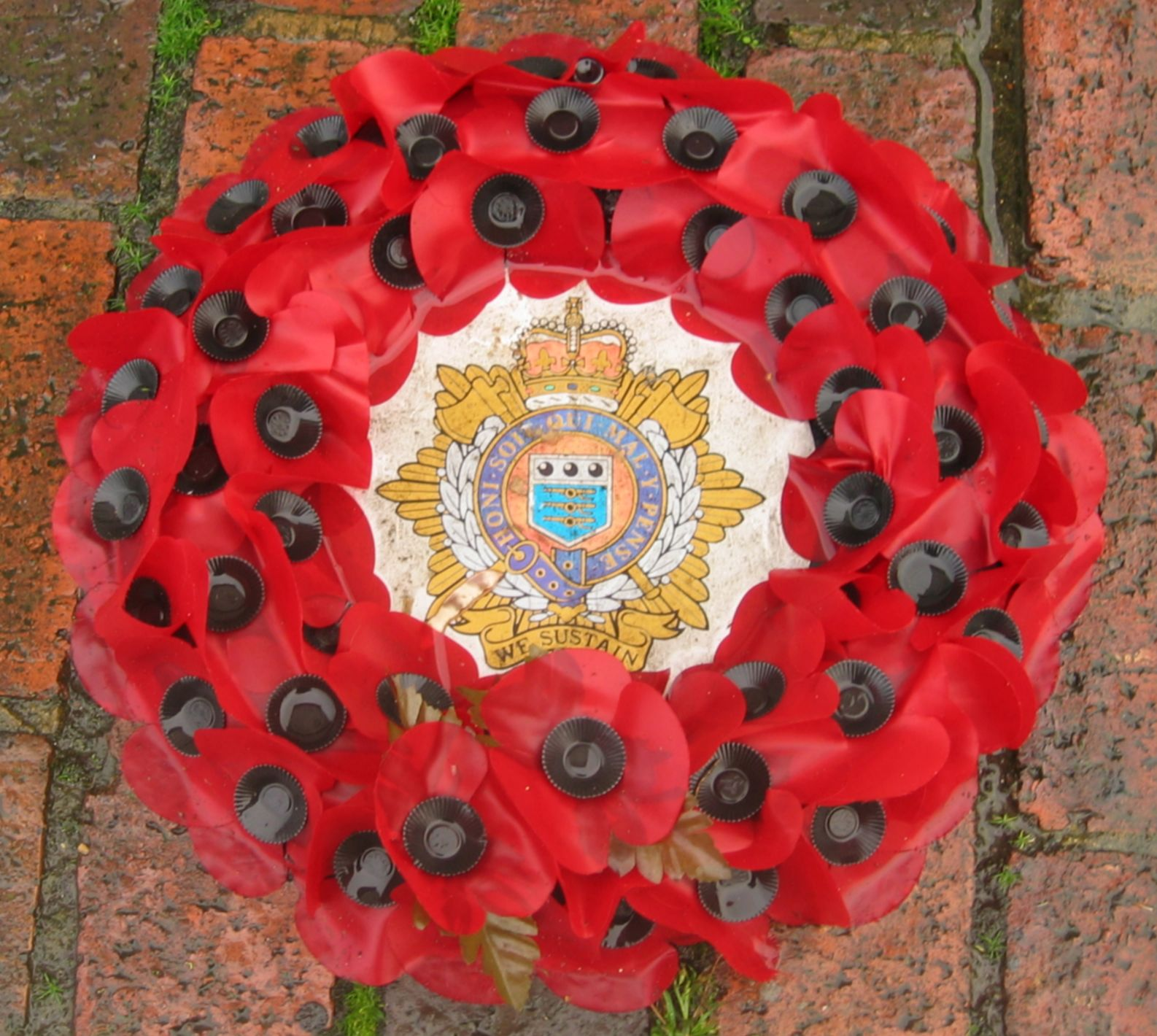
A wreath of artificial poppies featuring the Royal Logistic Corps emblem used on Remembrance Day

Best known for the yearly Poppy Appeal and Remembrance services, the Legion is a campaigning organisation that promotes the welfare and interests of current and former members of the British Armed Forces.

Legion campaigns include calls for more research into: Gulf War syndrome and compensation for its victims; upgrading of War Pensions; the extension of endowment mortgage compensation for British military personnel serving overseas; and better support for British military personnel resettling into civilian life.

== Poppy Appeal ==
The Legion holds a fund-raising drive each year in the weeks before Remembrance Sunday in November, during which artificial Remembrance poppy red poppies, meant to be worn on clothing, are offered to the public in return for a donation to the Legion. The Poppy is the trademark of The Royal British Legion, RBL states "The red poppy is our registered mark and its only lawful use is to raise funds for the Poppy Appeal". The paper poppies are manufactured at the Poppy Factory in Richmond. Other products bearing the Poppy, the Trademark of The Royal British Legion are sold throughout the year as part of the ongoing fundraising.

== Festival of Remembrance ==
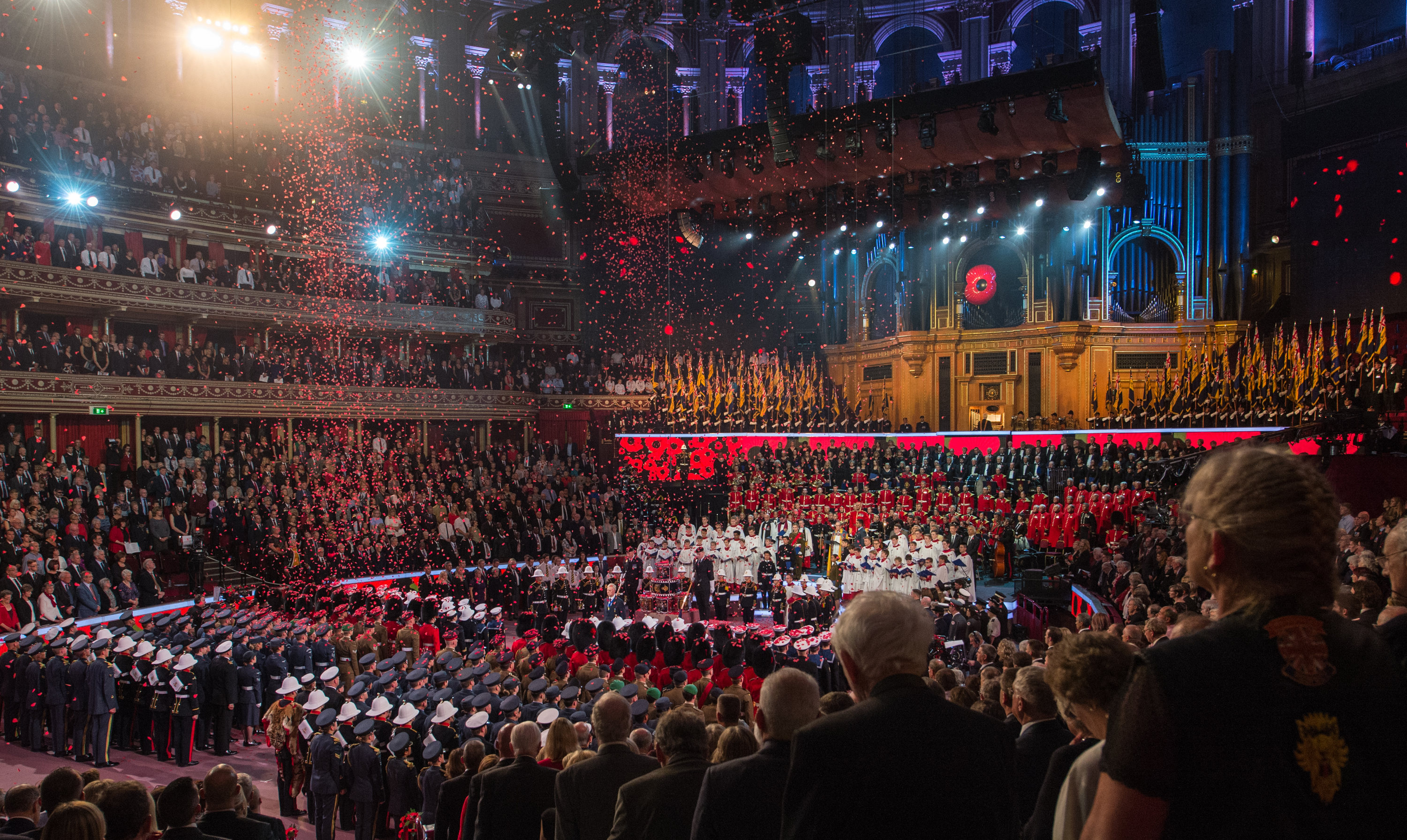
The 2015 Festival of Remembrance

The Legion organises 'The Festival of Remembrance' in Royal Albert Hall, London on the Saturday before Remembrance Sunday. It is currently televised. Originally featuring composer John Foulds's World Requiem it now includes military displays by current members of the armed forces, choral works, and prayers. It culminates with Servicemen and Women, with representatives from youth uniformed organizations and uniformed public security services of the City of London, parading down the aisles and onto the floor of the hall. There is a release of poppy petals from the roof of the hall.

On the day there are two performances. The matinee is open to any member of the public. The evening event is open only to members of the Legion and their families, and is attended by senior members of the Royal Family; starting and ending with the British National Anthem, God Save the King, and includes the three cheers led by the army's London District Garrison Sergeant Major at the finale. In 2007, the second half of the evening event was aired live on BBC Radio 2. BBC One showed the event an hour later.

Most parts of the Festival are of a formal, thought-provoking, and solemn nature. In recent years, the items have included more contemporary performers to attract a younger audience. They have included family members of serving military personnel (e.g. The Poppy Girls and the Military Wives choir); singers Gregory Porter, Joss Stone, Jim Radford and James Blunt, the latter two of whom being both military veterans; and the animatronic horse used in the war film War Horse.

Musical accompaniment for the event is provided by a military band from the Household Division together with the Duchess of Edinburgh's String Orchestra, joined by musicians of the Royal Air Force (via the RAF Music Services through the RAF Salon Orchestra) and representatives of the Royal Marines Band Service.

== Honour the Covenant campaign ==
Honour the Covenant is a campaign launched by The Royal British Legion in September 2007, which calls on the UK Government to honour the Military Covenant. The campaign aims to seek public support for the issues identified by the Legion and to encourage their Members of Parliament to act to ensure that Government policy is changed.

The campaign accuses the Government of failing to meet its commitments under the Covenant. The Legion highlighted the case of a 23-year-old paratrooper, injured in battle, who was awarded £152,150 despite injuries requiring care for the rest of his life. It also criticised the practice of treating soldiers in wards alongside civilian patients. In his conference speech that October, Conservative Party leader David Cameron referred to the Covenant and said "Mr. Brown, I believe your government has broken it."

=== Medical care ===
Responding to the Royal British Legion's campaign, the former Secretary of State for Health Alan Johnson announced in November 2007 that all armed forces veterans would get priority treatment on the National Health Service for service-related conditions, and those injured would be treated immediately in hospital rather than go through waiting lists. Prescription charges would also be waived.

== Online assistance ==
The Legion sponsors a website, CivvyStreet.org, which assists Service leavers and members of the ex-Service community and their dependents with information, advice and guidance (IAG) on resettlement, learning and work. Specialist services are provided by partner organisations. Opportunities for funding may also be available to those who qualify for assistance. The website has been designed to give a single gateway to the services and support that partners provide for resettlement, learning and work.

== Controversies ==
=== Donations ===
In September 2009, the Legion accepted a donation from Rachel Firth, a member of the British National Party (BNP). She raised money by spending 24 hours in a cardboard box, giving half to the BNP and half to the Legion. Initially, the donation was rejected, but, after Firth gave an assurance that its giving would not be "exploited politically", it was accepted.

In August 2010, Tony Blair pledged the proceeds of his memoirs, A Journey, to the Legion, "as a way of marking the enormous sacrifice [the armed forces] make for the security of our people and the world". This included a £4.6 million advance, making it the largest single donation in the charity's history. Chris Simpkins, the Legion's Director General, said he was delighted with what he called "this very generous" offer and the Legion announced that it would be used to help fund its planned "Battle Back" challenge, a project to provide state-of-the-art rehabilitation services for troops returning from the frontline with serious injuries. Amongst the generally favourable reaction to the news, some anti-war campaigners and families of soldiers killed during the wars in Iraq and in Afghanistan claimed the donation was "blood money" and a public relations stunt.

=== Subscriptions ===
In 2015, in North Wales, the introduction of subscription changes prompted a number of associated clubs to leave the Legion, including Colwyn Bay and Conwy, with others voting on also doing so.

=== Royal British Legion Women's Section ===
The Royal British Legion Women's Section (RBLWS) was founded in 1921 and operated independently for some 96 years, with its own branches, standards and standard bearers, county branches, income and expenditure, national central committee, and annual conference. In mid-December 2015, with minimal consultation with the RBLWS, the Royal British Legion wrote to all RBLWS branches announcing its decision to integrate the Women's Section into itself by October 2016, when the RBLWS would become a "district" of the RBL, no longer operating as a separate organisation. Its national standard would no longer appear at the Cenotaph on Remembrance Sunday and would be “laid up”, never to be used again. The RBLWS national officers had been told about this in advance, but they were also told to treat the information as confidential, so that they could not fore-warn their members. This speedily led to mass protests and branch closures. By September 2016, public perception of the RBL had fallen to its lowest level in four years.

The RBLWS was still in existence in 2019, with a central committee of seven members and with its chairman having a seat on the RBL Board of Trustees. By then its substantial funds had been integrated into the accounts of the RBL.

=== 2017 employment tribunal ===
A former Royal British Legion case officer won a tribunal case in November 2017, exposing a culture of bullying and HR negligence that led to her wrongful dismissal. The employment tribunal heard that there was a culture of bullying in the HR function at the RBL HQ and the entire HR department had left the charity.

== Bands ==
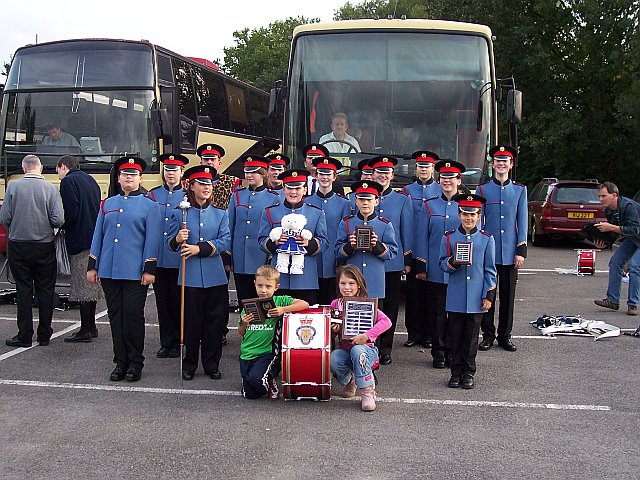
The Kings Norton Royal British Legion Youth Marching Band in 2006.

There are over 50 Legion bands around the world, each run and funded independently. They include full concert show bands, brass ensembles, pipe and drum bands, marching bands and youth bands.

The Central Band of the Royal British Legion is the Legion's flagship band. In existence since 1944, the band was recognised as the Legion's premier band in 1983 and gained its title of "The Central Band of the Royal British Legion" three years later.

== Clubs ==
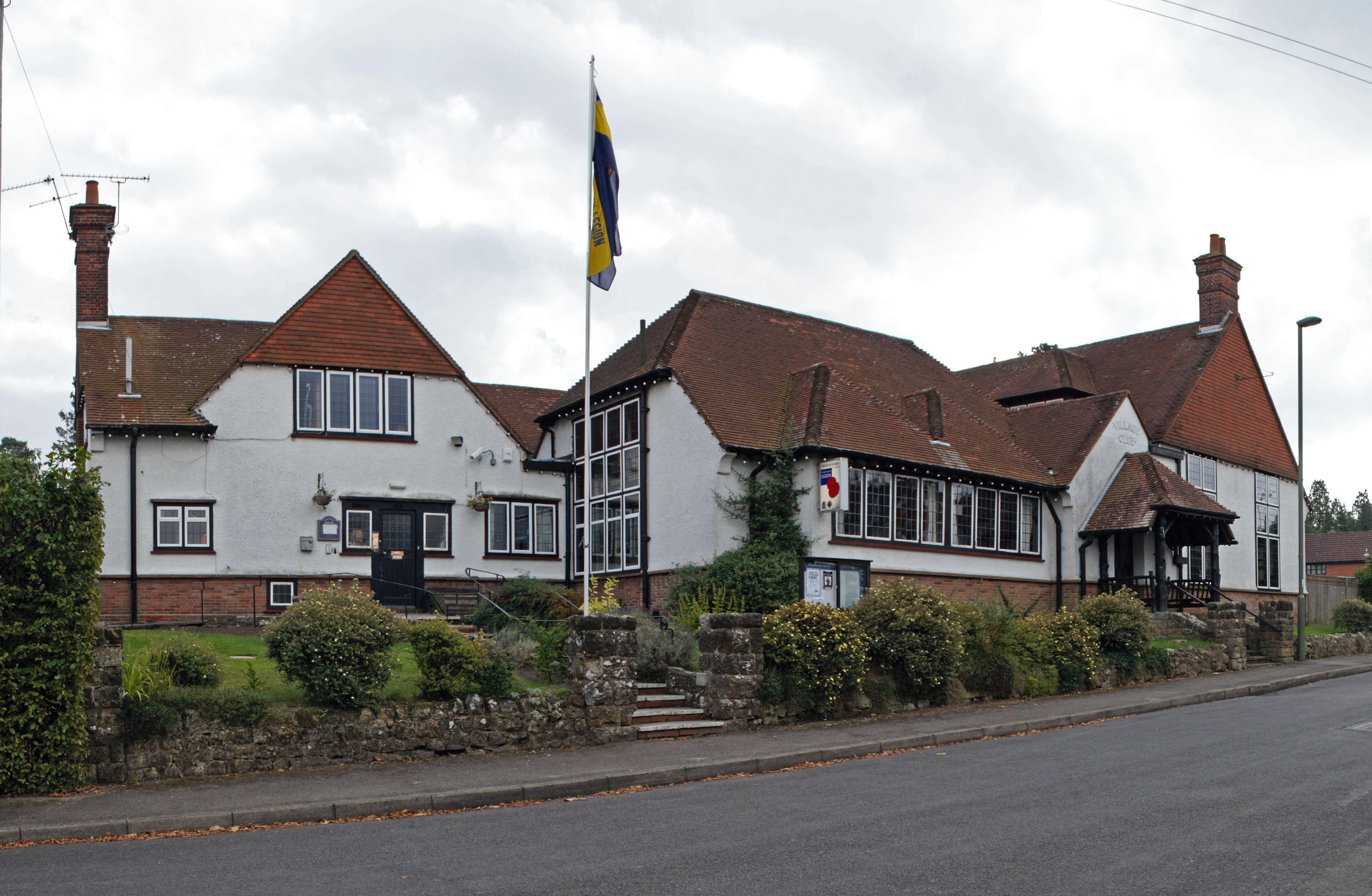
Beacon Hill, Surrey, Club

The Royal British Legion has an extensive network of Social Clubs called Legion Clubs throughout the United Kingdom. The Royal British Legion also has branches in the Republic of Ireland. Other branches are spread around the world, mostly in mainland Europe, but also in the United States, Thailand, Belize, the Falkland Islands and Hong Kong.

The Royal British Legion Riders Branch (RBLR) is a specialist worldwide branch of The Royal British Legion for motorcyclists. Its members hold events such as Weston Bike Night in Weston-super-Mare and rallies such as the RBLR 1000, a 1,000 mile in 24 hours sponsored ride, all to raise money for the Poppy Appeal. Many RBLR members attended the repatriation ceremonies in Royal Wootton Bassett. Ex-services members of the RBLR often wear medals and head-dress with their leathers and motorcycle kit.

== Scotland ==
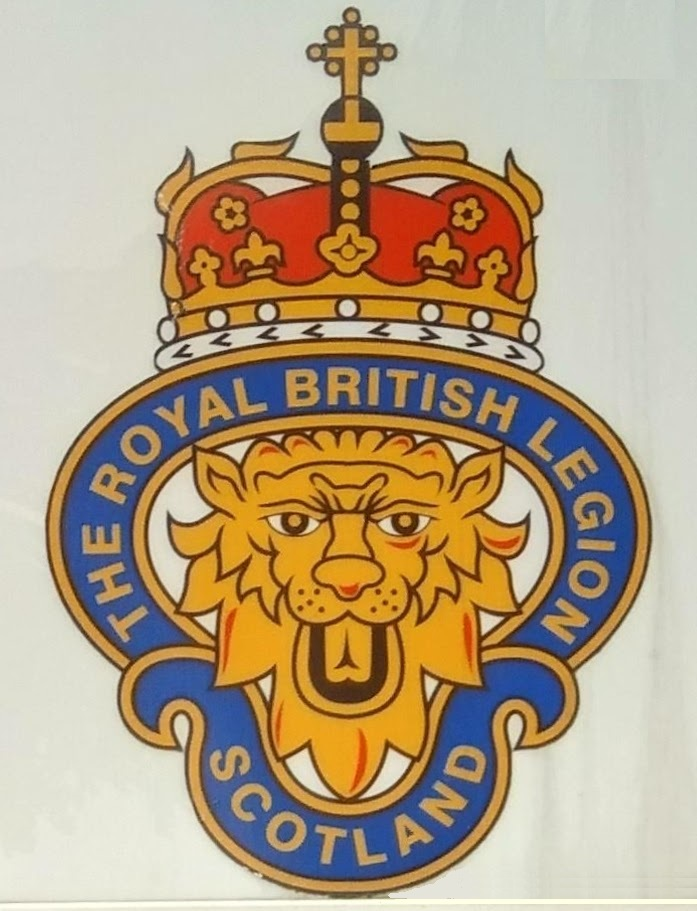
RBLS badge

Within Scotland, a sister organisation to the RBL, the Royal British Legion Scotland, operates on the same basis as the RBL functions elsewhere within the UK, and is a Registered Charity within Scotland, (SC003323).

In June 1921, Field Marshal Earl Haig formed the Royal British Legion Scotland (Legion Scotland) as it is now known, by bringing together several charities that had been established to assist those returning from the horrors of the First World War and residing in Scotland.

Around the same time the Royal British Legion, as it is now known, was also formed to assist those returning and living south of the border.

Earl Haig also established two poppy appeal funds. One was organised and delivered by the Royal British Legion in all areas other than Scotland. The second was delivered by the Earl Haig Fund Scotland, now commonly known as Poppyscotland. Whilst the Scottish Poppy Appeal is heavily supported by Legion Scotland with about one third of the annual can collection raised by its members, the appeal is owned by Poppyscotland not Legion Scotland.

— Royal British Legion Scotland: History

== Freedoms ==
The Royal British Legion and Royal British Legion Scotland (RBLS) have received the freedom of several UK local government areas.

Local government areas awarding freedom to the Royal British Legion or its branches
Date	Area	Country	Branches	Refs
1996	Castlereagh	Northern Ireland		
11 May 1996	Newtownabbey	Northern Ireland		
18 July 1996	Harrow, London	England	Harrow	
22 February 1997	Ballymoney	Northern Ireland	Ballymoney	
8 May 2004	Perth	Scotland	RBLS	
24 June 2006	Antrim	Northern Ireland		
15 October 2009	North Tyneside	England	Whitley Bay and Forest Hall	
2 October 2010	Birmingham	England	Birmingham County	
2 November 2012	Great Yarmouth	England	Great Yarmouth	
2013	Richmond, North Yorkshire	England		
18 June 2013	Burghfield, West Berkshire	England		
2014	Tamworth, Staffordshire	England		
11 June 2016	Woodbridge, Suffolk	England	Woodbridge	
4 April 2017	Hounslow, London	England	7 local branches	
7 November 2018	High Peak, Derbyshire	England	6 local branches	
28 June 2021	Torfaen	Wales		
28 July 2021	Peterborough	England	Peterborough	
28 October 2021	Newport	Wales		
4 November 2021	Blaenau Gwent	Wales		
17 November 2021	Lowestoft	England	Lowestoft and District	
25 November 2021	Stafford	England	Stafford	
24 March 2022	Gloucester	England	Gloucester	
25 March 2022	Caerphilly	Wales		
1 April 2022	Dumfries and Galloway	Scotland	RBLS	
14 August 2022	Liskeard, Cornwall	England	Liskeard	
9 September 2023	Market Drayton, Shropshire	England	Market Drayton	
28 September 2023	Maidstone, Kent	England	All Maidstone Branches	
5 September 2024	Ammanford, Carmarthenshire	Wales	Ammanford	

== See also ==
- American Legion
- Bishopric of the Forces
- National Memorial Day Concert (USA), patterned after the RBL's Festival of Remembrance
- Remembrance Day
- Remembrance Sunday
- Returned and Services League of Australia
- Royal Canadian Legion
- Royal New Zealand Returned and Services' Association
- South African Legion of Military Veterans
- Veterans' Legion of Indonesia
- Royal Naval Association
