= Sowerby (constituency) =

Parliamentary constituency in the United Kingdom, 1885–1983

Coordinates: 53.705°N 1.937°W

- Former county constituency for the House of Commons
- Sowerby in Yorkshire, 1885–1918
- County: West Riding of Yorkshire

1885–1983
- Seats: One
- Created from: Northern West Riding of Yorkshire
- Replaced by: Calder Valley and Halifax

Sowerby (/ˈsoʊərbi, ˈsaʊərbi/) was a county constituency centred on the village of Sowerby in Calderdale, West Yorkshire. It returned one Member of Parliament (MP) to the House of Commons of the Parliament of the United Kingdom.

== History ==
The constituency was created for the 1885 general election, and abolished for the 1983 general election, when it was largely replaced by the new Calder Valley constituency.

== Boundaries ==
1885–1918:

1918–1950: The Municipal Borough of Todmorden, the Urban Districts of Barkisland, Hebden Bridge, Luddendenfoot, Midgley, Mytholmroyd, Rishworth, Sowerby, Sowerby Bridge, and Soyland, the Rural District of Todmorden, and the civil parish of Norland in the Rural District of Halifax.

1950–1983: The Municipal Borough of Todmorden, the Urban Districts of Elland, Hebden Royd, Ripponden, and Sowerby Bridge, and the Rural District of Hepton.

== Members of Parliament ==
Election	Member	Party
1885	Edward Crossley	Liberal
1892	John William Mellor	Liberal
1904	John Sharp Higham	Liberal
1918	Robert Hewitt Barker	Independent NADSS
1922	William Simpson-Hinchliffe	Unionist
1923	Arnold Williams	Liberal
1924	Geoffrey Shaw	Unionist
1929	William John Tout	Labour
1931	Malcolm McCorquodale	Conservative
1945	John Belcher	Labour
1949	Douglas Houghton	Labour
1974	Max Madden	Labour
1979	Donald Thompson	Conservative
1983	constituency abolished	

== Elections ==
=== Elections in the 1880s ===
General election 1885: Sowerby
Party	Candidate	Votes	%	±%
Liberal	Edward Crossley	6,427	68.5	
Conservative	Frederick Milner	2,960	31.5	
Majority		3,467	37.0	
Turnout		9,387	82.6	
Registered electors		11,364		
Liberal win (new seat)				

General election 1886: Sowerby
Party	Candidate	Votes	%	±%
Liberal	Edward Crossley	Unopposed		
Liberal hold				

=== Elections in the 1890s ===
Mellor

General election 1892: Sowerby
Party	Candidate	Votes	%	±%
Liberal	John William Mellor	5,754	63.4	N/A
Liberal Unionist	Henry Tipping Crook	3,324	36.6	New
Majority		2,430	26.8	N/A
Turnout		9,078	75.9	N/A
Registered electors		11,963		
Liberal hold		Swing	N/A	

General election 1895: Sowerby
Party	Candidate	Votes	%	±%
Liberal	John William Mellor	5,328	58.7	−4.7
Conservative	John Bailey*	3,753	41.3	+4.7
Majority		1,575	17.4	−9.4
Turnout		9,081	77.7	+1.8
Registered electors		11,686		
Liberal hold		Swing	−4.7	

*Some sources describe Bailey as a Liberal Unionist.

=== Elections in the 1900s ===
Mellor

General election 1900: Sowerby
Party	Candidate	Votes	%	±%
Liberal	John William Mellor	5,528	57.6	−1.1
Conservative	John Bailey	4,067	42.4	+1.1
Majority		1,461	15.2	−2.2
Turnout		9,595	80.0	+2.3
Registered electors		11,998		
Liberal hold		Swing	-1.1	

- some sources describe as Liberal Unionist

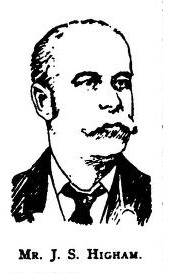

1904 Sowerby by-election
Party	Candidate	Votes	%	±%
Liberal	John Sharp Higham	6,049	60.9	+3.3
Conservative	William Simpson-Hinchliffe	3,877	39.1	−3.3
Majority		2,172	21.8	+6.6
Turnout		9,926	80.6	+0.6
Registered electors		12,311		
Liberal hold		Swing	+3.3	

General election 1906: Sowerby
Party	Candidate	Votes	%	±%
Liberal	John Sharp Higham	6,482	61.6	+4.0
Conservative	William Simpson-Hinchliffe	4,034	38.4	−4.0
Majority		2,448	23.2	+8.0
Turnout		10,516	84.2	+4.2
Registered electors		12,492		
Liberal hold		Swing	+4.0	

=== Elections in the 1910s ===
General election January 1910: Sowerby
Party	Candidate	Votes	%	±%
Liberal	John Sharp Higham	6,811	58.8	−2.8
Conservative	William Simpson-Hinchliffe	4,781	41.2	+2.8
Majority		2,030	17.6	−5.6
Turnout		11,592	90.5	+6.3
Registered electors		12,805		
Liberal hold		Swing	-2.8	

General election December 1910: Sowerby
Party	Candidate	Votes	%	±%
Liberal	John Sharp Higham	Unopposed		
Liberal hold				

General election 1918: Sowerby
Party	Candidate	Votes	%	±%
Ind. Unionist	Robert Hewitt Barker*	8,287	37.0	New
Labour	John William Ogden	7,306	32.7	New
Liberal	John Sharp Higham	6,778	30.2	N/A
Majority		981	4.3	N/A
Turnout		22,371	65.2	N/A
Ind. Unionist gain from Liberal		Swing	N/A	

* An official Unionist candidate was selected ahead of the election, but when the writ for the election was issued, the Coalition Whips ordered the local Unionists to withdraw the candidate in favour of Higham – who was given the Coalition Coupon but then repudiated it.
Some local Unionists were angered by this state of affairs, and persuaded the local branch of the NADSS to sponsor Barker, who was known to be a Conservative. Barker then received considerable support from local Unionists during the campaign. There is no information on whether he took a whip in the House of Commons, but he voted fairly consistently with the coalition.

=== Elections in the 1920s ===
General election 1922: Sowerby
Party	Candidate	Votes	%	±%
Unionist	William Simpson-Hinchliffe	11,710	39.9	N/A
Liberal	Arnold Williams	8,144	27.7	−2.5
Labour	John William Ogden	7,496	25.5	−7.2
National Liberal	Frank Roebuck	2,023	6.9	−23.3
Majority		3,566	12.2	N/A
Turnout		29,373	83.9	+18.7
Unionist gain from Independent		Swing	N/A	

General election 1923: Sowerby
Party	Candidate	Votes	%	±%
Liberal	Arnold Williams	11,350	39.6	+11.9
Unionist	William Simpson-Hinchliffe	9,932	34.6	−5.3
Labour	Arthur Dawson	7,389	25.8	+0.3
Majority		1,418	5.0	17.2
Turnout		28,671	81.0	−2.9
Liberal gain from Unionist		Swing	+8.6	

General election 1924: Sowerby
Party	Candidate	Votes	%	±%
Unionist	Geoffrey Shaw	11,181	37.8	+3.2
Liberal	Arnold Williams	9,480	32.1	−7.5
Labour	Arthur Dawson	8,881	30.1	+4.3
Majority		1,701	5.7	N/A
Turnout		29,542	83.2	+2.2
Unionist gain from Liberal		Swing	+5.3	

General election 1929: Sowerby
Party	Candidate	Votes	%	±%
Labour	William John Tout	14,223	37.2	+7.1
Unionist	Arthur Colegate	12,057	31.6	−6.2
Liberal	Thomas George Graham	11,890	31.2	−0.9
Majority		2,166	5.6	N/A
Turnout		38,170	83.4	+0.2
Labour gain from Unionist		Swing	+6.6	

=== Elections in the 1930s ===
General election 1931: Sowerby
Party	Candidate	Votes	%	±%
Conservative	Malcolm McCorquodale	25,511	68.27	
Labour	William John Tout	11,857	31.73	
Majority		13,654	36.54	N/A
Turnout		37,368	81.05	
Conservative gain from Labour		Swing		

General election 1935: Sowerby
Party	Candidate	Votes	%	±%
Conservative	Malcolm McCorquodale	18,707	53.9	−14.4
Labour	William John Tout	16,035	46.2	+14.5
Majority		2,672	7.7	−28.8
Turnout		34,742	75.9	−5.1
Conservative hold		Swing		

General Election 1939–40:

Another General Election was required to take place before the end of 1940. The political parties had been making preparations for an election to take place from 1939 and by the end of this year, the following candidates had been selected;

- Conservative: Malcolm McCorquodale
- Labour: Cyril Hackett Wilkinson

=== Elections in the 1940s ===
General election 1945: Sowerby
Party	Candidate	Votes	%	±%
Labour	John Belcher	17,710	50.8	+4.6
Conservative	Malcolm McCorquodale	10,777	30.9	−23.0
Liberal	Douglas Eugene Moore	6,373	18.3	New
Majority		6,933	19.9	N/A
Turnout		34,860	82.0	+6.1
Labour gain from Conservative		Swing		

1949 Sowerby by-election
Party	Candidate	Votes	%	±%
Labour	Douglas Houghton	18,606	53.0	+2.2
Conservative	Paul Bryan	16,454	47.0	+16.1
Majority		2,152	6.0	−13.9
Turnout		35,060		
Labour hold		Swing		

=== Elections in the 1950s ===
General election 1950: Sowerby
Party	Candidate	Votes	%	±%
Labour	Douglas Houghton	22,846	45.4	−5.4
Conservative	Paul Bryan	19,181	38.1	+7.2
Liberal	Adrian Liddell Hart	8,306	16.5	New
Majority		3,665	7.3	−12.6
Turnout		50,333	88.3	+6.3
Labour hold		Swing		

General election 1951: Sowerby
Party	Candidate	Votes	%	±%
Labour	Douglas Houghton	22,766	46.1	+0.7
Conservative	Paul Bryan	21,118	42.7	+4.6
Liberal	John G Walker	5,573	11.3	−5.2
Majority		1,648	3.4	−3.9
Turnout		49,457	86.9	−1.4
Labour hold		Swing		

General election 1955: Sowerby
Party	Candidate	Votes	%	±%
Labour	Douglas Houghton	20,092	45.2	−0.9
Conservative	Betty Harvie Anderson	17,309	38.9	−3.8
Liberal	John G Walker	7,046	15.9	+4.6
Majority		2,783	6.3	+2.9
Turnout		44,447	81.4	−5.5
Labour hold		Swing		

General election 1959: Sowerby
Party	Candidate	Votes	%	±%
Labour	Douglas Houghton	18,949	43.5	−1.7
Conservative	Robert Kenyon McKim	16,993	39.0	+0.1
Liberal	John G Walker	7,654	17.6	+1.7
Majority		1,956	4.5	−1.8
Turnout		43,596	83.0	+1.6
Labour hold		Swing		

=== Elections in the 1960s ===
General election 1964: Sowerby
Party	Candidate	Votes	%	±%
Labour	Douglas Houghton	21,582	54.2	+10.7
Conservative	Robert Kenyon McKim	18,220	45.8	+6.8
Majority		3,362	8.4	+3.9
Turnout		39,802	79.5	−3.5
Labour hold		Swing		

General election 1966: Sowerby
Party	Candidate	Votes	%	±%
Labour	Douglas Houghton	21,591	56.9	+2.7
Conservative	William G Burman	16,361	43.1	−2.7
Majority		5,230	13.8	+5.4
Turnout		37,952	77.7	−1.8
Labour hold		Swing		

=== Elections in the 1970s ===
General election 1970: Sowerby
Party	Candidate	Votes	%	±%
Labour	Douglas Houghton	16,583	43.8	−13.1
Conservative	William G Burman	16,114	42.6	−0.5
Liberal	David Shutt	5,137	13.6	New
Majority		469	1.2	−12.6
Turnout		37,834	75.6	−2.1
Labour hold		Swing		

General election February 1974: Sowerby
Party	Candidate	Votes	%	±%
Labour	Max Madden	14,492	36.1	−7.7
Conservative	Donald Thompson	14,377	35.8	−6.8
Liberal	David Shutt	11,254	28.1	+14.5
Majority		115	0.3	−0.9
Turnout		40,123	83.0	+7.4
Labour hold		Swing		

General election October 1974: Sowerby
Party	Candidate	Votes	%	±%
Labour	Max Madden	14,971	38.8	+2.7
Conservative	Donald Thompson	14,325	37.1	+1.3
Liberal	David Shutt	9,136	23.7	−4.4
More Prosperous Britain	Harold Smith	157	0.4	New
Majority		646	1.7	+1.4
Turnout		38,589	80.7	−2.3
Labour hold		Swing		

General election 1979: Sowerby
Party	Candidate	Votes	%	±%
Conservative	Donald Thompson	16,797	42.2	+5.1
Labour	Max Madden	15,617	39.3	+0.5
Liberal	David Shutt	7,369	18.5	−5.2
Majority		1,180	2.9	N/A
Turnout		39,783	80.7	0.0
Conservative gain from Labour		Swing		
