= Oliver Gledhill =

English cellist

Oliver Gledhill is an English cellist.

Gledhill is Professor of Cello at Junior Guildhall and also teaches at Mill Hill School. He was a Scholar at the Guildhall School of Music and won the ISTEL/Redditch Music Society Competition. He studied with the cellists William Pleeth, Edmund Kurtz and André Navarra.

He has given recitals at the Wigmore Hall and Purcell Room, including three in the Kirckman Concert Society Series. Festival appearances have included solo performances in England, France, Italy, Mallorca and the Czech Republic. Gledhill has recorded eight CDs, including the complete works by Leon Boellmann, which was awarded five stars for performance by BBC Music Magazine, and has been played on ABC Classic FM (Australian Radio) and RTBF musiq3 (Belgian Radio).

In 2013 Gledhill completed a PhD at the Royal Academy of Music on cellist-composer WH Squire (1871–1963), his cello miniatures and the use of portamento. On Sunday 20 January 2013 Oliver Gledhill, accompanied by Tadashi Imai on piano, gave a concert "The best of WH Squire for cello" at Duke's Hall, Royal Academy of Music to mark the 50th anniversary of the death of WH Squire. The cello miniatures were presented with descriptions and illustrations in the context of the life and work of WH Squire.

Gledhill is an adjudicator for the British and International Federation of Festivals (known as BIFF), adjudicating music festivals across the British Isles. He was a member of the adjudication team at the Manx Music Speech and Dance Festival in 2026. He is also an examiner for Trinity College London.

Recordings include:

- Cello Serenade
- Paul Müller-Zürich
- The Eye of the Storm
- Philipp Christoph Kayser
- French Romanticism I – Léon Boëllmann
