= George Lynskey =

British jurist (1888–1957)

Sir George Lynskey

Justice of the High Court
- In office 1944 – 21 December 1957

Personal details
- Born: George Justin Lynskey; 5 February 1888
- Died: 21 December 1957 (aged 69)
- Education: St Francis Xavier's College, Liverpool; University of Liverpool

Sir George Justin Lynskey (5 February 1888 – 21 December 1957) was an English jurist, particularly remembered for his role in investigating the political scandal that led to the eponymous Lynskey tribunal.

== Early life and legal career ==
Lynskey was born in Knotty Ash, Liverpool, the son of solicitor George Jeremy (1861–1921) who had himself been born in Ireland and sat on Liverpool City Council as alderman representing the Irish National League. Lynskey had three younger brothers and two sisters and was educated at St. Francis Xavier's College then at the University of Liverpool. He earned an LLB (1907) and LLM (1908). He entered his father's practice as a solicitor in 1910, marrying Eileen Mary Prendiville in 1913. The couple had two daughters.

In 1920 Lynskey took up the profession of a barrister, being called to the bar by the Inner Temple. He practised on the northern circuit, building up one of the largest provincial practices of the time and becoming a KC in 1930. David Maxwell Fyfe, a future prosecutor at the Nuremberg Trials and Lord Chancellor was one of his pupils and praised Lynskey's geniality and conviviality. He became a bencher of the Inner Temple in 1938 and a judge of the Salford Hundred Court of Record in 1937.

== Judicial career ==
In 1944, a provincial barrister educated at a redbrick university with little exposure to the London bar or specialist practice was an unusual appointment for a High Court judge. However, he was appointed to the King's Bench and became a judge in criminal trials at various assizes around England and Wales.

In 1945, he sat with Lord Chief Justice Lord Goddard and Mr Justice Humphreys in the Court of Criminal Appeal in William Joyce's appeal against his conviction for treason during World War II. The court rejected Joyce's appeal. His most prominent role was as chair of the 1948 eponymous tribunal into alleged corruption among government ministers and civil servants. Lynskey won high praise for his handling of the inquiry but declined appointment as Lord Justice of Appeal when offered by the Lord Chancellor, the Earl Jowitt.

== Personality and death ==
Lynskey was comfortable with popular culture, a keen follower of sport, especially cricket and football. He supported Everton F.C. and, during the tribunal, was minded to correct Attorney-General Hartley Shawcross as to the date the football season had ended.

After completing an assize in Manchester in 1957, he collapsed with coronary thrombosis and died soon after in Manchester Royal Infirmary. Lynskey was a devout Roman Catholic and Archbishop William Godfrey officiated at his requiem mass. He was buried at Brooklands cemetery, Weybridge, on 31 December.

== Honours ==
- Rupert Bremner gold medal of the Law Society (1910)
- LLD, University of Liverpool (1951)

== Bibliography ==
- Obituaries
  - The Times, 23 December 1957
  - Law Times, 3 January 1958
  - St Francis Xavier's College Magazine (1957)

- [Anon.] (1948) "The Bribes Tribunal Judge is Every Inch an Irishman", Sunday Pictorial, 12 December
- Bryson, G. (2004) "Lynskey, Sir George Justin (1888–1957)", Oxford Dictionary of National Biography, Oxford University Press, accessed 21 July 2007 (subscription, Wikipedia Library access or UK public library membership required)
- Waller, P. J. (1981). Democracy and Sectarianism: A Political and Social History of Liverpool, 1868–1939. Liverpool: Liverpool University Press. ISBN 0853230749.
