= National Association of Discharged Sailors and Soldiers =

British veterans' organisation

The National Association of Discharged Sailors and Soldiers (NADSS) was a British veterans' organisation.

The group was founded in early 1917 at a conference in Blackburn, drawing together various local groups representing working men who had served in World War I but had since been discharged. It campaigned for better pensions, and more opportunities for re-training. Led by James Howell, it developed links with trade unions and the Labour Party.

The association sponsored several candidates at the 1918 general election, forming part of what was termed the "Silver Badge Party". Robert Hewitt Barker was elected in Sowerby, having been endorsed by the local branch, but not by the executive, and acting essentially as an independent Conservative.

Around this time, the group severed its links with the labour movement, and became more conservative in outlook, moving closer to the Comrades of the Great War group. In 1919, J.M. Hogge replaced Howell as President. In 1921, it merged with the Comrades group, the National Federation of Discharged and Demobilized Sailors and Soldiers and the Officers' Association to form the British Legion.
