= Returned and Services' Association =

Organization in New Zealand

Royal New Zealand Returned and Services Association
- Official logo
- Abbreviation: RSA
- Formation: 1916
- Type: Health and Welfare organisation
- Legal status: Charity
- Location(s): 181 Willis Street, Wellington, New Zealand
- Region served: Worldwide
- Members: 98,642 (2018)
- National president: Wayne Shelford
- Main organ: National Council
- Affiliations: Royal Commonwealth Ex-Services League (RCEL)
- Website: www.rsa.org.nz

The Returned and Services' Association, (officially, the Royal New Zealand Returned and Services' Association and best known simply as the RSA), is one of the largest voluntary welfare organisations in New Zealand and one of the oldest ex-service organisations in the world.

Wounded soldiers returning from the Gallipoli Campaign founded the organisation in 1916, and it received royal patronage in 1920. The RNZRSA celebrated its 100th anniversary in 2016.

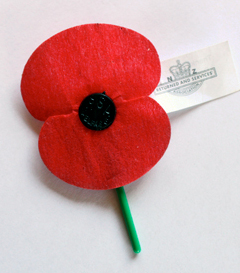
The Flanders poppy distributed by the RSA throughout New Zealand to raise money for the health and well-being of all service personnel and their families.

Poppy Day is usually observed on the Friday before Anzac Day (25 April), New Zealand's national day of commemoration.

Remembrance plays a special part in the life of the RSA. A moment of silence is generally observed daily at RSA club rooms in memory of comrades. On ANZAC Day and on other special anniversaries, local RSAs play a significant part in wreath-laying ceremonies of remembrance. As of 2014, 103,574 members supported a network of 180 local RSAs throughout New Zealand. RSA membership is open to everyone. The badge is still one of the most familiar icons in New Zealand.
