= Joseph Gledhill =

British astronomer

Joseph Gledhill (17 November 1837 – 20 March 1906) was a British astronomer. He worked as an assistant at the Bermerside Observatory in Halifax, West Yorkshire, England.

In 1879 he co-authored the book A Handbook of Double Stars with Edward Crossley and Rev. James Wilson (who was later Canon of Worcester). Gledhill was elected a Fellow of the Royal Meteorological Society on 15 November 1865 and a Fellow of the Royal Astronomical Society on 8 May 1874.

A crater on Mars is named in his honour.

== Obituary ==
- MNRAS 67 (1907) 232
