= Officers' Association =

Officer's Association
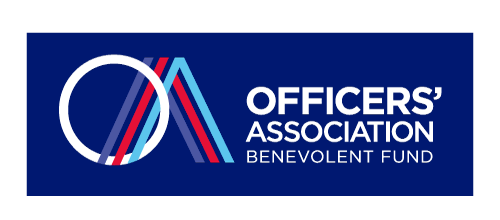
- Abbreviation: OA or OABF
- Formation: February 1920
- Founder: Field Marshal Douglas Haig, 1st Earl Haig
- Merger of: Existing officers' assistance charities
- Type: Serving and former, tri-service, officer organisation
- Registration no.: 201321
- Legal status: Charity
- Headquarters: Reading
- Region served: Worldwide
- Patron: The King
- Key people: Chairman: Alex Spofforth BA FCA
- Website: https://www.officersassociation.org.uk/

The Officers' Association (OA) is a British charity supporting military ex-officers and their families, founded in 1920. It received a Royal Charter on 10 June the following year and is closely associated with The Royal British Legion.

== History ==
The Officers' Association has a history of supporting officers and their dependents. It has historically helped to address issues with officers finding employment and establishing financial stability and providing advice. For years, it ran a residential home called Huntly; however, in 2011, the residential home closed due to changing residential care requirements.
