= Comrades of the Great War =

British veterans' organisation

The Comrades of The Great War was formed in 1917 as an association to represent the rights of ex-service men and women who had served or had been discharged from service during World War I.

Their Motto was "King, Country, Comradeship"

The organisation was Empire-wide.

The trustees:

- Field Marshal the Viscount French, K.P., O.M.,
- Admiral the Lord Charles Beresford G.C.B,
- and Colonel John Ward M.P.

The organisation produced a monthly Comrades Journal with contributions to the editor at 8 Grosvenor Crescent, London SW1. Comrades of The Great War was one of the original four ex-service associations that amalgamated on Sunday 15 May 1921 to form The British Legion.

The organisation was founded by John Joseph Woodward who was also secretary and Edward Stanley, 17th Earl of Derby as a right-wing alternative to the National Association of Discharged Sailors and Soldiers (NADSS) and the National Federation of Discharged and Demobilized Sailors and Soldiers (NFDDSS). In particular, the NFDSS had put a candidate up against Derby's son in the 1917 Liverpool Abercromby by-election. Historian Niall Barr has stated that the movement was intended to "form a buttress against Bolshevism": its leader, Conservative Party MP Wilfrid Ashley was also secretary of the Anti-Socialist Union.

== Clubs ==
In 1918, the Oxted branch in Surrey was established one of about 700 in 30 counties UK wide. An organisation created to inaugurate and maintain in a strong, stimulating, united and democratic comradeship all those who have served in any capacity in the Sea, Land, and Air Forces during the Great War, so that neither their efforts nor their interests shall be forgotten or neglected.

- Comrades of the Great War Club, Coulsdon Club History - 27 June 1919
- Comrades [of the Great War] Club, Godmanchester History 1920 - 1929
- Ballyclare Comrades Football Club
