= William Simpson-Hinchliffe =

William Algernon Simpson-Hinchcliffe (1880–1963) was Conservative MP for Sowerby.

He contested the seat at a by-election in 1904 and the 1906 general election.

He won the seat in 1922, but lost it to the Liberals in 1923.

== Sources ==
- Craig, FWS, ed. (1974). British Parliamentary Election Results: 1885-1918 London: Macmillan Press. p. 448. ISBN 9781349022984.
- Whitaker's Almanack, 1905 to 1907, 1923 and 1924 editions
