= List of fairy and sprite characters =

These are fictional fairies, pixies, sprites, (etc.), listed in alphabetical order.

== A ==
Name	Origin	Medium
Abby Cadabby	Sesame Street	Live-action TV series
Ailie, a tatterdemalion	The Elves of Cintra	Book
Ainsel	Fairy Cube	Manga
Airy, Anne	Bravely Default/Bravely Second	Video game
Aisha/Layla (Crown Princess of Andros, Princess of Andros, Fairy of Waves, Fairy of the Waves, Fairy of Oceans and Tides, Fairy of Fluids, Guardian Fairy of the Kingdom of Andros)	Winx Club, Fate: The Winx Saga	Animated TV series, animated film, comic/fumetti, live-action TV series, video game
Aisling	The Secret of Kells	Animated Film
Alala	Mermaid Melody Pichi Pichi Pitch Pure	Anime
Albert Chamomile	Mahou Sensei Negima!	Anime, manga
Alena	Encantadia	TV series
Alfea Champions (Ress of the Flame, Shavon of the Water, Farcelia of the Wind)	Winx Club	Animated TV series
Alice (also Isabel/Sarah)	Winx Club	Animated TV series, animated film, comic
Alice (also Jenny)	Winx Club	Animated TV series, comic
Alyssa (also Zoe, Miss Magix Contestant)	Winx Club	Animated TV series
Amaryl (Fairy of Starlight)	Winx Club	Animated TV series, animated film, video game
Amihan	Encantadia	TV series
Amore (Pixie of Love, Pixie of Feelings, PopPixie of Feelings)	Winx Club, PopPixie	Animated TV series, animated film, comic
Anastacia	Winx Club	Animated TV series
Arabel	Winx Club	Animated TV series, comic
Arcadia (Fairy of the Golden Kingdom)	Winx Club	Animated TV series
Arcueid	Tsukihime	Visual novel
Ariadne	Winx Club	Animated TV series, animated film
Ariel	The Tempest	Play
Arsenio	PopPixie	Animated TV series
Athena (Guardian Pixie of Red Fountain's Codex)	Winx Club	Animated TV series
Audrey	Winx Club	Animated TV series
Aurora (Major Fairy of the North, North Fairy)	Winx Club	Animated TV series, comic

== B ==
Name	Origin	Medium
Baba	Ojamajo Doremi	Anime
Basil	A Little Snow Fairy Sugar	Anime
Basil	Johnny and the Sprites	Live-action TV series
Belbel	Petite Princess Yucie	Animated television series, manga
Belial, and Memim, Fairy helper	Jikkyō Oshaberi Parodius	Video game
Beth McGraw (Fairy for a Day)	Winx Club	Comic
Bianca	Wishenpoof!	Animated television series
Bloom (Princess of Domino, Fairy of the Dragon Flame, Fairy of Dragon Fire, Keeper of the Dragon's Flame)	Winx Club, Fate: The Winx Saga	Animated TV series, animated film, comic/fumetti, live-action TV series, video game
Blue Ethereal Fairy	Winx Club	Animated TV series
Blue Fairy	Pinocchio	Animated film
Bookmark Pixie	Winx Club	Comic
Boxen	PopPixie	Animated TV series
Breeana Devlin	Bratz: Fashion Pixiez, Bratz (ep. 33)	Animated film, animated TV series
Butterbean	Butterbean's Cafe	Animated TV series
Buttercup	Pac-Land	Video game

== C ==
Name	Origin	Medium
Camelia (PopPixie of Plants)	PopPixie	Animated TV series
Camilla (PopPixie of Illusions)	PopPixie	Animated TV series
Candy, Pop, Ricky/Ulric, Rufus/Brute, Margie/Brooha	Glitter Force/Smile Precure	Anime
Cappy	Ontama!	Anime
Caramel (also Cara, Pixie of Superstrength, PopPixie of Superstrength)	PopPixie, Winx Club	Animated TV series
Caramel, Pop, and Vanilla various	Yumeiro Pâtissière	Anime, manga
Cardan Greenbriar	The Folk of the Air	Book series
Carmen	Winx Club	Animated TV series, comic
Carol	Winx Club	Animated TV series
Carolina (Fairy of Poetry)	Winx Club, Winx on Ice	Live show
Princess Catania	Barbie Mariposa	Animated film
Celise	Winx Club	Video game
Cereal, Niina	Kero Kero Chime	Anime, manga
Cham Huau	Aura Battler Dunbine	Anime
Chatta (Pixie of Gossip, Pixie of Chatter, PopPixie of Gossip)	Winx Club, PopPixie	Animated TV series, animated film, comic
Cherie (Pixie of Weather, PopPixie of Weather)	Winx Club, PopPixie	Animated TV series
Chimera	Winx Club	Animated TV series
Chiriri	Bottle Fairy	Anime
Chloe	Disney Fairies	Animated film
Chypre, Coffret, Potpourri, Cologne, and Couppe	HeartCatch PreCure!	Anime
Ciela	The Legend of Zelda: Phantom Hourglass	Video game
Cinda	Disney Fairies	Animated film
Cindy	Winx Club	Animated TV series, comic
Cinnamon	A Little Snow Fairy Sugar	Anime
Cirno	Touhou Project	Video game
Clarice	Winx Club	Animated TV series,
Clarice	Winx Club	Animated TV series, animated film, comic
Queen Clarion	Tinker Bell (film series), Disney Fairies	Animated film
Claude, Claudette and Claudine, Dermot, Niall	The Sookie Stackhouse Novels by Charlaine Harris	Book
Clefable	Pokémon	Video game
Cleon	Bust-a-Move 4	Video game
Clessia	Winx Club	Video game
Clownpiece	Touhou Project	Video game
Cobweb, Mustard Seed, Peaseblossom, Moth	A Midsummer Night's Dream	Play
Coco, Nuts, and Syrup	Yes! PreCure 5	Anime
Concorda (Guardian Pixie of Alfea's Codex, The Psychic Pixie (4Kids))	Winx Club	Animated TV series, animated film, comic, video game
Cordelia Moon	Isadora Moon	Book series, animated TV series
Cornelia	Winx Club	Animated TV series, animated film
Corona	Doraemon: Nobita to Mittsu no Seireiseki	Anime
Cosmo Cosma and Wanda Fairywinkle-Cosma, Jorgen Von Strangle, Juandissimo Magnifico, Poof, Anti-Cosmo, Anti-Wanda	The Fairly OddParents	Animated TV series
Crysta	Ferngully: The Last Rainforest	Animated film
Cymbeline Devlin	Bratz: Fashion Pixiez	Animated film

== D ==
Name	Origin	Medium
Daffodil	Lala-Oopsies	Animation
Daichi	Shugo Chara!	Anime
Daiyousei	Touhou Project	Video game
Danaya	Encantadia	TV series
Daphne (Crown Princess of Domino, Nymph of Sirenix, Nymph of Magix, Nymph of Domino, Keeper of the Dragon's Flame (formerly), Nymph of the Fortress of Light (Comics; I11), Supreme Nymph of Magix, Guardian of the Great Dragon)	Winx Club	Animated TV series, comic, video game
Dark Bloom	Winx Club	Animated TV series
Dark Fairies (Mitzi, Sally and Darma)	Winx Club	Animated TV series
Dee Devlin	Bratz: Fashion Pixiez	Animated film
Diana	Winx Club	Animated TV series
Diana (Major Fairy of Nature, Fairy of Nature, Amazon Fairy)	Winx Club	Animated TV series, comic
Diaspro (Fairy of Gemstones, Fairy of Gemlight, Queen of Gems)	Winx Club	Animated TV series, video game
Digit (Pixie of Nanotechnology)	Winx Club, PopPixie	Animated TV series, animated film
Diletta	Winx Club	Animated TV series, comic
Disconcorda (Pixie of Cloud Tower)	Winx Club	Animated TV series
Dodo	Ojamajo Doremi	Anime
Doodle Fairies	Dragon Tales	Animated TV series
Dorcas Bouvier	Bloody Bones by Laurell K. Hamilton	Book
Dulcie	Disney Fairies	Animated film

== E ==
Name	Origin	Medium
Earth Fairies	Winx Club	Animated TV series
Eldora (Guardian of the Library of Alexandria, Fairy Godmother)	Winx Club	Animated TV Series
Eleanor	Winx Club	Animated TV series, comic
Eleanor de la Rochefeu	Winx Club	Animated TV series
Eleanora	Wonder Boy in Monster World	Video Game
Elias Ainsworth	The Ancient Magus' Bride	Manga, anime
Elina	Barbie: Fairytopia	Animated film
Elisa (Fairy of Nature)	Winx Club	Comic
Ellis	Cobra The Animation	Anime, manga
Emma	Winx Club	Animated TV series, animated film
Emily	Winx Club	Animated TV series, animated film
Emy	Winx Club	Animated TV series
Emy	Winx Club	Animated TV series, comic
Erana	Quest for Glory	Computer game
Eternity Larva	Touhou Project	Video game
Ethereal Fairies (Green Ethereal Fairy, Blue Ethereal Fairy, Orange Ethereal Fairy)	Winx Club	Animated TV series
Evy	Winx Club	Animated TV series

== F ==
Name	Origin	Medium
Fafa	Ojamajo Doremi	Anime
Fairy	Tobira o Akete	Anime
Fairy Bomber	Bomberman World, Bomberman Wars	Video game
Fairy Godmother	Cinderella	Animated film
Fairy Mary	Tinker Bell (film series), Disney Fairies	Animated film
Fairyanna	Pinkalicious & Peterrific	Animated TV series
Fanta	Faeries' Landing (Cast as a faerie by the translators)	Manhwa
Faragonda	Winx Club	Animated TV series
Fawn	Tinker Bell (film series), Disney Fairies	Animated film
Fei Liai	The Fairy Captivity	Manhwa
Felicia	Rainbow Ruby	Animated TV series
Fern	Disney Fairies	Animated film
Fern	Lala-Oopsies	Animation
Feyre Acheron, Tamlin, Rhysand, Amarantha, Lucien, Mor, Amren, Cassian, Azriel	A Court of Thorns and Roses	Book
Fira	Disney Fairies	Animated film
Fixit (PopPixie of Technomagic)	PopPixie	Animated TV series
Flappi, Choppi, Moop, and Fuup	Futari wa Pretty Cure Splash Star	Anime
Flora, Fauna, and Merryweather	Sleeping Beauty	Animated film
Flora (Fairy of Nature, Fairy of Flowers, Guardian Fairy of the Kingdom of Linphea, Princess Flora of Linphea (M02))	Winx Club, Fate: The Winx Saga	Animated TV series, animated film, comic/fumetti, video game
Florence	A Journey Through Fairyland	Film
Flower	PopPixie	Animated TV series
Flutterina	She-Ra: Princess of Power, She-Ra and the Princesses of Power	Animated TV series
Fran the Fabulous Fairy	Witch Wars by Sibeal Pounder	Book
Francine (also Dahlia; Fairy of Rivers)	Winx Club	Animated TV series, comic
Francis (Fairy of Laughter)	Winx Club	Animated TV series
Franjean	Willow (1988 film)	Movie
Fuwa	Star Twinkle PreCure	Anime

== G ==
Name	Origin	Medium
Gabby, Polly, Tucker, and Tim	Faireez	Animated TV series
Galatea (Princess of Melody, Fairy of Melody)	Winx Club	Animated TV series, comic
Genesta	King's Quest IV	Video game
The gentleman with thistle-down hair	Jonathan Strange & Mr Norrell	Book
Giga (PopPixie of Growth)	PopPixie	Animated TV series
Ginger	A Little Snow Fairy Sugar	Anime
Ginger	Disney Fairies	Animated film
Ginger	Johnny and the Sprites	Live-action TV series
Glim (PopPixie of Energy)	PopPixie	Animated TV series
Glim (also Blinky, Pixie of Fireflies)	Winx Club	Animated TV series, animated film
Glimmer	Disney Fairies	Animated film
Glinda the Good Witch	Oz books by L. Frank Baum	Book series
Gliss	Disney Fairies	Animated film
Glissandra	Disney Fairies	Animated film
Glitter	Kidd Video	Live-action / animated TV series
Grace	Disney Fairies	Animated film
Green Ethereal Fairy	Winx Club	Animated TV series
Madame Greta (former fairy)	Winx Club	Comic
Grielle	Magical Circle Guru Guru	Manga, anime
Griselda	Winx Club	Animated TV series, animated film, animated special, comic, video game
Guardian Pixies (Concorda, Athena, Discorda and Ninfea)	Winx Club	Animated TV series
Gurkie	The Secret of Platform 13	Book
Gyuki, Kodama, Inugami, Kasha, Mokurei, Ungaikyou	Yuki Yuna is a Hero	Anime

== H ==
Name	Origin	Medium
Ha-chan/Kotoha Hanami/Cure Felice	Maho Girls PreCure	Anime
Harp	Maple Story	Video game
Hawie	Driland	Video game
Hehe	Ojamajo Doremi	Anime
Heidi (also Lavigna, Miss Magix Contestant)	Winx Club	Animated TV series, comic
Higbee, Hoikendorf, and Humboldt	Pontoffel Pock & His Magic Piano by Dr. Seuss and DePatie-Freleng Enterprises	Book
Himawari	Rilu Rilu Fairilu	Anime
Hobgen	Dota Underlords	Video game
Princess Holly	Ben & Holly's Little Kingdom	Animated TV series
Holly Short	Artemis Fowl	Book
Hororo	Bottle Fairy	Anime
Humidia	Disney Fairies	Animated film
Hummy and the Fairy Tones	Suite Precure	Anime
Hydrangea	Disney Fairies	Animated film
Hyoka and Hiori Kakiuchi	Hyouketsu Kiss Mate (Strange Dragon)	Manga

== I ==
Name	Origin	Medium
Idailia	Disney Fairies	Animated film
Iolanthe	Gilbert and Sullivan's Iolanthe	Opera
Iridessa	Tinker Bell (film series), Disney Fairies	Animated film
Ivy	Disney Fairies	Animated film

== J ==
Name	Origin	Medium
Jack-in-the-Green	English folklore	Folklore
Jade	Winx Club	Animated TV series, animated film
Jade (former fairy turned witch)	Winx Club	Animated TV series
Jareth	Labyrinth	Live action movie
Jenny, Kiyo	Monster Soul	Manga
Jenny (Miss Magix Contestant)	Winx Club	Animated TV series, animated film
Jolly (Pixie of Fortune-Telling, PopPixie of Entertainment)	Winx Club, PopPixie	Animated TV series, animated film
Judith	Winx Club	Animated TV series
Judy	Winx Club	Comic
Julia	Winx Club	Comic
Justin Nimble	PopPixie	Animated TV series

== K ==
Name	Origin	Medium
Kahlil	Encantadia	TV series
Kaie	Winx Club	Animated TV series
Kalshara	Winx Club	Animated TV series
Kara	PopPixie	Animated TV series
Karina	Winx Club	Animated TV series
Katy (also Nessa/Spika, Fairy of Animals)	Winx Club	Animated TV series, comic, video game
Kaye	Tithe and Ironside by Holly Black	Book series
Kelli	Winx Club	Animated TV series
Khadija (Fairy of Rhythm)	Winx Club	Animated TV series
Kieran Kingson	The Dark Artifices by Cassandra Clare	Book series
Kiloru	Winx Club	Video game
Kimmy	Winx Club	Animated TV series
King, Elaine	The Seven Deadly Sins	Manga, anime
King Unseelie	The Dark Artifices by Cassandra Clare	Book series
King Various	Shugo Chara!	Anime
Kirarin/Ciel Kirahoshi/Cure Parfait	Kirakira Pretty Cure a la Mode	Anime
Kitty Fairy	Gabby's Dollhouse	Animated TV series
Klabautermann	Baltic Sea maritime traditions	Folklore
Krkr, Shrshr and Pkpk	gdgd Fairies	Anime
Krystal (Princess of Linphea)	Winx Club	Animated TV series, comic
Kururu	Bottle Fairy	Anime
Kururun	Tropical-Rouge! Pretty Cure	Anime
Kylie	Winx Club	Animated TV series
Kyral	Winx Club	Comic

== L ==
Name	Origin	Medium
Lala	Ojamajo Doremi	Anime
Launcelot McSnoyd (leprechaun)	Barnaby by Crockett Johnson	Comic strip
Laurel	Wings by Aprilynne Pike	Book series
Lavigne	Winx Club	Animated TV series, comic
Lazuli (former fairy turned witch)	Winx Club	Animated TV series
Leanansidhe	The Dresden Files	Book
Lee-Hona (Miss Magix Contestant)	Winx Club	Animated TV series
Leprechaun	Irish folklore	Folklore
Lesta (Miss Magix Contestant)	Winx Club	Animated TV series
Lexi	Winx Club	Animated TV series
The Lie Fairy	Yin Yang Yo!	Animated TV series
Liesel	Disney Fairies	Animated film
Lilac	Disney Fairies	Animated film
Lilac	Lala-Oopsies	Animation
Lili	La Corda D'Oro ~primo passo~	Video game
Lilly	Faedom	Video game
Lily	Disney Fairies	Animated film
Lily	Johnny and the Sprites	Live-action TV series
Lily White	Touhou Project	Video game
Lin Poo	Winx Club	Animated TV series, comic
Lina McKnight	Bratz: Fashion Pixiez	Animated film
Lip	Rilu Rilu Fairilu	Anime
Lip, Windy, Sherbet, Thiana, Ruby, Elias, Flare, Neris, Seren, the Queen, and others	Panel de Pon	Video game
Lip-Tan	Apple Lip-Tan	Manga
Livy (Pixie of Messages, PopPixie of Velocity)	Winx Club, PopPixie	Animated TV series, animated film
Locke	The Folk of the Air	Book series
Lockette (Pixie of Portals, Pixie of Direction, PopPixie of Direction, Pixie of Thresholds, Pixie of Passages)	Winx Club, PopPixie	Animated TV series, animated film, comic
Lolina (also Loni and Naomi, Fairy of Electricity, Miss Magix Contestant)	Winx Club	Animated TV series
Looma	Winx Club	Video game
Lorie	Winx Club	Animated TV series
Lulun	Futari wa Pretty Cure	Anime
Lumina	Disney Fairies	Animated film
Lumina Flowlight	Sonic Shuffle	Video game
Luminara	Disney Fairies	Animated film
Luna	Disney Fairies	Animated film
Luna	Winx Club	Animated TV series
Luna (Former Queen of Solaria)	Winx Club	Animated TV series, comic
Luna Child	Touhou Project	Video game
Ly	Rayman 2: The Great Escape	Video game
Lydia	Winx Club	Comic
Lyria	Tinker Bell (film series), Disney Fairies	Animated film

== M ==
Name	Origin	Medium
Magnolia	Disney Fairies	Animated film
Magnus Bouvier	Bloody Bones by Laurell K. Hamilton	Book
Mai Mizunara, Mitrula Paludosa, Muscaria Amantina, Porcini B. Yamadori, Virosa Amantina, Fairy Dancer, Mai's Friend, and Pipsie Malmo	Forest Fairy Five: Fairy Tale	Anime
Maia (also Maya)	Winx Club	Animated TV series, comic
Major Fairies (Aurora, Diana, Nebula, Sibylla)	Winx Club	Animated TV series
Maleficent	Sleeping Beauty	Animated film, live-action film
Marina	Tinker Bell (film series), Disney Fairies	Animated film
Queen Marion (also Mariam / Miriam)	Winx Club	Animated TV series, animated film, animated special, comic
Mariposa	Barbie Mariposa	Animated film
Mark Blackthorn	The Dark Artifices by Cassandra Clare	Book series
Martino (PopPixie of Acrobatics, PopPixie of Acrobatic Feats)	PopPixie	Animated TV series
Marzia (also Priscilla)	Winx Club	Animated TV series, animated film, comic
Mavilla	Winx Club	Animated TV series
McGillicuddy	Pontoffel Pock, Where Are You? Pontoffel Pock & His Magic Piano by Dr. Seuss and DePatie-Freleng Enterprises	Animated TV special
Meene	Dragalia Lost	Video game
Melina	Disney Fairies	Animated film
Melvino Devlin	Bratz: Fashion Pixiez	Animated film
Mepple	Futari wa Pretty Cure	Anime
Miele (also Rose)	Winx Club	Animated TV series, comic
Mignonette	Isadora Moon	Book series, animated TV series
Miki	Shugo Chara!	Anime
Mileya	Winx Club	Video game
Milk/Kurumi Mimino/Milky Rose	Yes! PreCure 5 & Yes! PreCure 5 GoGo!	Anime
Milky	Winx Club	Animated TV series
Mimi	Ojamajo Doremi	Anime
Minister of Summer (Sunflower)	Tinker Bell (film series), Disney Fairies	Animated film
Minister of Winter (Snowflake)	Tinker Bell (film series), Disney Fairies	Animated film
Mipple	Futari wa Pretty Cure	Anime
Mireska Sunbreeze, Dark Willow	Dota 2	Video game
Mirta (Fairy of Illusions)	Winx Club	Animated TV series
Mirumo	Mirumo de Pon!	Anime, manga
Mofurun	Mahou Girls Precure	Anime
Mola (PopPixie of Tunnels)	PopPixie	Animated TV series
Monarus	Bakugan	Anime, toyline
Moona the Moon Fairy	Blue's Clues	Animated TV series
Mopsa	Mopsa the Fairy by Jean Ingelow	Book
Morgana (Former Queen of Tir Nan Og, Former Earth Fairy High Queen)	Winx Club	Animated TV series, comic
Morphine	Shaman King	Anime
Morpho (PopPixie of Transformation)	PopPixie	Animated TV series, comic
Mother Fairy	Pac-Land	Video game
Mr. O'Malley	Barnaby by Crockett Johnson	Comic
Murumo	Mirumo de Pon!	Anime
Musa (Fairy of Music, Princess Musa of the Harmonic Nebula (4Kids), Guardian Fairy of the Kingdom of Melody)	Winx Club, Fate: The Winx Saga	Animated TV series, animated film, comic/fumetti, live-action TV series, video game
Myka	Disney Fairies	Animated film

== N ==
Name	Origin	Medium
Nac Mac Feegle	Various works by Terry Pratchett	Book
Nadine	Winx Club	Comic
Nakata	Humanity Has Declined	Anime, light novel
Naomi	Winx Club	Animated TV series
Navi	The Legend of Zelda: Ocarina of Time	Video game
Queen Nebula (Queen of Tir Nan Og, Former Major Fairy of Peace, Former Major Fairy of War, Former Keeper of the Ancestral Wands)	Winx Club	Animated TV series, comic
Nem	Omega Labyrinth Life	Video game
Nettle	Disney Fairies	Animated film
Nilsa	Disney Fairies	Animated film
Ninfea (also Dextia, Guardian Pixie of Pixie Village's Codex, Pixie Queen)	Winx Club, PopPixie	Animated TV series, comic
Nini	Ojamajo Doremi	Anime
Noemi	Winx Club	Animated TV series
Notte	Dragalia Lost	Video game
Nova (Fairy of Firelight)	Winx Club	Animated TV series
Nuala	The Sandman	Comic
Nymph	Creamy Mami	Anime
Nymphs of Magix (Daphne, Politea and Seven Unnamed Nymphs)	Winx Club	Animated TV series
Nymphs of Syrenix (Daphne and Politea)	Winx Club	Animated TV series
Nyx	Disney Fairies	Animated film

== O ==
Name	Origin	Medium
Oak	The Folk of the Air	Book series
Oberon	A Midsummer Night's Dream	Play
Old Fairy	Hetalia: The Beautiful World	Anime
Oleana (Countess of Tenesa)	Winx Club	Animated TV series
Oona	Legend	Movie
Orange Ethereal Fairy	Winx Club	Animated TV series
Orion	Shugo Chara!	Anime
Ortensia (also Pia)	Winx Club	Animated TV series, video game

== P ==
Name	Origin	Medium
Pafu and Aroma	Go! Princess Precure	Anime
Pai	Omega Labyrinth	Video game
Pam (PopPixie of Hand Speed, PopPixie of Fast Hand)	PopPixie	Animated TV series, comic
Pantonio	Pinkalicious & Peterrific	Animated TV Series
Papillon	La Pucelle: Tactics	Video game
Pappy	Paboo & Mojies	Anime
Paribanou	One Thousand and One Nights	Folklore
Pearlie	Pearlie	Animated TV Series
Pekorin	Kirakira Pretty Cure a la Mode	Anime
Peony	Romancing SaGa 3	Video game
Peony, Triandra and Freyr	Fire Emblem Heroes	Video game
Pepper	A Little Snow Fairy Sugar	Anime, manga
Peri	Persian culture	Folklore
Perie the Fairie	Hex	TV series
Periwinkle	Tinker Bell (film series), Disney Fairies	Animated film
Perle, Poupelin, Banane, and Orangeat	Sailor Moon Super S: The Movie	Anime
Phoebe	Kuso Kagaku Sekai Gulliver Boy	Anime
The Phryges	2024 Summer Olympics and Paralympics	Sporting event
Piff (Pixie of Sweet Dreams, PopPixie of Sweet Sleep)	Winx Club, PopPixie	Animated TV series, animated film, animated special
Pirena	Encantadia	TV series
Pirika, Kiki, Rolo, Olga	Chain Chronicle	Video game
Pix E. Flutters	Lalaloopsy	Animated TV series, toy line
Pixel Pinkie	Pixel Pinkie	Animated TV series
Pixies	Derayd	Manga
Plasto (PopPixie of Elasticity)	PopPixie	Animated TV series
Plisse	PopPixie	Animated TV series
Politea (Former Nymph of Sirenix, Nymph of Magix)	Winx Club	Animated TV series, animated film
Porun	Futari wa Pretty Cure	Anime
Prilla	Disney Fairies	Animated film
Princess Licori, Higan, and King	The Four Seasons	Anime
Primera	Magic Knight Rayearth	Anime
Princess Ozma	Oz books	Book
Princess Riva	The Legend of Dark Witch	Video game
Priscilla	Wonder Boy in Monster World	Video game
Priscilla (Fairy of Trees)	Winx Club	Animated TV series, comic
Proxi	Hyrule Warriors	Video game
Prunce	Star Twinkle PreCure	Anime
Psammead (The Sand Fairy)	Five Children and It	Book
Puck	A Midsummer Night's Dream	Play
Pururin	Nodame Cantabile	Anime

== Q ==
Name	Origin	Medium
Queen Julian, and Flower Fairy	Doraemon: Nobita to Yōsei no Kuni	Anime, video game
Queen Lurline	Oz books	Book series
Queen Mab	Romeo and Juliet, English folklore	Folklore, play
Queen Seelie	The Mortal Instruments	Book series
Quentin Quake	PopPixie	Animated TV series

== R ==
Name	Origin	Medium
Ralan	Winx Club	Video game
Ran	Shugo Chara!	Anime
Randy	Maze	Anime
Rani	Disney Fairies	Animated film
Rath Roiben Rye	Tithe and Ironside by Holly Black	Book
Rattenfänger Fairie	Problem Children Are Coming from Another World, Aren't They?	Anime
Razzly	Chrono Cross	Video game
Rhia	Disney Fairies	Animated film
Rhody (former fairy turned witch)	Winx Club	Animated TV series
Ribbon	Kirby 64: The Crystal Shards	Video game
Ribbon and Glassan	Happiness Charge Precure!	Anime
Rirumu	Mirumo de Pon!	Anime
Robin Goodfellow	Alternate name for Puck	Play
Robinson Robinson	PopPixie	Animated TV series
Romina	Winx Club	Comic
Rool	Willow (1988 film)	Movie
Root	Johnny and the Sprites	Live-action TV series
Roro	Ojamajo Doremi	Anime
Rose	Rilu Rilu Fairilu	Anime
Rosetta	Tinker Bell (film series), Disney Fairies	Animated film
Roxy (Roxy the Seventh Fairy (Issue 68), Roxy of Tir Nan Og, Fairy of Animals, Last Fairy on Earth)	Winx Club	Animated TV series, comic, video game
Ru Fe Morgan	Ah! My Goddess: The Movie	Anime
Ruth, Silky	The Ancient Magus' Bride	Anime

== S ==
Name	Origin	Medium
Sabatha (Miss Magix Contestant)	Winx Club	Animated TV series
Salt	A Little Snow Fairy Sugar	Anime, manga
Sandra	Winx Club	Animated TV series, comic
Sarah	Winx Club	Animated TV series
Sarara	Bottle Fairy	Anime
Saria	The Legend of Zelda: Ocarina of Time	Video game
Scarlet	Disney Fairies	Animated film
Selene	Winx Club	Animated TV series, animated special
Selina	Winx Club	Animated TV series, comic
Senior Fairy	Pontoffel Pock & His Magic Piano by Dr. Seuss and DePatie-Freleng Enterprises	Animated TV special
Seresa	Winx Club	Video game
Shall Fen Shall, Mythrill Rid Pod, Kathy, and Ruselle El Min	Sugar Apple Fairy Tale	Anime
Shar	Wings by Aprilynne Pike	Book series
Sharuru, Raquel, Lance, and Davi	DokiDoki! Precure	Anime
Sherri	Sisters of Wellber	Anime
Shika	Kamichu!	Anime
Shizuka Minamoto	Doraemon: Nobita and Fantastic Three Musketeers	Anime
Shobijin	Mothra (film)	Film
Shyla	Winx Club	Animated TV series, comic
Silicya (Fairy of Silica)	Winx Club	Animated TV series, animated special, comic
Sirusa	Winx Club	Video game
Sookie Stackhouse (part fairy), Niall Brigant (Sookie's great-grandfather), Adilyn Bellefleur (half fairy), Maurella (Adilyn's mother), the Crane family, and Queen Mab	True Blood HBO Series (based on The Southern Vampire Mysteries by Charlaine Harris)	TV series
Spring Sprite	Fantasia 2000	Animated film
Spike	Tinker Bell (film series), Disney Fairies	Animated film
Spring	Tinker Bell (film series), Disney Fairies	Disney Fairies
Star Sapphire	Touhou Project	Video game
Stella (Crown Princess of Solaria, Princess of the Sun and the Moon, Fairy of the Shining Sun, Fairy of the Sun and the Moon, Fairy of Sunlight, Fairy of Light, Fairy of the Sun, Moon and Stars, Guardian Fairy of the Kingdom of Solaria, Miss Solaria, Miss Magix (S1E12), Queen Stella of Solaria (S6E19 - S6E20/Future)	Winx Club, Fate: The Winx Saga	Animated TV series, animated film, comic/fumetti, live-action TV series, video game
Stella	Dragon Quest IX	Video game
Stella	The Wizard of the Emerald City	Book
Sunny Milk	Touhou Project	Video game
Sunny the Sunshine Fairy	Team Umizoomi	Animated television series
Suffie	Übel Blatt	Anime
Sugar	A Little Snow Fairy Sugar	Anime, manga
Sugar Plum Fairy	The Nutcracker	Animated film
Sumire	Rilu Rilu Fairilu	Anime
Suu	Shugo Chara!	Anime
Sweetpea	Disney Fairies	Animated film
Sylphy, Tiramie, Salama, Kiseki, and Mouffle various	Amagi Brilliant Park	Anime
Syrup	Leviathan: The Last Defense	Anime, video game

== T ==
Name	Origin	Medium
Tamani	Wings by Aprilynne Pike	Book
Tarte and Chiffon	Fresh Precure!	Anime
Tatl and Tael	The Legend of Zelda: Majora's Mask	Video game
Tecna (Fairy of Technology, Fairy of Technomagic, Princess Tecna of Titania (Comics; up to I90), Guardian Fairy of the Kingdom of Zenith)	Winx Club, Fate: The Winx Saga	Animated TV series, animated film, comic/fumetti, video game
Thea	Winx Club	Comic
Three Golden Goddesses	The Legend of Zelda: Ocarina of Time	Video game
Tiana	Kaze no Stigma	Anime
Tily	Rayman Arena	Video game
Tinker Bell	Peter Pan, Disney Fairies	Animated film, book, manga, graphic novel
Dark Fairy Queen Tinkerbell	World of Winx	Animated Netflix series
Titania	A Midsummer Night's Dream	Play
Toot-Toot	The Dresden Files	Book series
Toothiana (Tooth fairy)	Rise of the Guardians	Animated film
Toto	Ojamajo Doremi	Anime
Traveling Pixie (Pixie of Travels)	PopPixie	Comic
Trista	Winx Club	Animated TV series, animated film, comic
Tufa	The Hum and the Shiver	Book
Tulip	Lala-Oopsies	Animation
Tune (Pixie of Etiquette, Pixie of Good Manners, PopPixie of Vocal Power)	Winx Club, PopPixie	Animated TV series, animated film, comic
Tup Smatterpit	Steve Berman's short story The Price of Glamour	Book
Twinkle Starglitter	Super 4 (TV series)	TV series
Twire	Disney Fairies	Animated film

== V ==
Name	Origin	Medium
Various characters	Disney Fairies, including the Tinker Bell movies	Animated film, book
Venus	Winx Club	Animated TV series, comic
Vicky	Winx Club	Animated TV series
Vidia	Tinker Bell (film series), Disney Fairies	Animated film
Viola	Tinker Bell (film series), Disney Fairies	Animated film
Violet	Disney Fairies	Animated film
Vogelein	Vögelein: Clockwork Faerie	Graphic novel

== W ==
Name	Origin	Medium
Wanda	Mario & Wario	Video game
Wee Willie Winkie	Scottish nursery rhyme	Nursery rhyme
Were	Ojamajo Doremi	Anime
Winx Club	Winx Club	Animated TV series, animated film, animated special, comic/fumetti, video game
Wirena	Winx Club	Animated TV series, video game
Wisp	Disney Fairies	Animated film

== Y ==
Name	Origin	Medium
Yomi	Winx Club	Comic
Yoru	Shugo Chara!	Anime

== Z ==
Name	Origin	Medium
Zarina	Tinker Bell (film series), Disney Fairies	Animated film
Zephyr	Tinker Bell (film series), Disney Fairies	Animated film
Zing (Pixie of Bugs, PopPixie of Insects)	Winx Club, PopPixie	Animated TV series, animated film, animated special, comic
Zoe/Zooi	Spyro the Dragon	Video game
Zuzu	Disney Fairies	Animated film
