= Spells (novel) =

2010 novel by Aprilynne Pike

- U.S. Cover of Spells
- Author: Aprilynne Pike
- Cover artist: Mark Tucker
- Language: English
- Genre: Young adult, Fantasy, Romance
- Publisher: HarperTeen (US); HarperCollins (UK)
- Publication date: May 4, 2010
- Publication place: United States
- Media type: Print (Hardcover, Paperback) e-Book; Audiobook
- Pages: 368 (US Hardcover); 356 (UK Paperback)
- ISBN: 0-06-166806-0
- Preceded by: Wings
- Followed by: Illusions; Destined

Spells is a fantasy novel by author Aprilynne Pike. It is the sequel to Pike's #1 New York Times best-selling debut, Wings, which introduced readers to Laurel Sewell, a faerie sent among humans to guard the gateway to Avalon. Spells was released in the United States on May 4, 2010, and debuted on the New York Times Best Seller list. It also debuted on the Indie Bestsellers list.

== Plot summary ==
Six months have passed since the events of the first book. Laurel has summer vacation and has been summoned to spend eight weeks at the academy of Avalon. Tamani, who is still disappointed that she chose David over him, meets her and escorts her to the gate. Jamison welcomes her back to Avalon and tells her that the gates were made by King Oberon (at the cost of his life) and that Winter faeries are the only ones who can open them. At the academy, Laurel is surprised to learn that it was her home, not just a school. She is introduced to professor Yeardley, who gives her a stack of books to read, and told that Katya, another Fall faerie, has agreed to tutor her. The next morning, Katya comes to Laurel's room and finds Laurel making note cards. She asks Laurel why she didn't summon one of the staff—who are all Spring faeries—to cut the cards, then summons one for her. Laurel is uncomfortable about Spring faeries being summoned for trivial tasks.

Later, Tamani comes to visit Laurel. He bows and greets her formally, but hugs her once they are out of sight of other faeries. He explains that the academy is very strict on protocol between Spring and Fall faeries. Laurel wants to see Avalon, so Tamani takes her to where the Summer faeries live. She becomes frustrated that Tamani is walking behind her when she doesn't know where they are going. Because Laurel is more than one 'rank' above Tamani, he has to walk behind her. Laurel asks to see where the Spring faeries live and Tamani takes her to his mother's house. This confuses Laurel; she was told faeries don't have parents, but Tamani corrects her that Fall and Winter faeries don't. They are separated from their parents so they can better fulfil their duties. Even the records of the two faeries who created her seed were destroyed when she sprouted. Though frustrated, she admits that it is better than two faeries missing her for years whilst she grew up in the human world. At his mother's house, Tamani introduces Laurel to his mother, Rhoslyn and his niece, who's a Summer faerie. Laurel asks if Tamani has a father, and Tamani says he did, until about a month ago.

Back at the academy, Laurel finishes her reading and starts to join actual classes, where Katya points out another Fall faerie called Mara, whom Laurel beat out for the position of scion. Additionally, Mara applied to study faerie poisons, but was refused. The subject has become something of a taboo ever since one Fall faerie took things too far, and study is now highly restricted. Katya hands Laurel over to Yeardley, who says he'll be teaching her defensive herbology instead of the typical rudimentary potions. Sometime later, Tamani visits again and takes Laurel on a picnic. They go up a hill to a large tree, which Tamani explains is the World Tree and is made of faeries. His father joined the tree recently; not dying, but now so inaccessible that it is as if he did. Tamani says things at the gate have been quiet—suspiciously so—which prompts Laurel to ask if he ever gets tired of being a Spring faerie, given their low social status. He argues that humans have the same hierarchy and Laurel points out that he did not choose to be a Spring faerie. Tamani insists he takes pride in it anyway; he is happy to serve and free to do as he pleases. Laurel asks if he is free to be with her; if she was ever to choose him over David, could he walk alongside her in the street? Tamani admits that he could not ask her to be with him; he would have to wait for Laurel to ask him.

Later, Laurel is packing to go home and shows Katya a photo of her and David. Katya mistakes David for an Unseelie faerie, but Laurel tells her he is a human, and that he loves her. Katya warns her that relationships between humans and faeries never end well—such as King Arthur and Guinevere. Jamison arrives to escort Laurel to the gate and tells her that Yeardley is very pleased by her progress. He adds that the activity of the trolls around the gate means Laurel will have to take a more active role in defending it, and she must be especially careful after sundown. Back home, Laurel worries that she'll never be able to catch up to her faerie peers, and David comforts her. He catches her up on everything that's happened whilst she was in Avalon; her mother's new apothecary store has opened (bought with the money from Jamison's diamond) and Chelsea is dating another student named Ryan. Laurel's father has taken the news about her being a faerie very well, but her mother has become distant. Laurel is unbothered by the demands of her human school after how intensive the academy was, and tries to reconnect with her mother. It goes well until Laurel, forgetting that she is a plant and humans are animals, gives incorrect recommendations to a customer at the apothecary store, which sparks an argument between her and her mother about how they don't talk anymore.

Fall arrives and Laurel blossoms. Chelsea asks Laurel what she wants to do after graduating, and invites Laurel and David to a house party Ryan is throwing the following week. They enjoy themselves, but Laurel spots a troll and abruptly realises that she is out very late past sundown; the perfect time for Barnes to attack her. She leaves with David, yelling to attract the trolls away from the party, then drive off. They are caught, with one of the trolls ripping out several of Laurel's petals, but are saved by a woman called Klea Wilson. Laurel and David pretend not to know what the trolls really were, and Klea tells them she has been hunting Barnes. She offers them both bodyguards, but Laurel refuses, worrying they might discover the sentries guarding her or the gate. Klea also gives David a gun, which Laurel is displeased by.

The next day, Laurel tells Tamani and Shar—another sentry—about the trolls and Klea. Tamani warns her not to trust Klea, even if she did save Laurel's life. He helps her clean the cabin, which has become dusty from months of inoccupancy, and they almost kiss. David is absent from school the next morning, and Laurel panics until he shows up and suggests they skip their afternoon classes, and takes her for a picnic. When she comes home, she finds an invitation to the festival of Samhain and a note from Tamani saying he'll escort her. On the morning of November 1, Laurel lies to David about going to Chelsea's and meets Tamani in the forest. He takes her to a ballet performed by Summer faeries and Laurel insists Tamani join her in the box for Fall faeries, which he agrees to, despite his discomfort. Laurel is dismayed to see that all the other Fall faerie women are still in bloom. The ballet is, Tamani explains, the 'original' version of A Midsummer Night's Dream. When the ballet is over, Laurel stands to clap, but Tamani tells her that since Summer faeries are below her station, she should clap sitting down. She ignores him. After the ballet, Tamani takes Laurel to a green, where everyone sits around to chat, eat and engage in revelries—which Tamani explains are essentially just hook-ups and orgies. Marriage—called 'handfasting'—only exists in Avalon to raise seedlings.

Tamani asks Laurel if she would like to ask him to dance, as he cannot ask her outright, and though annoyed by the continued social barrier between them, does ask him. They dance, and Tamani kisses her. She kisses him back for a moment before pushing him away, and he refuses to apologise, instead saying he loves her. He accuses Laurel of not wanting him in her human life and she demands he take her back home. At the gate, Shar tells them that they have a visitor: David. Tamani learns Laurel lied to David about where she was that day and exclaims he feels special. When Laurel becomes angry, he tells her to say she does not love him, and when she cannot, asks her to simply love him instead. David approaches them, at which point Tamani kisses Laurel again so David sees. Laurel, furious, yells at Tamani to leave. David, angry that Laurel lied, and suspicious of what exists between her and Tamani, says he doesn't want to see her for a while.

Back home, Laurel finds a note from Barnes saying he has kidnapped Chelsea. She begs David to come help her save Chelsea and he agrees, driving to the specified meeting point—a lighthouse—as Laurel mixes potions in the passenger seat. At the lighthouse, Barnes tells Laurel he will release Chelsea in return for Laurel taking him to the gate. Or, he will kill her, Chelsea and David. He is interrupted by the arrival of someone else; Klea. Barnes is shocked to see her, and she shoots him in the head, killing him. Laurel unties Chelsea, and Chelsea asks Laurel what's going on—and not to lie, because she already knows about her blossom, that Laurel is a faerie, and that trolls are hunting her. Klea assures David and Laurel that she will take care of the trolls (calling them 'specimens') and that it is just as well she ignored Laurel's refusal about having bodyguards, or she would not have known they were in danger. Laurel offers to make Chelsea forget about everything with a potion, but Chelsea says she prefers knowing.

After dropping Chelsea home, Laurel tells David she'll go to Tamani tomorrow and explain she cannot see him anymore, at all—she chooses David entirely. He kisses her and they reconcile. Laurel goes home and tells her parents everything that has happened, including telling them about the trolls, which she omitted six months ago, and reconciles with her mother. The next morning, Shar tells Laurel that Tamani has left for a new assignment already. He also makes clear how much he dislikes the way Laurel treats Tamani. Laurel tells him—after he demands she be honest—what happened with the trolls and Klea. After she leaves, Tamani steps out from where he was hidden. Shar asks if Tamani is ready for what he is about to do, and Tamani assures Shar that he is.

== Critical reception ==
Spells met with critical acclaim prior to its release. Booklist gave Spells a starred review and wrote, "Mixing a little bit of Harry Potter and a lot of Twilight ... Pike has hit on a winning combination. Yet it is her own graceful take on life inside Avalon that adds a shimmering patina sure to enthrall readers." Romantic Times awarded Spells a "Top Pick," noting that "[s]urprises and suspense abound, making Spells harder to put down than Wings. Laurel is blossoming into an intriguing woman. Her conflict of heart won't come as a surprise to others who have been torn between two things they love dearly." Salt Lake City Weekly found that "...Pike's tale is more than another derivative hero-quest narrative. While telling a fanciful story about faeries and trolls, she cleverly interweaves an effective teen coming-of-age yarn". Spells was endorsed via a cover blurb by Carrie Jones, who said, "Spells is brilliant and lovely. Aprilynne Pike's talent just continues to bloom and I am almost afraid to see how awesome her next book will be."
