= Destined =

Destined may refer to:

- Destiny
- Destined (Cast novel), 2011 novel in the House of Night series by P.C. Cast and Kristin Cast
- Destined (Pike novel), 2012 novel in the Wings series by Aprilynne Pike
- Destined (film), 2016 American fantasy drama film
- "Destined" (Ms. Marvel), a 2022 episode of the American television series Ms. Marvel
- Destined Records, a British independent record label
- "Destined", a song by Quavo from the album Qromelife, 2026

== See also ==
- Destiny (disambiguation)
