= Illusions (Pike novel) =

2011 novel by Aprilynne Pike

Illusions or Wild
- Author: Aprilynne Pike
- Cover artist: Mark Tucker
- Language: English
- Series: Wings
- Genre: Young adult, Fantasy, Romance
- Publisher: HarperTeen (US); HarperCollins (UK)
- Publication date: May 3, 2011
- Publication place: United States
- Media type: Print (Hardcover) e-Book; Audiobook
- Pages: 384
- ISBN: 0-06-166809-5
- Preceded by: Wings; Spells
- Followed by: Destined

Illusions (also released as Wild) is the third book in the New York Times best-selling Wings series by Aprilynne Pike. It follows Pike's #1 New York Times best-selling debut, Wings, which introduced readers to Laurel Sewell, a faerie sent among humans to guard the gateway to Avalon, and the direct sequel, Spells.

== Plot summary ==
Laurel is entering her senior year and is shocked to see Tamani for the first time in 8 months, posing as a new student—'Tam Collins'—who has just moved to Crescent City, California from Scotland. He has been training in Scotland to live among humans and stay close to Laurel, since she has been attacked by trolls several times. Aaron—another sentry—and Tamani explain that there have been signs of trolls, but they haven't actually found any, which is suspicious. What's worse, their tracking magic hasn't been working, either.

A few days later, Klea comes to Laurel's house and introduces Yuki, a Japanese exchange student who Laurel immediately realises is a faerie. Klea tells Laurel that Yuki's foster parents were killed by trolls and that Yuki is a 'dryad'. Tamani is suspicious and says they need to figure out why Klea wants Laurel watching Yuki—or, more likely, wants Yuki watching Laurel—and what kind of faerie Yuki is. They decide to speak to Jamison, and Tamani tries to call Shar. Laurel is shocked and jealous to see that Tamani and the other sentries all have iPhones. Aaron asks Tamani if he thinks Yuki is Unseelie, which he doesn't. Laurel and Tamani go to Avalon to speak with Jamison. Tamani is concerned that Shar isn't answering his phone, and admits to Laurel that he thinks of Shar as a brother; Shar was the one who trained him as a sentry. Shar is unharmed, he simply hates his phone, partly because touchscreens don't respond to faeries very well. Laurel has to pull rank to get the sentries to request to open the gate and it is opened by Yasmine. Shar asks Yasmine if he can use the gate to Hokkaido, Japan, supposedly to see if the faeries there know about Yuki.

Yasmine takes Laurel and Tamani to see Jamison in the Winter Palace, which seems to terrify Tamani. Laurel tells Jamison about Klea and Yuki, and Jamison asks what Klea looks like. He agrees figuring out Yuki's 'caste' is necessary, so they go to the academy. There, Katya suggests using phosphorescence serum—faeries glow when they drink it, but Summer faeries grow much brighter and longer. Back at the gate, Tamani asks Jamison for more sentries, to watch Yuki. Shar returns from Hokkaido but ignores Laurel when she asks who he met there. Tamani explains that Shar's mother is Unseelie; exiled from Avalon because she disagreed with the isolationist policy of the 'Seelie' Avalon faeries. There is a 'detention camp' in Hokkaido, but the faeries there are sterilised, and there is no way Yuki could have escaped. Laurel attempts to befriend Yuki at school, but fails, so Tamani suggests he give it a try, as he is also a new student. He walks Yuki home and they hit it off, during which Tamani notices Yuki has only one dimple; faeries are usually perfectly symmetrical. Later, Tamani gives Laurel a ride to school and David's irritation frustrates Laurel. She vents to her mother, who says that loving someone is a choice that needs to be remade each day. Laurel invites Tamani over to help with research, but she can't quite figure out what she wants, and explains that she normally dissects and tastes plants she works with. Realising what she's just said, Laurel tries to protest, but Tamani kisses her. Though angry, she is mostly confused at the information that jumps to mind, which hasn't happened when he's kissed her before, and Tamani sheepishly admits he bit his tongue before kissing her; she tasted his sap. What concerns Laurel more is that the information was how to make potions from faeries.

Tamani is becoming good friends with Yuki and has taken to wearing fingerless gloves to hide his pollen, now that Laurel is blossoming. He is telling Aaron that Yuki's behaviour at home is very normal when they hear two trolls coming—the first they've sighted in months. Tamani kills one, but the other vanishes before Aaron's eyes. Tamani is suspicious of how the trolls were unarmed and seemed surprised to see faeries. David prompts Laurel to invite him to the Sadie Hawkins dance on Halloween. Yuki asks Tamani and Chelsea asks Ryan, and the six of them attend together, with Laurel hoping to befriend Yuki in the process. In a similar effort, she and Chelsea take Yuki out for smoothies, which goes well despite some awkwardness. Chelsea tells Laurel that David isn't jealous because Tamani likes Laurel, but because Laurel is jealous of how everyone, particularly Yuki, is fawning over Tamani.

Before the dance, Tamani updates Laurel, David and Chelsea about the trolls and says they need to get some of Yuki's hair or sap to test its phosphorescence. Chelsea excitedly quizzes Tamani about which stories have faerie roots and asks about Camelot. Tamani explains that Guinevere was a faerie and married Arthur to seal a human-fae alliance, with Lancelot as her fear-gleidhidh—the same position Tamani occupies in relation to Laurel. David remarks that Arthur and Guinevere might have had a chance to make things work if Lancelot hadn't been there. Laurel enjoys the dance, but is uncomfortable when she sees Tamani dancing so closely with Yuki. She tries to leave early with David but Tamani refuses to let Laurel leave without him. On the drive home, a troll is thrown in front of Tamani's car and he crashes into it, killing it. Yuki and Ryan are both injured and Tamani fights off two other trolls, but not before they demand 'the girl'. Just as Tamani tells Laurel to take everyone to her house, Laurel is overcome with an agonising pain in her head and she blacks out. At Laurel's house, Tamani tells Chelsea to take Ryan home and to say they hit a deer. Klea arrives—called by Yuki—and Tamani notes that Yuki seems afraid of her. After she leaves, David reveals that the sap from Yuki's cut can be used in Laurel's phosphorescence experiment. In the forest, Aaron and Tamani argue about Tamani letting the trolls get away, but Tamani insists his job is to protect Laurel, so he needed to stay with her.

At school, Chelsea tells Laurel that Ryan doesn't remember much of the dance or the crash, and suspects someone gave him a memory elixir. Tamani 'accidentally' bumps into David in the hallway, angry at how everything seems to be going wrong. He ditches class with Yuki and they go to a park to chat. He asks Yuki to tell him if she ever gets into trouble with Klea, and he believes Yuki when she says she will. Laurel confronts Tamani about Ryan, but he insists it wasn't him and that if it was a sentry, they were violating orders. He asks about her experiment, and Laurel says she doubts Yuki is a Summer faerie.

As Tamani chats with Yuki at school, David 'accidentally' bumps into him, and Tamani sees Laurel glaring at David. Against his better judgement, Tamani confronts David and demands to know what his problem is. Against David's better judgement, he rises to Tamani's bait, and they shove each other around until David punches Tamani in the jaw and they fight. Other students—including Laurel and Chelsea—see the fight, and Laurel intervenes, yelling at them both and breaking up with David. Upset, she ditches her classes and drives up to the cabin near the gate. Tamani follows her and she berates him for fighting David and demands to know what's going on with Yuki. Tamani says that when he danced with Yuki, he pretended Yuki was Laurel. Laurel kisses him, pulling him into the cabin. They spend the afternoon there, chatting and kissing. When Laurel gets home, she tells her mother about the fight. She calls Chelsea, who is stunned that Laurel broke up with David, and Laurel says she doesn't regret it. Chelsea asks if that means Laurel is dating Tamani, and Laurel says she isn't sure. The next day, Laurel tells Tamani that they're not automatically together just because she broke up with David. Shar—posing as Tamani's uncle—comes to the school, called because of David and Tamani's fight. Because of Tamani's terrible grades, his punishment is 3 days' suspension with David, a straight-A student, tutoring him. During this time, Tamani explains to David how unlikely it is that he and Laurel would've lasted anyway, given how much longer faeries live than humans, and that as her fear-gleidhidh, Tamani has to follow Laurel whenever she isn't in Avalon, so David would never be 'free' of him. David apologises to Laurel and they agree to be friends.

Tamani has been hunting for trolls at night and Shar scolds him for not sleeping until they notice two trolls which inexplicably vanish. When Tamani walks towards a drop of blood on the ground, he finds himself being turned away from it. Shar throws him at it, but Tamani bounces off. Using salt, they uncover a section of woods and a cabin that have been hidden using a blue powder created by a very powerful Fall faerie—far more powerful than one as young as Yuki could be. Tamani collects some of the powder for Laurel to analyse, but is so exhausted that he passes out as soon as he steps into her house. Laurel invites Tamani to spend Thanksgiving at her house. Tamani gets along well with her parents and asks Laurel when she will come back to Avalon. Laurel admits she's conflicted, liking both the academy and the prospect of human university; mirroring how she cares about both David and Tamani. Tamani makes clear he doesn't expect Laurel to make her decision him right away, and she kisses him. Chelsea arrives and quizzes Tamani again as Laurel continues to try and identify what's in the blue powder; she can't figure out the main ingredient. Tamani leaves to go to Yuki's house and hears her on the phone, saying that she has been trying to do something and that she knows 'the old man' can do it, but she can't yet. Yuki asks Tamani if she is his girlfriend, then kisses him.

The winter formal is approaching, and the six once again go as a group, with David and Laurel going as friends. Laurel realises that the main ingredient in the blue powder was a faerie blossom, but it can't have been Yuki's. Tamani realises that Klea must be a Fall faerie, and she's been working with the trolls, including Barnes. At school, Laurel gets another painful headache and sees Yuki watching her, and begins to wonder if Yuki is the cause. Chelsea confesses she is breaking up with Ryan, having realised she'd only been happy dating him because David had been happy with Laurel. At the dance, Yuki tells Tamani that Klea hadn't wanted her to come, but she insisted. She adds that she is supposed to leave tomorrow and she isn't supposed to come back.

Tamani's phone rings and he excuses himself to answer it. Shar and the other sentries raided the cabin that was hidden by the blue powder, and Tamani is annoyed that they did it without him. Shar tells him that the cabin was empty, save for two dead trolls; the two trolls that Aaron and Tamani saw a month earlier. Irritated, Tamani tries to hang up, but has to remove his glove to work the touchscreen. He tells Laurel and the others about the cabin, and Laurel notices he has pollen on his hands. This means Yuki is a Winter faerie, and she has known Laurel and Tamani are faeries all along. Tamani tells Laurel to call Shar, then asks Yuki to come back to his home, since it is her last night before she leaves. She agrees. Shar and the sentries, as well as David and Chelsea, arrive before Tamani and Yuki. Tamani tricks Yuki into walking into a circle of salt—extremely dangerous and forbidden magic—which traps her and her power, and David ties her to a chair. Chelsea unties the knot at Yuki's back to reveal a Winter blossom, and Tamani silently prays for help.

== Characters ==
Laurel is a Fall faerie who was chosen to live in the human world when she was young, so she could inherit the land that contains a gate to Avalon. She struggles to choose between her human life and her life in Avalon, just as she struggles with feelings for both David and Tamani.

Tamani is a Spring faerie and the sentry in charge of guarding Laurel. They were friends as children, before Laurel had her mind erased and was sent to live amongst humans, and Tamani has been in love with her ever since. He pretends to be a transfer student from Scotland so as to guard Laurel at school.

David is Laurel's human best friend and later boyfriend. He was the person Laurel first confided in when she discovered she was a faerie. When he gets into a fight with Tamani at school, Laurel breaks up with him, but they remain friends.

Chelsea is one of Laurel's best friends. She discovered Laurel was a faerie in Spells when she was kidnapped by trolls and has a huge crush on David.

Yuki is a faerie under the guardianship of Klea. It is revealed at the end of the book that she is a Winter faerie (the most powerful kind) and has known all along that Laurel and Tamani are also faeries. She has a crush on Tamani.

Klea is a faerie woman who pretended to be a human who hunted supernatural creatures. In actuality she is working with the trolls and Yuki is helping her.

Shar is another Spring faerie, the sentry in charge of guarding the gate to Avalon. He pretends to be Tamani's uncle when Tamani is undercover at school. His loyalty is not to Seelie or Unseelie faeries, but his companion, Ariana, and his seedling, Lenore.

== Critical reception ==
Like prior books in the series, Illusions met with positive reviews prior to release. Lisa McMann provided a cover blurb, asking, "Who knew faeries could be this cool? Illusions has it all. It's fascinating, rich, and romantic, and weaves a great new tapestry of thrilling fantasy." Booklist wrote, "The Wings [series] continues with a twist. A dramatic conclusion will leave readers anxious for the next installment." Raven Haller of the Romantic Times said, "Pike has taken her already acclaimed series and turned the story up a notch. It's full of plot twists and character development that keep the pages flying. You'll love seeing Pike explore and develop her faerie world and its politics. I can hardly wait for the next book!"
