= Flower Fairies =

Illustrations by Cicely Mary Barker

Flower Fairies are illustrations by Cicely Mary Barker, created during the first half of the 20th century.

== Creator of the Flower Fairies ==
Flower Fairies are the product of English illustrator Cicely Mary Barker. Unable to go to school as a child because of her epilepsy, she was home-schooled and spent much of her time drawing and painting. Her artwork was influenced by illustrator Kate Greenaway and even more so by the Pre-Raphaelite Brotherhood, and she developed her talent as a member of the Croydon Art Society. Her flower fairy paintings, in particular, were driven by the Victorian popularity of fairies and fairy stories.

Cicely Mary Barker published her first Flower Fairies book in 1923. She received £25 for Flower Fairies of the Spring, a collection of twenty-four paintings and illustrations. The books enjoyed huge popularity due to Queen Mary's well-known interest in fairy art. She later published seven more volumes of Flower Fairies. Following the publication of Cicely Mary Barker's original Flower Fairy paintings and verses, two series of fairy stories featuring original Flower Fairies characters, Flower Fairies Friends and, more recently, Secret Stories, have also been published. The Flower Fairies were Cicely Mary Barker's most well-known creations. They are notable in particular because of the sweet, realistic depiction of the children, modelled on children enrolled in her sister Dorothy's kindergarten. She has also been likened to Beatrix Potter in the botanical accuracy of the plants and flowers amidst which the fairies dwell. The Flower Fairies and all related publications are licensed properties of Frederick Warne & Co and the Estate of Cicely Mary Barker.

== Flower Fairies books ==
=== Original books ===
Below are the eight original Flower Fairies books and the dates they were published by Cicely Mary Barker's original publisher, Blackie.

- Flower Fairies of the Spring (1923)
- Flower Fairies of the Summer (1925)
- Flower Fairies of the Autumn (1926)
- A Flower Fairy Alphabet (1934)
- Flower Fairies of the Trees (1940)
- Flower Fairies of the Garden (1944)
- Flower Fairies of the Wayside (1948)
- Flower Fairies of the Winter (1985)

Though first published in the first half of the century, Cicely Mary Barker's original eight volumes were re-launched in 2002 with slightly contemporary jackets, while maintaining their classic artwork.

In addition, Frederick Warne & Co has published the following compilations of Cicely Mary Barker's Flower Fairy artwork and poetry.

=== Complete compilations ===
- Flower Fairies Library - The Poems That Inspired Fairyopolis (8 Volume Boxed Set) (1990) 7 5/8 x 6 1/4 in.
- Flower Fairies Library (8 volume box set) (1999) Pub: Warne & Ted Smart. 20 x 6 cm / 7.9x 6.3 in.
- The Complete Book of the Flower Fairies (1 volume) (1996/2019) 10.25 x 8.13 x 0.71 in.
- The Complete Flower Fairies (8 Volume Boxed Set) (2020) Pub: The Folio Society with Ware. 5¾ x 4¼ in.

=== Select compilations and other books ===
- Flower Fairies: The Meaning of Flowers (1996)
- Cicely Mary Barker and Her Art (1995)
- A Treasury of the Flower Fairies (1997) (128 pages) selection of illustrations from the eight original Flower Fairies books.

== Flower Fairies today ==
Frederick Warne & Co. have published two other series of fairy stories based on Cicely Mary Barker's original characters and incorporating her original artwork.

=== Flower Fairies Friends ===
Flower Fairies Friends are books for younger readers, each telling the story of a particular fairy and her friends, and were first published in 2003.

=== Flower Fairies Secret Stories ===
Secret Stories is a new departure for the Flower Fairies. Introduced in 2006, they feature the characters of the Flower Fairies Friends books in chapter book length stories for 6-10 year olds.

=== Flower Fairies gift books ===
A new range of gift books was launched in 2005 with Flower Fairies Journal (Fairyopolis) and continue with How to Find Flower Fairies (2007), featuring ephemera such as postcards, mini-books and letters plus tabs, lenticulars and pop-ups. They explore the worlds of the author Cicely Mary Barker and the Flower Fairies in exquisite detail. A sequel to Fairyopolis has been released, entitled Return to Fairyopolis.

=== Flower Fairies merchandise ===
The Flower Fairies are highly successful internationally and are sold in more than 35 countries around the world. Flower Fairies merchandise includes items such as giftware, toiletries, cross stitch and stationery.

== See also ==
Clara Ingram Judson, writer who created her own Flower Fairies title, illustrated by Maginel Wright Enright, circa 1915.
