= Wings (Pike novel) =

2009 novel by Aprilynne Pike

wings
- U.S. cover of Wings
- Author: Aprilynne Pike
- Original title: Autumn Wings
- Cover artist: Ray Shappell
- Language: English
- Series: Wings
- Genre: Young adult, Fantasy, Romance
- Publisher: HarperTeen (US); HarperCollins (UK)
- Publication date: May 5, 2009
- Publication place: United States
- Media type: Print (hardcover, paperback) e-Book; Audiobook
- Pages: 290 (US hardcover); 320 (US paperback); 356 (UK paperback)
- ISBN: 0-06-166803-6
- Followed by: Spells; Illusions; Destined

Wings is the debut, young-adult faerie novel by author Aprilynne Pike. It is the first of four books about a fifteen-year-old girl who discovers she is a faerie sent among humans to guard the gateway to Avalon.

Wings was released in the US, UK, and Canada on May 5, 2009, and became a New York Times best seller in its first week of sales, reaching #1 on the Children's Chapter Books list in its second week. It was also a Publishers Weekly Bestseller and made Pike the best-selling non-celebrity children's author to debut in 2009. Wings went on to become an international bestseller in 2010.

The sequel to Wings, Spells, was released on May 4, 2010. The third book in the series, Illusions, was released May 3, 2011. The fourth book in the series, Destined, was released on May 1, 2012. The last book in the series, Arabesque, taking place 10 years after the events of Destined, was released on November 22, 2016.

== Plot ==
Laurel Sewell is a 15-year-old girl who has lived her whole life on her family's land near Orick, California. Her adoptive parents buy a bookstore in Crescent City, California and move the family there, deciding to enroll Laurel in Del Norte High School—up to this point, she has been homeschooled. At high school, Laurel finds she struggles to concentrate with the harsh lighting and confining classrooms but quickly befriends David, a handsome boy in her year, and Chelsea, a friendly girl with a crush on David who is fascinated by Laurel's strictly-vegan diet. As Laurel and David grow closer, she tells him that she wasn't adopted by normal means; she was left in a basket on her parents' doorstep when she was 3, with no memories except her name.

A few months into the year, Laurel gets a large pimple on her back, which is unusual as she never gets pimples. She attempts to use an herbal salve of her mother's to treat it, but the zit only grows larger, until one day she wakes up with an enormous blue flower growing out of the small of her back. Hesitant to tell her parents, Laurel confides in David, who is surprised but also remarks that the blossom resembles a pair of wings. Using David's microscope, they confirm that the blossom is a plant.

Meanwhile, Laurel's parents are visited by Jeremiah Barnes, who is interested in buying their small plot of land near Orick, which they are selling to pay for the bookstore. Barnes is particularly interested if Laurel's parents have ever had trespassers on the property. Laurel and her parents travel to visit their old house on the property and Laurel meets a young man called Tamani. She finds him intriguing and handsome but is wary of how unsurprised he is by the flower on her back. He offers answers, however, and explains that she—like him—is a faerie; a highly-evolved, sentient plant.

Laurel, angered, leaves and threatens to call the police if she finds Tamani trespassing again, later finding some strange glitter on her arm where he touched her. She tries to avoid David, but eventually tells him about Tamani and what he said, storming off when David says it makes sense. She asks her father if she has ever been to a doctor, and he says once; when she was found. Apparently, the doctor couldn't hear her heartbeat. David convinces Laurel to consider Tamani's theory and suggests testing to see if she really is a plant. They find that her blood is clear, and David can't hear her heartbeat. He suspects she doesn't even have a heart. Laurel is shaken by this, and David kisses her in an attempt to comfort her. She is flattered but says it's too much to deal with right now. They also figure out that Laurel exhales oxygen and inhales carbon dioxide.

David invites Laurel to a school dance and suggests her 'costume' be a faerie. She goes to the dance with him and is stunned when another student hands her one of her petals that apparently fell off, and she realises her blossom must be wilting. The next morning, all the petals have fallen out, and she goes to find Tamani for more answers. He tells her that she is a Fall faerie. This means she has an innate sense of plants and magic, and can create elixirs and potions. Tamani is a Spring faerie, the commonest and least-powerful kind, so can entice other faeries or animals (including humans). The glitter she found on her arm was his pollen—faeries reproduce through pollination, like any other plant.

Tamani is on the land because he is a sentry—one of several—guarding something extremely powerful, as well as watching over Laurel because she is a scion, a faerie sent to live among humans so she can inherit her parents' land. When Laurel tells Tamani that her parents are selling it, he insists she has to find a way to stop them.

Meanwhile, Laurel's father, Mark, becomes very ill. He doesn't improve, with the doctors eventually giving him a week to live. Barnes arrives with a higher offer for the property and more paperwork to sign. Laurel's mother agrees to the offer, as she needs to pay Mark's medical bills. David and Laurel drive out to Barnes' office because Laurel is convinced he's hiding something, and they find a hideous creature chained inside. Barnes discovers them and punches David before ordering two lackeys to throw David and Laurel in a river to drown.

Laurel and David manage to breathe underwater by sealing their mouths together, as Laurel exhales oxygen and inhales carbon dioxide. They free themselves and go back to David's car. Realising that this is bigger than some real estate plot, Laurel tells David they need Tamani. After finding him, Tamani explains that Barnes and his lackeys are trolls—primates, like humans—and that they want the land because it contains a gate to Avalon. Tamani suspects that Barnes poisoned Laurel's dad to force them into selling, and that Barnes definitely doesn't know Laurel is a faerie, or he wouldn't have tried to drown her. David and Laurel drive Tamani to Barnes' office. Tamani sneaks in and kills the other trolls by snapping their necks, but Barnes discovers him and shoots him in the leg. Whilst he's distracted, Laurel picks up his gun and threatens to shoot him. Barnes realises she is a scion and Laurel shoots him in the shoulder. She drops the gun in surprise, and Tamani grabs it, but Barnes jumps out a window before Tamani can shoot him.

Returning to the property, the other sentries take Tamani to Avalon to heal him. A Winter faerie, Jamison, is informed about the trolls and tells Laurel to be on her guard. He also gives her an elixir that will heal her father and a diamond so her parents don't have to sell the property to pay their bills. Laurel gives her father the elixir and tells her parents that she is a faerie. She and David share a kiss, and a few weeks later she sees Tamani, healed and back on sentry duty. He suggests she stay in the house on the property, but Laurel declines, saying she has to protect her friends and family.

== Critical reception ==
Wings debuted to positive reviews overall, with comparisons to the Twilight Saga by Stephenie Meyer. Meyer endorsed Pike's work via a cover blurb, which reads, "Aprilynne Pike's Wings is a remarkable debut; the ingenuity of the mythology is matched only by the startling loveliness with which the story unfolds." Booklist wrote, "This first novel is clearly designed to attract the Twilight set, though there's significantly less edge (and blood). There is, however, a familiar triangle. ... Fine escapist fare, this neatly mixes the everyday with the otherworldly." Romantic Times awarded Wings a "Top Pick", calling it "an enthralling story of danger and love. This re-interpretation of the faerie story is one that will captivate readers with its plausibility and imagination."

=== Accolades ===
- An IndieBound Spring 2009 Indie Next List pick.
- An American Library Association "Best Books for Young Adults" nominee.
- A Romantic Times "Best Young Adult Paranormal/Fantasy Novel" nominee.
- A Cybils Awards Fantasy/Science Fiction nominee.
- A Whitney Awards "Best Speculative Fiction" finalist.

== Translations ==
Wings will be published in 29 languages by 34 publishers around the world.
