= Cicely Mary Barker =

British artist

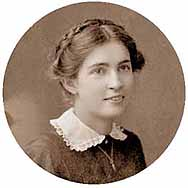
- Barker in her teens
- Born: Cicely Mary Barker; 28 June 1895; Croydon, Surrey, England
- Died: 16 February 1973 (aged 77); Worthing Hospital, Worthing, England
- Resting place: Ashes spread in the churchyard at Storrington, Sussex, England
- Education: Correspondence art courses Croydon School of Art
- Occupations: Author, illustrator, artist
- Years active: 1911–1962
- Employers: Various publishers but chiefly Blackie and Son Limited; Commissions from various British dioceses
- Known for: Illustrations of fairies and flowers Triptychs and other works for the Anglican church
- Notable work: The Flower Fairies of the Spring (1923) and other Flower Fairy books The Feeding of the Five Thousand; The Parable of the Great Supper; Out of Great Tribulation and other Christian-themed works in various British churches and chapels
- Parent(s): Walter Barker and Mary Eleanor (Oswald) Barker
- Relatives: Dorothy Oswald Barker (sister)

Cicely Mary Barker (28 June 1895 – 16 February 1973) was an English illustrator who created the Flower Fairies, images of ethereal smiling children with butterfly wings. As a child, she was greatly influenced by the works of the illustrator Kate Greenaway, whom she assiduously copied in her formative years. Her principal influence, however, which she duly credited, was the art of the Pre-Raphaelite Brotherhood.

== Early life ==
Cicely Mary Barker was born in 1895 in Croydon, England. She suffered from epilepsy as a child and remained physically delicate for most of her life. She was unable to go to school, so she was educated at home and spent much of her time on her own, reading and drawing.

In 1908, when Cicely was 13, her father enrolled her at the Croydon Art Society, where they both exhibited work. She also enrolled in a Correspondence Art course which she continued until 1918. At 16, Cicely was elected a life member of Croydon Art Society, the youngest person ever to receive this honour. The art critic for the Croydon Advertiser commented: "Her drawings show a remarkable freedom of spirit. She has distinct promise."

In 1911, when she was 15 her father submitted some of her work to Raphael Tuck, the stationery printer, who bought four of her pictures for greeting cards. From this time onwards, she was able to sell her work to magazines, to postcard and greeting card manufacturers, and later to book publishers. This was very helpful to the family finances for her father died when she was 17, leaving Cicely, her elder sister and her mother in difficult circumstances.

Cicely was industrious and determined. She sent her flower fairy paintings to several publishers before Blackie accepted them for publication in 1923. She was paid only £25 for a total of twenty-four illustrations and verses in Flower Fairies of the Spring, the first of the Flower Fairy series. Seven more little books about Fairies were to follow.

== Fairy art ==
Cicely was also influenced by the huge popular interest in fairies which developed from the Victorian enthusiasm for fairy stories and was epitomised by the immense popularity of J. M. Barrie's Peter Pan in the early part of the 20th century. Published in 1923, Flower Fairies of the Spring was well received by a post-industrial, war-weary public who were charmed by her vision of hope and innocence, which seemed to evoke a less aggressively modern world.

Queen Mary did much to encourage the vogue for fairy paintings during the 1920s by frequently sending postcards depicting fairies to her friends. This popularity saw the publication of Cicely Mary Barker's Elves and Fairies postcards in 1918.

Barker always used real-life models for her paintings. Most of the models came from the kindergarten her sister Dorothy ran in the back room of the house in which they lived. She also painted the children and relatives. One of her models was Gladys Tidy, the young girl who came to the house every Saturday to do the household work.

Barker always asked the child model to hold the flower, twig or blossom of a particular fairy, for she wanted to be sure of the accuracy of her depiction of the shape, texture and form of the plant. Her only alteration was to the size, she enlarged the flower to make it the same size as the child.

Her flowers are always botanically accurate. If she could not find a flower close at hand, she enlisted the help of staff at Kew Gardens, who would often visit with specimens for her to paint. She wrote in the foreword to Flower Fairies of the Wayside:

So let me say quite plainly, that I have drawn all the plants and flowers very carefully, from real ones; and everything that I have said about them is as true as I could make it. But I have never seen a fairy; the fairies and all about them are just "pretend".

== Christian art ==
Barker's art reflects several strong influences. Her family was deeply religious and she retained a strong Christian faith all her life. She greatly admired the work of the Pre-Raphaelites and her own work echoes their philosophy of being true to nature both in her meticulous depiction of flowers and plants and in the way in which the fairies represent their spirit.

Canon Ingram Hill remembers her as "one of the pillars" of St Andrew's Church, Croydon. Her faith informed all of her work, religious or secular, whether in cards, children's books or decorating the churches with which she was affiliated.

In 1916, Barker designed eight mission postcards, including Prayer, a picture of a young woman kneeling before an open window, possibly modelled on her sister. In 1923, she painted a series of five birthday cards featuring angels and babies for The Society for Promoting Christian Knowledge.

Starting in 1920, Barker painted many religious works, including illustrated Bible stories, written with her sister Dorothy. She also painted panels and triptych for chapels and churches including The Feeding of the Five Thousand for the chapel at Penarth and The Parable of the Great Supper for the chapel of St. George's Waddon.

In 1926, Queen Mary purchased one of her religious paintings, entitled The Darling of the World Has Come.

== Bibliography ==
Parker's publications include:

- Flower Fairies of the Spring; London, Blackie, 1923, Frederick Warne, 1990.
- Spring Songs with Music; London, Blackie, 1923.
- Flower Fairies of the Summer; London, Blackie, 1925; Frederick Warne, 1985.
- Westcott, M. K., Child Thoughts in Picture and Verse; London, Blackie, 1925.
- Flower Fairies of the Autumn; London, Blackie, 1926; Frederick Warne, 1990.
- Summer Songs with Music; London, Blackie, 1926.
- The Book of the Flower Fairies; London, Blackie, 1927.
- Autumn Songs with Music; London, Blackie, 1927.
- Old Rhymes for All Times; London, Blackie, 1928.
- The Children’s Book of Hymns; London, Blackie, 1929.
- Barker, Dorothy, Our Darling's First Book; London, Blackie, 1929.
- Beautiful Bible Pictures; 1932.
- The Little Picture Hymn Book; London, Blackie, 1933.
- Rhymes New and Old; London, Blackie, 1933.
- A Flower Fairy Alphabet; London, Blackie, 1934.
- A Little Book of Old Rhymes; London, Blackie, 1936.
- Barker, Dorothy, He Leadeth Me; London, Blackie, 1936.
- A Little Book of Rhymes New and Old; London, Blackie, 1937.
- The Lord of the Rushie River; London, Blackie, 1938, Frederick Warne, 1990.
- Flower Fairies of the Trees; London, Blackie, 1940, Frederick Warne, 1990.
- When Spring Came in at the Window; London, Blackie, 1942.
- Stevenson, Robert Louis, A Child’s Garden of Verses; London, Blackie, 1944.
- Flower Fairies of the Garden; London, Blackie, 1944, Frederick Warne, 1990.
- Groundsel and Necklaces; London, Blackie, 1946, published as Fairy Necklaces, Frederick Warne, 1991.
- Flower Fairies of the Wayside; London, Blackie, 1948, Frederick Warne, 1990.
- Flower Fairies of the Flowers and Trees; London, Blackie, 1950.
- Lively Stories; Macmillan, 1954.
- The Flower Fairy Picture Book; London, Blackie, 1955.
- Lively Numbers; Macmillan, 1957.
- Lively Words; Macmillan, 1961.
- The Sand, the Sea and the Sun; Gibson, 1970.
- Flower Fairies of the Winter; London, Blackie, 1985, Frederick Warne, 1990.
- Simon the Swan; London, Blackie, 1988, Frederick Warne, 1990.
- Flower Fairies of the Seasons; Bedrick/Blackie, 1988.
- A Little Book of Prayers and Hymns; London, Frederick Warne, 1994.
- A Flower Fairies Treasury; London, Frederick Warne, 1997.

== See also ==
Clara Ingram Judson, a writer who created her own Flower Fairies title
