= Aprilynne Pike =

American novelist

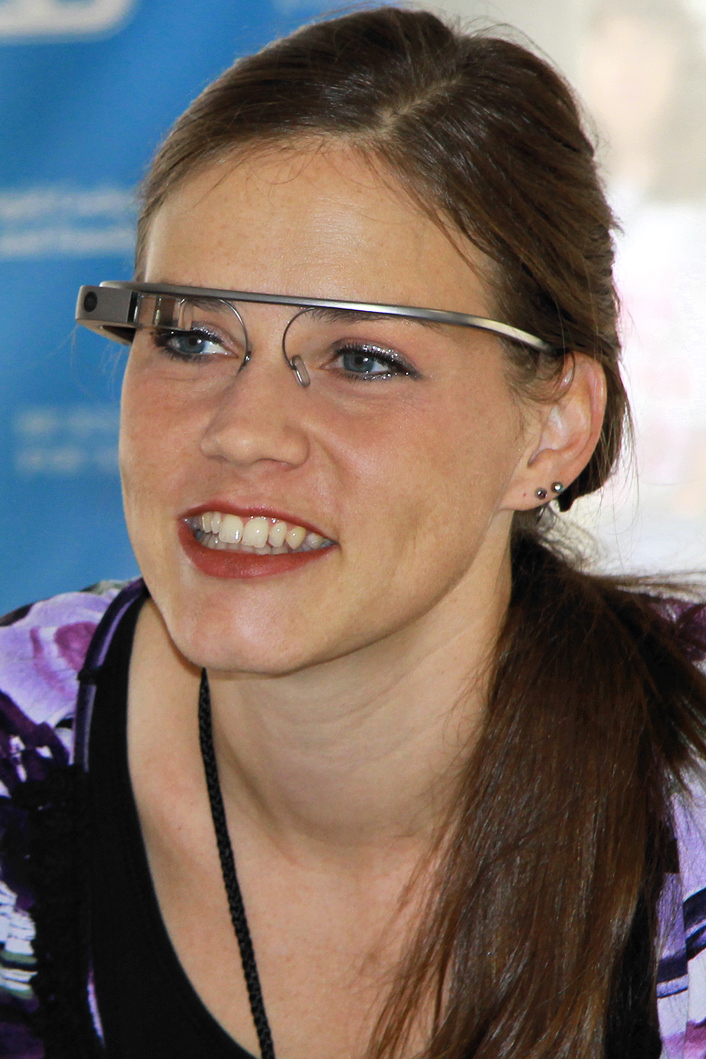
- Pike at the 2013 Texas Book Festival.
- Born: 1980 (age 45–46); Salt Lake City, Utah, U.S.
- Education: Lewis–Clark State College (BA)
- Occupation: Novelist
- Writing career
- Genres: Young adult fiction, fantasy fiction
- Website: aprilynnepike.com

Aprilynne Pike (born 1980) is an internationally best-selling American author best known for her debut novel Wings, which was released in English on May 5, 2009.

== Biography ==
Aprilynne Pike was born in Salt Lake City, Utah, and grew up in Phoenix, Arizona. She enjoyed creative writing even as a young child. She received a scholarship to Lewis-Clark State College in Lewiston, Idaho, and earned her B.A. in creative writing at the age of 20. Aprilynne and her husband, Kenneth, have four children. She currently lives in Arizona. In addition to writing, she has worked as an editor, a waitress, and childbirth educator and doula.

Pike tried to get published for several years without success. Her first book to be published was Wings (2009) which became a New York Times best-seller. This book became part of a five-book series written by Pike. Wings debuted as a New York Times best-seller and reached the #1 spot on the Children's Best Seller list, making Pike the best-selling non-celebrity children's author to debut in 2009. Her second novel likewise debuted on the New York Times Best Seller list. When her debut series reached three books and was moved to the New York Times best-selling Children's Series list, it became a best-selling series. Illusions and Destined also debuted on the USA Today Bestseller list, which combines books across all genres.

Pike cites several authors as influential in her writing, including young adult authors Stephenie Meyer—who promoted Pike's debut via cover blurb—and Lois Lowry.

== Publications ==
=== Books ===
Wings Series

1. Wings (2009)
2. Spells (2010)
3. Illusions/Wild (2011)
4. Destined (2012)
5. Arabesque (2016)

Earthbound Series

1. Earthbound (2013) ISBN 978-1595146526
2. Earthquake (2014)
3. Earthrise (2015)

Charlotte Westing Chronicles

1. Sleep No More (2014)
2. Sleep of Death (2014) ISBN 9781941855003

The Kingdom of Versailles

1. Glitter (2016)
2. Shatter (2018) ISBN 978-1101933749

Standalone works

- Life After Theft (2013)

Short stories

- "Nature" in Defy the Dark (2013) ISBN 978-0062123541

Novellas

- One Day More: A Life After Theft Novella (2013)

=== Essays ===
- "Now and Then" in Dear Bully: 70 Authors Tell Their Stories, HarperTeen (2011) ISBN 978-0-06-206097-6
