= Destined (Pike novel) =

2012 novel by Aprilynne Pike

- First edition
- Author: Aprilynne Pike
- Language: English
- Series: The Wings Series
- Genre: Young adult, Fantasy, Romance
- Publisher: HarperTeen (US); HarperCollins (UK)
- Publication date: May 1, 2012
- Publication place: United States
- Media type: Print (Hardcover, Paperback) e-Book; Audiobook
- ISBN: 0061668125
- Preceded by: Wings; Spells; Illusions

Destined is a 2012 young-adult fantasy romance novel by Aprilynne Pike. It's the fourth and final part of a series, being preceded by the novels Wings, Spells and Illusions. It debuted at #115 on the USA Today Bestseller list.

== Plot ==
The book picks up immediately where the last book, Illusions, left off; Tamani, Shar and Chelsea are standing around Yuki, who is imprisoned in a circle of salt. Yuki tells Tamani that she had wanted to come clean to him, she would have given up everything for him, and that they are alike; used by people who don't truly love them (Laurel and Klea). Laurel arrives and asks Yuki what Klea wants from her. Yuki tells her that Klea already has what she wanted and—in an effort to get Laurel to free her—reveals that Shar poisoned Laurel's mother so she couldn't have children; so Laurel's parents would be willing to take in a baby they found on their doorstep. Tamani swears to Laurel that he didn't know, and insists that Shar isn't a monster, but he will do whatever needs to be done to protect Avalon and his family.

Laurel goes home and Chelsea stays to watch Yuki with Tamani and Shar. Yuki gets under Chelsea's skin by saying she will always be second to Laurel in David's eyes, and Tamani comforts her. The next morning, Laurel returns to Tamani's and Chelsea goes home. She wants to tell Jamison about Yuki, but Shar points out that it would require opening the gate, possibly revealing its location to Klea. Additionally, Queen Marion may order Yuki to be executed—or worse. A troll breaks into the apartment, followed by Klea, whom Shar calls 'Callista'. She shoots him in the shoulder and he orders Tamani to get Laurel away as Yuki breaks free of the circle. As they flee from trolls, Tamani says that Klea/Callista is the exiled Fall faerie that Katya told Laurel about. Back home, Tamani tells Silve—another sentry—that Shar needs back up. Laurel catches her parents up and David comes over. Tamani receives a text from Shar, saying Klea took Yuki and he followed them. He sends two pictures, one showing a field of faerie sprouts. Shar then calls Tamani, who listens as Shar confronts Kleas. Klea explains stole a seed from the Unseelie fae, faked her death by cutting off her blossom, and used cloning to eventually get a Winter faerie sprout. She also made serums to immunise trolls against faerie magic, and reveals that Yuki pulled the location of the gate out of Laurel's mind—which was why Laurel kept getting headaches. Shar tells Tamani to tell his family he loves them, and Klea kills him. Tamani realises that these weren't just last words, but an order: to go to Avalon. Chelsea and David insist on coming to the gate with Tamani and Laurel. Jamison opens the gate and allows Chelsea and David to enter Avalon. He asks how Tamani trapped Yuki, but talks over Tamani when he tries to explain about the salt circle, as Queen Marion arrives. She orders Chelsea and David to be thrown out. Jamison warns that Klea will be arriving with potentially thousands of magic-immune trolls and that they need all the help they can get. They argue, and Marion refuses to believe Klea poses a real threat.

Jamison takes the Tamani and the others to the Winter Palace, and asks David what he knows about King Arthur. He shows them Excalibur and explains that it cannot touch faeries, and faeries cannot touch it; it must be wielded by a human. David removes Excalibur from the stone. Jamison orders Yasmine to stay with Marion, where she will be safe, and the trolls arrive, armed with guns. He tells David to defend the gate, and that so long as he's holding Excalibur, he can't be harmed. Worried that she might never get another chance to, Chelsea kisses David. Tamani and the sentries fight alongside David at the gate, and suddenly there seem to be no more trolls coming through. Instead, canisters of sleeping gas are thrown through. Laurel, David, Tamani and Chelsea avoid it by using each other to breathe, since faeries exhale oxygen and inhale carbon dioxide. Jamison and several other faeries are knocked unconscious. Tamani sends Chelsea to the Academy so she can tell the faeries there what's happening, whilst he, David and Laurel take Jamison to Tamani's mother, Rhoslyn. There, she helps Laurel try to wake Jamison up as David and Tamani help fight the trolls that have gotten past the gate. David saves Tamani's life after a troll injures Tamani's shoulder. Jamison hasn't yet woken up, so they will need to go to the Academy. They walk through Summer Square, which has an illusion on it to confuse the trolls into attacking each other. As they walk, Laurel finds Tamani's niece, Rowen, in the arms of her dead mother, Tamani's sister.

The illusion is so complex that they have to turn back and take a different route to the Academy. Tamani tells Rowen to disguise herself and go to Rhoslyn's, where she will be safe. At the Academy, they're attacked by trolls. David fights them as Tamani, Laurel and Jamison get inside the Academy, but is locked out in the process. Tamani promises Laurel that since David has the sword, he will be okay, and Laurel finds Chelsea, unharmed. The Fall faeries have armed themselves with the trolls' guns. Outside, David is starting to tire from holding the sword, so Laurel, Chelsea and Tamani pull him up onto a balcony, away from the trolls, so he can rest a little. When David removes his ruined, bloody shirt, the Fall faeries are surprised to see chest hair—they hadn't realised he or Chelsea were human. Laurel patches him and Tamani up but just as David is about to go fight the trolls again, they start dropping dead. Klea, with Yuki, sets fire to the Academy, forcing the faeries to evacuate. Tamani says her next goal will be the Winter Palace, then they all notice a strange, oily, red gas leaking into the Academy. David cuts a doorway into the greenhouse and everyone begins dragging unconscious faeries out to safety, but Laurel is slowed down as she tries to save Mara. Yeardley orders the doorway to be blocked so the poison cannot get in, and David does so as Tamani screams at them to stop. Distraught, Tamani goes to find Klea, to either kill her or be killed by her.

Laurel asks Chelsea where David and Tamani are, exhausted from dragging Mara to safety. Chelsea says they both made it out, but she can't see Tamani. It is revealed that Katya, who looks very like Laurel, did not get out in time. When she cannot find Tamani, Laurel realises he must have mistaken Katya for her and thinks that Laurel is dead. Tamani attacks Klea, who orders Yuki to attack him, but she is too untrained in magic. Just as Tamani is about to kill Klea, Laurel arrives and cries out for him to stop. Klea tells David she wants to fix Avalon's backwards thinking and that as a human, which most faeries disdain, he should join her. David refuses. Laurel tries to appeal to Yuki, who ignores her and traps David and Tamani—though she asks Klea not to hurt them. Jamison arrives, weak but awake, and is unintimidated by Yuki. He tells Yuki how Klea—before she was exiled—was brilliant and could have done a lot of good. He asks Yuki if Klea loves her; if Klea would still love her if Yuki walked away from all her plans, and says he voted against exiling Klea. Yuki knocks Jamison unconscious and Klea tackles Tamani, about to kill him until Yuki intervenes. In retaliation, Klea stabs Yuki through her blossom, and takes a small wound on the side of her neck to stab Tamani in the collar. She then reveals that the blade is poisoned, and they will die within hours. Only the viridefaeco potion can save them, and Klea will save Tamani if Laurel agrees to join her. Laurel remembers Yeardley telling her on her first day at the Academy that no one remembers how to make the viridefaeco potion anymore. Klea explains that her 'vaccines' for the trolls were what killed them. Laurel asks what Klea wants her to do, and Klea tells her to find Marion and Yasmine, to tell them to trade their lives for Klea's cures. Klea wants a new Avalon with no Winter faeries. Laurel agrees, though Tamani and David are confident that she's lying. She leaves, and Yuki apologises to Tamani for her involvement and confesses she doesn't want to die with Tamani hating her. She adds that after the winter formal, she had been intending to join Tamani against Klea. Tamani apologises for not giving her that chance.

Yuki asks if Tamani has anything metal. He gives her his knife and she transforms it into something that terrifies Tamani. Yuki tells him she loves him, then dies in his arms. Laurel tells Chelsea to go to the Winter Palace and instruct the sentries not to let Marion or Yasmine leave until Chelsea confirms they're safe. Laurel goes to the World Tree, cutting her hand and its bark to force a connection that usually requires hours or days of meditation, asking for help with Klea's poison. The Silent Ones tel her to think like Klea, and one voice begs her to 'save his son'. Laurel realises she has to understand the poison in order to figure out the antidote. She returns to Klea and the others, deliberately infecting herself with poison from Tamani's wound. At the Academy, she asks Fiona, a faerie who was trying to create the viridefaeco potion, for help. Fiona has the base, and she knows that it is correct, but she is missing a key ingredient. Laurel knows it's not an extinct plant because she is sure she has encountered it, and suddenly realises that the missing ingredient is humans.

She asks Chelsea for some of her blood, and the viridefaeco potion is completed. Laurel cures herself, then rushes back to Tamani and Klea. She administers the antidote to Tamani, and after a few moments he, too, is cured. Klea, however, does not let Laurel cure her, refusing to live in Laurel's 'perfect world', and dies. Jamison finally comes to and Laurel explains everything that happened. Marion and Yasmine then arrive, are informed of what happened, and Marion says Chelsea and David cannot be allowed to leave Avalon. David has used Excalibur and humans cannot be trusted to keep such incredible secrets. David threatens to use Excalibur to cut the gates, but admits he can't bring himself to do it because it would leave Avalon so vulnerable. Jamison offers to open the gates anyway, and Marion says he will be executed for treason if he does. He still offers, but Tamani refuses him, and asks that everyone meet in the Gate Garden in an hour. Jamison tells Laurel that he might not be around when she next comes to Avalon, because he has been planning his own way to restructure the hierarchy, ever since Yasmine—who is too close in age to Marion, and so would never been Queen herself—sprouted. He chose Laurel to be the scion because she was friends with Tamani, a Spring faerie, and has been teaching Yasmine to respect all faeries, not just the powerful ones. He is willing to die—to be executed by Marion—to ensure his idea for a better Avalon comes to fruition.

At the gate, David asks Laurel if they're ever getting back together, though he already knows the answer. Laurel wasn't completely sure until she thought Tamani was dead from Klea's poison, but she is sure now. Tamani returns from telling Shar's family what happened and tells Laurel he can no longer be her protector; his feelings keep getting in the way. Laurel tells him she doesn't care if he's her protector or not, but begs him not to leave her, and that she is asking for him, for forever. Chelsea arrives, having been told to bring all the Spring and Summer faeries to watch what's about to happen. When Marion arrives, and orders Jamison and Yasmine to arrest Tamani and the others; they both refuse. Tamani then tells Laurel, Chelsea and David to gather around him, and he pulls his transformed knife from his pocket: Yuki turned it into a key. A lock appears on the gate, and Tamani opens it, hides the key again, and the four of them walk out of Avalon. Laurel puts Chelsea's hand in David's, then takes Tamani's hand, reflecting that since she is with him, she is already home.

Years later, David writes a letter to Chelsea, who has just given birth to a daughter, Sophie, with her husband, Jason. David has become a doctor, but is haunted by Avalon, so has asked Laurel to create a memory elixir that will erase all knowledge of faeries and Avalon from his mind. He wants to be a good husband to his fiancée, Rose. Unwilling to let his story be completely lost forever, he has written it down for Sophie, and Chelsea can do with it as she pleases—burn it, hide it, publish it. Lastly, he asks Chelsea to introduce him to Tamani if she can; he misses him already.

== Characters ==
Laurel is a Fall/Autumn faerie and the main character of the series. She is a scion; sent to live with humans when she was a child so she could inherit land that contains a gate to Avalon. She struggles with choosing her human life over her life in Avalon, as well as her human love, David, over her faerie love, Tamani.

Tamani is a Spring faerie and Laurel's fear-gleidhidh, her guardian charged with making sure she stays safe and fulfils her duties as the scion. He was Laurel's friend before she had her mind erased to become the scion, and has been in love with her since they were children. He eventually wins Laurel's heart.

David is Laurel's best friend and former boyfriend. He is the first person she confided in when she learned she was a faerie. Since he is human, he is able to wield Excalibur to defend Avalon. At the end of the series, he chooses to have his memories of faerie and Avalon erased so he can move on.

Chelsea is another of Laurel's best friends. She has had a crush on David for years and the two get together at the end of the book, though the epilogue reveals they eventually break up. Chelsea marries a man named Jason and has a daughter called Sophie.

Klea (real name Callista) is a Fall faerie who was exiled after she became too zealous about making potions from faeries, including poisons. She worked with Jeremiah Barnes and the other trolls to gain access to the gate to Avalon. She chooses to die from her own poison rather than be cured and live as a prisoner.

Yuki is a Winter faerie raised by Klea so she could gain access to Avalon. She is in love with Tamani and eventually betrays Klea to make a key that will open the gate to Avalon without a Winter faerie. She is killed by Klea's poisoned sword.

Shar is another Spring faerie and the sentry in charge of guarding the gate to Avalon. He has been protecting Laurel ever since she was sent to live with humans, watching over her for her entire life. To ensure Laurel's parents would be willing to adopt Laurel when she was left on their doorstep, he sterilised Laurel's mother. He is killed by Klea when she discovers him investigating her headquarters.

== Critical reception ==
Destined received critical acclaim prior to its release, garnering a starred review from VOYA. New York Times best-selling young adult author Claudia Gray endorsed the book with a cover blurb stating, "The greatest part: the Wings series reaches the perfect ending. The worst part: it has to end!" The Romantic Times awarded Destined a "top pick," noting that "Pike's clever and innovative way of reinventing fairy tales and myths to make them her own is wonderful...[The] story is rich in vivid details, action, adventure, and romance."
