= List of motorcycle clubs =

This is a list of motorcycle-related clubs with articles on Wikipedia.

Name	Year founded	Location
59 Club	1962	London, England
Antique Motorcycle Club of America	1954	New England, United States
Association of Recovering Motorcyclists	1986	Worldwide
The Bike Shed Motorcycle Club	2015	London, England
Bikers for Christ	1990	Marysville, California, United States
BMW Motorcycle Owners of America	1972	
Boozefighters	1946	California, United States
Canadian Army Veteran Motorcycle Units (CAV)	2003	
Christian Motorcyclists Association	1975	Hatfield, Arkansas, United States
Combat Veterans Motorcycle Association	2001	United States
Cornerstone Motorcycle Ministry	1978	
Cycle Queens of America	1958	
Freewheelers EVS	1990	Somerset, Bristol, Bath, West Wiltshire, South Gloucestershire
God's Squad CMC	1971	Australia > 16 countries, 40 chapters
Harley Owners Group	1983	Worldwide
Holy Riders	1981	Norway, Australia, Germany
Jewish Motorcyclists Alliance	2004	Worldwide
London Ladies' Motor Club	1926	London, England
Madras Bulls	2002	Chennai, India
Moped Army	1997	United States
Motor Maids	1940	United States and Canada
Motorcycle Riders Association of Australia	1978	Victoria, Australia
Night Wolves	1989	Soviet Union
Patriot Guard Riders	2005	Mulvane, Kansas, United States
Rainbow Motorcycle Club	1971	San Francisco, California, United States
The Royal British Legion Riders Branch	2004	
Satyrs Motorcycle Club	1957	Los Angeles, California, United States
Shrewsbury Motocross Club	1976	Shrewsbury area, West Midlands region of England
Triumph Owners Motor Cycle Club	1949	Worldwide
Vintage Motor Cycle Club	1946	Staffordshire, England
Women in the Wind MC	1979	Toledo, Ohio, United States
Women's International Motorcycle Association	1978	Australia
Leather & Lace Motorcycle Club	1983	Florida, United States
Untouchables Motorcycle Club	2000	United States
Bikers Brotherhood MC	1988	Indonesia

== See also ==
- List of outlaw motorcycle clubs
