= The Found Poetry Review =

- Discipline: Literary journal
- Language: English
- Edited by: Jenni B. Baker

Publication details
- History: 2011-2016
- Frequency: Biannually

Standard abbreviations
- ISO 4: Found Poet. Rev.

Links
- Journal homepage

The Found Poetry Review was a biannual American literary magazine dedicated exclusively to publishing erasure (artform), cut-up and other forms of found poetry. The journal published seven volumes of found poetry from its inception in 2011, initially launching online and migrating to print in mid-2012. It was based in Bethesda, Maryland.

== Background ==
The mission of The Found Poetry Review was to "celebrate the poetry in the existing and the everyday." The journal published found poetry sourced from both traditional and nontraditional texts, including newspaper articles, instruction booklets, dictionaries, toothpaste boxes, biographies, Craigslist posts, speeches, existing poems and other sources. Approximately nine percent of all submissions were accepted for publication; to date, the journal has published the work of more than 150 poets.

== Issues ==
From 2011 to 2016, the Found Poetry Review published seven volumes of work. Each volume of the journal featured contributions from 25 to 30 poets. Additionally, the journal published special online issues of found poetry, including a 2013 issue dedicated to David Foster Wallace and a 2014 edition celebrating Bloomsday.

From 2012 to 2016, the Found Poetry Review engaged 70–80 poets per year in National Poetry Month-related projects. In February 2014, editors were invited to speak on project-driven publicity at the Association of Writers & Writing Programs annual conference in Seattle, Washington.

=== Oulipost ===
In 2014, the journal selected 78 poets from seven countries to participate in Oulipost. The project—whose name is a mash-up of Oulipo and "the post"—guided poets to apply experimental literature techniques to text source from poets' daily newspapers. Participating poets were profiled in the Fairbanks Daily News-Miner, The Salt Lake Tribune, What Weekly and the Hebden Bridge Times among other publications. The project resulted in the creation of 2,300 new poems.

=== Pulitzer Remix ===
In April 2013, the Found Poetry Review hosted Pulitzer Remix, an initiative that united 85 poets to create found poetry from the (then) 85 Pulitzer Prize for Fiction-winning texts. Poets, each of whom created new works from a specific novel, collectively created 2,550 new poems by month's end. The resulting poems garnered more than 12,200 comments and nearly 180,000 page views during the month. News coverage on the project was widespread, with profiles appearing in venues such as The Phoenix, WORT, the York Daily Record, and many others.

=== The Found Poetry Project ===
On the heels of a successfully funded Kickstarter campaign, the Found Poetry Review distributed 250 found poetry kits in public spaces across America. The kits instructed finders to create a found poem from the kit contents and upload the results on the (now-defunct) project website.

== Masthead ==
- Editor-in-Chief: Jenni B. Baker
- Senior Poetry Editor / Web Manager: Beth Ayer
- Book Reviews Editor: Douglas J. Luman
- News and Resources Editor: Martin Elwell
- Poetry Editors: E. Kristin Anderson, Justin Bond, Deborah Hauser, Vicki Hudson, S.E. Ingraham, Sonja Johanson and Amanda Papenfus.
