= Effervescent Collective =

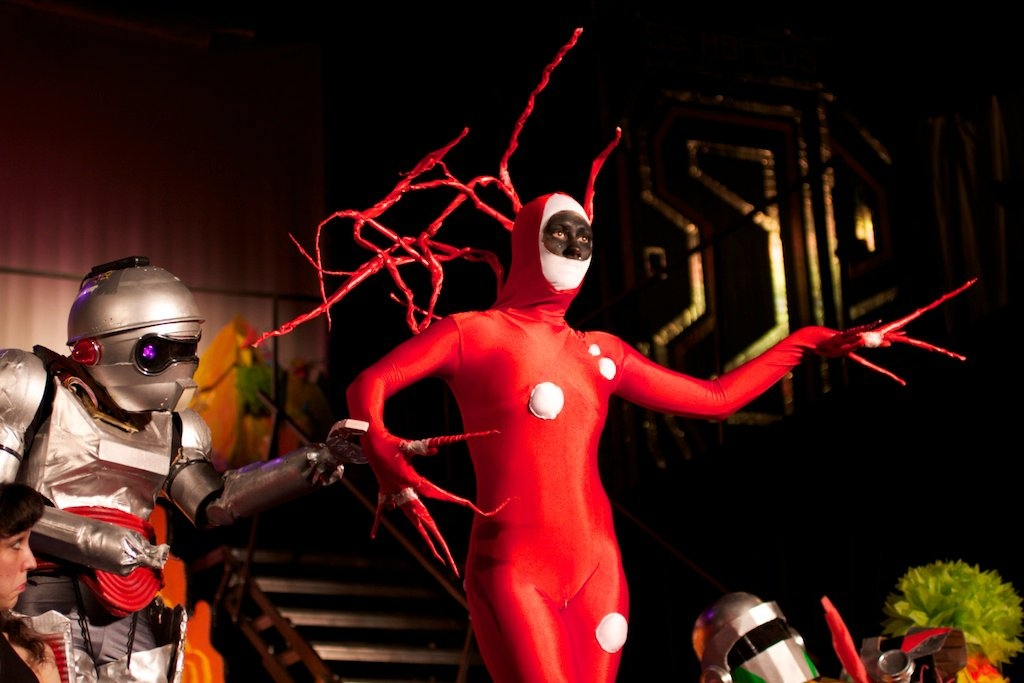
- Formation: 2008
- Dissolved: 2014
- Type: Experimental dance collective
- Headquarters: Baltimore, Maryland, United States
- Region served: Baltimore
- Official language: English
- Founder and director: Lily Kind

Effervescent Collective was an organization of dancers, choreographers, physical performers, and multidisciplinary artists that presented work exclusively in Baltimore, Maryland. Founded just after the 2008 financial crisis, the company derived its name from anthropologist's Emile Durkheim’s term “collective effervescence” to describe the larger-than-the-sum-of-its-parts feeling to large group assemblies, such as concerts or sporting events.

== History ==
Effervescent Collective was founded by Lily Kind while at Goucher College, just as an influx of artists settled in Baltimore in the wake of the 2008 financial crisis. Effervescent produced over a dozen full-length productions between 2008 and 2014 and curated different forms of local showcases that featured other emergent dance creators in the city. These productions and events helped expand Baltimore's dance and physical theater scene by producing the work of many emerging artists and insisting on the presence of experimental dance in the city's blossoming arts community. Effervescent was known for activating unconventional and unused spaces for dance, as well as supporting dancers who found they did not fit into conventions of the concert dance world.

During Effervescent's existence, Kind oversaw the majority of productions, which were created with and danced by a changing set of members over the group's seven-year existence. Members often also popped up in impromptu installation-style performances at local festivals Artscape and High Zero. Members also appeared in music videos of local musicians Dungeonesse, Dan Deacon and Bosley. Members of Effervescent performed and developed many of the dancing roles for the Baltimore Rock Opera Society.

Effervescent was known for its use of non-traditional spaces, partly out of economic necessity, and partly out of an interest in creating immersive experience for the audience. Effervescent created performances unique to Area 405, Patapsco State Park, Baltimore Skate Park, 2640 Space, Sanctuary Bodyworks, the former The Coward Shoe, the former Maryland Art Place, and Now Child Sound Stage. Individual members also collaborated with rising local theaters such as Baltimore Annex Theater and Single Carrot Theater.

Effervescent was under the fiscal sponsorship of Fractured Atlas, and sustained itself through member contributions and the profits from prolific performance schedule. After Kind's departure from Baltimore in 2014, Effervescent disbanded. Some members who remained in Baltimore have since established Baltimore Independent Dance Theater, a dance presenting and curating organization. Former member Britta Grant moved to Los Angeles in 2014 and has found success in the commercial dance industry. Claire Cote now works out of Berlin as multi-media performer Zaftik. Lynne Price was the 2017 Artist in Residence at UMBC, her graduate alma mater.

== Accolades ==
Effervescent was frequently named "Best Dance Company" by some of the city's major news outlets, including The Baltimore Sun and Baltimore Magazine. Baltimore City Paper awarded Effervescent the title for three consecutive years.

== Performers and members ==
The first wave of members were recent graduates of social sciences programs at Goucher College including Peace Studies, Anthropology, Education, Philosophy, Psychology, and Religion. Long standing members included: Britta Grant, Erin Reid, Lynne Price, Jenny B.N., Clarissa Gregory, Pilar Diaz, Christine Striver, Emile Sorger, Peter Redgrave, Marlys Yvonne, Laura Grossman, Melissa Talleda, Marilyn Mullens, Sierra DeSalvia, and Claire Cote - many of whom have since developed professions in the fields of dance, visual art, wellness, health, or social justice.

== Works ==
=== Productions ===
- Dirty Dancing, 2010 (Directed by Claire Cote and Lily Kind)
- Powermoves Forever, 2011 (Directed by Claire Cote)
- Cove Folder, 2011(Directed by Lily Kind)
- Turn Into, 2012 (Directed by collective members, including Lynne Price, Melissa Talleda, Pilar Diaz, Clarissa Gregory, Tiffany Seal, Erin Reid)
- Butterknife, 2013 (Directed by Lily Kind)
- Tendao, 2013 (Including small group and solo works by collective members)
- Pull Drift, 2013 (Directed by Clarissa Gregory) Adapted into a film by Meg Rorinson.

=== Collaborations ===
- Baltimore Dance Round Robin
- Effervescent Diaspora

Effervescent also collaborated with Seattle-based experimental dance troupe, Pendleton House, led by Babette McGeady
