= Baltimore Rock Opera Society =

Non-profit rock opera theatrical company

- Abbreviation: BROS
- Formation: 2009
- Type: Rock opera theatrical company
- Location: Baltimore, Maryland
- Website: baltimorerockopera.org

The Baltimore Rock Opera Society (BROS) is an official 501c3 non-profit organization founded in 2007 by Aran Keating, John DeCampos, Dylan Koehler, Eli Breitburg-Smith, and Jared Margulies with the mission of producing original, live rock operas.

BROS opened their first performance, Gründlehämmer, at 2640 Space in Baltimore in 2009. They hold open auditions for all their mainstage shows, including band auditions. Starting in 2011, BROS launched pitch parties, in which they asked the Baltimore community for ideas and suggestions on future rock operas. BROS Headquarters (HQ), where they currently operate, is located on the first floor of the Bell Foundry, a multi-purpose, cooperatively-run performance and rehearsal space. As of May 2018, the BROS has produced thirteen original stage productions and staged many other events and performances. The company performs in various venues in Baltimore, Washington D.C., and Philadelphia.

== Rock Operas and Events ==
=== Gründlehämmer (2009) ===
The Baltimore Rock Opera Society debuted its first feature-length rock opera in October 2009. Featuring monsters, magic, and fantastical adventure, Gründlehämmer introduced the world to the BROS's sense of the epic. The plot follows a farmer and citizen of the nation of Brotopia who wields his mighty command over the power of true rock to defeat the evil cave-dwelling Grundle and release Brotopia from the iron grip of the tyrannical Dark King Lothario.

=== The BROS Double Feature ===
In June 2011, BROS debuted two new plays, Amphion, a love story set in a magical realist 6th c. BC Constantinople, and The Terrible Secret of Lunastus.

Both shows were eventually remounted as full-length feature productions, Amphion in 2016 and Lunastus in 2017.

=== Valhella: The Ragnarøkkoperetta ===
In May 2012 at the Autograph Playhouse in Baltimore, MD, BROS debuted their fourth feature-length rock opera, Valhella, written by Jen Tydings and directed by Aran Keating.

Valhella was loosely adapted from Norse mythology and executed in pursuit of what composer Richard Wagner called Gesamtkunstwerk – “that mashup of spectacle, ritual, dance, music, theater, and other artsy stuff that is opera at its most extreme.” The opera used large puppets, hand-drawn animation, intricate sets featuring a full-scale World tree, and a soundtrack ranging from traditional Norse folk music to power metal. Vahella was considered a monumental leap forward in the BROS’ production value. All eight shows sold out, which prompted the BROS to add a ninth encore presentation at midnight on 20 May 2012, which also sold out. The opera was well reviewed by the Washington Post.

=== Murdercastle ===
In May 2013 at the Autograph Playhouse in Baltimore, MD, BROS debuted their fifth feature-length rock opera, Murdercastle, written by Jared Margulies and directed by Barbara Geary. The play is about H. H. Holmes during the 1893 Chicago World's Fair.

=== Gründlehämmer (2014) ===
From March to April 2014, at 2640 Space in Baltimore, MD, The Torpedo Factory Art Center in Alexandria, VA, and The Ruba Club in Philadelphia, BROS reimagined and transformed their original production, Gründlehämmer. This remount was again directed by Aran Keating.

=== Convergence Maximus ===
In November 2014 at 2640 Space in Baltimore, BROS collaborated with the Concert Artists of Baltimore (CAB) on Convergence Maximus to produce a mix of classical greats, such as Tchaikovsky's Violin Concerto, and select songs from past BROS shows, such as Valhella. These were arranged to include CAB's professional orchestra and choir.

=== Rock Opera 6-Pack ===
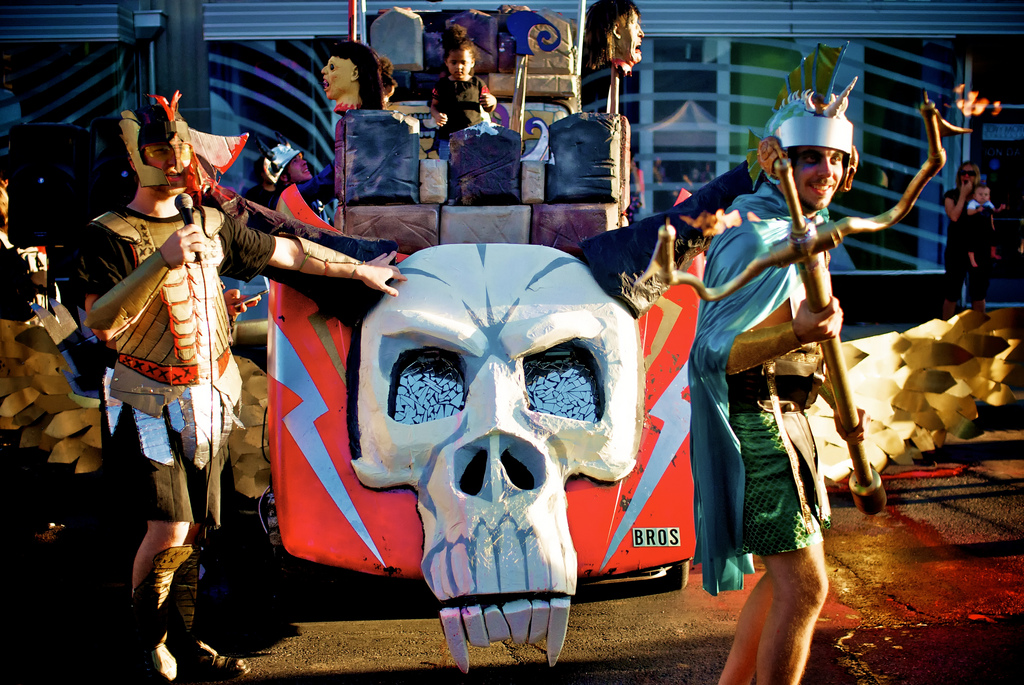
The BROS "Brothership", a converted 1988 Saab 900, which first premiered at the Baltimore Artscape festival in July 2010.

The Rock Opera 6-Pack debuted in May 2015 at the Creative Alliance in Baltimore. The 6-pack was a new format for the BROS: a collection of six one-act rock operas, 25 minutes each, performed over two weekends. "A" Weekend featured Determination of Azimuth, Revival, and Sidelines. "B" Weekend featured Battle at Apple Crossing, Legend of Jessie Jean, and RATS!

At Artscape 2015, the 6-Pack was remounted in BROCEAN CITY, located on Charles Street. BROCEAN CITY not only featured five of the 6-pack but also included local bands, puppet shows, and air guitar battles atop the BRÖTHERSHIP, a converted 1988 Saab 900.

==== "A" Weekend ====
- Determination of Azimuth: was created by Eric Church and Heather Graham and directed by Lola Pierson. The show is the story of Katherine Johnson, who rose above barriers of race and gender to become a famous mathematician for the Apollo program.
- Revival was directed by Craig Coletta and composed by Samuel Burt. The opera features a faith healer at a tent revival who encounters a demon possessing a young child.
- Sidelines was written, directed, and composed by Jack Sossman. The opera features many aspects of sports, including “glorious victories, crushing defeats, last-minute plays, training montages, and foot-stomping anthemic glam rock.”

==== "B" Weekend ====
- The Battle of Blue Apple Crossing was created and composed by Nairobi Collins and directed by Sarah “Flash” Gorman. The opera is a retelling of the legend of Robert Johnson at the crossroads, where a talented blues musician is the victim of a lynching, and his soul becomes the subject of a battle of wits and strength between the Christian devil and the African trickster god Legba.
- The Legend of Jessie Jean was created and directed by Matt Casella. The opera is a dark Western folk tale where outlaws swap campfire stories about a ruthless bounty hunter hell-bent on bringing criminals to justice, featuring shadowplay.
- RATS! was created and co-composed by Naomi Davidoff and Andres Lobo and directed by Amanda Rife. The opera was a punk/garage-rock parody of a popular Broadway show. RATS! told the story of a motley crew of hard-rocking rodents just trying to dance, party, and fall in love – with a sinister exterminator on their tails.

=== Chronoshred: The Adventures of Stardust Lazerdong ===
In January 2015, BROS premiered Chronoshred: The Adventures of Stardust Lazerdong, an action-packed sci-fi comedy telling the story of a time-traveling rock god and his band of colorful alien characters as they battle an evil mega-corporation and fulfill their destiny to throw the biggest concert of all time (literally).

Taking inspiration from 80s and 90s Saturday morning cartoons, Chronoshred featured madcap antics, colorful sets, costumes, and props, and was told in an episodic format.

=== Amphion ===
Debuting in June 2016, Amphion is the tragic love story of a supernatural songwriter in ancient Constantinople. The show was the first of the BROS's 2011 Double Feature to be remounted into a full-length feature production.

=== Brides of Tortuga ===
Brides of Tortuga, BROS's eighth original rock opera, debuted in October 2016 at the Chesapeake Bay Performing Arts Center. Tortuga is set in 1661 and follows a mutinous group of women who liberate a group of captured women in Calais, France, capture a French navy ship, and escape across the open Atlantic to free more women captured on the island of Tortuga. A work of historical fiction, Tortuga is loosely based on the history of the island of Tortuga and uses the fallout from the Fronde as its backdrop.

=== The Terrible Secret of Lunastus ===
The Terrible Secret of Lunastus, which premiered in a remount of an earlier, shorter production part of the BROS's 2011 Double Feature, is a sci-fi comedic adventure. As the moon falls towards Earth on the eve of our planet's destruction, four astronauts and their robot, Android, travel to the mysterious world of Lunastus to determine its suitability as a new home planet. The creatures the crew meets change the course of their lives and the fate of the planet.

=== Constellations & Crossroads ===
Run in February 2018, Constellations & Crossroads was a double-feature in collaboration with The Arena Players, showcasing two 6-Pack short plays: Determination of Azimuth and The Battle of Blue Apple Crossing. The plays center on two important Black figures in American history (Katherine Johnson in Azimuth and Robert Johnson in Battle) and feature a cast and crew from The Arena Players, Baltimore's oldest continuously running African American community theater company.

=== Incredibly Dead! ===
Debuting in May 2018, Incredibly Dead! was created as a tribute to B-level horror films, such as From Beyond. Twenty years ago, General Maximilian Morder devised a plan to control the world with the aid of a necromantic goo. The elixir falls into the hands of Reggie and Silas Cryptz, two down-on-their-luck morticians desperate to turn their business around after drawing the ire of a family they've cheated in the past. Featuring gratuitous gore, slapstick humor, and original music inspired by classic science-fiction film soundtracks, Incredibly Dead! is getting positive reviews from the Baltimore theater community.

=== Lurid Happenings ===
Debuted October 2018 at The Peale Center.

=== Welcome to Shakesville ===
Debuted May 2019 at Zion Lutheran Church.

=== Space Kümité ===
Debuted November 2019 at Peabody Heights Brewery.

=== The Shadow Showdown ===
Debuted May 2021 at The Meadow.

=== Holes: A Puppet Anthology ===
BROS' debut feature length film. Screened July 2021 at Senator Theatre.

=== Glitterus: Dragon Rising ===
Debuted May 2022 at Zion Lutheran Church.

=== Love & ROAR! ===
Debuted November 2022 at 1 E Baltimore St.

=== The Gold Night ===
Debuted September 2023 at 1 E Baltimore St.

=== A Computer That Loves: And Why Not To Build One ===
Debuted May 2024 at Zion Lutheran Church.

=== Ceremony of the Faceless ===
Debuted October 2024 at 1915 Maryland Ave.

=== Lempira ===
Debuted May 2025 at Zion Lutheran Church.

=== Garbage Quest ===
Debuted October 2025 at 1915 Maryland Ave.

=== American Vamp ===
American Vamp was set in 1980s New York, at a fictional corporation run entirely by vampires. It was performed at Zion Lutheran Church from May 29th through June 20th, 2026.

== Reception ==
As an all-volunteer company, BROS has attracted the support of the surrounding community. Those involved in the productions range from experienced theater professionals to complete amateurs. In 2012, Baltimore City Paper named Baltimore Rock Opera Society “Best DIY Theater Company” in Baltimore.

== Documentary ==
There is a feature-length documentary film about BROS and the Murdercastle production. The film was directed by Human Being Productions and produced by the digital magazine What Weekly. It features original animation, an interview, and additional footage from the production.
