= Artscape (festival) =

Annual art festival in Baltimore, Maryland

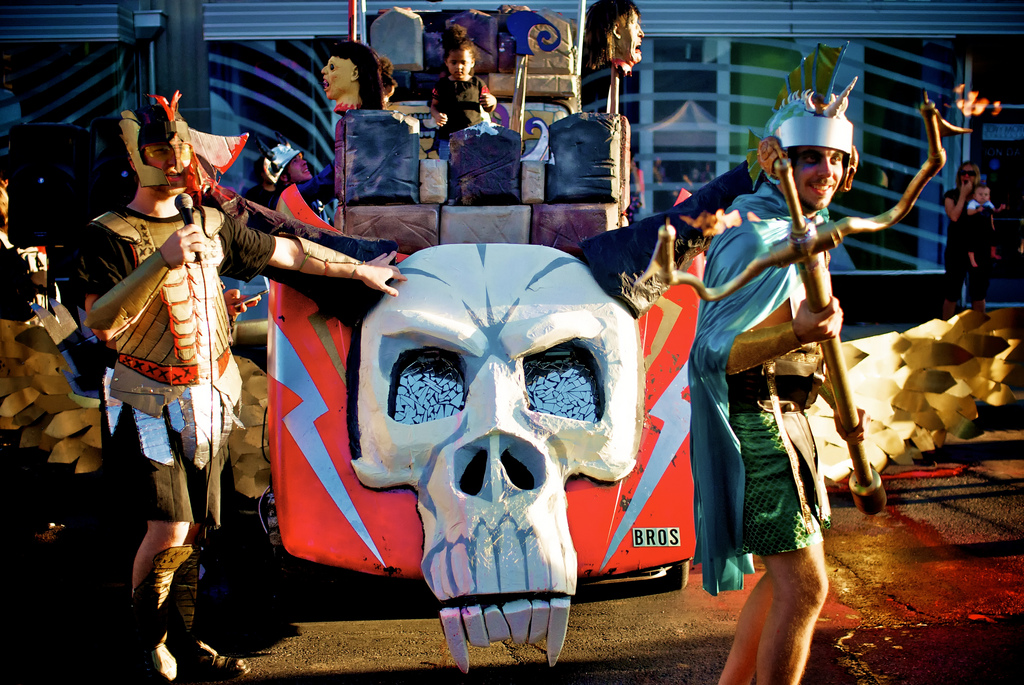
The Baltimore Rock Opera Society "Brothership", a converted 1988 Saab 900, which first premiered at Artscape in July 2010.

Artscape is an annual art festival held in Baltimore, Maryland. Previously held in the vicinity of Maryland Institute College of Art in July, Artscape was moved to Downtown and Memorial Day weekend as of 2025. Since its first annual event in 1982, Artscape has become the largest free arts festival in America. It has boasted acts such as Ray Charles and Aretha Franklin in the past, attracting over 350,000 people from the city, and surrounding areas. Film programming during Artscape is provided by Maryland Film Festival. There are artists in a variety of visual and performing media. Events are free and open to the public.

== Funding ==
According to Artscape, 43% of the funding for 2010's event came from sponsorships and contributions, while 29% came from concession income, the remaining funds came from fundraising, and grants. The report states that about 18% of their expenses in 2010 went to administrative costs, 3% to fundraising activities, while the majority 79% went to program expenses. Artscape organizers estimate that the total economic impact for the City of Baltimore in 2010 was $25.97 million. It is reported that 2009 attendees spend $9,256,046 with Artscape vendors.

== Programs ==
Artscape includes various programs and artwork displays, including juried exhibitions, installations, literary arts, visual arts, and performances. Musical performances take place at various stages across Baltimore. Past notable musical performers have included Aretha Franklin (1994), Al Green (2003), and Isaac Hayes (2004), among others.

== Musical line-up ==
=== 2016 ===
- BGE Main Stage
  - Wyclef Jean
  - Burning Spear
  - The Mighty Mighty Bosstones
  - Jah Works
  - Spirit Blues
  - Chelsey Green and the Green Project
  - Of Tomorrow
  - Foggy May
  - 8 Ohms Band
  - Tropik Sol
  - Bond Street District
  - Reggie Wayne Morris
  - Thurgood Marshall Band
  - Aztec Soul
- Johns Hopkins University Station North Stage
  - Baltimore City Public Schools' Young Audiences Summer Arts and Learning Academies
  - Hotline
  - F featuring Landis Expandis
  - Parks Landing
  - The Henchmen
  - Prince Dance Party featuring Wendel Patrick & DJ Dubble8, DJ Sam Burns
  - Modern Nomad
  - Fake Flowers Real Dirt
  - Lost Keys
  - Surf Harp
  - Weekends
  - Sun Club
  - Bmore Does Bowie (featuring Aguierre's Dogs, Scroll Downers, Ed Schrader's Music Beat, SYS Band and The Band that Fell to Earth)
  - Milestones
  - Scroll Downers
  - Expert Alterations
  - Chiffon
  - Bmore Beatscape hosted by Eze Jackson
- Morgan State University Sound Off Live Stage
  - Michele McTierney
  - Coexist Music Group and Devin Jano
  - Spaceboy
  - DBS
  - Rumba Club
  - David Bach
  - The Coldspring Jazz Quartet
  - Orchester Prazevica
  - Gotham Theory
  - Greenspan
  - Naked Jungle
  - Dunson
  - Michael Raitzyk Quartet
  - Tongue in Cheek
  - High-Brid Band
  - Essential Vybe
  - The Palovations
  - Edjacated Phools

=== 2015 ===
- George Clinton & Parliament Funkadelic
- The Reverend Peyton's Big Damn Band
- Michael Franti & Spearhead
- Trombone Shorty & Orleans Avenue
- Martian Architect
- Slow Lights
- Reve
- Purple Orange
- Inde
- Kanika
- Goat
- Subtle Hustle
- Quinton Randall
- 10 Step Groove
- The Upstarters
- D.T. Huber
- 9 Mile Roots
- The Slanted Sound
- Hollywood Banks

=== 2014 ===
- MEA Energy Stage
  - Anthony Hamilton
  - Sharon Jones & The Dap-Kings
  - Ozomatli
  - Galactic
  - Carl Filipiak
  - Emily King
  - Nadine Ray & The Allstars
  - Kelly Bell Band
  - Joe Cooper Project
  - By & By
  - Sweet Leda
  - The Crawdaddies
  - May Weather
  - Kevin Jackson
- Station North Stage
  - The Players Band
  - All Mighty Senators
  - Baltimore City Public Schools
  - Blind Man Leading
  - Brooks Long and the Mad Dog No Good
  - Bobby E Lee & The Sympathizers
  - Small Apartments
  - 8 Ohms Band
  - Skydivers
  - Wyoming Exploding
  - Deaf Scene
  - Andy Poxon
  - Bosley
  - Super City
  - Connor Brendan Band
  - Among Wolves
- The Festival Stage
  - Tom Principato
  - Cowboy Mouth
  - The Glenmont Popes
  - Yellow Dubmarine
  - Reverend Horton Heat
  - Blizz
  - Mystic Warriors
  - T.K. Blue
  - Evokatones
  - Muddy Crows
  - Eureka Birds
  - Honest Haloway
  - Plurals
  - Lotus Song & The Black Light Asylum
  - Voodoo Pharmacology
  - Rufus Roundtree & Da B'More Brass Factory
  - MC Booze
  - No BS! Brass Band

=== 2013 ===
- Wells Fargo Main Stage
  - Brittanie Thomas
  - Bridget Kelly
  - Kem
  - iLyAIMY
  - Krar Collective
  - Jukebox the Ghost
  - The Dirty Dozen Brass Band
  - North Mississippi Allstars
  - Tosin
  - Meena Cryle & The Chriss Fillmore Band
  - Flying Eyes
  - The Wailers
- Festival Stage
  - Basement Instinct
  - Sojourne
  - The Rez
  - Bill O'Connell & The Latin Jazz Allstars
  - Reina Williams
  - The Control
  - Straight Up Tribal
  - UllNevaNo
  - Lafayette Gilchrist & The New Volcanoes
  - United States Navy Band Country Current
  - The Booby Traps
  - Reesa Renee
  - Greasy Hands
  - Don Trunk
  - Sine' Qua Non
  - Appaloosa
- Station North Stage
  - Baltimore City Public Schools
  - Leland Palmer
  - Lazlo Lee & The Motherless Children
  - J Pope & Funk Friday
  - Matmos
  - Victims of Experience
  - Yellow North
  - Thee Lexington Arrows
  - Val Yumm
  - Allie the Cats
  - Dead Melotron
  - Dreamboat Armada
  - Bad Seed Rising
  - Wild Honey
  - Red Sammy

=== 2012 ===
- Wells Fargo Stage
  - Navasha Daya
  - Brian McKnight
  - Black Joe Lewis & the Honeybears
  - Clutch
  - Dontae Winslow & Winslowdynasty
  - Easy Star All-Stars
  - Rebirth Brass Band
- Festival Stage
  - Tom Principato
  - Donegal X-Press
  - Julienne Irwin
  - Café Red Band Howard "Funkyfoot" Brooks Productions
  - Maimouna Youssef
- Station North Stage
  - Arbouretum
  - Big In Japan
  - Yeveto
  - Celebration
  - Egg Babies Orchestra
  - Caleb Stine

=== 2011 ===
- Wells Fargo Stage
  - Fantasia
  - Southern Culture On The Skids
  - G. Love & Special Sauce
  - Matisyahu
  - Miguel
  - Nikka Costa
  - The Pietasters
  - The 8 Ohms Band
  - Carolyn Malachi
  - The Players Band
  - The Jon Bailey Band
  - Can't Hang
- Festival Stage
  - Mosno Al-Moseeki
  - E Major
  - Superland Stage Band
  - Telesma
  - Unity Reggae Band
  - Pompeii Graffiti
  - The Kings of Crownsville
  - The Rise Band
  - Andy Poxon
  - The Crawdaddies
  - Orch Kids
  - The Band Belief
  - Larry Brown Quartet
  - Big Daddy Stallings
- Urbanite Stage
  - Baltimore City Public Schools Showcase
  - Strings and Things
  - Matt Wigler
  - Lee Pearson
  - Bottle of Blues
  - Eric Byrd Trio
  - Turn Around Norman
  - Love Craft
  - Kevin Driscoll
  - Time Out
  - Blues Society
  - Community Groove
  - Tom Williams Quintet.

=== 2010 ===
- Wells Fargo Stage
  - Gov't Mule
  - Jackie Greene
  - Cold War Kids
  - Musiq Soulchild
  - Wale
  - Maysa Matarazzo
  - Rebelution
- Charm City Stage
  - Toubab Krewe
  - Sahffi
  - Breaking Reign
- Urbanite Stage
  - Eric Kennedy Quartet
  - Jump Street
  - Michael Raitzyk Trio
- Festival Stage
  - Fools & Horses
  - Higher Hands
  - Mambo Combo

=== 2009 ===
- Robin Thicke
- Cake
- Dionne Warwick
- Robert Randolph & The Family Band
- River City Extension
- Electrik Red
- Faction
- Lafayette Gilchrist
- Ms. Sara & The Help
- Beat Box
- No Second Troy
- Basshound
- Ellen Cherry
- Tim Warfield
- Los Reyes Del Ko
- Higher Hands
- The Drakes
- Gaybomb
- Lo Moda
- The Polygons
- Pie Boys Flat
- Noble Lake
- Fall Back Plan
- Tia Dae
- Balti Mare
- Jason Dove
- Nickodemus & Quantic Sun People
- Neal Conway
- David Andrew Smith
- Matt Wigler
- Deja Belle
- April Sampe
- Todd Marcus
- Needle Gun
- Salamander Wool
- Dave Fell
- Wolf Pac
- The Quartet Offensive
- Matt Davignon
- Todd Marcus Jazz Orchestra
- Cold Spring Jazz Quartet
- Bay Jazz Project
- The Dave Tieff Band
- Il Culo

=== 2008 ===
- Roberta Flack
- Ne-Yo
- The Wailers
- Rusted Root
- Joan Jett & The Blackhearts
- Gary B & the Notions
- Thrushes
- The Oranges Band
- Mike Doughty

=== 2007 ===
- Main Stage
  - The Isley Brothers
  - Los Lonely Boys
  - Lupe Fiasco
  - Keyshia Cole
  - Fertile Ground
  - Ryan Shaw
  - Burning Spear
  - Sam Bush
  - Nuttin' But Stringz
  - Shaw
- Festival Stage
  - Old 97's
- University of Baltimore Stage
  - Damsels
  - Soul'd Out
  - Wendy McIntyre
  - Fools & Horses
- DJ Culture stage
  - DJ Vadim
  - Karizma
  - Tittsworth
  - Pase Rock
  - Uncle Jesse
  - DJ Sabo with Nappy G
  - DJ Ulken with Shanta Live
  - DJ Impulse

=== 2006 ===
- Common
- Brazilian Girls
- Grace Potter & The Nocturnals
- Michael Franti
- Citizen Cope
- Randy Travis
- Jarflys

=== 2005 ===
- Morris Day and the Time
- Boyz II Men
- Q-Tip
- Shaggy
- Drive-By Truckers
- The Disco Biscuits
- Platinum Pied Pipers
- Danielia Cotton
- The Seldon Plan
- Swingin' Swamis

=== 2004 ===
- Isaac Hayes
- Wyclef Jean
- Fertile Ground
- Violent Femmes
- Tortured Soul
- De La Soul
- Arrested Development

=== 2003 ===
- Blues Traveler
- The Radiators
- The Bridge

=== 2001 ===
- Karl Denson's Tiny Universe
- The North Mississippi Allstars
- Railroad Earth
- Etta James
- Ray Charles
- Fertile Ground
- Junkyard Saints
- Carl Filipiak
- Shemekia Copeland
- Smokey Robinson
- Junior Brown
- O'Malley's March
- Great Big Sea
- Koko Taylor and her Blues Machine
- Hugh Masekela

=== 2000 ===
- Patti LaBelle
- O'Malley's March
- The Neville Brothers
- Tito Puente
- Dave Brubeck

=== 1999 ===
- Ashford & Simpson with poet Maya Angelou
- Earl Klugh
- Fertile Ground
- The Temptations
- Duke Ellington Orchestra
- Dionne Warwick
- The Disco Biscuits

=== 1998 ===
- Roger Daltrey and the British Rock Symphony and Choir
- Gladys Knight
- Buckwheat Zydeco
- Bela Fleck and the Flecktones
- Richard Thompson
- Stanley Jordan

=== 1997 ===
- Patti LaBelle
- KoKo Taylor
- Tito Puente
- Kelly Bell Band

=== 1995 ===
- Ethel Ennis

=== 1994 ===
- Aretha Franklin

=== 1993 ===
- Chaka Khan
- Ruben Blades (con Son Del Solar)

=== 1992 ===
- Gladys Knight
- Tammy Wynette

=== 1991 ===
- Jeffrey Osborne
- Emmylou Harris
- Hiroshima

=== 1990 ===
- Letitia Leigh
- Roberta Flack
- Chick Corea
- Buckwheat Zydeco
- Bela Fleck and the Flecktones

=== 1989 ===
- Martha Reeves and the Vandellas
- Grover Washington, Jr.
- Max Roach Quartet

=== 1987 ===
- Deanna Bogart
- Leon Redbone

=== 1986 ===
- The Chiffons
- Joan Baez
- Boys Choir of Harlem

=== 1985 ===
- Spyro Gyra
- Bo Diddley

=== 1984 ===
- Duke Ellington Orchestra
- Morgan State University Choir
- Wynton Marsalis Quintet
- Sweet Honey in the Rock

=== 1983 ===
- Taj Mahal

=== 1982 ===
- Baltimore Symphony Orchestra
- Ray Charles
- Ethel Ennis
