= Cornerstone Motorcycle Ministry =

- Website: www.cornerstonemm.com

Cornerstone Motorcycle Ministry is a Christian ministry serving the motorcycling community. It was founded in 1978 by Joseph A. Delio, M.H.S, and has been serving free meals and coffee at "The Tent" near Keene, New Hampshire, for over 30 years. This volunteer effort each year is set up on Route 9 during the Laconia Motorcycle Week events. The ministry provides bikers with free food and free coffee. During their visit, visitors are given homemade cookies with pieces of paper that say, "Need to Rap?" Every year, the organization provides people with about 10,000 to 15,000 meals and 24,000 cookies.

In addition to operating "The Tent" ministry, Cornerstone performs a biker blessing at the Cathedral of the Pines in Rindge, New Hampshire, each year on Mother's Day. This event has gathered in excess of 400 bikers at a time to have their bikes or themselves blessed by the ministers of the Cornerstone Motorcycle Ministry. This event has been taking place since 1994. Most come to have their bikes blessed to provide protection from accidents over the upcoming year.

== See also ==
- Blessing of the Bikes
- List of motorcycle clubs
