= Telesma =

American rock band

- Origin: Baltimore, Maryland, U.S.
- Genres: Psychedelic rock; world music; progressive rock; trance music
- Years active: 2002-present
- Members: Ian Hesford; Jason Sage; Joanne Juskus; Chris Mandra; Bryan "Jonesy" Jones; Mike Kirby

Telesma is an American rock band formed in 2002 in Baltimore, Maryland. They approach different genres such as psychedelic rock, world music, progressive rock, and trance music.

A "telesma" is either a talisman or the energy with which a talisman is charged. The band often performs at festivals and other venues across the country, mostly in the Eastern half of the United States.

== Current performers ==
- Ian Hesford (didgeridoo, kubing, dumbek, percussion)
- Jason Sage (keyboards, vocals, percussion, programmer)
- Joanne Juskus (vocals, percussion, karatalas)
- Chris Mandra (guitar, analog guitar synth, the manDrum, and vocals)
- Bryan "Jonesy" Jones (6 string MIDI & upright basses, theremin, percussion)
- Mike Kirby (drum kit, percussion, electronic drums)

Additional artists/performers:

- Indra Lazul (belly dancers)
- Patricia Tamariz (body painter)
- Adam Scott Miller (visual artist)
- Alex & Allyson Grey (visual artist)
- Jeremy Opio (visual artist)

== Biography ==
Telesma's sound, often labeled “electro-acoustic psychedelic world dance music”, is driven by the ancient sound of the didgeridoo, the kubing (bamboo mouth harp), tribal drums and percussion, and the human voice. The group's work include albums “O(h)M” (2007), “Hearing Visions: Live” (2009), “Action In Inaction” (2012), and five song EP “Decade Dance” (2014) all released on their independent label “Strangely Compelling Music”.

Ian Hesford died Feb 13, 2026

== Collaborations ==
Telesma has collaborated with several other artists. They co-created the 2008 Visionary Gathering in Baltimore with Alex Grey, releasing a CD and DVD of the event entitled Hearing Visions: Live, and worked on other projects with him at The Chapel of Sacred Mirrors (CoSM).

From 2010–present, Telesma collaborated with visual artist Adam Scott Miller on creating video content for their live projection show. As well as having Adam paint live with the band on several occasions. In 2012, Adam created the "LOTUS-CHAIN" video project which includes 3 videos for the Telesma songs "Chain", "White Lotus" and a 3rd song TBA.

Other artists that Telesma has performed with include Shpongle, Beats Antique, EOTO, Papadosio, Consider The Source, David Tipper, ArcheDream For Human-Kind, Delhi2Dublin, Woodland, Bernie Worrell, Cyro Baptista & Beat the Donkey, See-I (featuring members of Thievery Corporation), Faun, Eliot Lipp, Jim Donovan (Rusted Root), The Gypsy Nomads, and HuDost.

== Venues ==
Some of the event venues Telesma has performed at include: Camp Bisco, Levitt Pavilion SteelStacks, Artscape, the Starwood Festival, Faerieworlds, PEX Summerfest, Spoutwood Fairie Festival, EvolveFest, FaerieCon, Raw Spirit Gathering, Culturefest, Karmafest, Maryland Faerie Festival, Alex Grey's Chapel of Sacred Mirrors (CoSM), Free Spirit Gathering, Primal Arts Festival, the Baltimore PowWow, Phanphest, SoWeBo Festival, Nelson's Ledges, and WIYY 98Rock’s Summer Concert Series.

== Discography ==
- 2007 - O(h)M
- 2008 - Hearing Visions: Live
- 2012 - Action/in/Inaction
- 2014 - "Decade Dance"

== Filmography ==
- 2008 - Hearing Visions: Live DVD
