= Norman Hyde =

British motorcycle development engineer

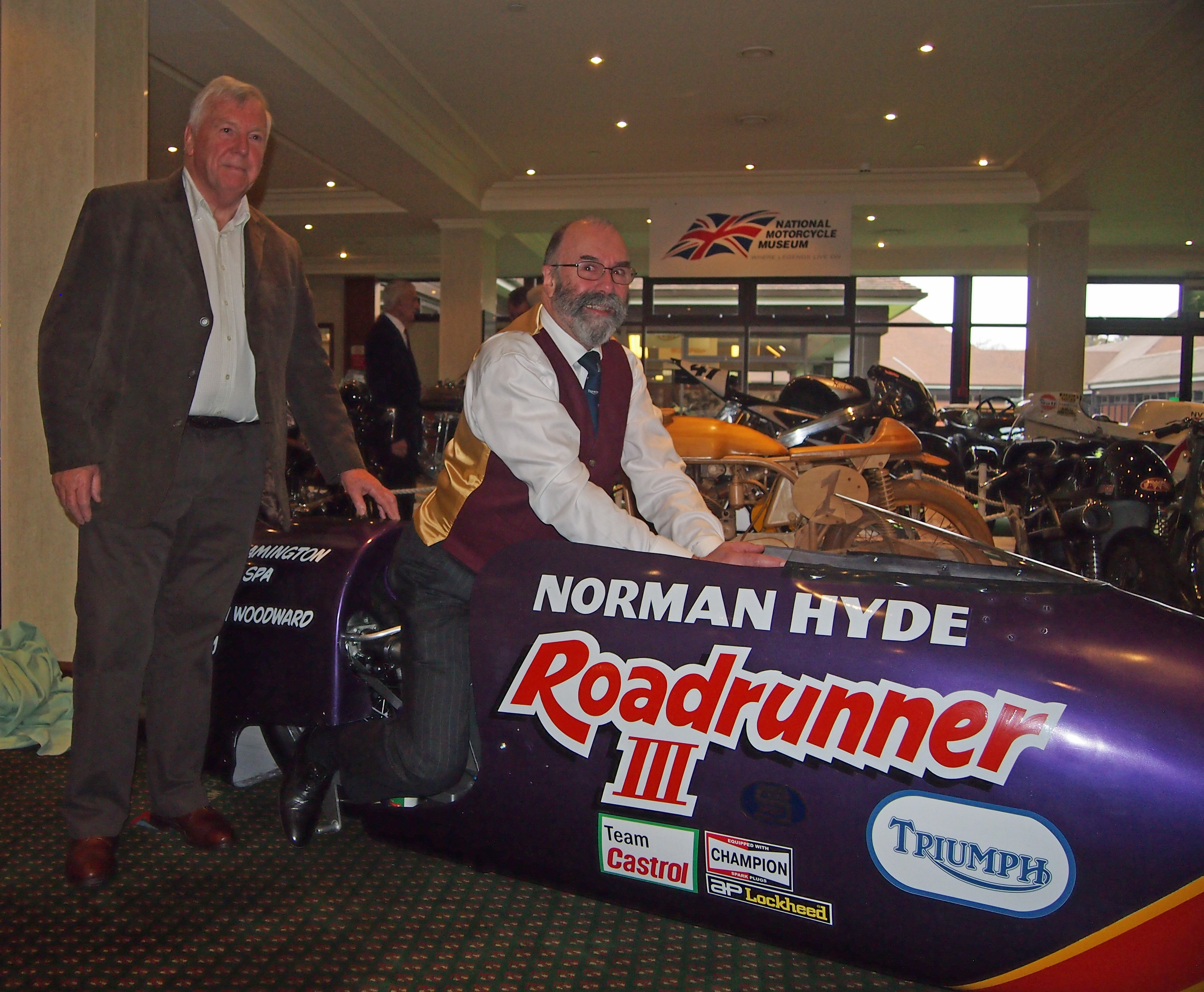
Norman Hyde on his Roadrunner sidecar outfit at the National Motorcycle Museum

Norman Hyde (born February 1945) is a British motorcycle development engineer, racer, and world record holder.

Hyde joined Triumph motorcycles as an apprentice in 1964. Following the factory closure at Meriden in 1973, Hyde moved to the Kitts Green site run by Norton Triumph International. When that shut down in 1975, he used his redundancy payment to establish his own business, designing and selling performance parts for Triumph twins and triples. Having passed his mechanical engineering diploma with flying colors in 1968, Hyde secured a position in Triumph’s racing development department, working under Doug Hele, the legendary Chief Development Engineer. As a result, Hyde was directly involved in the development of the T120, T140, T150, T160, and T180 twins and triples, as well as projects that never made it into production, like the four-cylinder Quadrant, OHC Triple, and 350cc Bandit twin. He and his colleagues supported the factory’s racers, including Percy Tait. Hyde is particularly proud of the Triumph Trident triple, launched in 1969, which, along with the Honda 750/4, redefined the sports bike sector of that era.

Hyde also used his engineering skills to compete in drag racing and sprinting. In 1968, he took the World Record for a standing start 1/4 mile in his Triumph 350cc sidecar outfit, and in 1969, he beat the World Record for a standing start kilometre on a Triumph 500cc twin (set by the works Gilera two years previously). In 1972, Hyde captured the World Sidecar Land Speed Record on his Roadrunner III 850cc Triumph Trident powered outfit, at an average speed of 161.8 mph, a record that remained unbeaten for over 35 years.

Having started his own performance parts business early in 1976, Hyde used his engineering experience to design his bikes, and in 1987 he introduced the Hyde Harrier, a café racer kit for Bonneville and Trident engines using a frame developed with Harris Performance in Hertfordshire. This was followed up in 1995 by the Hornet, a 126-mph single-cylinder motorcycle, also Harris-framed, powered by 600cc Rotax engines tuned to produce 70 bhp. Following the rebirth of Triumph at their new Hinckley factory and the introduction of the retro-styled Bonneville, Hyde introduced a wide range of performance and styling parts for the new British twins.

Hyde retired in 2018 and was recognized for his contribution to the British motorcycle industry by the Triumph Owners Motor Cycle Club, who appointed him their patron.

== Bibliography ==
- "Norman Hyde – retiring but not shy". britishdealernews.co.uk. 7 September 2018.
- "Norman clocks up 50 years on bikes". Warwick Courier.
