= Found poetry =

Poetry discovered in accidental sources

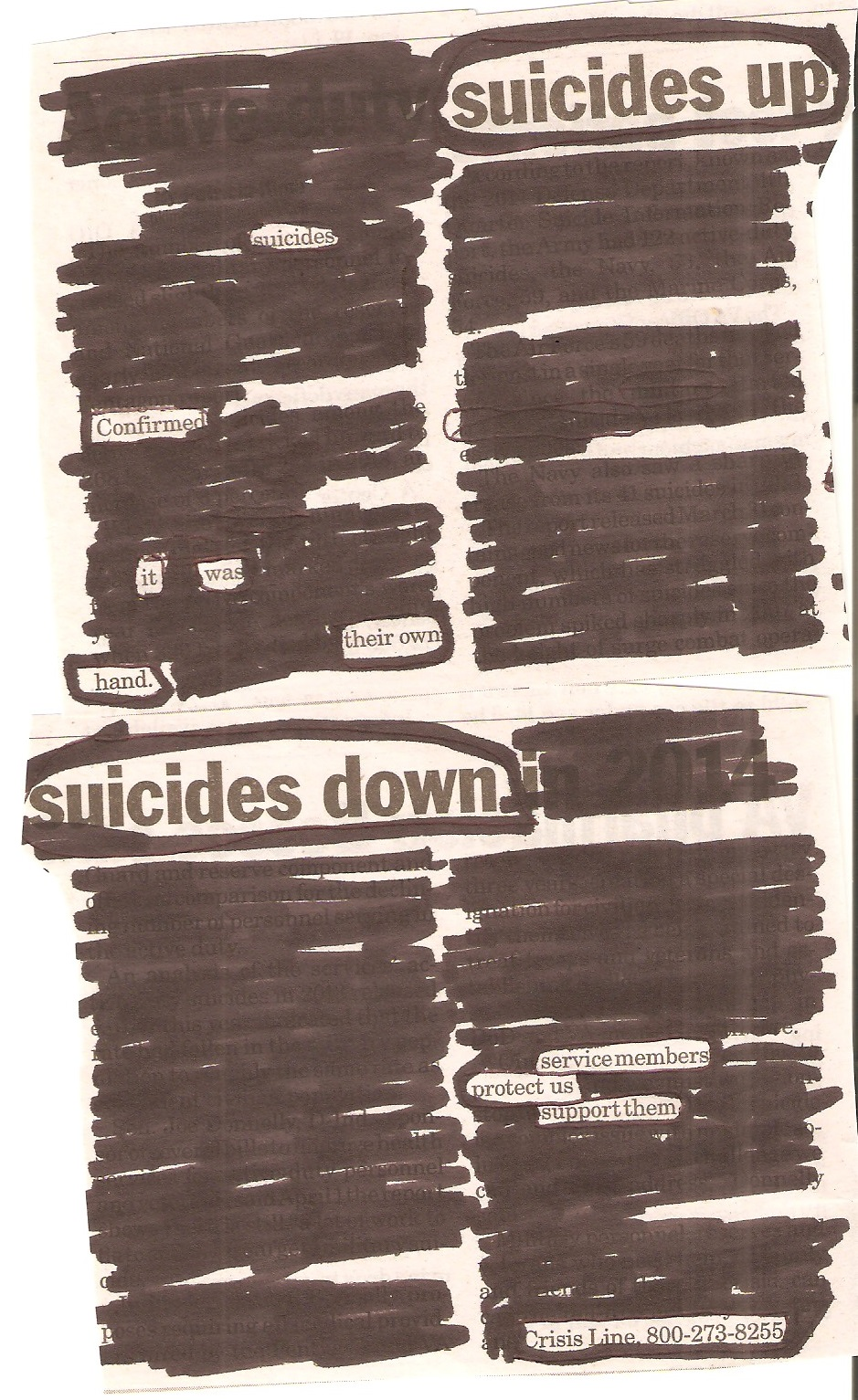
A piece of blackout poetry, created by blocking out words from a piece of newsprint

Found poetry is a type of poetry created by taking words, phrases, and sometimes whole passages from other sources and reframing them (a literary equivalent of a collage) by making changes in spacing and lines, or by adding or deleting text, thus imparting new meaning. The resulting poem can be defined as treated: changed in a profound and systematic manner; or untreated: virtually unchanged from the order, syntax and meaning of the poem.

== Concepts ==
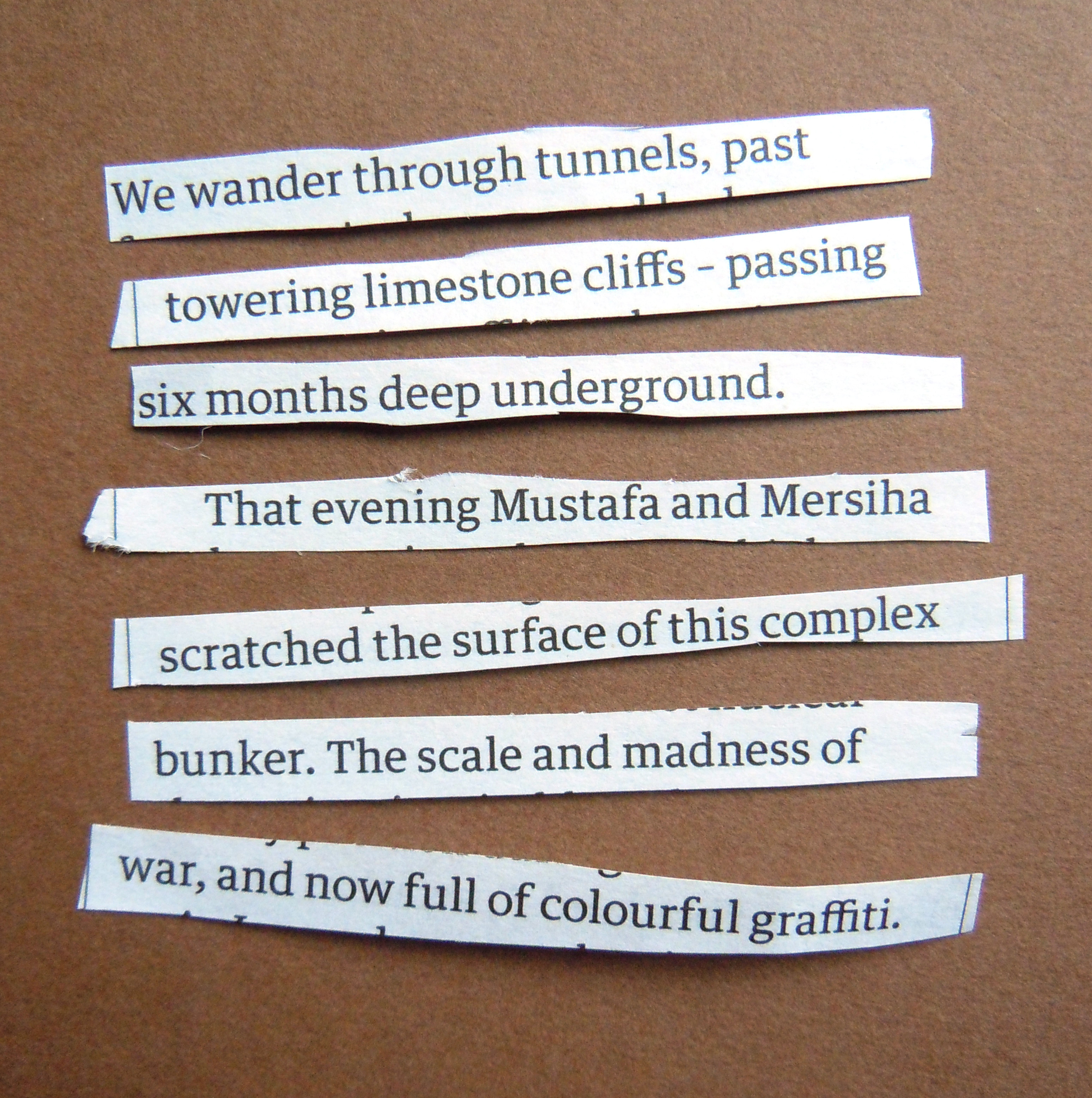
A cut-up text created from lines of a newspaper article about tourism

The concept of found poetry is closely connected to the revision of the concept of authorship in the 20th century (as John Hollander put it, "anyone may 'find' a text; the poet is he who names it, 'Text'"). See Charles Reznikoff's Testimony, whose source material was courtroom testimonies from the Gilded Age, and whose many iterations were aimed at debunking a national U.S. narrative that denied the country's violent, discriminatory past.

Types of common forms and practices of found poetry include free form excerpting and remixing, erasure, cento and cut-up.

== Comparisons and predecessors ==
Marquive Stenzel describes the Dadaism movement with its readymade philosophy as a predecessor for the practice that later became found poetry. Dadaists like Duchamp placed everyday practical objects in an environment that was aesthetic and in so doing called into question that object as art, the observer, the aesthetic environment and the definition of what art is.

Stylistically, found poetry is similar to the visual art of "appropriation" in which two- and three-dimensional art is created from recycled items, giving ordinary/commercial things new meaning when put within a new context in unexpected combinations or juxtapositions.

== Examples ==
An example of found poetry appeared in William Whewell's "An Elementary Treatise on Mechanics":

Hence no force, however great,
can stretch a cord, however fine,
into an horizontal line
which is accurately straight.

In 1972, Bern Porter published Found Poems via Something Else Press. It features hundreds of found poems selected from newspapers, ads and everyday printed matter, some involving collage techniques, others displayed as readymades.

In 2003, Slate writer Hart Seely found poetry in the speeches and news briefings of Donald Rumsfeld. In a transcript of a Department of Defense news briefing from February 12, 2002, Rumsfeld ruminated on "The Unknown":

As we know,
There are known knowns.
There are things we know we know.

We also know
There are known unknowns.
That is to say
We know there are some things
We do not know.

But there are also unknown unknowns,
The ones we don't know
We don't know.

Hart Seely published Rumsfeld's poetry in the book, Pieces of Intelligence: The Existential Poetry of Donald H. Rumsfeld (2003). American composer Phil Kline set Rumsfeld's lyrics to music in "Rumsfeld's Songs", a song cycle released on Zippo Songs (2004). Pianist Bryant Kong also used Rumsfeld's lyrics on his release "Poetry of Donald Rumsfeld".

In 2009, on The Tonight Show with Conan O'Brien, the talk show host twice asked actor William Shatner to deliver the written words of former Alaskan Governor and Vice-Presidential nominee Sarah Palin in the style of beat poetry. Shatner performed Palin's farewell speech on July 27, and several of her tweets on July 29. Shatner was supported by a bongo player and contrabassist.

Another well-known example of a public figure's speech being converted into found poetry was the baseball play calls of Phil Rizzuto. Rizzuto was the announcer for the New York Yankees baseball team for some 40 years, and some of his at times rambling or disjointed commentary was collected and reformatted by Hart Seely and Tom Peyer into a collection of Rizzuto's found poetry. An example is Rizzuto's thoughts on the death of Yankees catcher Thurmon Munson in an airplane crash:

"The Man in the Moon"

The Yankees have had a traumatic four days.
Actually five days.
That terrible crash with Thurman Munson.
To go through all that agony,
And then today,
You and I along with the rest of the team
Flew to Canton for the services,
And the family...
Very upset.

You know, it might,
It might sound a little corny.
But we have the most beautiful full moon tonight.
And the crowd,
Enjoying whatever is going on right now.
They say it might sound corny,
But to me it's like some kind of a,
Like an omen.

Both the moon and Thurman Munson,
Both ascending up into heaven.
I just can't get it out of my mind.
I just saw the full moon,
And it just reminded me of Thurman Munson,
And that's it.

The website Verbatim Poetry has been publishing found poems weekly since March 2009. It emphasizes the poetry found in ordinary places, and employs traditional poetic forms such as the Shakespearean sonnet as well as free verse. As of November 2023, it is not accepting submissions.

The Internet's first formal literary journal devoted to found poetry, The Found Poetry Review, debuted in 2011. The quarterly journal featured traditional centos and poems taken from textbooks, Marcel Duchamp paintings, Charles Manson's trial testimony, AOL search data, Emily Post's etiquette books, Wikipedia articles, Strunk and White's The Elements of Style, Wonder Woman comics and more. It is no longer on the web as of 2024.

Unlost Journal is a biannual online journal that publishes found poetry and collage and other visual art based on found sources.

Comedian Dave Gorman frequently creates comical found poems using bizarre or humorous comments that people have left in the comment sections of online news websites on his Dave series Dave Gorman: Modern Life Is Goodish.

In a literary critic Galina Rymbu's opinion, «Bot Conversation» of Yuri Rydkin is written in the genre of found poetry. His work are screenshots of artistic dialogue with virtual interlocutor.

== See also ==
- Dictionary Stories
- Found object
