= Slaves of the Shinar =

Novel by Justin Allen

- First edition cover
- Author: Justin Allen
- Language: English
- Genre: Historical fantasy, Heroic fantasy
- Publisher: Overlook Press
- Publication date: November 2006
- Publication place: United States
- Media type: Print (Hardback & Paperback); Audio
- Pages: 429 (original hardcover)
- ISBN: 978-1-58567-916-4 (original hardcover)
- OCLC: 124972272

Slaves of the Shinar is a historical fantasy novel that was written by Justin Allen and published in 2007. The book explores the early lives and origins of characters and peoples to be found in Middle Eastern myths and religious texts, especially the Biblical Book of Genesis and the Epic of Gilgamesh. Included from Genesis are depictions of the Nephilim (called Niphilim in the book), Jared (grandfather of Methuselah), Lamech (father of Noah) and Adah (wife of Lamech).
