= Ronald Johnson (poet) =

American poet (1935–1998)

- Born: 25 November 1935; Ashland, Kansas, United States
- Died: 4 March 1998 (aged 62); Topeka, Kansas, United States
- Education: Columbia University
- Occupation: Poet
- Writing career
- Genres: Modernism, Concrete Poetry, Erasure Poetry

Ronald Johnson (November 25, 1935 – March 4, 1998) was a poet from Ashland, Kansas, United States, whose significant works include a number of experimental long poems such as The Book of the Green Man, RADI OS, and his magnum opus ARK. Johnson graduated from Columbia University in 1960, wandered in Appalachia and the United Kingdom for a number of years, then settled in San Francisco for twenty-five years before returning to Kansas, where he died. Writer and critic Guy Davenport once referred to Johnson as America's greatest living poet, while poet Robert Creeley considered Johnson as "one of the defining peers of [his] own imagined company of poets."

== Biography ==
=== Early life and education ===
Johnson was born in Ashland, Kansas on November 25, 1935, and attended University of Kansas and Columbia University, where he got his B.A. However, Johnson stated in an interview with Peter O'Leary that his true literary education took place off campus in the Cedar Tavern, a regular haunt of Black Mountain-associated artists.

=== San Francisco ===
Johnson moved from Kansas to San Francisco, where he lived for twenty-five years. There, he was active in the San Francisco gay community in Bear culture and was a co-founder of the Rainbow Motorcycle Club.

== Literary career ==
At the beginning of his career, Johnson was introduced to a number of experimental poets associated with Black Mountain School by his partner and fellow poet Jonathan Williams. Johnson's interest in experimental verse would later branch into the innovative methods of erasure poetry and concrete poetry.

Johnson's first collection A Line of Poetry, A Row of Trees was published in 1964 by Jargon Press, bearing a dedication to Charles Olson. This collection demonstrates Johnson's early use of collage, stitching together quotations from Samuel Palmer, Henry David Thoreau, and Ralph Waldo Emerson with Johnson's own original composition.

Johnson's book-length poem The Book of the Green Man, was written following an extended walking tour made by Johnson, and his partner and fellow poet Jonathan Williams, to the British countryside in 1962. Johnson stated that the composition of The Book of the Green Man stemmed from his efforts "as a brash American, to make new the traditional British long seasonal poem." The poem, which is interspersed with Johnson's lucid descriptions of the natural world, makes equal use of quotations from a variety of sources ranging form works of Romantic poets to nineteenth-century ecological journals.

Johnson suggests the relation of his collage method to the poem's narrative of rejuvenation, stating that its extensive quotations form a "humus for new literatures to spring in." The poem has been compared by Johnson to Basil Bunting's Briggflatts and T.S. Eliot's The Waste Land. Johnson's use of fragmentation, collage, and his complication and dispersal of the lyric "I" justify his placement of The Book of the Green Man in the tradition of the modernist long poem.

Johnson's book-length poem RADI OS (Sand Dollar Press, 1977) is an early and influential example of erasure poetry. He wrote it by blacking out words in a copy of John Milton's Paradise Lost. Johnson rewrote the first four books of Milton's poem in this way, producing a new text in which the few remaining words float in the white page space left by the absent words. Although Johnson apparently considered RADI OS to be a section of his long poem ARK, it was not included in any edition of that poem. RADI OS was reprinted by Flood Editions in 2005.

Johnson began his major long poem ARK in 1970, which took him twenty years to complete. The poem follows in the tradition of the "American epic", a heritage once described as "that strange, amorphous, anomalous, self-contradictory thing". This mythology of an ambitious and protean epic project – inspired by Walt Whitman's Leaves of Grass – was continued into the 20th century by Gertrude Stein's Stanzas in Meditation, H.D.'s Helen in Egypt, Ezra Pound's The Cantos, Louis Zukofsky's "A", William Carlos Williams' Paterson, Charles Olson's The Maximus Poems, and Robert Duncan's Passages.

Like these works, Johnson wrote ARK over long stretches of time. It became a lifetime "preoccupation" and "the poem of a life". However, Johnson's point of divergence from his predecessors hinged upon his decision to discard the Poundian notion of the long poem as a 'poem containing history,' and to 'start all over again,' constructing ARK based on the influence and structural guidance of architecture. Johnson drew particular inspiration from the folk art accomplishments of Le Facteur Cheval's Palais Ideal, and Simon Rodia's Watts Towers. Johnson viewed his poem as a 'structure rather than a diatribe, artefact rather than argument.' Unconcerned with linear narrative, ARK achieves its form by the erection of shafts and pillars of language and music. The poem is constructed of three sections, each of thirty-three parts, titled: "The Foundations," "The Spires" and "The Ramparts."

Johnson was also a well-regarded cookbook author, including "The Aficionado's Southwestern Cooking" (1985) and "The American Table" (1984).

Johnson's last book, The Shrubberies, was published in 2001 and, according to the critic Stephanie Burt, "showed a poet no less spiritual than the author of ARK but also one given to extreme concision." Soon after ARK returned to print in a new edition, Burt contributed an extended appreciation of Johnson's magnum opus to the pages of The New Yorker.

Ronald Johnson, described by Guy Davenport as America's greatest living poet, died at his father's home in Topeka, Kansas on March 4, 1998.

== Selected bibliography ==
- A Line of Poetry, A Row of Trees (Highlands, NC: Jargon Press, 1964)
- The Book of the Green Man (Norton, 1967; with an afterword by Ross Hair, Axminster: Uniformbooks, 2015)
- Valley of the Many-Colored Grasses. (New York: W. W. Norton, 1969; The Song Cave, 2023)
- RADI OS I–IV. (Berkeley: Sand Dollar Press, 1977; Chicago: Flood Editions, 2005)
- ARK: The Foundations 1–33 (North Point, 1980)
- ARK 50: Spires 34–50 (Dutton, 1984)
- To Do As Adam Did: Selected Poems of Ronald Johnson, edited with an introduction by Peter O'Leary. (Talisman House, Jersey City, 2000)
- ARK, (Albuquerque: Living Batch, 1996; Chicago: Flood Editions, 2013)
- The Shrubberies, ed. Peter O'Leary (Chicago: Flood Editions, 2001)

== Legacy ==
On May 25, 2005, a memorial plaque was unveiled in Johnson's memory at the Ward-Meade Park in Topeka, Kansas. The ceremony included a mini-symposium on the subject of his poetry accompanied by food prepared from his cookbooks. In 2017, the contribution of Johnson and several others to San Francisco's Gay and Leather culture was honoured by the unveiling of bronze bootprints bearing their names. This commemorative work was completed as part of San Francisco South of Market Leather History Alley.
