= Nicole Sealey =

American poet (born 1979)

- Born: 1979 (age 46–47); St. Thomas, Virgin Islands
- Education: University of South Florida (MLA in Africana studies); New York University (MFA in creative writing)
- Occupation: Poet
- Notable work: The Animal After Whom Other Animals are Named "Pages 22–29, an excerpt from The Ferguson Report: An Erasure"
- Awards: 2021 Forward Prize for Best Single Poem

Nicole Sealey (born 1979) is an American poet who was born in St. Thomas, Virgin Islands, and raised in Apopka, Florida, US. She is the former executive director of Cave Canem Foundation. She won the 2015 Drinking Gourd Chapbook Poetry Prize for The Animal After Whom Other Animals Are Named, and her collection Ordinary Beast was a finalist for the 2018 PEN Open Book Award. Her poem "Pages 22–29, an excerpt from The Ferguson Report: An Erasure" (Poetry London) won a Forward Prize for Poetry in October 2021. Her book The Ferguson Report: An Erasure won the OCM Bocas Prize for Caribbean Poetry, and was a finalist for the NAACP Image Award. Sealey lives in Brooklyn, New York.

== Background ==
Born in St. Thomas, Virgin Islands, Sealey was raised in Apopka, Florida, and received an MLA in Africana studies from the University of South Florida. After participating from 2005 to 2010 in Cave Canem Foundation workshops led by poets such as Marilyn Nelson, Willie Perdomo and Patricia Smith, Sealey decided at the age of 32 to commit to a career as a poet, going on to earn an MFA degree in creative writing at New York University. Her work has appeared in The Best American Poetry 2018 and 2021, The New Yorker, The Paris Review, and other publications.

She has received fellowships and awards including from CantoMundo, the Cave Canem Foundation, the American Academy in Rome, the New York Foundation for the Arts, and the Elizabeth George Foundation. In 2019, she was named a 2019–2020 Hodder Fellow at Princeton University. From 2017 to 2019 she was the Executive Director at the Cave Canem Foundation, and was the curator for a special series of Poem-a-Day (August 31–September 11, 2020).

Sealey began making erasures from the 2015 United States Department of Justice report detailing bias policing and court practices in Ferguson, Missouri, three years after the fatal shooting of Michael Brown by police, and in October 2021, her "Pages 22–29, an excerpt from The Ferguson Report: An Erasure" (published in Poetry London) won the 2021 Forward Prize for Best Single Poem. The judges of the prize referred to Sealey's use of the report's "stifling obfuscations" to create "new moments of lyrical beauty and contemplation", and called her work "a poem of resonant cultural and social value".

== Bibliography ==
- The Animal After Whom Other Animals are Named: Poems (Northwestern University Press, 2016, ISBN 9780810133129)
- Ordinary Beast: Poems (Ecco Press, 2017, ISBN 978-0062688811)
- The Ferguson Report: An Erasure (Knopf, 2023-08-15, ISBN 978-0593535998)
