= Jewish Motorcyclists Alliance =

Umbrella organization for motorcycle clubs

- Abbreviation: JMA
- Founded: 2004
- Founder: Ken Shapiro (inactive) and Scott Wynn
- Purpose: Motorcycle club umbrella group
- Region served: Worldwide
- Members: 2,500
- President: Steven Aresty
- Key people: Daniel Herbst (VP), Lauren Secular (Treasurer), Jay Mandelker (Secretary), Bob Cohen (Previous President), Ris Gilad (Programming), Jake Simon (Communications), Len Suckle (Webmaster), Jeff Komrower (Club Council Chair)

Jewish Motorcyclists Alliance (JMA) is an umbrella organization of Jewish motorcycle clubs. The JMA's affiliate clubs consist of independent motorcycle riding clubs with JMA membership criteria. A member club designates a representative to serve on the JMA Council.

The JMA is the home of Jewish motorcyclists from around the world. The JMA is an association of Jewish motorcycle clubs that upon its formation included organized groups in the United States, Canada, Israel, England and Australia, representing over 2,500 Jewish motorcycle enthusiasts. The common thread is the religion; however membership or admittance to the member clubs is not dictated by faith or brand of motorcycle: riders of any denomination or brand of bike are welcome.

== History ==
A meeting was set up by King Ken of the Semites On Bikes and Scott Wynn of the Chai Riders. The original meeting took place at Mike's Famous Harley Davidson in Delaware on October 3, 2004. Several bike clubs attended the meeting which had a total of 69 bikes and about 100 people. Although it was planned as just a "Meet and Greet", from that meeting grew the concept of the first Ride to Remember, honoring the anniversary of the freedom from the death camps in Europe. The Ride to Remember took place in Washington, DC, in May 2005 under the auspices of the newly named Jewish Motorcyclists Alliance (JMA). Five of the six original clubs were the founding members of the JMA. The founding member clubs were Chai Riders, Hillel's Angels, King David Bikers, Tribe (Washington D.C.), and Yidden On Wheels.

At that time, JMA had a name and people got together under the label, but there was no formal organization. During the early part of 2006, six new clubs joined the original five, with the addition of Tribe MC (Seattle) The Sabra Riders (Atlanta), The Chai Riders (Detroit), The Chaiway Riders (Chicago), Or Tikva (Chicago), and YOW (Australia). The JMA also became formally organized: a Charter & By-laws were instituted so that conduct of JMA business for current and future members would be guided by rules. To date, there are 44 registered clubs affiliated with the JMA and several more in the planning stage.

=== Ride to Remember ===
The Ride to Remember (R2R) has become the de facto defining event for the JMA and will occur annually at a venue to be selected by the JMA’s governing council. In addition to the Ride to Remember, get togethers known as "Meet and Greets" are often held throughout the year and sponsored by host clubs.

R2R 2006 was held in Whitwell, TN, to honor the staff and students of its middle school for their efforts in the Paper Clips Project. R2R 2007 was held in New York City in May 2007. In May 2008, the Jewish Motorcyclists Alliance rode its motorcycles to Omaha, Nebraska for the "Illuminating the Past to Protect the Future" event in support of the Heartland Holocaust Education Fund (HHEF). 2009 R2R enjoyed 215 attendees who, through their collective efforts, raised $57,000 for the Holocaust Research and Lending Library in Savannah and The Remember Project in Charleston. The 2010 Ride to Remember took place in Chicago/Skokie on June 10–13 and followed the route of the Skokie Nazi March 1977, ending at the Illinois Holocaust Museum. Several different JMA affiliated bike clubs have hosted the annual Ride 2 Remember. So far those cities are:

- 2006 in Whitwell, Tennessee
- 2007 in New York, New York
- 2008 in Omaha, Nebraska
- 2009 in Charleston, South Carolina
- 2010 in Chicago, Illinois
- 2011 in Virginia Beach, Virginia
- 2012 in Toronto, Ontario, Canada
- 2013 in Orange County, California
- 2014 in Oswego, New York
- 2015 in Nashville, Tennessee
- 2016 in Birmingham, Alabama
- 2017 in Providence, Rhode Island
- 2018 in Cleveland, Ohio
- 2019 in St. Louis, Missouri
- 2020 None held due to COVID-19 pandemic
- 2021 None held due to COVID-19 pandemic
- 2022 in San Diego, California
- 2023 in Milwaukee, Wisconsin (Harley Davidson's 120th Anniversary)
- 2024 in Toronto, Ontario, Canada
- 2025 in Charlotte, North Carolina
- 2026 in Cleveland, Ohio
- 2027 to be held in Boston, Massachusetts

== Philosophy ==
"As individuals, we share the fundamental passion to ride motorcycles, but we are drawn to each of our own clubs by our common faith and heritage as members of the Jewish faith.

The common thread is our religion, regardless of the degree and manner in which we choose to observe the Jewish faith. The admission of a prospective club for membership into the JMA is not predicated upon the degree to which the members of a Jewish club observe or practices the Jewish faith, or by the brands of motorcycles that its members may ride."

== Mission ==
The mission of the Jewish Motorcyclists Alliance, is to create a global environment whereby members of the Jewish faith who ride motorcycles can congregate to share and exchange ideas and opinions about matters of concern to the Jewish community at large, as well as issues specifically concerning motorcycles and motorcycle riding. The JMA is a 501c3 organization and has raised thousands of dollars to support Holocaust remembrance and education efforts throughout North America.

== See also ==
- List of motorcycle clubs
