= Hyde Harrier =

British sports motorcycle

The Hyde Harrier is a British sports motorcycle designed by Norman Hyde and unveiled at the British motorcycle show in 1987. It used donor engines from the Meriden Triumph Bonneville twin or Triumph Trident triple and a frame developed by Harris Performance, along with performance brakes by AP Lockheed and Dymag wheels.

Following the closure of the Triumph co-operative at Meriden and introduction of the Triumph Motorcycles Ltd factory at Hinckley, Hyde updated his original design to create the Harrier Jubilee, using the Hinckley Bonneville pre-EFI engine which was launched at Motorcycle Live in 2008.

Hyde Harrier Classic chassis-kits are available for Triumph Trident/BSA Rocket 3 and BSA A65 engines and require many donor and replacement components to complete the builds.

Hyde resurrected the Harrier name, it having been used in the late 1970s by the Clapham, London motorcycle business Mocheck with their Mocheck Harrier, a high-performance Honda, based on the CB400F with a 460 cc Yoshimura big-bore kit and race-styled accessories.
