= Cycle Queens of America =

- Founded: 1958
- Type: AMA chartered corporation
- Purpose: Women's Motorcycle Club
- Region served: USA

The Cycle Queens of America is a women's motorcycle club founded by Margaret Bonham of Washington, DC and Delores Davis of Philadelphia in 1958 after she was excluded from the then all White women's motorcycle club called the Motor Maids. Its members came from numerous states in the USA and its uniform was red and white. Unlike others women's clubs of the time, to clarified misconceptions of its being a "Negro club" club secretary Davis stated in 1962 that it was never a racial segregated. Cycle Queens members held field meets in New York, Pennsylvania, Illinois, Indiana, Michigan, Kentucky and Maryland and were competing in many races at the time. Members ranged from 23 to 65 years old.

The club organized field events and raise donations for charity.
