= Holy Riders =

Norwegian Christian motorcycle club

Holy Riders MC
- Founded: 1981
- Purpose: Christian motorcycle club
- Region served: Norway, Australia, Germany
- Members: 500
- Website: www.holyriders.no

Holy Riders (HR) is a Norwegian Christian motorcycle club founded in 1981. It has pr. 2008 approximately 500 members in 17 branches in Norway and is thus one of the largest motorcycle clubs in Norway. The club also has branches in Germany and Sweden. The club's goal is to spread the gospel of salvation through Jesus Christ's death and resurrection to everyone in the motorcycle community. The club is alcohol free and is open to all regardless of age, gender, or religious affiliation. The type Motorcycles members drive everything from American veteran motorcycles through Harley Davidson to Japanese bikes.

== Branches ==
The club is organized in 17 local branches in Norway, in addition to 2 branches in Sweden and 1 branch in Germany. They serve as individual departments, but is formally under central board. The different departments have their own programs throughout the year, but they all gather for HR's Gatherings, Pilgrimstreffet and Christmas party and annual meeting.

== Power ==
Power is the Holy Riders magazine and is published with 2 magazines per year. A number is approx. 20 pages.

== Coffee Tent ==
Holy Riders coffee tent has become a gathering place for many on the MC events in Norway; it distributes both coffee and bibles. . Some of the events they have been permanent on in recent years is, Norgestreffet and TrollRally. on Norgestreffet has Holy Riders also had MC worship meetings on some occasions.

== Holy Riders MC Racing ==
Holy Riders MC Racing is a racing club that aims to be active participants in the racing environment. They want to be a club that participates and contributes to a positive environment within the different branches. They also wants all within motorsport community to have the opportunity to become acquainted with Jesus.

== See also ==
- List of motorcycle clubs
- Motorcycling
