= Canadian Army Veteran Motorcycle Units =

The Canadian Army Veteran Motorcycle Units (CAV MU) is a riding club, or more precisely an organized association of military veteran motorcycle riders.

The CAV MU is composed of thousands of Canadian Army, Royal Canadian Air Force and Royal Canadian Navy veterans and still serving members of the Canadian Forces, as well as veteran motorcycle enthusiasts from the UK, Australia and US. Many members have served in regiments, bases and ships both in Canada and in overseas theatres of operations.

The CAV MU attempts to maintain the values of uniformed service; those of integrity, legitimacy, honour and strength in their veteran's duties to their community, and to keep alive the bonds formed during their military service.

CAV members ride motorcycles of different types, including cruisers, baggers, choppers, sport bikes, tricycles (more commonly referred to as trikes), touring motorcycles, and dual-sport and enduro.

== History ==
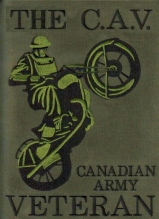

Started in 2003, two military veteran motorcyclists meeting at a local charity ride, developed an idea that a military motorcyclist organization was needed. The two co-founders, P.M. 'Trapper' Cane and J.S.Y. 'Doc' Lebrun adopted the name Canadian Army Veteran (CAV) and a WWII crest of a despatch rider as their crest, which had been used in a World War II recruiting poster in Canada. The co-founders' inspiration was the continuance of the military comradeship that brothers-in-arms experience.

Within the first five years The CAV had grown by thousands of riding military veterans and Canadian Forces (CF) from across Canada and Canada's North. Now named as Canadian Army Veteran Motorcycle Units (CAV MU) this military motorcycle organization now reflects a more national scope.

As the CAV MU grew so did the organizational requirements, although the emphasis remains on individual units.

== Fundraising and awards ==
The CAV MU, has helped raise funds for international, national and local charities, totalling in the millions of dollars. CAV was the 2007 recipient of the ICROSS Humanitarian Award.

== Formations and units ==
Due to the strong military association, instead of more typical 'chapters', the CAV is organised along military lines, into four formations comprising several units. Each unit is named after or associated with a 'battle honour'. Many units possess a membership in the hundreds.

The CAV has a national headquarters and three formation headquarters (HQ). 1st CAV is based generally on central Canada, including Quebec, 2nd CAV is based on Newfoundland and Labrador and the Maritimes, and 3rd CAV on Western and Northern Canada. A fourth formation, CAV International was developed to provide units to Canadian veterans and CF members in different parts of the world.

=== Central Canada ===
- 1st CAV HQ, Manitoba, Ontario, Quebec
- Battle of Vimy Ridge Vimy Unit
- Battle of Amiens Unité Amiens (French)
- Operation Shingle Anzio Unit
- Korean War Unité Coreé, (French)
- Dieppe Raid Dieppe Unit
- Juno Beach Juno Unit
- Battle of Kapyong Kapyong Unit
- Battle of Normandy Normandy Unit
- Battle of Assoro Assoro Unit
- Battle of Ortona Ortona Unit
- Paardeberg Unit
- Battle of the Somme Somme Unit
- Falaise gap Falaise Unit
- Battle of Cambrai (1917) Cambrai Unit
- Hindenburg Line Hindenburg Line
- Allied invasion of Sicily Assoro Unit
- Operation Undergo Unité Calais (French)
- Operation Blockbuster Hochwald Unit
- North Russia Campaign Archangel Unit
- The Argyll and Sutherland Highlanders of Canada (Princess Louise's) BAD ZWISCHENAHN Unit
- Regalbuto Unit
- Rhineland Unit
- Sicily Unit
- St Lawrence Unit
- Verrieres Ridge Unit
- Arras Unit
- Casa Berardi Unit
- Cassino Unit
- Gulf Kuwait Unit
- Niagara Unit
- Oldenburg Unit
- Ruhr Unit (French)
- Ma sum Ghar Unit Afghanistan (French)
- Panjwai Unit Afghanistan (French)

=== Eastern Canada ===
- 2nd CAV HQ
- Battle of Passchendaele Passchendaele Unit
- Beaumont-Hamel Unit
- Battle of the Atlantic Unit
- Gothic line Unit
- Battle of Gallipoli Gallipoli Unit
- Boer War South Africa Unit
- Battle of Dunkirk Dunkirk Unit
- Fortress Europe Unit

=== Western and Northern Canada ===
- 3rd CAV HQ
- Ypres Unit
- Royal Canadian Engineers Ubique Unit
- Agira Unit
- Second Battle of Ypres Frezenberg Unit
- Gustav Line Liri Valley Unit
- Battle of the Reichswald The Reichswald Unit
- Operation Tonga Dives Crossing Unit
- Gothic Line Coriano Ridge Unit
- Battle of Britain Battle of Britain Unit
- Battle of the Scheldt Scheldt Unit
- Gothic Line Rimini Unit
- Battle for Caen Caen Unit
- Hill 70 Unit
- Mount Sorrel Unit
- The Moro River Campaign The Moro Unit
- Kosovo War Kosovo Unit
- Battle of the Ancre Heights Unit
- Second Battle of Ypres Gravenstafel Unit

=== C.A.V. International ===
- UK
- Europe
- US
- Middle East

== See also ==
- Motorcycling
- Types of motorcycle
- Motorcycle club
- List of motorcycle clubs
- List of veterans organizations
- Royal Canadian Legion
- International Community for the Relief of Suffering and Starvation
