= Untouchables Motorcycle Club =

Motorcycle club

- Nickname: The Original Black and Orange
- Formation: September 1, 2000
- Founder: Todd Cliborne Jeff Matson
- Founded at: Gary, Indiana
- Type: 501(c)(3) registered
- Headquarters: Northwest Indiana
- Region served: United States
- Affiliations: None
- Website: www.untouchablesmc.org

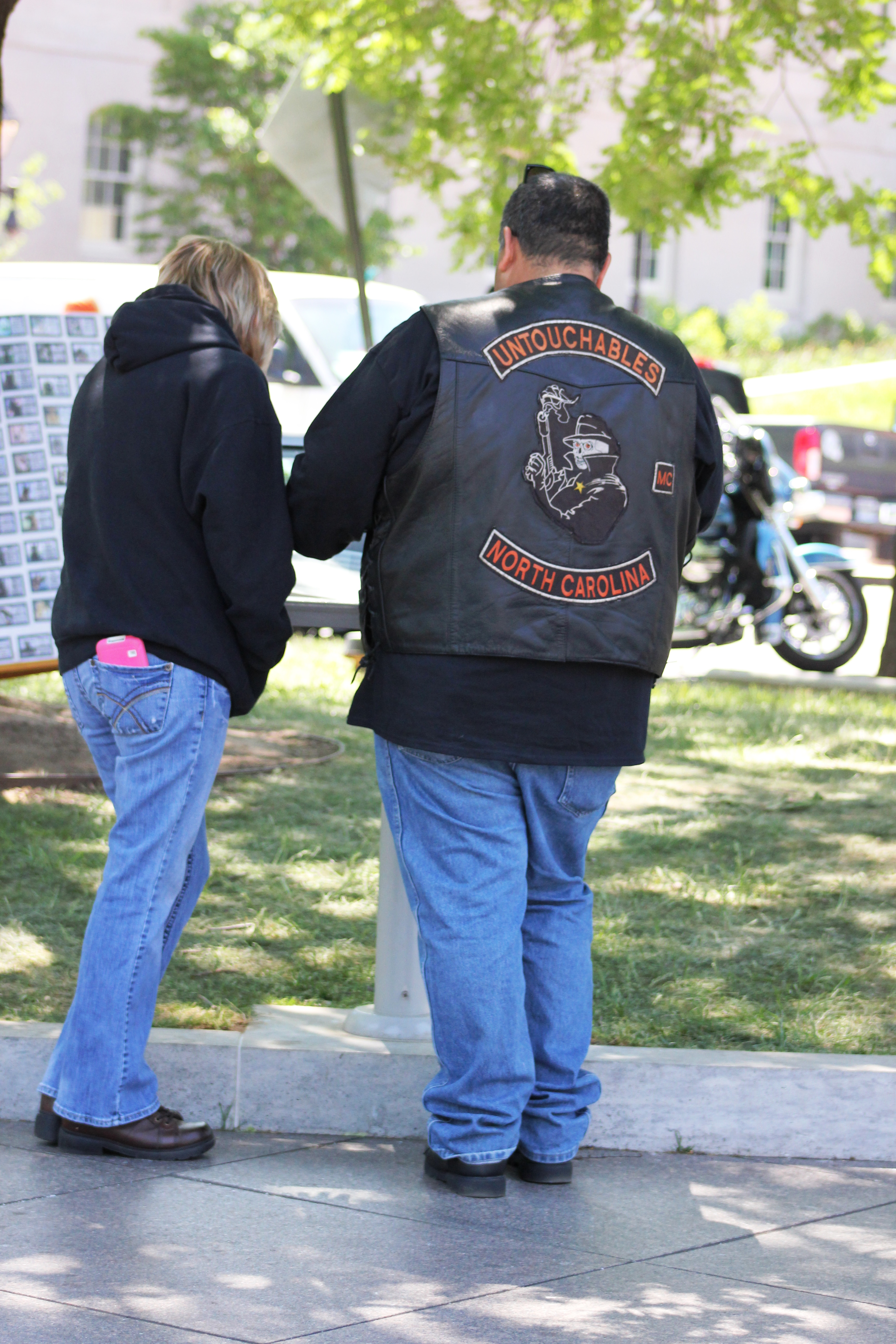
Untouchables Motorcycle Club member

The Untouchables Motorcycle Club (UMC) is a national motorcycle club founded in Gary, Indiana on September 1, 2000. The club's membership consists of active and retired federal, state, and local law enforcement officers, and provides support to the families of officers killed, injured, or those facing unexpected health or financial difficulties. The club operates chapters throughout the United States from California to New York.

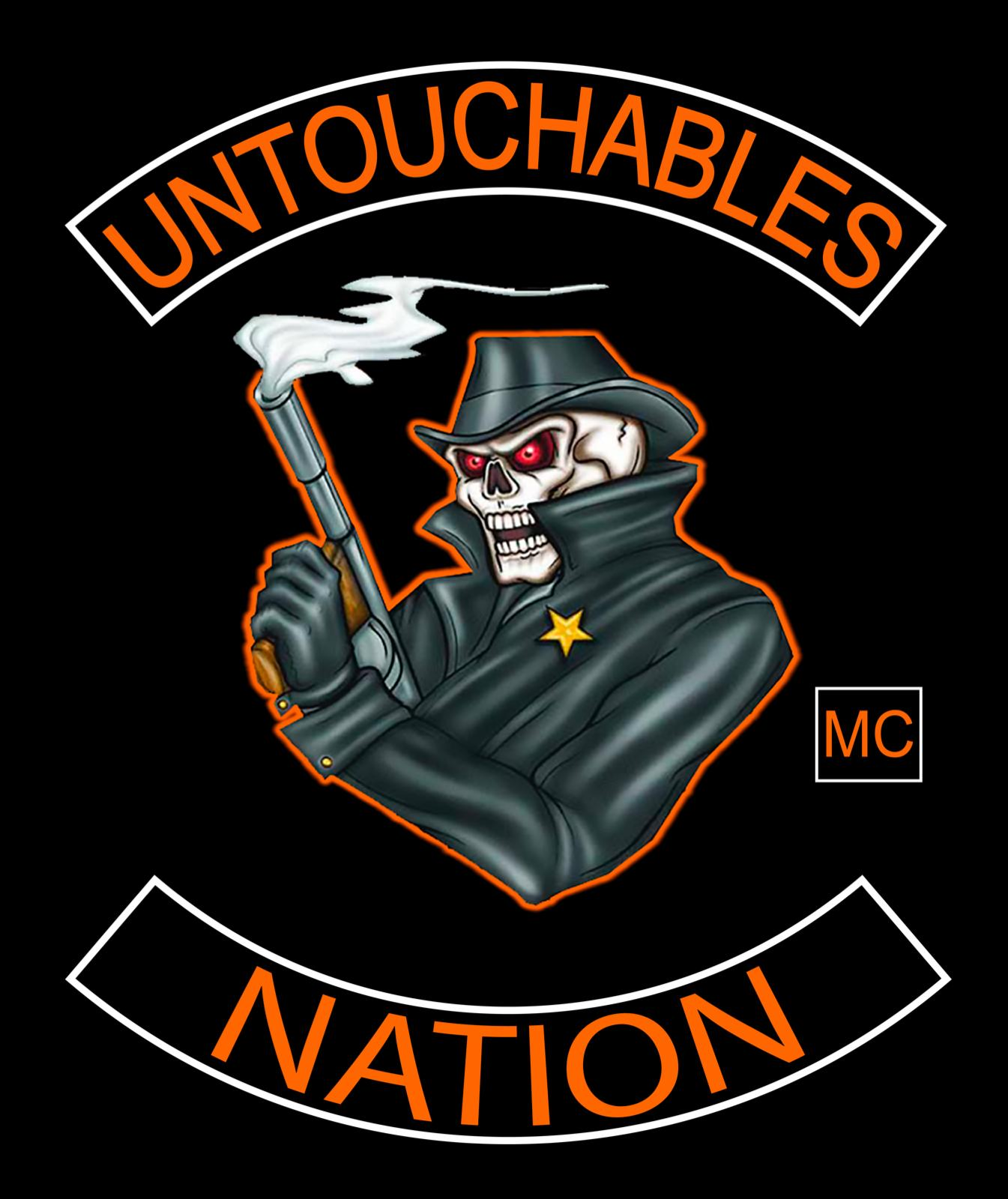
Untouchables Motorcycle Club back patch

== See also ==
- List of motorcycle clubs
