= Triumph Owners Motor Cycle Club =

Triumph Owners MCC
- Abbreviation: TOMCC
- Founded: November 1949
- Founded at: London, UK
- Region served: Worldwide
- Members: Circa 6,000 (2006)
- Website: www.tomcc.org

Triumph Owners Motor Cycle Club (TOMCC) is a motorcycle club for owners of Triumph Motorcycles based in the United Kingdom. Founded in 1949 in South London, the club had expanded nationally to a membership of circa 6,000 members by 2006. The club is open to owners of Triumph Motorcycles of all ages, including those built by the latest incarnation of the company, Triumph Motorcycles Ltd in Hinckley. The club has been affiliated to the ACU and the British Motorcyclists Federation. As of 2006 it had 44 regional branches spread throughout the UK. Members are also welcome from outside of United Kingdom. Members can elect to join Head Office branch rather than any particular branch.

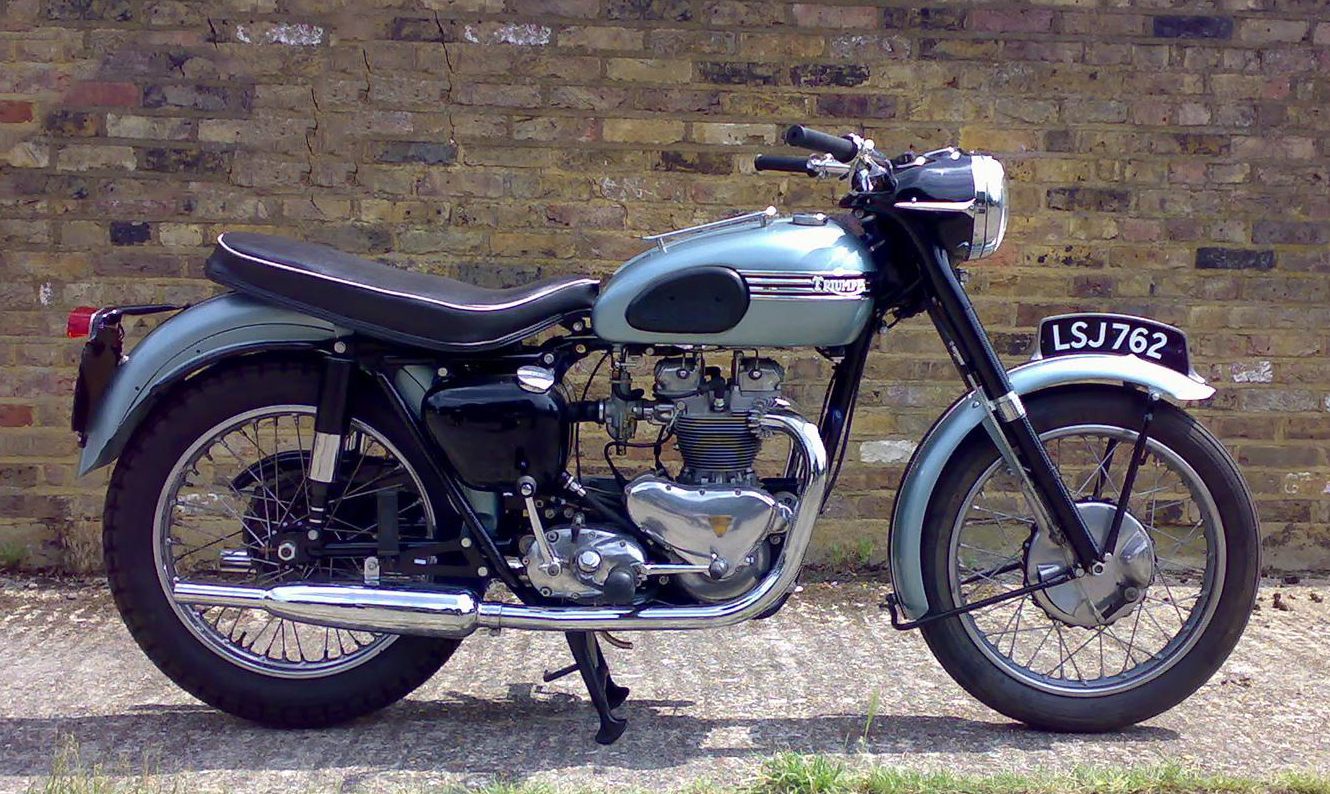
Triumph Tiger 100

The club organises social activities for members and publishes a monthly magazine called Nacelle which is dependent upon contributions from members and covers the whole spectrum of owning, riding and maintaining Triumph motorcycles from classics through to the latest models. National events (Trifest) are organised for all members to attend complementing the local regional events. The club offers a number of services, including discovery of manufacture date for individuals who wish to apply for an age related vehicle registration plate.

TOMCC is run by a group by enthusiast for enthusiasts on a volunteer basis. The club is independent from Triumph Motorcycles Ltd but there is close co-operation between them, their dealer network and TOMCC.

The club registered as a Community Interest Company on the 22nd May 2023.

Motto, "Nulli Secundus", is also the same motto as the Coldstream Guards.

== Bibliography ==
- Triumph: A Century of Passion and Power by Brooke, Lindsay
- Save the Triumph Bonneville: The Inside Story by Rosamond, John and Benn, Tony (2009)
- Bonneville Go or Bust: On the Roads Less Travelled, by Zoe Cano (2014)
- Triumph Around the World: by Robbie Marshall (2011)

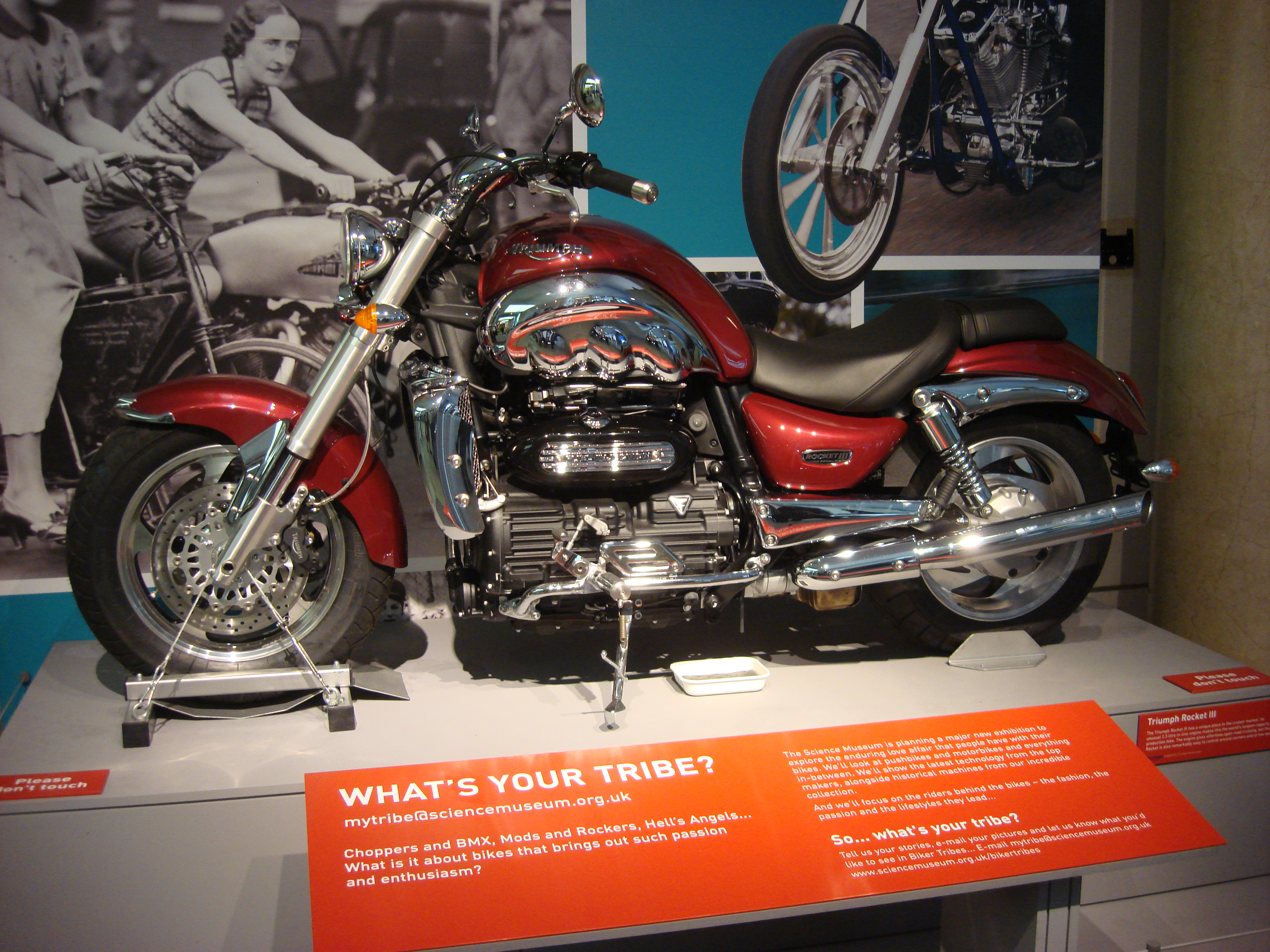
Triumph Rocket III

- Jupiter's Travels: by Ted Simon (1980)
- The Complete Book of Classic and Modern Triumph Motorcycles 1937- Today: by Ian Falloon (2015)

== See also ==
- List of motorcycle clubs
