= Leather & Lace Motorcycle Club =

Florida-based women's motorcycle club

Leather & Lace Motorcycle Club is an all-female motorcycle club that was formed in Florida in 1983. It is one of the first female motorcycle clubs with members throughout the United States, United Kingdom, and Canada. They bear "colors" of pink and black. The club’s insignia is two flesh-colored women angels with upswept brown and gold wings facing one another. A golden banner, with the 1983 conception date of the club, connects the two angels together in unity. The words, Leather & Lace, is located above the angels. The word, Sisterhood or Forever, is below the angels, with the letters M.C. written in pink and placed on a black background to the right of the banner.

Meaning of the insignia: The two flesh-colored angels stand for the women and their femininity. The angels facing each other stand for their camaraderie. The upswept wings stand for freedom. The opposite colors of brown and gold in the wings say they are the same, yet they are individuals. The golden banner brings the angels together and is their common bond of sharing the wind. "Leather" stands for the inner strength they possess as women and the physical strength they demonstrate in handling their motorcycles. "Lace" stands for their femininity, an important and intimate part of the Sisterhood.

The purpose of the club is to bring women together who have the common bond of riding. The goals of the club are to work together to better the future of all children, to promote the image of women motorcyclists through education and public enlightenment.

Leather & Lace MC began when a group of women riders wanted to help children. Initially, membership grew slowly due to the fact that in the early 1980s women riding motorcycles was not as acceptable as it is today.

Jennifer Chaffin, founder and President, started Leather & Lace MC in 1983. Chaffin’s goal was that an all-women motorcycle club will set a peaceful example for the warring men’s motorcycle (1%) clubs. Through charitable activities and involvement with their communities, Leather & Lace MC members insure the quality of life for all children, their communities in which they live and work, and, increase the public’s awareness concerning motorcycles and motorcyclists.
