= Peabody Heights Brewery =

Craft brewery in Baltimore, Maryland, US

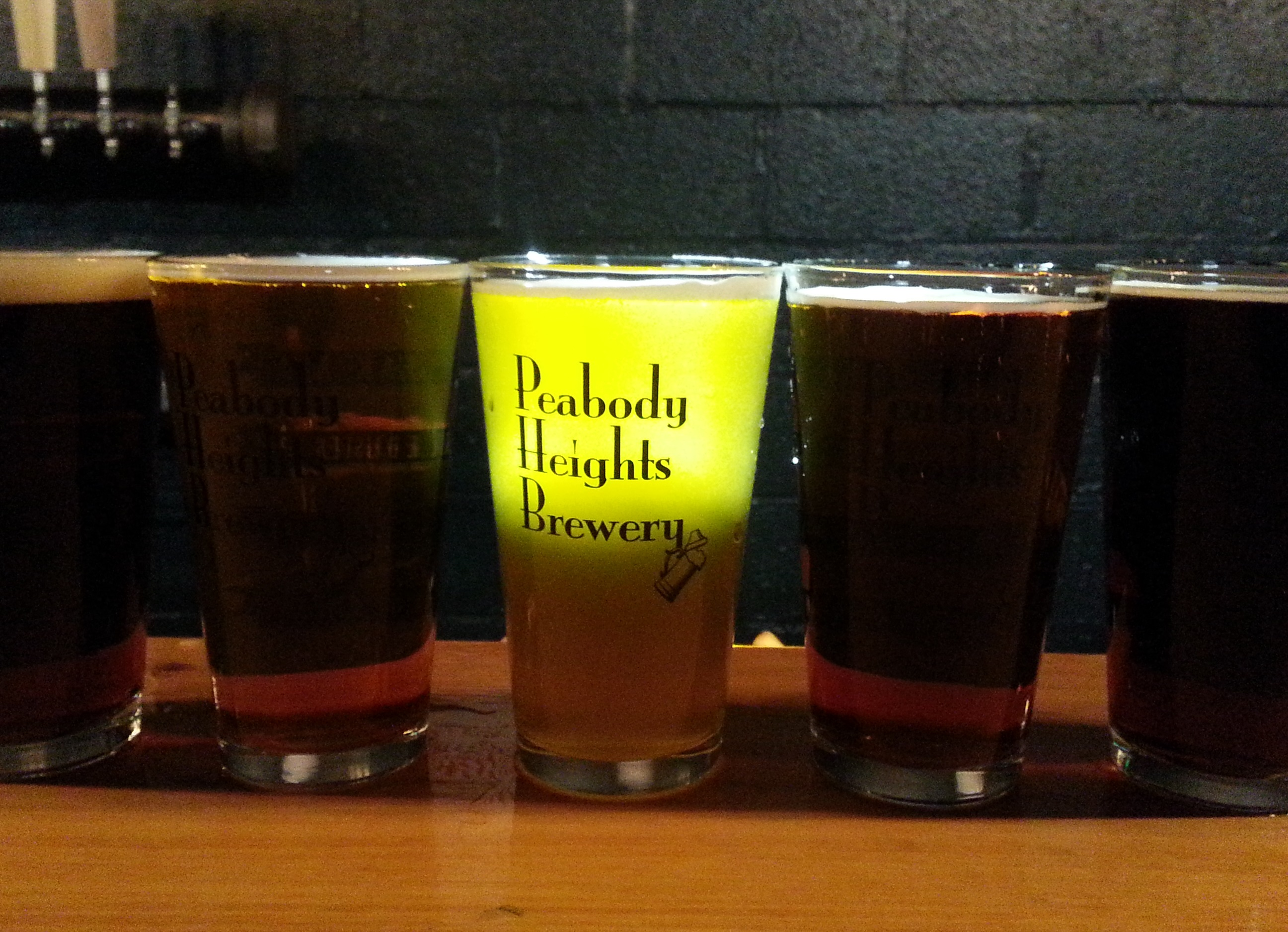
- Industry: Alcoholic beverage
- Founded: 2012
- Headquarters: Baltimore, Maryland, United States
- Products: Beer
- Owner: Richard O'keefe
- Website: www.peabodyheightsbrewery.com

Peabody Heights Brewery is a craft brewery located in the Abell neighborhood of Baltimore. It was founded in 2012 and is located on the site of Oriole Park V, also known as Terrapin Park. The 50,000 square feet (4,600 m^{2}) facility was previously used as the bottling plant of Capital Beverage until around 2010. Peabody Heights Brewery was the first large-scale brewery to open in Baltimore in 35 years. It operates as a co-op brewery, brewing and distributing beer for local craft breweries. In 2015, Old Oriole Park Bohemian won Best in Show in the Maryland Craft Beer Competition.

== History ==
Peabody Heights is located on the site of the Old Oriole Park V (1914-1944) and was the home of the Baltimore Orioles minor league team. A section of the original stadium still remains, though it was mostly destroyed by a fire in 1944. Old Oriole Park uses an image from the era which was the subject of a lawsuit. Prior to being a brewery the site was used as a bottling plant for Beverage Capital which produced Snapple.

Peabody Heights Brewery was founded by Stephen Demczuk and business partners in 2012. He sold his ownership to Richard O'Keefe in 2014 and in 2017 moved his brand, RavenBeer, to a larger bottling facility in Rosedale.

== Brands ==
Primary brands for Peabody Heights include Peabody Heights, as well as Public Works Ale, and Old Oriole Park. The beers are distributed in the Mid-Atlantic region. Emphasizing freshness and flavor, select beers are available as "First Day" beers. Old Oriole Park beers focus on drinkability and local ownership.

In 2017, Lost Python Ale was created in honor of Mr. Trash Wheel when a three-foot python was found in the trash collected in the Inner Harbor. Other beers brands are also brewed on site.

=== Beers ===
Peabody Heights

- Mr. Trash Wheel Lost Python Ale - Pilsner
- Togi - Amber Lager
- Mocha Obscuro - Imperial Stout
- Banana Cafe - Hefeweizen
- Cranberry Beret - Cranberry Hefeweizen

Old Oriole Park

- Bohemian - Light Lager
- Escape - Pineapple-Coconut Wheat
- Black & Tan - Bohemian & Stout
- Stout - Session Stout

Public Works

- Pineapple Fair Shake - Pineapple American Pale Ale
- Fair Shake - American Pale Ale
- Knuckle Buster - IPA
- Red Cent - Amber Ale
