= Blackout poetry =

Form of poetry

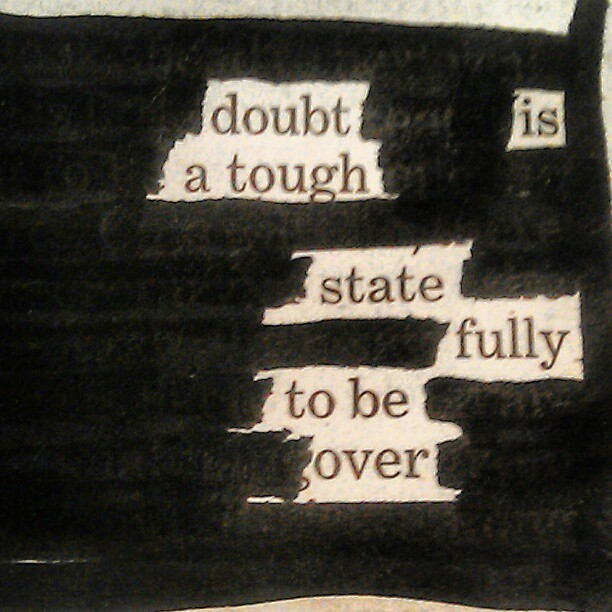
A piece of blackout poetry, created by blocking out words from a text

Blackout poetry, or erasure poetry, is a form of found poetry or found object art created by erasing words from an existing text in prose or verse and framing the result on the page as a poem. The results can be allowed to stand in situ or they can be arranged into lines or stanzas.

Writers and visual artists have used this form to achieve cognitive or symbolic effects and to focus on the social or political meanings of erasure. Blackout poetry is a way to give an existing piece of writing a new set of meanings, questions, or suggestions. It lessens the trace of authorship but also draws attention to the original text.

== History ==
Doris Cross appears to have been among the earliest to utilize this technique, beginning in 1965 with her "Dictionary Columns" book art. Other examples before 1980 include:

- A Humument, Tom Phillips' 1970 major work of book art and found poetry deconstructed from a Victorian novel.
- Radi Os, Ronald Johnson's, long 1977 poem deconstructed from the text of Milton's Paradise Lost.
- Mans Wows – Jesse Glass' Mans Wows (1981), is a series of poems and performance pieces mined from John George Hohman's book of charms and healings Pow Wows, or The Long Lost Friend.

Modern Poet Alicia Cook is known for redacting her own poetry to create new works. Since 2016, she has published three poetry collections, each featuring 92 original poems alongside their blackout poetry counterparts.

The poetic form gained new political purpose online in 2017 in response to the Trump administration.

The tradition of concrete poetry and the works of visual artists such as d.a. levy have some relationship to this artform.

== Use in representations of political or social themes ==
=== Government and military secrecy ===
Jenny Holzer's Redaction Paintings consists of enlarged silkscreen "paintings" of declassified and often heavily censored American military and intelligence documents released under the Freedom of Information Act. Documents address counter-terrorism, prisoner abuse, and the threat of Osama bin Laden. Some of the documents are completely blacked out, like Colin Powell's memo on Defense Intelligence Agency reorganization.

Anthropologist Michael Powell writes: "While the literal act of redaction attempts to extract information and eradicate meaning, the black marker actually transforms the way we read these documents, sparking curiosity and often stirring skeptical, critical, and even cynical readings. As redacted government documents make their way from government bureaus into the hands of citizens, a peculiar transformation seems to take place, one that seems to create a paranoia within reason."

Seven Testimonies (redacted) – Nick Flynn's "Seven Testimonies (redacted)" in The Captain Asks a Show of Hands, is an erasure of the testimonies from prisoners at Abu Ghraib.

=== Holocaust ===
Jonathan Safran Foer's 2010 Tree of Codes is a book-length erasure of The Street of Crocodiles by Bruno Schulz, a Polish Jewish writer killed by a Gestapo officer during the Nazi occupation of Drohobycz.

=== Freedom and Slavery ===
Poet Laureate Tracy K. Smith has written several erasure poems, including "Declaration" (drawn from the Declaration of Independence) and "The Greatest Personal Privation" (from letters about slaveholding).

Poet Nicole Sealey wrote The Ferguson Report: An Erasure, a book length erasure of the Ferguson Report which comments on the Killing of Michael Brown and the subsequent Ferguson unrest. Her poem "Pages 22–29, an excerpt from the book, won a Forward Prize for Poetry in October 2021.

=== Indigenous erasure poetry ===
Poets such as Jordan Abel and Billy-Ray Belcourt have engaged in erasure poetry to mirror the erasure of Indigenous peoples from history. Through working to erase existing texts such as Treaty 8 in "NDN Coping Mechanisms" by Billy-Ray Belcourt and "Totem Poles" by Canadian ethnographer Marius Barbeau in "The Place of Scraps" by Jordan Abel these two poets "make and unmake texts" the way Indigenous histories have been made and unmade by colonialist influences.

== See also ==
- Concrete poetry
- Frankenstein veto
