= Rainbow Motorcycle Club =

Gay men's motorcycle club in San Francisco

Rainbow Motorcycle Club patch, or "colors," as worn by members.

The Rainbow Motorcycle Club (sometimes abbreviated as the Rainbow MC or RMC) is a gay men's motorcycle club based in San Francisco, California. The club was founded in San Francisco in 1971 by Ron Johnson, Mario Pirami and Paul Denino. Some commentators have credited the RMC as being instrumental in the creation of the bear subculture among gay men during the 1980s and 1990s.

== Organization ==
The RMC has one credo: "No Rules, No Committees." It is unusual in the world of motorcycle clubs for having no charter or constitution, no officers and no membership dues.

== Membership ==
Initiated members of the club are sometimes referred to as "Rainbows," or (using a portmanteau of "Rainbow" and "brothers") as "Rainbros." Although the club is based in San Francisco, there are also members in Santa Cruz; Los Angeles and Palm Springs; Gulfport, Florida; and in Georgia. New members must only be recognized by existing members to join, and are not required to ride a motorcycle.

Unlike many motorcycle clubs where someone who aspires to membership must first serve a term as a "prospect" or "probate" before being granted full membership, the RMC uses the "hangaround" period to determine suitability. Once patched in, the new member serves an indefinite period (generally until the next new member is inducted) as the club "Baby," a status not unlike that of a prospect in other clubs.

== Activities ==
RMC members have engaged in a number of activities, including:

- participation in the annual Badger Flat motorcycle run, organized by the Satyrs Motorcycle Club of Los Angeles.
- participation in the annual French Meadows motorcycle run, organized by the Valley Knights Motorcycle Club based in Sacramento, California.
- informal motorcycle runs in Northern California.
- parties, performances and fund-raising beer busts at venues such as 544 Natoma and the Hole in the Wall Saloon in San Francisco.

== In popular culture ==
- In Urban Aboriginals (ISBN 0917342380), Geoff Mains' 1984 study of leathermen, the chapter entitled "Celebration of the Hidden Animal" opens with a photograph featuring an RMC patch lying over the drain in a barroom floor
