= Madras Bulls =

Motorcycle club in Chennai, India

Madras Bulls (Madbulls)
- Abbreviation: Madras Bulls Motorcycling Club
- Founded: 2002
- Founded at: Chennai, India
- Type: Informal, independent
- Region served: India
- Website: www.madrasbulls.in

The Madras Bulls Motorcycling Club or Madbulls is an informal motorcycling club based in Chennai, Tamil Nadu, India. The club was founded in April 2002, with the focus on the Royal Enfield Bullet series of motorcycles. The club came to being in April, 2002, with a passion towards the Royal Enfield Bullet with the tag line "To Hell with you, To Heaven with Us"
