= Motorcycle Riders Association of Australia =

Australian non-profit organization

The Motorcycle Riders Association of Australia, also known as MRAA and since 2008 as MRA (Vic), was founded in Melbourne on May 16, 1978, at the St Kilda Inn by Chris Stalwell, Mark Conner and Damien Codognotto at the suggestion of the Hell's Angels then secretary "Ball Bearing". It was founded as a non-profit organisation representing the interests of motorcyclists in Victoria, Australia. The aims of the MRA (Vic) were the promotion of road safety, fair and sensible laws, and a better image for motorcyclists. MRAA membership soon surpassed an existing association called the Federation of Australian Motorcyclists. The slogan of the US ABATE group "let those that ride decide" was adopted by the MRAA.

It had some successes, including challenging the 80 km/h restriction for riders with pillion passengers and continuing a workable policy for parking motorcycles on the footpath began by the FAM with City of Melbourne Council, in a manner that does not cause obstruction. While this is tolerated in many jurisdictions due to its practical value, this has long been developed into a formal and sound published policy in Victoria, and is backed by an active and successful working committee operated by Melbourne City Council (the Motorcycles in Melbourne Committee) which has been able to resolve issues raised in a creative and cooperative manner, and progressively expand motorcycle parking provisions of all kinds as the demand and volumes of motorcycles have risen. The MRAA began a Blood Challenge to Victoria Police in 1978 kicking off fund raising efforts. After reading about the publicity success of the Hell's Angels run "Toyruns" in America, the MRAA also began running Toyruns each year, donating gifts, money and food to the Salvation Army Christmas appeal. A "4Bs" (Bent, Buckled Bikies Bureau) was also formed to provide care and advice to injured riders.

MRA (Vic) representatives participated on various State and Federal committees including the following:

- VicRoads Road Safety Reference Group,
- Victorian Motorcycle Advisory Council (VMAC)
- Australian Motorcycle Council (AMC)
- Standards Australia (Helmet Standards)
- Australian Transport Safety Bureau (ATSB)

One of the successes in long-term negotiation through and participation on several of these committees has been the creation of the first State Transport and Safety Strategy for motorcycles, issued by the Victorian Minister of Transport's Motorcycle Advisory Group (MAG).

The growth in motorcycles and other powered two-wheelers in Victoria has increased the importance of including transport aspects in motorcycle strategies.

In 1979 a National MRA was formulated but continued infighting with the Victorian branch meant by the mid-1980s the National MRA had split into various state organisations with the Victorian organisation then registering the MRA Australia title. After a failed court challenge to the RTA in the mid-1980s over tramway "yellow bricks" the association was left by its founding president with a $20,000 legal debt which the MRA's solicitor Jim Gurry always stated would not be called in but the debt was paid off in full by the association. The founding president quit and membership declined. The association continued on for a few years but in 1993 the founding president retook control of the association in a hotly debated SGM. By 1998 after firing the association accountant he left the association again with a $16500 debt to the founding president's private company. There was no threat of insolvency because the founding President always insisted he would never call it in. Membership continued to decline. By 2002 the association was back in the black and repayments on the loan had begun as reported in the Association's Financial records. After a heated meeting the then President Alex Money was granted an AVO against the founding president for threats and harassment. Alex Money and the Association board then disagreed over court costs and Alex resigned. After several changes of elected boards and continued disputes with the founding president and his supporters, the founding president was expelled in 2005 for bringing the association into disrepute. A later SGM in 2006 culminated in fisticuffs. Membership continued to decline. In 2008 the organisation adopted the trading name of MRA (Vic), as it worked on consolidating activities and focus on the state of Victoria, consistent with the organisations in other states, combined under the Australian national organisation, the Australian Motorcycle Council (AMC), of which they are all members.

The MRA organisations in other Australian states are also members of the AMC and accessible under the portal website.

By 2011, factional infighting between supporters of the founding president and other groups saw the association hand over advocacy to the Victorian Motorcycle Council at the AGM. By 2013, interest in the MRA (vic) had waned to the point that no board was elected and the association was wound up and all intellectual and physical assets were passed to the VMC as per the motion voted on by members in 2013. Two $2000 donations were made to the Alfred Foundation for the Alfred Hospital Trauma centre from the MRA (Vic) funds. The MRA(Vic) (ne Australia) incorporation was cancelled in 2014. Advocacy for Victorian Motorcyclists is now represented by the Victorian Motorcycle Council, founded in 1996 and reinvigorated in 2011. The traditional Melbourne Toyrun continues to run each year, organised by the VMC.
