= Dictionary Stories =

First book edition

Dictionary Stories, by Jez Burrows, is a collection of stories built using sample sentences for words from the New Oxford American Dictionary. Originally shared on Tumblr, Dictionary Stories was released as a book by Harper Perennial in 2018.
