= Donegal X-Press =

US musical group

The Donegal X-Press is a Celtic rock band formed in Baltimore, Maryland, in 1997. In recent years, the band has incorporated a distinct country/roots rock sound into their brand of Irish music, although they have always been known for their eclectic mix of musical styles.

== Band history ==
The Donegal X-Press was formed in early 1997 by Brad Dunnells (guitar, vocals) and Jason Tinney (harmonica, vocals), two Towson University theater students. After drafting their friends Lyle Hein (bass, vocals) and Morgan Stanton (percussion, vocals), the group set out to play a one-off gig for a friend's St. Patrick's Day party. They took their name from "Donegal Express," a song by Shane MacGowan and The Popes. They received such an enthusiastic response at their first show that they decided to take their act to some local pubs, most notably Mick O'Shea's in downtown Baltimore.

After adding Skye Sadowski (fiddle) and Laura Hein (keyboards), the group released their first album, Whiskey Bars A-Go-Go, in 1999.

In 2000, they released their second album, Quinn's Diaries. The album went on to receive numerous positive reviews, and was named Album of the Year by the Irish Voice, beating out the likes of Sinéad O'Connor and U2. Additionally, the song "Omagh," which appeared on Quinn's Diaries, won First Prize at the Songs for Peace Concert in Cork, in March 2001. Singer Brad Dunnells, who wrote the song, is the only American to ever win the award. Also in 2000, Jeff Malcom (bass, drums) joined the band. Jeff and Skye are married and have three children.

The band has continued to tour and release albums, the latest being Father O'Leary Memorial Boys Club in 2005.

== Discography ==
- Whiskey Bars A-Go-Go (1999)
- Quinn's Diaries (2000)
- Translations (2001)
- Stand Alone (2003)
- Father O'Leary Memorial Boys Club (2005)
- Paid Off The Boom (2012)
