= Fairie Festival =

Music and arts festival

The Fairie Festival
- Status: Active
- Genre: Arts and music festival, folklore, fantasy
- Frequency: Annually
- Venue: Rocky Point Park and Beach (2022–present)
- Locations: Baltimore, Maryland
- Country: United States
- Years active: 1991–present (excluding 2020–2021)
- Inaugurated: 1991
- Founder: Rob and Lucy Wood (owners of Spoutwood Farm)
- Participants: Artists, authors, musicians, dancers, crafters
- Attendance: Over 16,000 annually (as of 2010)
- Major events: Maypole dancing, Fairie tea parties, Costume contests, Workshops, Juried arts and crafts vending
- Organiser: Spoutwood Farm Center; Marshy Point Nature Center; Baltimore County Park System

The Fairie Festival (also known as the May Day Fairie Festival, or Pennsylvania Fairie Festival) is a music and arts festival currently held annually in Glen Rock, Pennsylvania, that began in 1991. The festival's primary theme is to "celebrate the beginning of spring and all of the faerie and nature spirits' return to the warm world".

== History ==
The May Day Fairie Festival is the brainchild of Rob and Lucy Wood, owners of Spoutwood Farm, an organic farm in the Community Supported Agriculture movement. It began as a tea party for about 100 friends and their children, and attendance has grown to over 16,000 “friends” annually. Previously a one-day festival, a second day was added in 2001; a third, in 2006. The festival features artists and authors from around the world, local and international musicians and crafters whose work is connected to or inspired by folklore, specifically faerie lore. On 1/10/ 2018 Rob and Lucy Wood announced that May 2018 will be the last Fairie Festival to be held at Spoutwood Farm due to the stress it puts on the farm. In short the festival has grown too big for the farm. A new location was sought out for the future which was announced and held at Marshy Point Nature Center, located at 7130 Marshy Point Rd, Baltimore, MD 21220. The May Day Fairie Festival is now known as the Summer Solstice Faerie Festival presented in partnership by Spoutwood Farm Center, Marshy Point Nature Center and the Baltimore County Park System. With the close of the May Day Fairie Festival, there has been an insurgence of new Faerie Festivals in the local area. These festivals are a welcome addition to the FAEMILY, however they should not be confused with the May Day Fairie Festival and are in no way affiliated with Spoutwood Farm Center. These festivals are being held in New Freedom, Sunbury and York Pennsylvania.

There were no festivals in 2020-21.

== Events ==
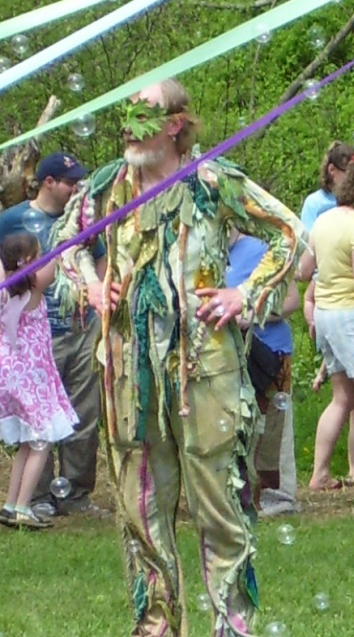
Rob Wood as the Greenman,

The May Day Fairie Festival was the first festival in the United States devoted solely to faerie and nature spirits. It has been held on the grounds of Spoutwood Farm Center since 1991.

The festival expects, each year, performances by musicians and dancers, storytellers, participatory maypole dancing, fairie craft activities such as wand and garland making. It provides 70 juried arts and crafts vendors (featuring handmade art inspired by the faerie), and food vendors. The Nature Place offers a place for environmental, health, animal interest and other groups to share their vision; fairie and gnome habitat tours are to be expected, along with fairie tea parties, and guest appearances by Sweet Pea, the Mossmen, and the Green Man. Alongside the traditional May Day crowning of the May Queen may be seen the crowning of the May King, Prince, and Princess. The Fairie Chautauqua offers the opportunity for attendees to delve more deeply into the lore and arts of Fairie, in workshops led by scholars, artists, musicians, and crafters.

== Impact ==
Each year, the Fairie Festival benefits the Spoutwood Farm Center CSA, which in turn provides organically produced food to over 150 families in the community. The Fairie Festival maintains an example of ecologically sound entertainment in the fantasy genre; it utilizes recycled printed materials, compostable foodware, and features a food court of diverse food vendors, including organic and vegetarian food vendors. In 2000, the Fairie Festival instituted a "Zero Waste" policy, requiring all vendors to haul out their own trash, and all food vendors to provide compostable materials to their customers. The compostable materials are added to a special compost pile located at the entrance to the CSA, and is part of the educational programs offered to attendees. In 2010, after a three-day event attended by over 17,000 people, a total of 23 plastic bags worth of non-recyclables and non-compostables were collected and disposed of by Waste Management of York County.

Attendance is international, with vendors and attendees coming from England, Australia and Japan.

The Fairie Festival was the subject of a 2010 documentary entitled "Glen Rock Fae: The Spoutwood Fairie Festival" on the Internet Movie Database.

== See also ==
- Fairy Investigation Society
- Glen Rock Carolers
- List of fairy and sprite characters
- May Day
