= Fertile Ground =

American soul jazz band

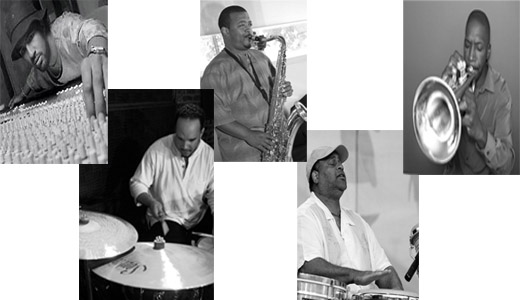

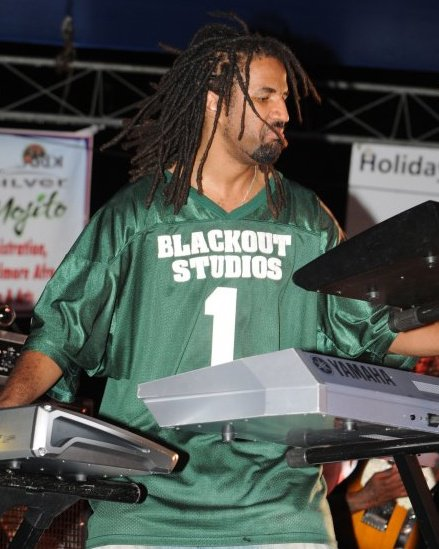
James H. Collins Jr.

Fertile Ground is an American soul jazz band led by James H. Collins Jr. The group was founded in Baltimore.

== History ==
James Collins founded Fertile Ground in 1998 as a three-piece band with vocalist Navasha Daya and drummer Marcus Asante. The band represented soulful songwriting over world rhythms.

Collins created the record label Blackout Studios, and the band self-released Field Songs (1998) and Spiritual War (1999). In 2000, label owner Jake Behnan of Counterpoint Records became enthused about the band and licensed the band's first two albums for a compilation entitled Perception. The Japanese label P-Vine Records agreed to release the band's music throughout Asia. By 2002, the band had sold 85,000 copies of their first two albums.

In 2012, Daya released a solo album, Rebirthed Above Ground.

Percussionist Ekendra Das now lives in Florida, and released his own project entitled Ethnomusicology, as well as an instructional DVD on percussion. He still performs and records with various artists, and teaches as well.
