= Blessing of the Bikes =

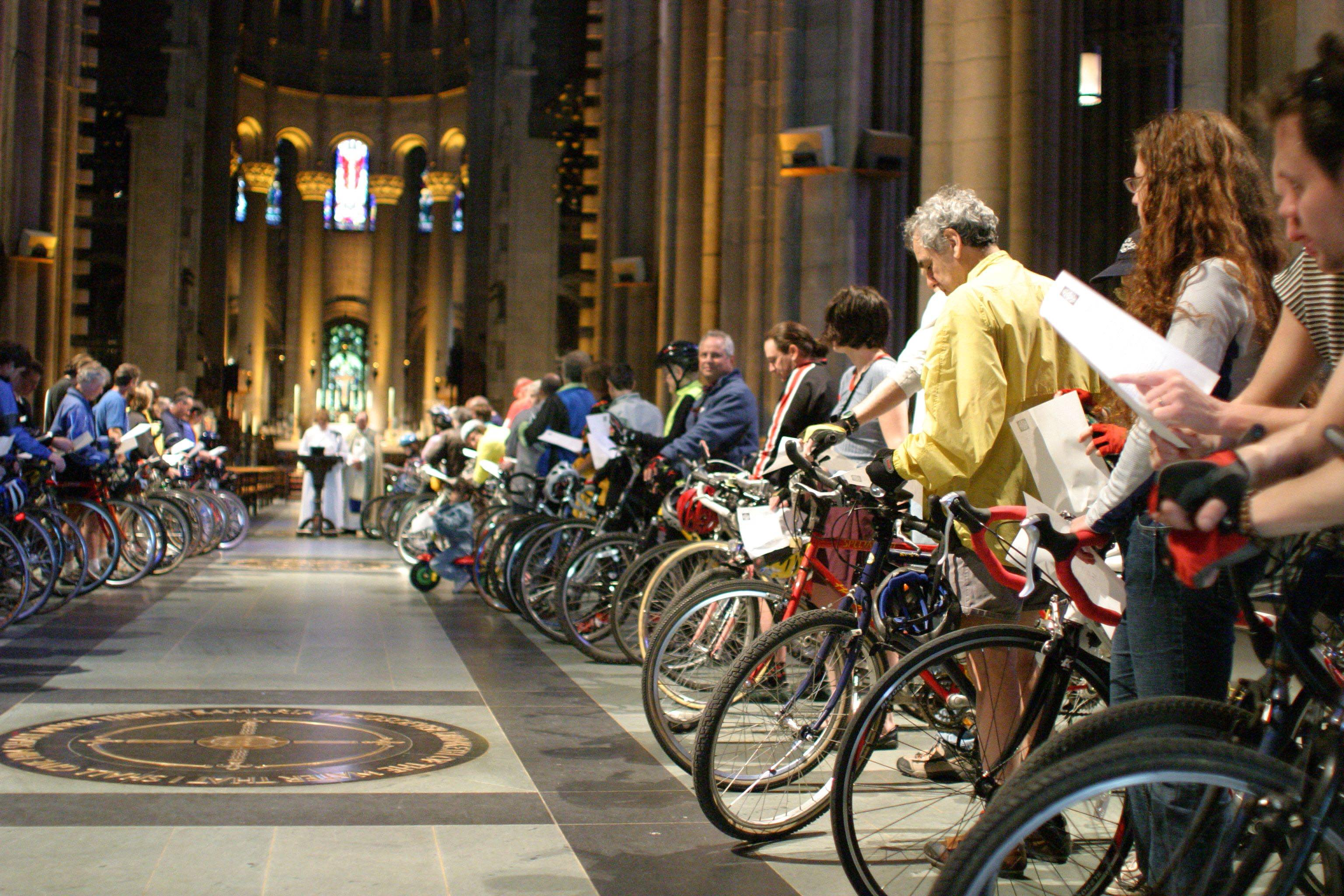
The Blessing of the Bicycles in the Cathedral Church of St. John the Divine, New York City (probably 2003).

The Blessing of the Bikes, also The Blessing of the Bicycles, is an annual tradition in which riders of motorcycles or bicycles are blessed by a priest in the hope that it will bring safety for the coming season. Many towns hold annual ceremonies to bless motorcycles at the start of the summer.

The first blessing of the bikes occurred in the early 1800s at Old St Patrick in downtown Manhattan. Other mass blessings of bicycles have been held in 1999 at the Cathedral of St. John the Divine in New York City. Since its beginning the ceremony has been ostensibly non-denominational, focusing more on rider safety than religion. However, the service does include prayers and reading of biblical passages, and bicycles are sprinkled with holy water. A brief memorial service is held to acknowledge riders who have died in the previous year.

The popularity of the service has encouraged other localities to follow suit. Annual blessings are held from Burlington, Massachusetts to Los Angeles to Melbourne and incorporate varying degrees of emphasis on religion, environmentalism, fitness, cyclists' rights, and safety.

In 2013, Good Samaritan Hospital celebrated its 10th Annual Blessing of the Bikes in Los Angeles

In 2018, in Rennes (France), a blessing of cyclists, bicycles and scooters took place in the presence of 600 participants.

In 2023 in Nancy cathedral (France), the bishop blessed the bikes and scooters.

== See also ==
- Blessing of the Fleet
