= Combat Veterans Motorcycle Association =

American organization

Combat Veterans Motorcycle Association (R)
- Full member patch of the CVMA
- Formation: 2001
- Region served: US
- President: Kevin “Boomer” Nies
- Vice-President: Christopher “Lunchbox” Aker
- Treasurer: David “Reeper” Worley
- Website: combatvet.us

The Combat Veterans Motorcycle Association (R) (CVMA) is an association of veterans from all branches of the United States Armed Forces who ride motorcycles. The CVMA mission is to support and defend those who have defended their country and their freedoms. The focus of the CVMA is to help Veteran care facilities provide a warm meal, clothing, shelter, and guidance, or simply to say "thank you" and "welcome home."

The association has 3 membership classifications: Full Members (those with verified combat service), Support Members (non-combat military service), and Auxiliary members (spouse, widow or widower of a good standing CVMA member)(see bylaws). The CVMA(R) has members from all 50 states and living abroad. Many members continue to serve in the Armed Forces of the United States.

The CVMA sponsors and participates in many motorcycle-related charity events each year, and as a non-profit organization, donate to various Veteran care facilities and Veteran charities.

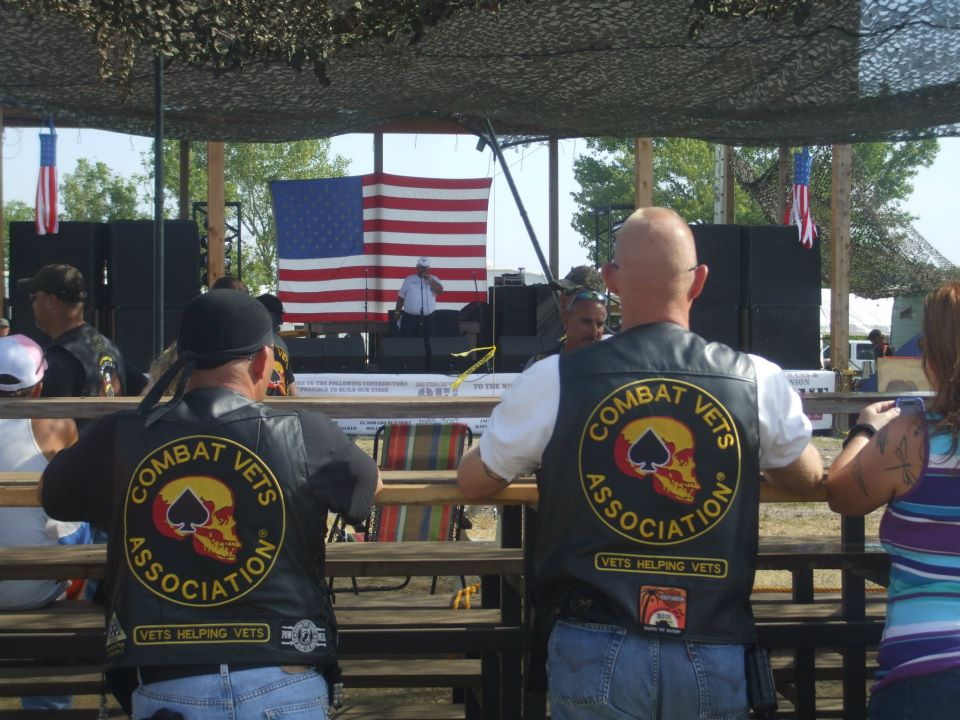
Full Members Patch

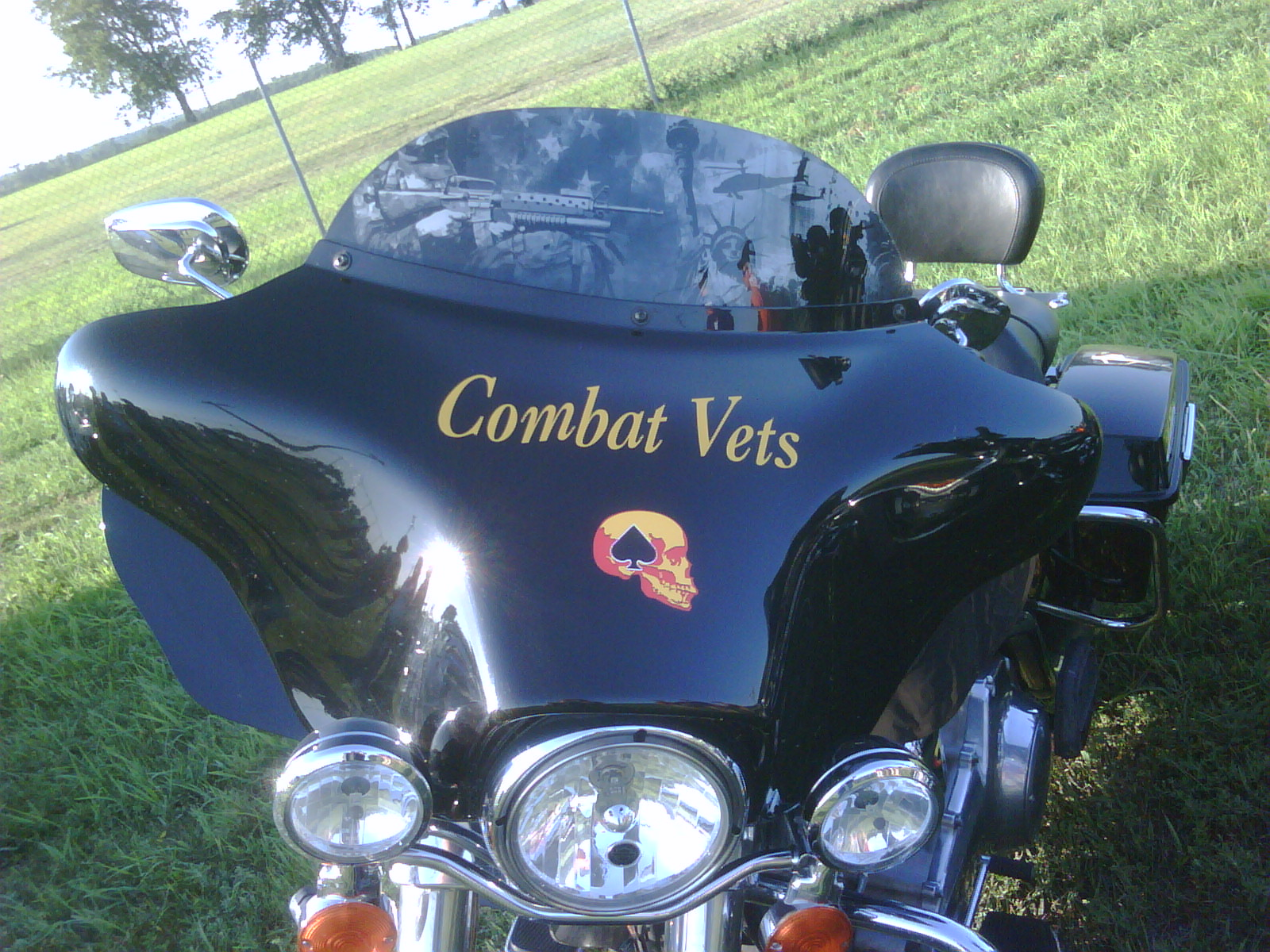
Full Members Bike
