= What Weekly =

Online magazine

- Editors-in-chief: Brooke Hall, Justin Allen
- Categories: Alternative, Cultural magazine
- Frequency: Weekly
- Publisher: What Works Studio
- Founded: 2009
- Country: USA
- Based in: Baltimore, Maryland
- Website: whatweekly.com

What Weekly is an online magazine published in Baltimore, Maryland, USA, focusing on the visual arts, popular culture, humor and writing. According to its tagline, What Weekly focuses on the beautiful in creative culture and beyond. It is produced by the creative agency What Works Studio.

== History ==
The magazine was established in 2009 by Brooke Hall and Justin Allen with the tagline "Documenting the Baltimore Renaissance". Allen said in an interview with Baltimore's City Paper, "There didn't seem to be any good news about what was happening in Baltimore, people seem to have this perception that it’s a very negative place, but it’s really coming up. We’re hitting the brink of a really happening time in Baltimore."

== Awards ==
What Weekly was named "Best New Magazine" in 2011 and "Best Zine" for 2013 by Baltimore magazine.
