= Justin Allen =

- Born: Houston, Texas, U.S.
- Occupation: Athletic personal trainer
- Organization: ALL-EN SPORTS PERFORMANCE
- Known for: Training elite athletes in the NFL and NBA

Justin Allen is an American athletic trainer and the founder of ALL-EN SPORTS PERFORMANCE, based in Houston, Texas. He is known for training elite athletes across professional sports, including the NFL and NBA.

== Early life and education ==
Allen grew up in Texas and is the younger brother of Dwayne Allen, a former NFL tight end and Super Bowl LIII champion. His early life was marked by challenges, including periods of homelessness. He attended college and played football until injuries forced his retirement in 2018.

== Career ==
Following his transition away from competitive sports, Allen began training young athletes in local parks, initially offering free coaching sessions. His first notable client was CeeDee Lamb, now a wide receiver for the Dallas Cowboys. This marked the beginning of his professional training career.

Allen has since worked with numerous high-profile athletes, including James Harden, Jarred Vanderbilt, Tank Dell, C. J. Stroud, Tyreek Hill, Dalvin Cook, Keon Coleman, DeAndre Hopkins, Jaylen Waddle, and Xavien Howard. His training methodologies focus on performance optimization and injury prevention.

In addition to working with professional athletes, Allen trains top college and high school athletes across the United States.

== Recognition ==
Allen's contributions to sports training have been acknowledged by the City of Houston, which declared an official Justin Allen Day in December 2023.
