= Motor Maids =

North American women's motorcycle club

Motor Maids, Inc
- Founded: 1940
- Type: AMA chartered corporation
- Purpose: Women's Motorcycle Club
- Region served: USA and Canada
- Members: 1,300
- Website: www.motormaidsinc.org

Motor Maids is a women's motorcycle club in North America with over 1,300 members from the United States and Canada. Established in 1940, Motor Maids was one of the first women's motorcycle groups and has been called the oldest existing women's club in the United States. The first president of Motor Maids was Dot Robinson, who held the position for 25 years.

== Purpose and activities ==
The mission statement of this group is to ride together as a group and club, to have fun as a group, respect history and believe in the traditions. Arthur Davidson, one of the founders of Harley-Davidson Motor Company, supported the Motor Maids which benefited the group.

== History ==
Motor Maids founder Dot Goulding was born April 22, 1912, in Australia. Her father, James Goulding, was a motorcyclist who worked as a sidecar designer and an amateur racer. In 1918, when Dot was about six years old, her father moved the family to the United States in the hope of expanding his sidecar designing business. He ran a motorcycle dealership, so at a young age Dot became well acquainted with operating a bike. In high school she met her future husband Earl Robinson, who she would eventually marry in 1931. Together they took part in multiple races. Dot entered herself in a Jack Pine National Endurance Championship in 1934. By 1940 she had won Jack Pine and became known as the first woman to win an AMA national competition.

In 1935 Harley-Davidson asked Dot and Earl, to run a dealership. The Robinsons moved to Detroit where they operated a successful Harley-Davidson dealership until 1971. Motor Maids co-founder Linda Dugeau and Dot Robinson met in 1940 at the Laconia national and within months the Motor Maids organization was in full motion. When the Robinsons retired from the dealership in 1971, they begin to travel together by motorcycle until Earl died in 1996. Dot continued to ride and explore until 1998 when a knee replacement slowed her down. Robinson died on October 8, 1999, age 87.

== Motor Maids organizations and charities ==
Motor Maids help charities and other groups such as breast cancer awareness. They use dinners, showings and conventions to promote their group and help others. The group participated in the Six-County Firemen Association's Convention-Mount Carmel, PA in 2010. Motor Maids paraded in the Charity Newsies event every year up until 1979 and in 2012 were asked once again to ride in the 150th anniversary of this parade. They were asked by many other organizations to participate in races and parades around the country and Canada.

== Logo, color, and uniform ==
In the 1940s, many members were in the military. During that time period it was not easy for all of the members to get together for meetings because of gas rationing. On May 27 and 28, 1944 the first formal convention was held. This meeting was led by Jane Farrow and Jo Folden in Columbus, Ohio. The first Regional Meeting was held later that year in Plainfield, New Jersey. From this came the decision on the colors and the logo for Motor Maids. It was decided that royal blue and silver gray would make up the colors and a shield would represent the logo. Another thing that came from this meeting was the uniform for the group. At the start the uniforms were tailor-made of silver-gray gabardine with royal blue piping. This soon changed and the uniform became gray slacks, royal blue over-blouse with white boots, and a tie. Down the road in 2006, the group voted to change the uniform again. It was then changed to what it is in present day. It consists of black pants and boots, royal blue mock neck long sleeved shirt with a white cotton vest, and white gloves. White gloves were added in 1941 when Howard Foley went to the Motor Maids with the idea of parading at the Charity Newsies Race. During this parade, the Motor Maids wore white gloves making them known as the "Ladies of the White Gloves". They continued to parade for this event each year up until 1979. The Motor Maids are required to wear royal blue mock turtleneck and white cotton vest, jet-black slacks, and clean black footwear. For parades white gloves are added. The rest are required at a convention for the parade, formal group picture, and banquet.
