= List of veterans' organizations =

This is a list of veterans' organizations by country.

== List of veterans' organizations ==
=== International veterans' organizations ===
- Royal Commonwealth Ex-Services League
- War Veterans Committee
- The Greatest Generations Federation
- World Association of Home Army Soldiers
- World Veterans Federation

=== National veterans' organizations ===
==== Australia ====
- Returned and Services League

==== Canada ====
- Army, Navy and Air Force Veterans in Canada
- Canadian Airborne Forces Association
- Canadian Military Intelligence Association
- The Royal Canadian Legion

==== France ====
- French Foreign Legion Veteran Societies Federation

==== Germany ====
- de:Bund Deutscher EinsatzVeteranen (current)
- Der Stahlhelm, Bund der Frontsoldaten (historical, WW1)
- Reichsbund jüdischer Frontsoldaten (historical, WW1) (re-founded in 2006 as Bund Jüdischer Soldaten)
- Kyffhäuserbund (founded 1900, dissolved 1943, re-founded 1952)

==== Hungary ====
- Hungarian Royal Gendarme Veterans' Association

==== Indonesia ====
- Veterans' Legion

==== Japan ====
- Kaikosha

==== Myanmar (Burma) ====
- Myanmar War Veterans Organization (MWVO)

==== New Zealand ====
- Returned and Services Association

==== Philippines ====
- Association of Veterans of the Revolution
- Veterans Federation of the Philippines

==== South Africa ====
- Memorable Order of Tin Hats
- The South African Legion
- South African Defence Force Association (SADFA)
- Council for Military Veteran Organisations (CMVO)
- South African National Military Veterans Association (SANMVA)

==== United Kingdom ====
- The Royal British Legion
- SSAFA, the Armed Forces charity
- Victory Services Club

==== United States ====
- Academy of United States Veterans
- Air Force Association
- Air Force Sergeants Association
- American Ex-Prisoners of War
- American G.I. Forum
- American Legion
- AMVETS
- American Veterans Committee (dissolved 2008)
- American Veterans Committee (2013–present day)
- American Veterans for Equal Rights
- Army and Navy Union
- Association of Military Surgeons of the United States
- Association of the United States Army
- Aztec Club (organized by officers of the Mexican War)
- Blinded Veterans Association
- Blue Star Families
- Catholic War Veterans
- Combat Veterans Motorcycle Association
- DAV
- Distinguished Flying Cross Society
- Fleet Reserve Association
- Forty and Eight
- Gary Sinise Foundation
- Grand Army of the Republic (dissolved 1956)
- Iraq and Afghanistan Veterans of America
- Iraq War Veterans Organization
- Jewish War Veterans
- Marine Corps League
- Military Officers Association of America
- Military Order of the Carabao (organized by officers of the Philippine Insurrection)
- Military Order of the Cootie
- Military Order of the Dragon (organized by officers of the China Relief Expedition)
- Military Order of Foreign Wars (organized by veterans of the Mexican War)
- Military Order of the Loyal Legion (organized by Union army officers)
- Military Order of the Purple Heart
- Military Order of the Stars and Bars (organized by Confederate army officers)
- Military Order of the World Wars (organized by officers of World War I)
- Montford Point Marines
- Navy League of the United States
- National Association for Black Veterans
- National Guard Association of the United States
- Navy Musicians Association
- Navy Mutual Aid Association
- Paralyzed Veterans of America
- Pearl Harbor Survivors Association (dissolved 2011)
- Polish Legion of American Veterans
- Society of American Military Engineers
- Society of the Cincinnati (organized by American Continental Army officers)
- SoldierStrong
- State Guard Association of the United States
- Student Veterans of America
- Supportive Services for Veteran Families (SSVF)
- Team Red, White & Blue
- Ukrainian American Veterans
- United Confederate Veterans (dissolved 1951)
- United Spanish War Veterans (dissolved 1992)
- United States Submarine Veterans
- United States Submarine Veterans of World War II (dissolved 2012)
- Veterans' Alliance for Security and Democracy
- Veterans for Common Sense
- Veterans for Peace
- Veterans of Foreign Wars
- Vietnamese American Armed Forces Association
- Vietnam Veterans of America
- Veterans Inc.
- Common Defense

==== Zimbabwe ====
- Zimbabwe National Liberation War Veterans Association
