= Kyffhäuserbund =

Veteran's organization in Germany

- Kyffhäuserbund banner until around 1934
- Named after: Kyffhäuser Monument
- Formation: 1900; 1952; 74 years ago
- Dissolved: 1943; 83 years ago
- Website: Official website

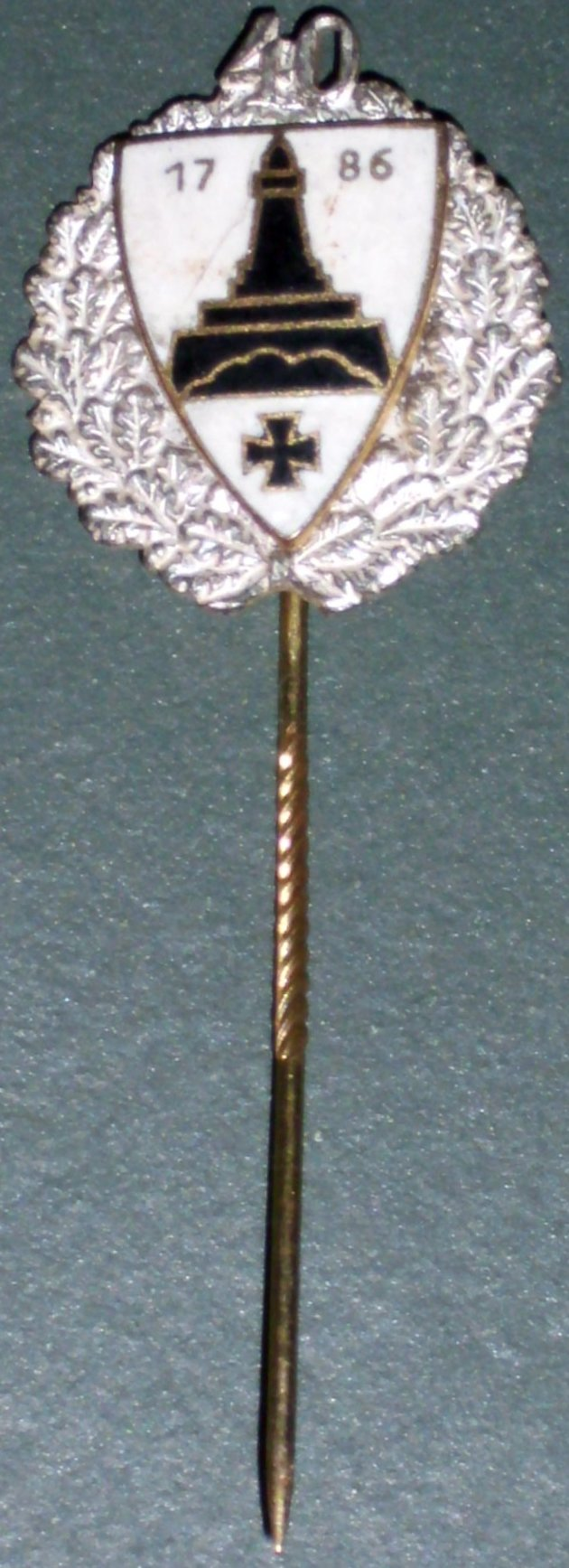
Post 1945 Kyffhäuserbund loyalty pin for forty years of membership

The Kyffhäuserbund (English: Kyffhäuser League) was an umbrella organization for war veterans' and reservists' associations in Germany based in Rüdesheim am Rhein. It owes its name to the Kyffhäuser Monument (German: Kyffhäuserdenkmal), a memorial built on the summit of the 473 m high Kyffhäuser mountain near Bad Frankenhausen in the state of Thuringia in central Germany.

== History ==
The Kyffhäuserbund's origins lie in a section of the Deutscher Kriegerbund (English: German Warrior League) that established a league in 1900 that would unite the formerly scattered German war veterans' associations. Some of these organizations had already been administering the maintenance of the memorial together. The league was initially named Kyffhäuser League of the German Countries' Warriors Associations (German: Kyffhäuserbund der deutschen Landeskriegerverbände), a name that became later abbreviated to Kyffhäuserbund. By 1913, this umbrella organization had already 2.8 million war veterans as its members and it had become one of the largest societies in Germany. During the time of the German Empire, the Kyffhäuserbund was instrumentalized against the growing social democratic movement in Germany.

The difficult circumstances of World War I's postwar years led to a significant shrinking of the veterans' associations and their role. During the Weimar Republic in 1921, this organization shed its federal structure and centralized itself under a common leadership. Following this step, it changed its name to German Warriors Association Kyffhäuser (German: Deutscher Reichskriegerbund Kyffhäuser e.V.). In the name of Gleichschaltung, the Kyffhäuserbund was Nazified after the Nazi takeover of power in 1933. Five years later, its name was altered to Nationalsocialist Reich Warriors Association Kyffhäuser (German: NS-Reichskriegerbund Kyffhäuser e.V.), becoming the sole and exclusive organization representing the veterans' interests in the Third Reich. It was headed by Wilhelm Reinhard from 1934 to its dissolution in 1943.

The Kyffhäuserbund was swiftly and unceremoniously disbanded during World War II in March 1943 by Adolf Hitler himself. Apparently, the reason was the German defeat in the Battle of Stalingrad. Its assets in the whole Reich were transferred to the Nazi Party. All its surviving local associations, which in the last phase of the war effort became the breeding ground for Volkssturm units, were also placed under the direct orders of the Nazi Party. After Nazi Germany's defeat in World War II, the Allied military governments issued a special law, Kontrollratsgesetz Nr. 2, for the disbandment and liquidation of the Nazi organizations (Auflösung und Liquidierung der Naziorganisationen) on 10 October 1945. This denazification decree outlawed the Nazi Party and all of its branches, effectively disbanding the Kyffhäuserbund's avatar that had been established during the Third Reich.

The disbandment of the Kyffhäuserbund meant that it had to be established anew during the postwar reconstruction of both West and East Germany.

The reestablishment of the Kyffhäuser organization with federal state branches began in September 1952 in West Germany, and it was again headed by Reinhard until his death in January 1955. The present-day Kyffhäuserbund emphasizes its role as a shooting sports association.

== Uniforms and insignia ==
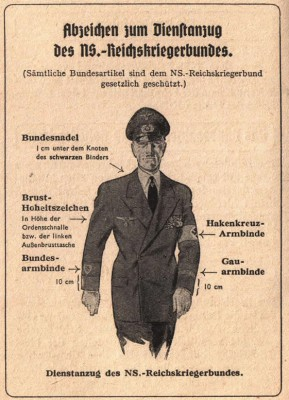
Uniform of the Kyffhäuserbund

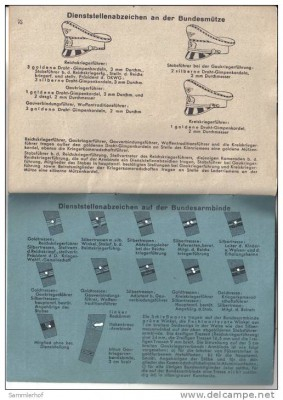
Ranks and peaked caps of the Kyffhäuserbund

Like many other Nazi paramilitary organizations, they also had ranks and uniforms.

Insignia	Rank	Translation
	Reichskriegerführer
	Stellvertreter der Reichskriegerführers
	Stabführer
	Abteilungsleiter
	Referenten
	Gaukriegerführer
	Führerstab
	Adjudant
	Gauverbindungsführer; Waffentraditionsführer
	Kreiskriegerführer; Traditionsverbandsführer
	Führerstab
	Kriegerkameradscharführer
	Mitglied des Beirates
	Mitglied

== Notable Kyffhäuserverband members ==
- Ludwig Bergsträsser
- F. K. Otto Dibelius
- Martin Dibelius
- Johannes Dieckmann
- Hermann Ehlers
- Ferdinand Friedensburg
- Hans Fritzsche
- Heinrich George
- Hellmut von Gerlach
- Leo Geyr von Schweppenburg
- Helmut Hasse
- Richard Heinze
- Rudolf Heinze
- Otto Hoetzsch
- Hubertus, Prince of Löwenstein-Wertheim-Freudenberg
- Gerhard Kittel
- Werner Kollath
- Wilhelm Kube
- Hanfried Lenz
- Max Maurenbrecher
- Joachim Mrugowsky
- Ludwig Müller
- Friedrich Naumann
- Karl Ernst Osthaus
- Otto Peltzer
- Kurt Scharf
- Gustav Adolf Scheel
- Percy Ernst Schramm
- Rudi Stephan
- Otmar Freiherr von Verschuer
- Ernst Wahle
- Kuno von Westarp

== See also ==
- List of veterans organizations
- National Socialist War Victim's Care
- Der Stahlhelm

== Notes and references ==
- Kyffhäuserbund e.V.
- Kyffhäuser-Bund der Deutschen Landeskriegerverbände e.V. (Historisches Lexikon Bayerns).
- Dieter Fricke et al.: Kyffhäuser-Bund der Deutschen Landeskriegerverbände (KB) 1900-1943. In: Dieter Fricke (Hrsg.): Die bürgerlichen Parteien in Deutschland. Berlin 1968, S.296–312.
- Karl Saul: Der "Deutsche Kriegerbund". Zur innenpolitischen Funktion eines nationalen Verbandes im kaiserlichen Deutschland. In: Militärgeschichtliche Mitteilungen (MGM). 2/1969. S.95–159.
- Karl Führer: Der "Deutsche Reichskriegerbund Kyffhäuser" 1930-1934. Politik, Ideologie und Funktion eines "unpolitischen" Verbandes. In: Militärgeschichtliche Mitteilungen (MGM). 2/1984. S.57–76.
- Heinz Kleene Das Kriegervereinswesen im Emsland zur Zeit des Kaiserreiches In: Jahrbuch des Emsländ. Heimatbundes Sögel 2005. S.137–159.
