= VOD (disambiguation) =

VOD, or video on demand, is a media distribution system.

VOD, vod, Vod, or VoD may also refer to:

- Velocity of detonation, the speed of a shock wave through a detonated explosive
- Veno-occlusive disease, a complication of bone marrow transplantation
- Versant Object Database, a database management system
- Vision of Disorder, an American metalcore band
- Voice of Democracy, a Cambodian news outlet
- Voice of Democracy (scholarship), a scholarship program
- Vods, a Finnic ethnic group
  - Votic language, a Finnic language
- Vodafone Group (LSE & Nasdaq codes: VOD)
