= Veterans' Legion of Indonesia =

The Veterans' Legion of Indonesia (Indonesian: Legiun Veteran Republik Indonesia), established on 1 January 1957, is the national ex-service organisation of Indonesia, serving men and women veterans and veterans' families who previously served in the Indonesian National Armed Forces. It is governed by the Veterans of the Republic of Indonesia Law passed by the People's Representative Council on 3 August 1967. It is a member of the World Veterans Federation.

The VLI is mandated to serve the veterans who in the period of struggle and the period of defense of the independence of Indonesia struggled to take up arms to defend the independence and freedom of the Republic against foreign and domestic enemies threatening the national ideology of Pancasila and the territorial integrity of the state.

The legal basis of the VLI is Proclamation 103 of 1 January 1957 and the Veterans of the Republic of Indonesia Law of 3 August 1967, which serves as the official charter of the Legion.

== Mission-vision statement ==
As stated in the Veterans' Law of 1967, the Veterans' Legion is mandated to serve the needs of military veterans who have had actively contributed to the defence of the Republic on a voluntary basis required they are Indonesian citizens having served in uniform and under the colours who are classified into:

- those who as part of the INAF and affiliated and independent guerilla organizations and independence militias fought in the side of the Republic during the Indonesian National Revolution (1945-1950)
- those who served as part of the INAF who served during the period of regional rebellions (1950-1961), Operation Trikora (1960-1963), the Indonesia-Malaysia confrontation (1963-1969) and the Indonesian invasion of East Timor (1975) and its subsequent occupation (1975-1999)
- veterans and retired personnel of the INAF who served in peacetime national defence operations and in UN peacekeeping deployments abroad from 1957 until the present

== See also ==
- World Veterans Federation
- List of veterans organizations
