= Deutscher Kriegerbund =

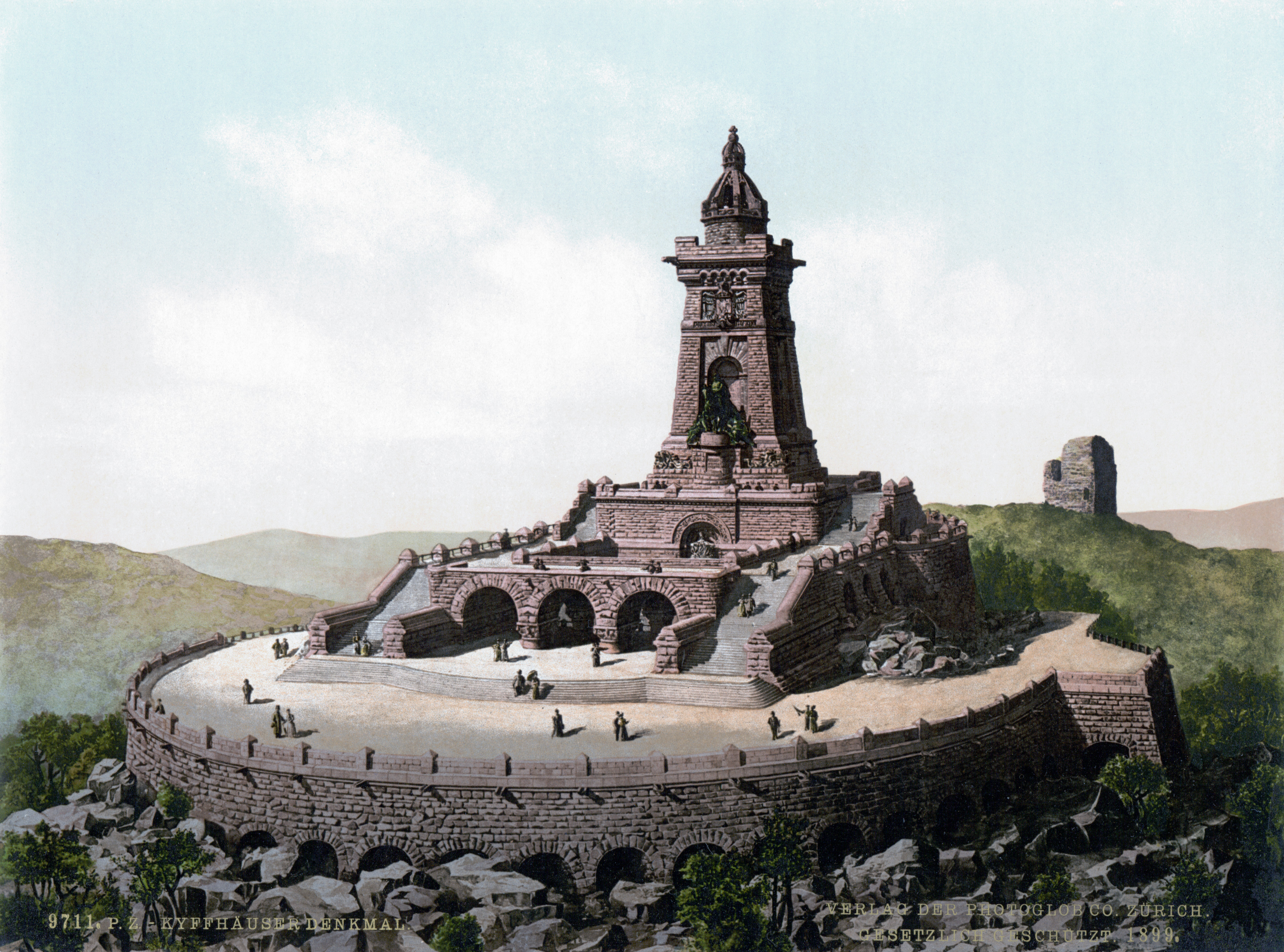
Kyffhäuser memorial around 1900

Deutscher Kriegerbund (English: German Warrior League) was a war veterans' and reservists' association in Germany established in April 1873 in Weißenfels.

Its origins lie in a Warrior Association established in 1786 by fusiliers of Frederick II of Prussia's army in Wangerin/Pomerania. The original purpose of the war veterans' associations was to provide their members and former soldiers with proper burial arrangements. Former soldiers felt the need of commemorative tombs that would preserve the dignity of their former comrades-in-arms and honor them even after their death. This type of association received a considerable boost after Prussia's victorious battles against the Danish (1864), Austrian (1866) and French armies in 1871.

A number of these veterans' associations established the Deutscher Kriegerbund by joining efforts for a common cause in 1873. In April 1897, the Deutscher Kriegerbund became the Prussian Country's Warrior League (German: Preußischer Landeskriegerverband). Its former name Deutscher Kriegerbund was kept for certain economic and social dealings. In this form, it was a forerunner of later German military social welfare provisions like the National Socialist War Victim's Care. Since it was initially dominated by groups of soldiers of the former Prussian army, local veterans' associations of Bavaria, Saxony, Württemberg, Hessen and Baden preferred to remain out of its circle. The Deutscher Kriegerbund began the efforts to build a memorial that would honor and represent the German warriors in 1888.

This monument, located on top of the 473 m high Kyffhäuser mountain, was finally inaugurated on 16 June 1896. The building of the memorial pleased and inspired the other German war veterans' associations who had been reluctant to join the Deutscher Kriegerbund. As a result of this change of attitude, the steps to form a wider organization were taken in 1900 and the Kyffhäuserbund was formed. This inclusive organization integrated the formerly scattered German war veterans' associations, which had been one of the main aims of the Deutscher Kriegerbund.

== Related organizations ==
- Bayerischer Soldatenbund 1874
- Kyffhäuserbund

== See also ==
- List of veterans organizations
- National Socialist War Victim's Care

== Notes and references ==
- Kyffhäuserbund e.V.
- Kyffhäuser-Bund der Deutschen Landeskriegerverbände e.V. (Historisches Lexikon Bayerns).
- Dieter Fricke et al.: Kyffhäuser-Bund der Deutschen Landeskriegerverbände (KB) 1900-1943. In: Dieter Fricke (Hrsg.): Die bürgerlichen Parteien in Deutschland. Berlin 1968, S.296–312.
- Karl Saul: Der "Deutsche Kriegerbund". Zur innenpolitischen Funktion eines nationalen Verbandes im kaiserlichen Deutschland. In: Militärgeschichtliche Mitteilungen (MGM). 2/1969. S.95–159.
- Karl Führer: Der "Deutsche Reichskriegerbund Kyffhäuser" 1930-1934. Politik, Ideologie und Funktion eines "unpolitischen" Verbandes. In: Militärgeschichtliche Mitteilungen (MGM). 2/1984. S.57–76.
- Heinz Kleene Das Kriegervereinswesen im Emsland zur Zeit des Kaiserreiches In: Jahrbuch des Emsländ. Heimatbundes Sögel 2005. S.137–159.
