= Cowtown Marathon =

Marathon held in Fort Worth, Texas, US

The Cowtown Marathon is an annual marathon held every last weekend in February in Fort Worth, Texas. The two-day activities include two 5Ks, a 10K, the half marathon, marathon and ultra marathon.

The Cowtown Marathon was founded by the University of North Texas Health Science Center in 1978, with proceeds benefiting local charities and non-profit organizations. The Cowtown Children's Activities for Life & Fitness Program provides training, grants and running shoes to children in need. Current non-profits include the American Cancer Society, the Leukemia & Lymphoma Society, and Team RWB which is a support organization for wounded veterans and their families. The program gave away 5,000 pairs of new running shoes to children in 2017.

The races start and end in Fort Worth's cultural district, run through the Stockyards, go through downtown and circle TCU and Fort Worth's southside. Elevation changes can range up to 150 ft.

The Cowtown marathon and ultra marathon are Boston Marathon qualifying events. The Cowtown Cook Children's 5K race was named the top kids running event in the nation by USA Running, with 5,300 children registered to run in 2012.

== Notable events ==
In 2012 Scott Downard of Norman, Oklahoma, finished first in the Cowtown marathon by outrunning his competitors by more than six minutes. However, Downard was disqualified because he was not registered and he was wearing another person's bib. Runner-up Kolin Styles became the winner. Styles' brother Koby won the ultra marathon.

In 2014 Michael Wardian, a four-time USA Track and Field Ultra Runner of the Year, sped around the 31-mile course in 3 hours and 21 minutes, shattering the course record by slightly more than 10 minutes.

In 2016, Elizabeth Northern of Fort Worth, TX finished the Ultra Marathon in 3:21:04, beating the previous course record by over 30 minutes.

In 2023 The Cowtown Marathon hosted the USATF National Half Marathon Championships. Jacob Thompson won the men's division with a time of 1:02:38. Aliphine Tuliamuk won the women's division with a time of 1:09:37.
