= Veterans Awards =

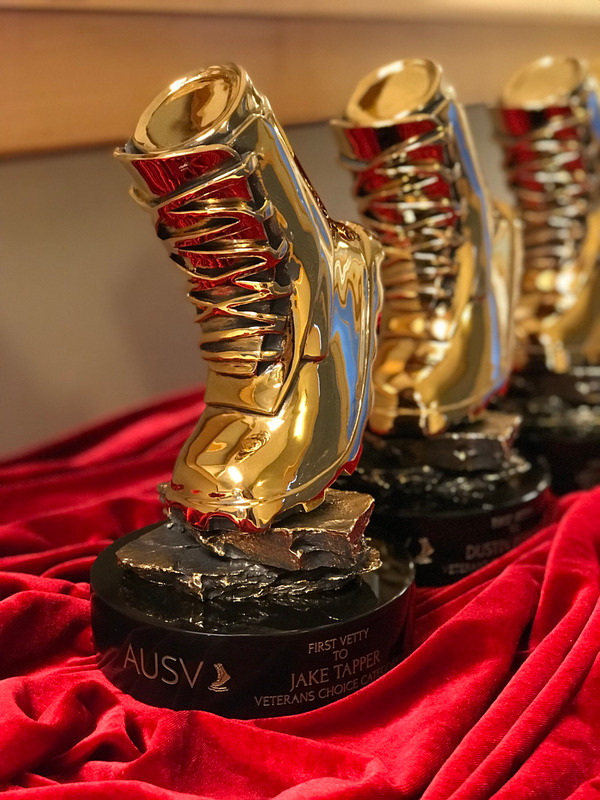
A "Vetty" trophy, which is handed out to winners of the Veterans Awards. Awarded for Excellence in Public Service Country United States Presented by Academy of United States Veterans

The Veterans Awards, also known as the Vettys, is an annual award ceremony presented by the Academy of United States Veterans. The awards honor members of the veteran community in the United States in various categories, such as leadership, employment, and education. The Vettys was founded and established by a combat veterans of the United States Army, Assal Ravandi in 2015.

The 2018 awards were hosted by Jake Tapper. Celebrities such as Shohreh Aghdashloo, Montel Williams, Anne Heche, Mike Vogel and Sophia Pernas attended. The event was also attended by White House Chief of Staff John Kelly and Senator Dan Sullivan.

In 2019 Jake Tapper returned to host the 4th Vettys at the historic Watergate Hotel. Celebrity presenters included Academy Awards winning actor, Casey Affleck, Emmy winning actress, Shohreh Aghdashloo and Ian Bohen. Nate Boyer hosted the nominees reception the night before the ceremony.

The Fourth Annual Veterans Awards was held on January 20, 2019, and feature awards in the categories of Lifetime Achievement, Veterans Choice, Mental Health, the Lt. Michael P. Murphy Award (for education), Leadership, LGBTQ, Employment, Veteran Homelessness, Women Veterans, and Art of Impact. The ceremony will be held at the Watergate Hotel. The 3rd Annual Vettys was covered by both local and national media.

In 2021, serious questions arose as to organization's integrity, financial practices, and actual impact among veterans as detailed in a Task & Purpose investigation.
