= Veterans of Foreign Wars =

Organization of U.S. war veterans

Veterans of Foreign Wars of the United States
- The VFW's logo since 2018

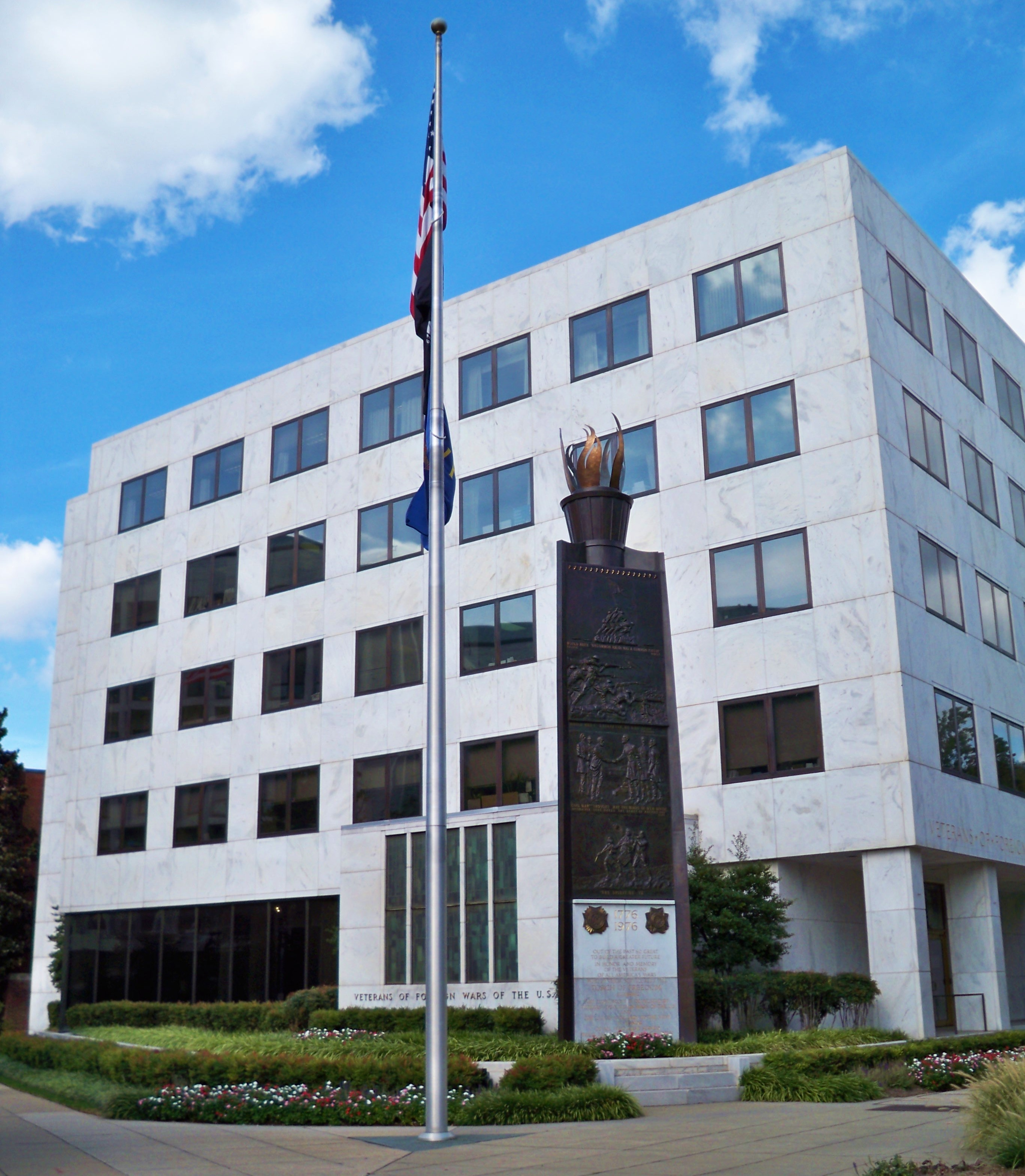
- Washington Memorial Building; Washington, D.C., United States
- Abbreviation: VFW
- Established: September 29, 1899 (127 years ago)
- Founder: James C. Putnam
- Founded at: Columbus, Ohio, U.S.
- Merger of: American Veterans of Foreign Service (organized on September 29, 1899, at Columbus, Ohio, U.S.) and the Army of the Philippines (organized on December 12, 1899, at Denver, Colorado, U.S., as the Colorado Society, Army of the Philippines)
- Type: 501(c)(19), war veterans' organization
- Tax ID no.: 44-0474290
- Purpose: Fraternal, patriotic, historical, charitable, and educational
- Headquarters: 406 West 34th Street, Kansas City, Missouri, U.S.
- Coordinates: 39°04′01″N 94°35′27″W
- Region served: Worldwide
- Members: 1.3 million including Auxiliary (2025)
- Official language: English
- Commander in Chief: Carol Whitmore (IA); Since August 13, 2025
- Senior Vice Commander in Chief: Cory Geisler; Since August 13, 2025
- Junior Vice Commander in Chief: Glenn Umberger; Since August 13, 2025
- National Council of Administration: 63 voting members: 8 elected officers; 3 appointed officers; 52 elected members
- Main organ: VFW National Convention
- Subsidiaries: Military Order of the Cootie; VFW Auxiliary; VFW Foundation; VFW National Home; VFW National Riders
- Affiliations: Student Veterans of America
- Revenue: US$98,724,340 (2015)
- Expenses: US$89,099,521 (2015)
- Employees: 224 (2014)
- Volunteers: 3,000 (2014)
- Website: www.vfw.org
- Formerly called: Army of the Philippines, Cuba and Puerto Rico

The Veterans of Foreign Wars of the United States (VFW), is an organization of United States war veterans who fought in wars, campaigns, and expeditions on foreign land, waters, or airspace as military service members. Established on September 29, 1899, in Columbus, Ohio, the VFW is headquartered in Kansas City, Missouri. It was federally chartered in 1936.

== History ==
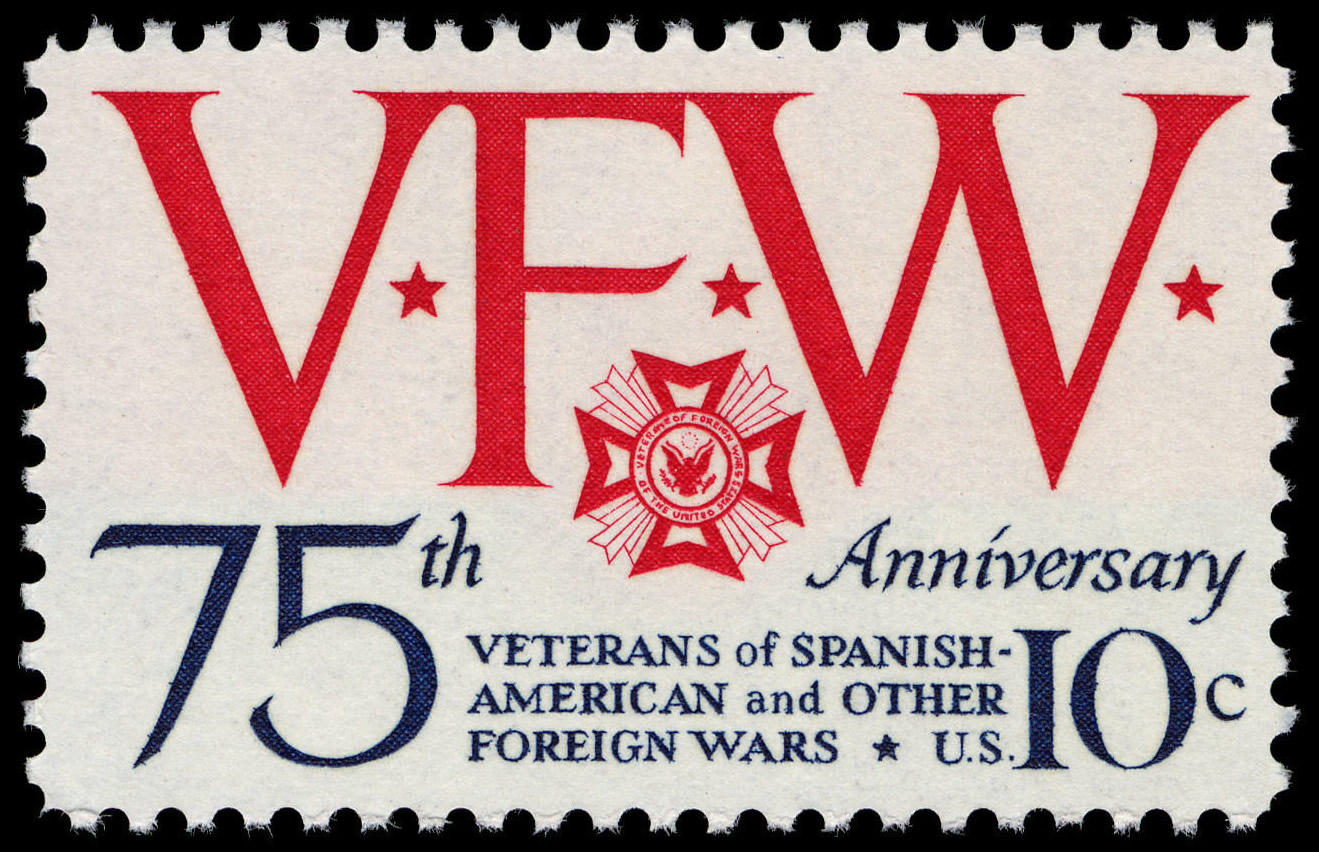
75th Anniversary 10c postage stamp (1974)

The VFW resulted from the amalgamation of several societies formed immediately following the Spanish–American War. In 1899, little groups of veterans returning from campaigning in Cuba and the Philippine Islands, founded local societies upon a spirit of comradeship known only to those who faced the dangers of that war side by side. Similar experiences and a common language drew them together. The American Veterans of Foreign Service (predecessor to the Veterans of Foreign Wars of the United States) was established in Columbus, Ohio, September 29, 1899, by Spanish‑American War veteran James C. Putnam. The Colorado Society, Army of the Philippines, was organized in Denver, Colorado, on December 12, 1899, by General Irving Hale of Denver, Colorado. Shortly thereafter, a society known as the Foreign Service Veterans was born in Pittsburgh, Pennsylvania in October 1901. The Ohio-based group and the Pittsburgh-based group held a joint convention in 1905, where the two groups merged. Merging the final two groups was talked about as early as 1908 but was not accomplished until 1913. In August 1913 an encampment was held in Denver and they merged their interests and identities in a national organization now known as the VFW.

== Purpose ==
The purpose of the VFW is to speed rehabilitation of the nation's disabled and needy veterans, assist veterans' widows and orphans and the dependents of needy or disabled veterans, and promote Americanism by means of education in patriotism and by constructive service to local communities. The organization maintains both its legislative service and central office of its national rehabilitation service in Washington, D.C. The latter nationwide program serves disabled veterans of all wars, members and nonmembers alike, in matters of government compensation and pension claims, hospitalization, civil-service employment preference, etc."

== Iconography ==
=== Logo ===
Redesigned in November 2018, the official logo of the VFW includes an artistic representation of service stripes, easily recognizable insignia indicative of military service. Worn on most service uniforms, they denote length of service. As such, the first and leaner of the two service stripes represents the VFW's entry into its second century of service to America's veterans, service members and their families. The second, broader stripe represents its first century of service, spanning back to 1899.

=== Great Seal ===
The Cross of Malta is the VFW's official emblem. The cross, radiating rays, and Great Seal of the United States together symbolize the character, vows and purposes distinguishing VFW as an order of warriors who have traveled far from home to defend sacred principles. Its eight points represent the beatitudes prescribed in the Sermon on the Mount: Blessed are the poor in spirit, the meek, the pure, the merciful, the peacemakers; blessed are they who mourn, seek righteousness and are persecuted for righteousness' sake. The eight-pointed Cross of Malta harks back to the Crusades, launched during the 12th century.

== Eligibility ==
Membership in the VFW is restricted to any active or honorably discharged officer or enlisted person who is a citizen of the United States and who has served in its armed forces "in any foreign war, insurrection or expedition, which service shall be recognized by the authorization or the issuance of a United States military campaign medal."

The following is a list of U.S. campaign medals, ribbons, and badges used by the Veterans of Foreign Wars of the United States to determine membership eligibility.

Eligibility guide

Campaign medal	Start date	End date
Navy Expeditionary	February 12, 1874	Open
Marine Corps Expeditionary	February 12, 1874	Open
Spanish Campaign	April 20, 1898	December 10, 1898
Army of Cuban Occupation	July 18, 1898	May 20, 1902
Army of Puerto Rican Occupation	August 14, 1898	December 10, 1898
Philippine Campaign	February 4, 1899	December 31, 1913
China Relief Expedition	April 5, 1900	May 27, 1901
Cuban Pacification	September 12, 1906	April 1, 1909
Mexican Service	April 12, 1911	June 16, 1919
First Nicaraguan Campaign	July 29, 1912	November 14, 1912
Haitian Campaign	April 9, 1915	June 15, 1920
Dominican Campaign	May 4, 1916	December 5, 1916
World War I Victory (with battle or service clasp – including Siberia and European Russia)	April 6, 1917	April 1, 1920
Army of Occupation of Germany	November 12, 1918	July 11, 1923
Second Nicaraguan Campaign	August 27, 1926	January 2, 1933
Yangtze Service	September 3, 1926	December 31, 1932
China Service	July 7, 1937	April 1, 1957
American Defense Service (with foreign service clasp)	September 8, 1939	December 7, 1941
Combat Infantryman Badge	December 6, 1941	Open
Combat Medical Badge	December 6, 1941	Open
Navy Combat Action	December 6, 1941	Open
European–African–Middle Eastern Campaign	December 7, 1941	November 8, 1945
American Campaign (30 consecutive or 60 non-consecutive days of duty outside continental limits of the U.S.)	December 7, 1941	March 2, 1946
Asiatic–Pacific Campaign	December 7, 1941	March 2, 1946
Navy Occupation Service	May 8, 1945	October 25, 1955
Army of Occupation (30 consecutive days of duty)	May 9, 1945	October 2, 1990
Korean Service	June 27, 1950	July 27, 1954
Korea Defense Service	July 28, 1954	Open
Vietnam Service	July 1, 1958	April 30, 1975
Armed Forces Expeditionary	July 1, 1958	Open
SSBN Deterrent Patrol insignia, in silver and gold	January 21, 1961	Open
Coast Guard Combat Action	May 1, 1975	Open
Southwest Asia Service	August 2, 1990	November 30, 1995
Air Force Expeditionary Service (with gold border)	October 1, 1999	Open
Kosovo Campaign	March 24, 1999	December 31, 2013
Global War on Terrorism Expeditionary	September 11, 2001	Open
Afghanistan Campaign	September 11, 2001	August 31, 2021
Air Force Combat Action	September 11, 2001	Open
Combat Action Badge	September 18, 2001	Open
Iraq Campaign	March 19, 2003	December 31, 2011
Inherent Resolve Campaign	June 15, 2014	Open

=== Refusal to admit WWII Japanese American veterans ===
Despite their distinguished record, many posts and departments refused Japanese-American veterans entry into the VFW. In Chicago, white officers from the 442nd RCT advocated for a group's charter to form a segregated American Legion post in 1946. In Sacramento, California, another group found Alva Fleming, a sympathetic member in VFW district leadership who approved the charter of Nisei VFW Post 8985 on 7 February 1947. Fleming would go on to become State Commander for the Department of California, and considered to be the driving force in the founding of a total of 14 Nisei VFW posts throughout California, posts 8985 in Sacramento, Monterey post 1629, Gardena post 1961, Garden Grove post 3670, San Fernando post 4140, San Diego post 4851, Hanford post 5869, Oceanside post 6945, Fresno post 8499, Watsonville post 9446, San Francisco post 9879, East Los Angeles post 9902, Los Angeles post 9938, and San Jose post 9970, all still active today. Nisei veterans in the Pacific Northwest were not so lucky, unable to find anyone willing to do the same there despite letters of support from Colonel Virgil R. Miller and General Lucian Truscott. Although VFW national commanders Jean Brunner and Joseph Stack condemned the actions of local posts, their bylaws at the time promoted autonomy in individual posts and were powerless to prevent the discrimination. They could only offer them membership as members-at-large. Unwilling to be treated as a second class members, the PNW Nisei decided to form their own independent veterans organization when neither the VFW or the American Legion would accept them as members nor grant them charters for a segregated post.

=== Vietnam veterans membership controversy ===
The VFW initially refused membership for Vietnam War veterans. At the time, most incumbent VFW members were World War II and Korean War veterans. Many of these WWII veterans were of the opinion that the conflict in Vietnam was a "police action" and in their minds did not qualify as a war, despite the Korean War also being a "police action", along with the American Civil War which also had no formal declaration of war. This rationale was used to deny membership to many Vietnam War veterans across the country. Many of these WWII veterans blamed Vietnam War veterans for losing the war. In the years since, many veterans of the Vietnam War have refused to join the VFW due to this, and many older posts now find themselves struggling to survive as WWII and Korea vets have either died or are no longer active, and younger Iraq and Afghanistan veterans do not feel comfortable joining a dying post.

== Membership and structure ==
The VFW attained a peak membership of 2.1 million between 1991-1993. In 2023, the VFW had 957,000 members. In 2024, the VFW combined auxiliary members into their membership totals. In December 2025, membership including the auxiliary stood at 1.3 million located at 5,556 posts worldwide.

== Support and assistance programs ==
The VFW offers a wide range of assistance programs aimed at helping veterans of every generation. This includes providing free, professional help filing or appealing a VA claim, offering scholarships for post-secondary education or providing emergency financial relief.

=== VA claims and separation assistance ===
The VFW's National Veterans Service program consists of a nationwide network of VA accredited service officers and pre-discharge representatives who are experts in dealing with the VA. The VA reports veterans represented by the VFW have recouped $8.3 billion in earned benefits, including $1.4 billion in new claims in 2018.

=== Pre-discharge ===
VFW Pre-Discharge representatives guide military personnel through the veterans claims process and conduct physical examinations prior to their separation from active duty. They also answer questions about education and medical benefits, as well as VA home loans.

=== Student veteran support ===
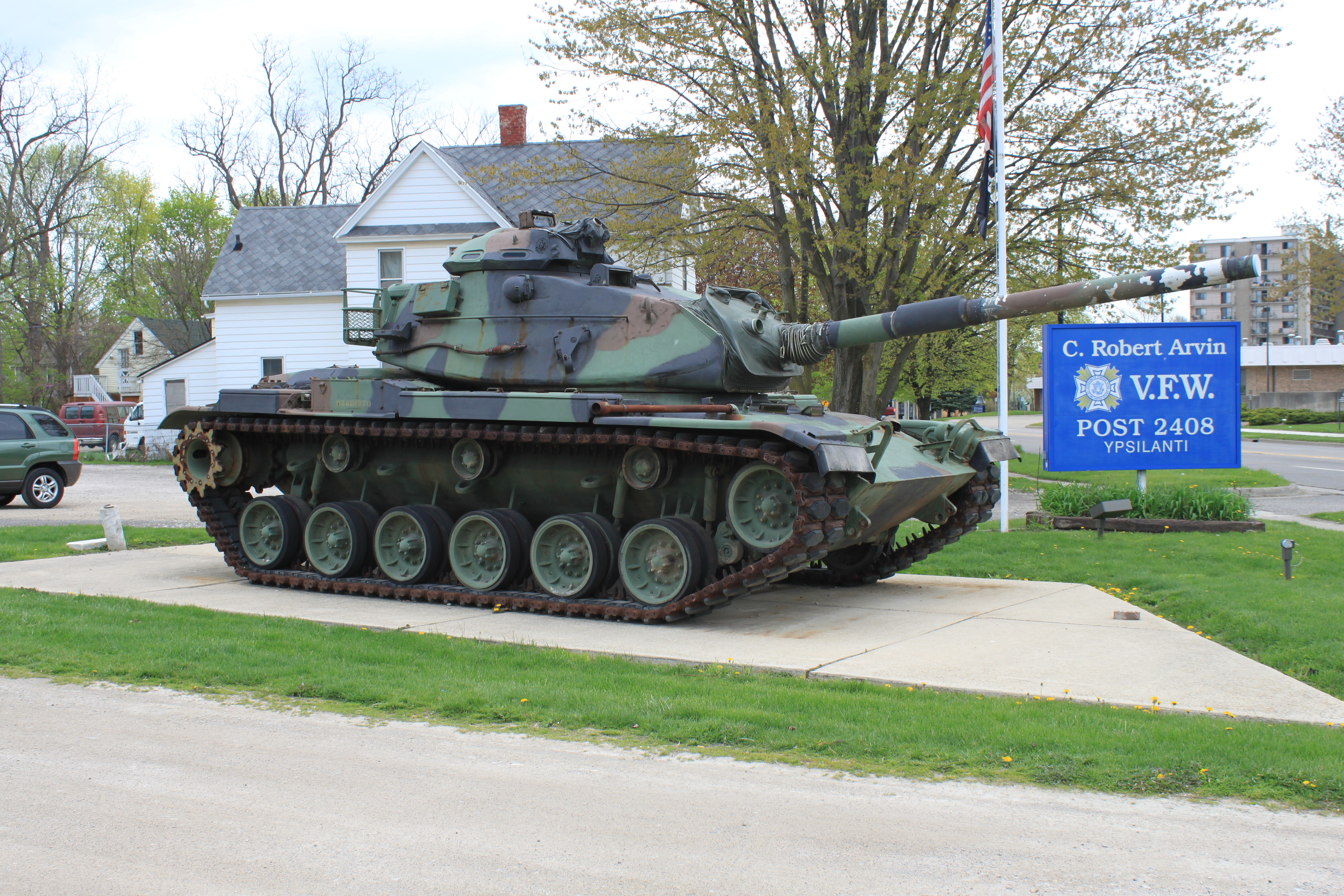
M60 Main Battle Tank on display in front of C. Robert Arvin Post No. 2408, Veterans of Foreign Wars, at Ypsilanti, Michigan (2010)

The VFW's Help A Hero Scholarship was established in 2014 to provide service members and veterans with financial assistance they need to complete their educational goals without incurring excessive U.S. student loan debt.

The VFW, in conjunction with the Student Veterans of America (SVA), have developed the 1 Student Veteran program. The program helps ensure student veterans receive their benefits in a timely manner, and offers direct assistance to student veterans who have questions or are experiencing problems accessing their VA benefits.

The VFW-SVA Legislative Fellowship grants ten student veterans (fellows) to join the VFW legislative team on Capitol Hill during the VFW Legislative Conference. The fellows can discuss with their legislators about the issues facing today's student veterans and meet with policy-makers from federal agencies responsible for implementing veterans' policy.

=== Veterans and Military Support Programs ===
The VFW's Veterans & Military Support Programs focus on troop support, and it includes three long-standing programs; Operation Uplink, Unmet Needs, and the Military Assistance Program (MAP).

- Military Assistance Program: This program promotes VFW interaction within the local military community through the Adopt-A-Unit Program. MAP Grants are available to posts, districts, and departments who participate in a variety of morale boosting functions such as farewell and welcome home events.
- Operation Uplink: This program keeps military members in contact with their family by allowing deployed troops to call home at no charge from MWR internet cafés in Afghanistan, Kuwait and other locations around the world. Operation Uplink also distributes "virtual pins" which enable wounded warriors and veterans in Veterans Affairs facilities to call from home at no cost.
- Unmet Needs: This program assists military service members and their families who run into financial difficulties as a result of deployment or other hardships directly related to military service. Assistance is in the form of a grant of up to US$1,500. It also assists with basic life needs such as mortgage, rent, home and auto repairs, insurance, utilities, food and clothing.

== Programs ==
The VFW promotes civic responsibility, patriotism, and supports youth and local programs in communities across America.

=== Voice of Democracy ===
Voice of Democracy logo

Each year, nearly 40,000 high school students from across the country enter to win a share of the US$2.1 million in educational scholarships and incentives awarded through the VFW's Voice of Democracy audio-essay competition. The national first-place winner receives a $35,000 scholarship.

=== Patriot's Pen ===
Patriot's Pen challenges students from grades 6-8, to enter to win one of 46 national awards totaling US$55,000, as well as $5,000 and an all-expense-paid trip to Washington, D.C. for the national first-place winner. Students draft a 300-400-word essay, expressing their views based on a patriotic, annual theme chosen by the VFW Commander in Chief.

=== Scout of the Year ===
Scout of the Year selects three young people – of the Boy or Girl Scouts, Sea Scouts or Venturing Crew – who have demonstrated practical citizenship in school, scouting and the community. The first-place winner receives a US$5,000 award, the second-place winner receives a US$3,000 award and the third-place winner receives US$1,000.

=== Teacher of the Year ===
Teacher of the Year recognizes three exceptional teachers for their outstanding commitment to teach Americanism and patriotism to their students. The VFW recognizes the nation's top classroom elementary, junior high and high school teachers who teach citizenship education topics – at least half of the school day in a classroom environment – and promote America's history, traditions and institutions effectively.

=== Community service ===
The VFW host events across America, as well as giving grants and helping at large-scale volunteer events.

== Publications ==
The VFW has published the monthly VFW Magazine since January 1951. It was known as Foreign Service from 1914 to 50.

== Notable commanders ==
Notable national commanders of the Veterans of Foreign Wars have included:

- Lyall T. Beggs
- Robert Coontz
- Thomas S. Crago
- Irving Hale
- Tillinghast L. Huston
- Bernard W. Kearney
- Rice W. Means
- Richard L. Roudebush
- James E. Van Zandt

== Notable members ==
Notable members of the Veterans of Foreign Wars of the United States include:

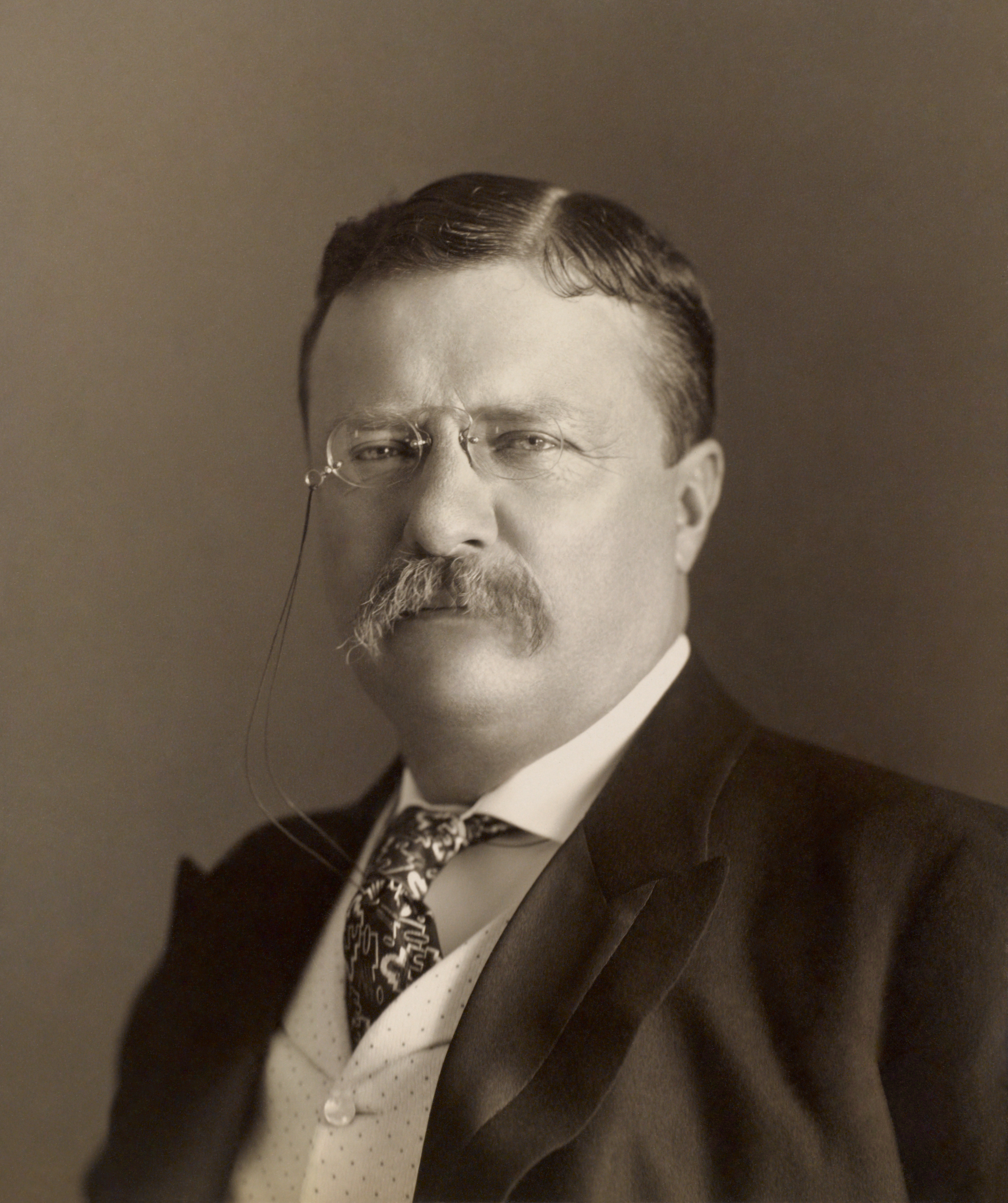
Theodore Roosevelt, 26th President of the United States

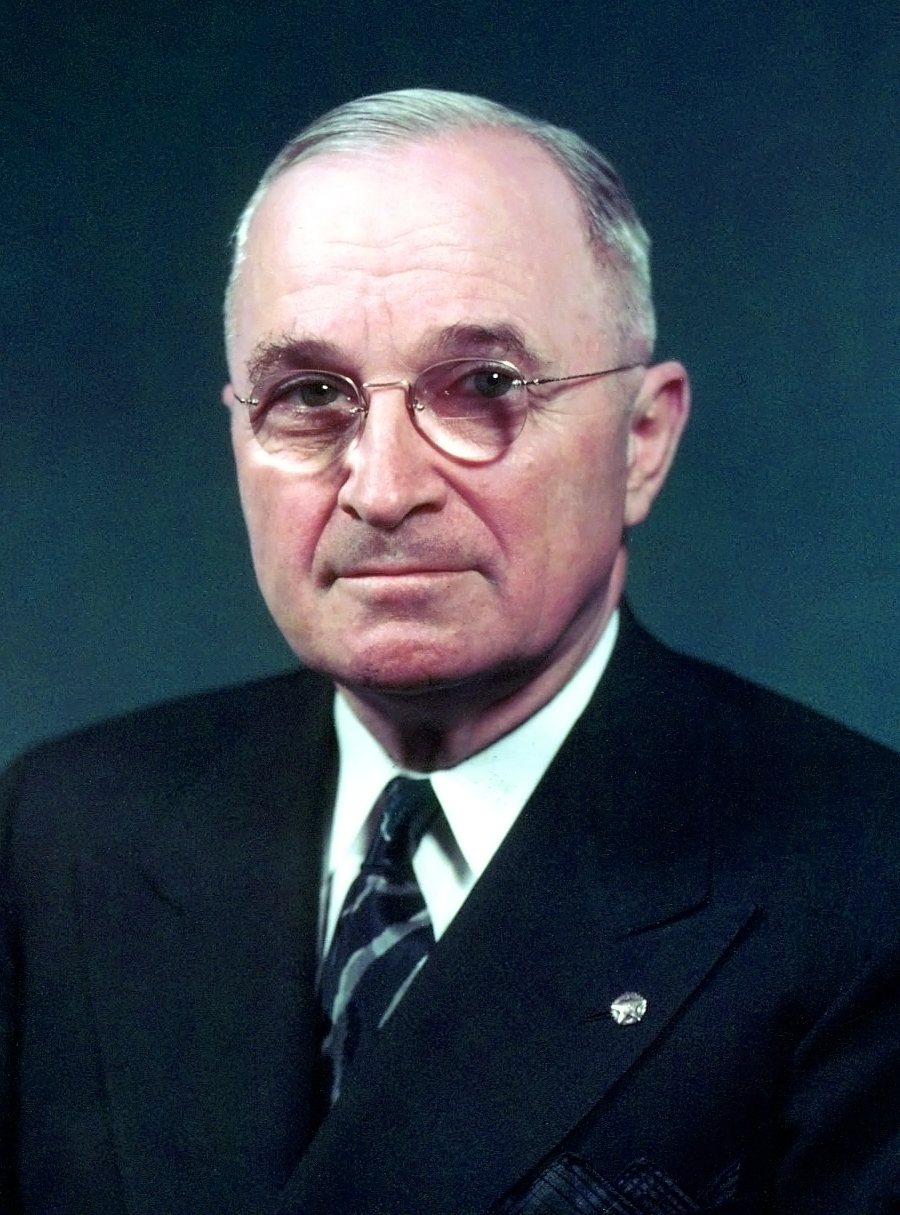
Harry Truman, 33rd President of the United States

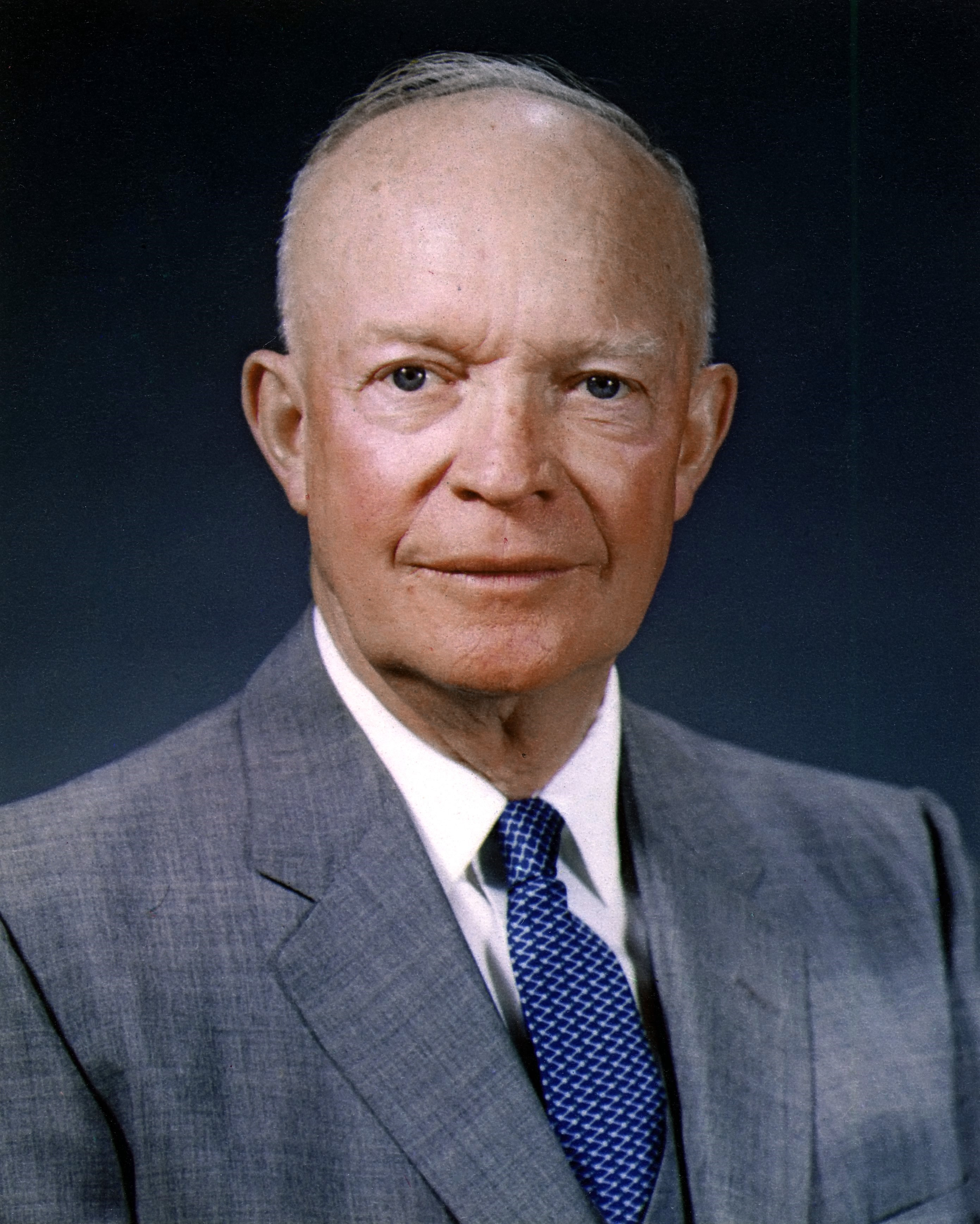
Dwight Eisenhower, 34th President of the United States

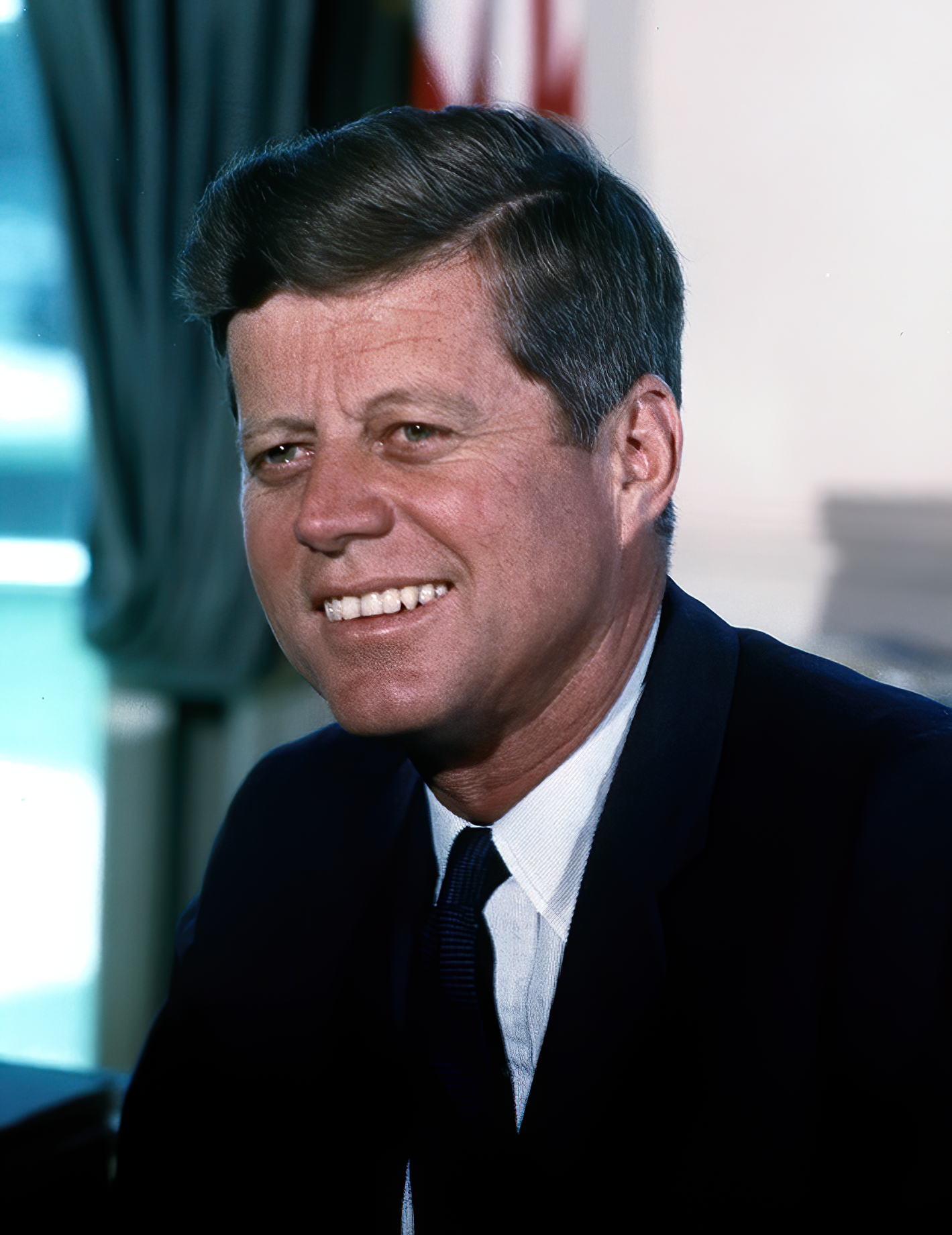
John Kennedy, 35th President of the United States

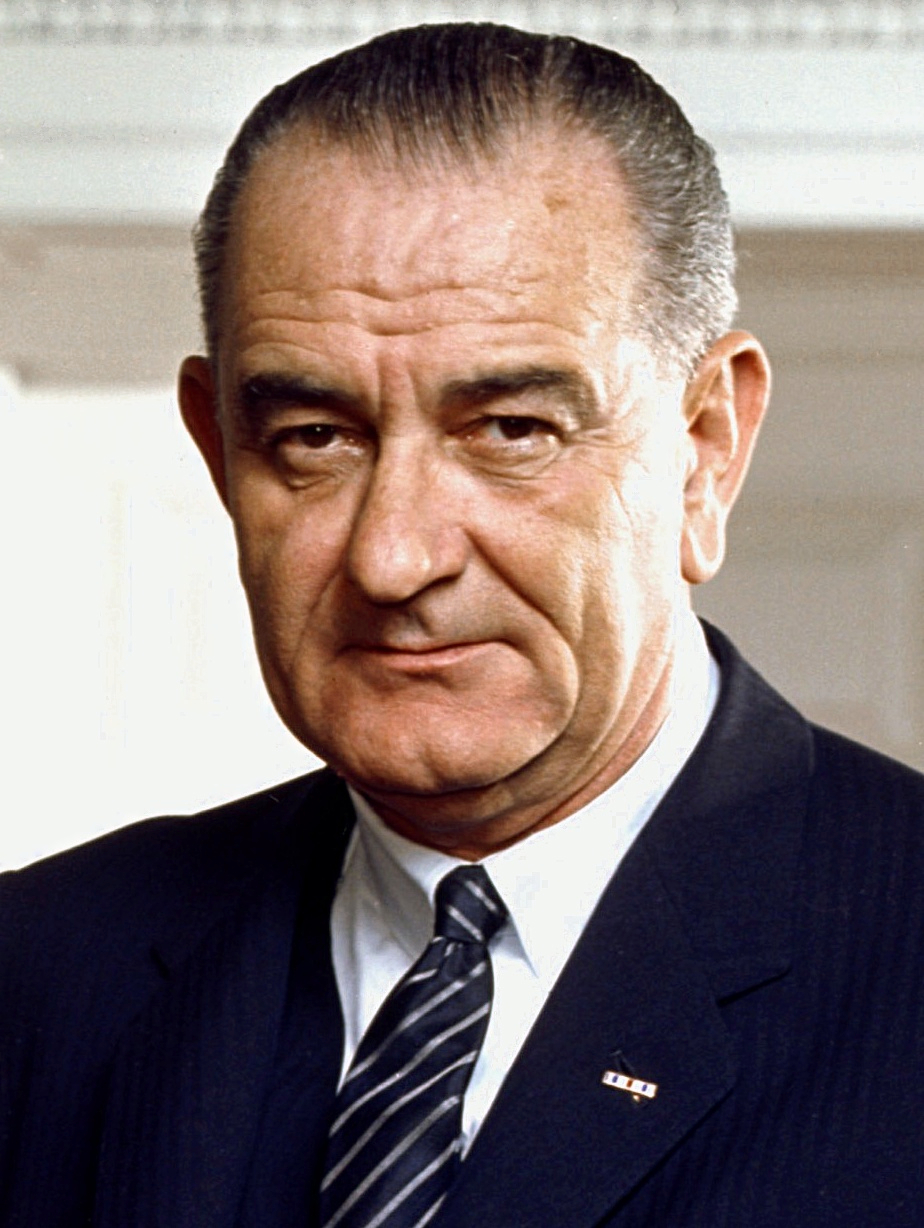
Lyndon Johnson, 36th President of the United States

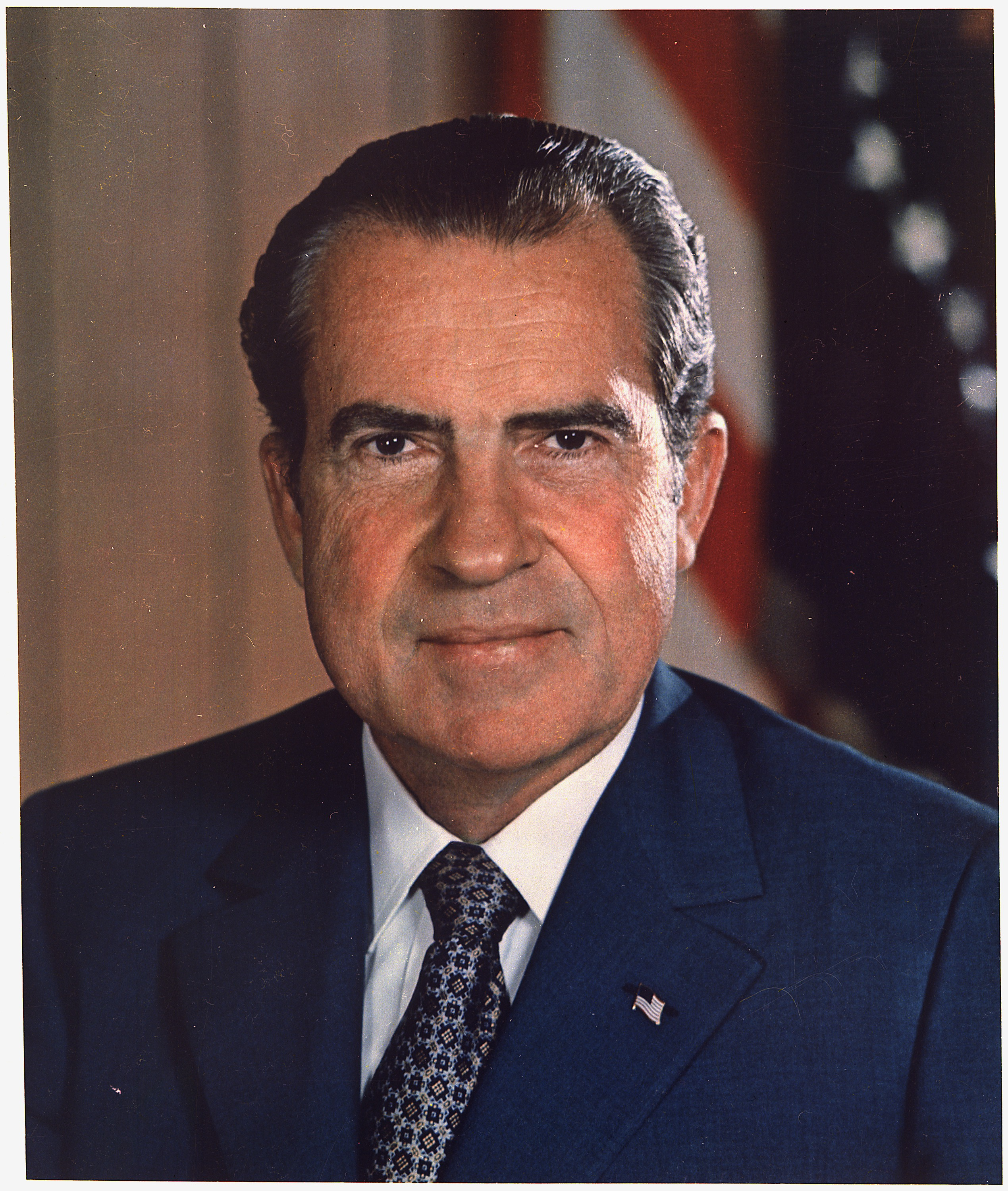
Richard Nixon, 37th President of the United States

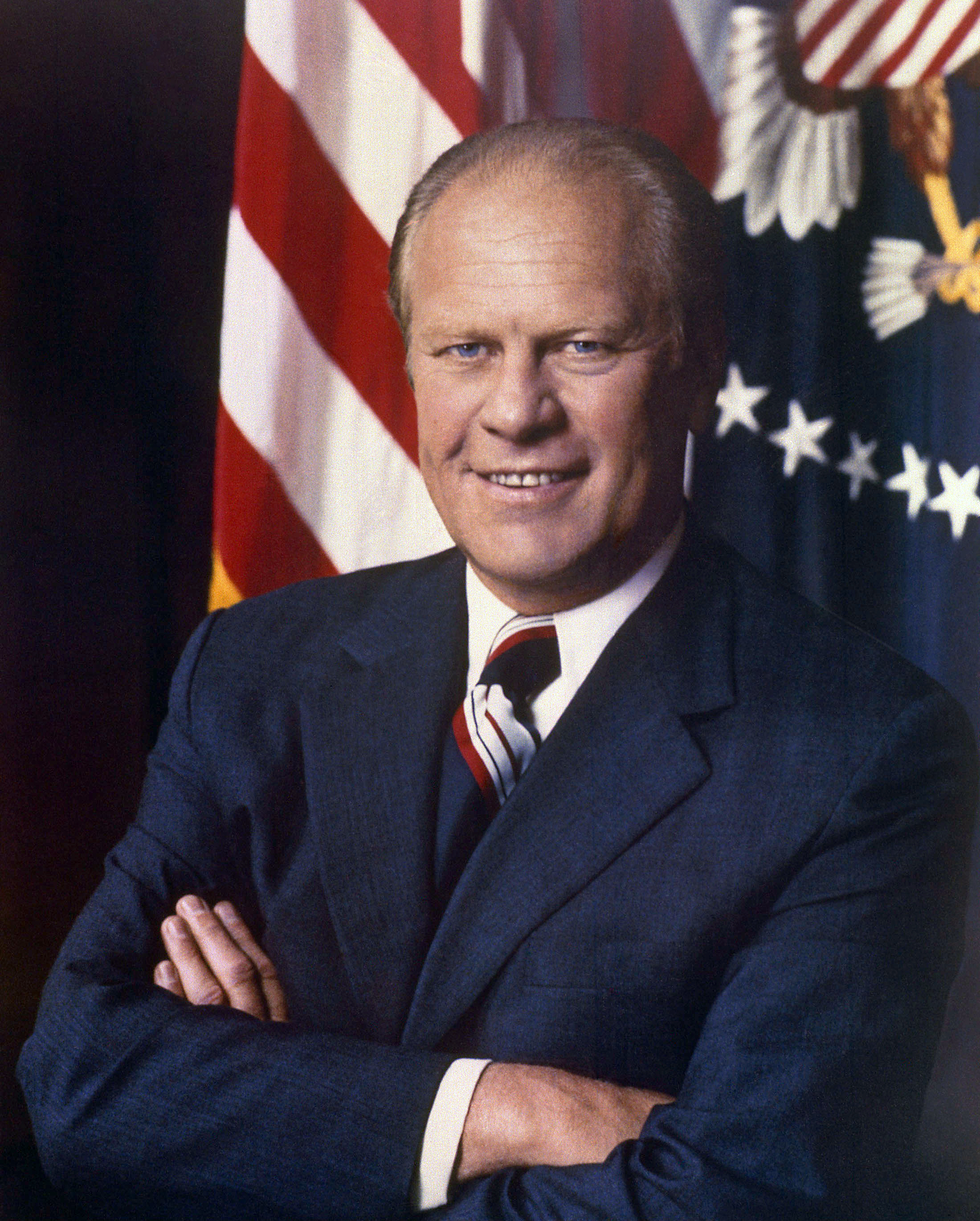
Gerald Ford, 38th President of the United States

George Bush, 41st President of the United States

Albert Gore Jr., 45th Vice President of the United States

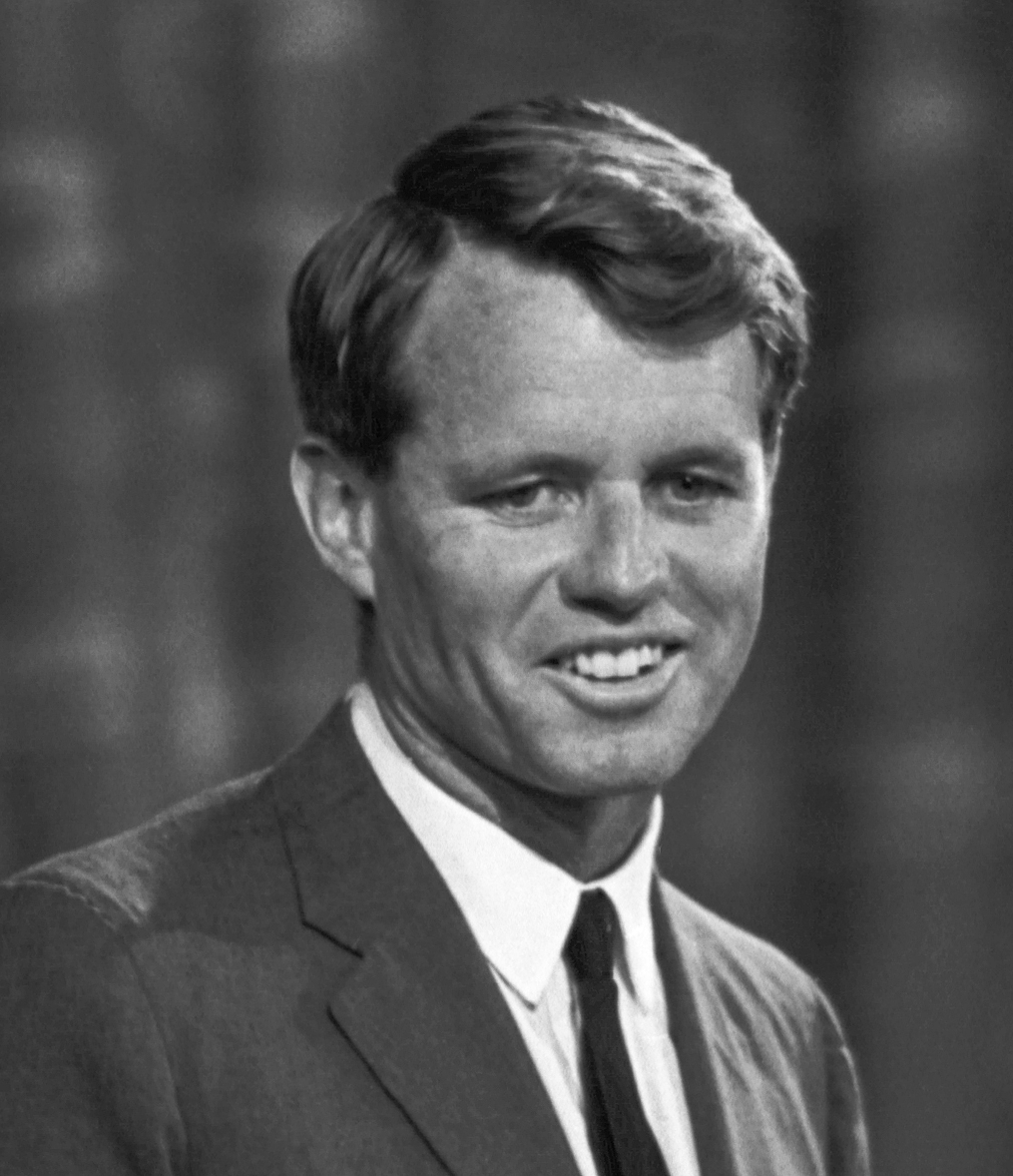
Robert Kennedy, United States Senator from New York

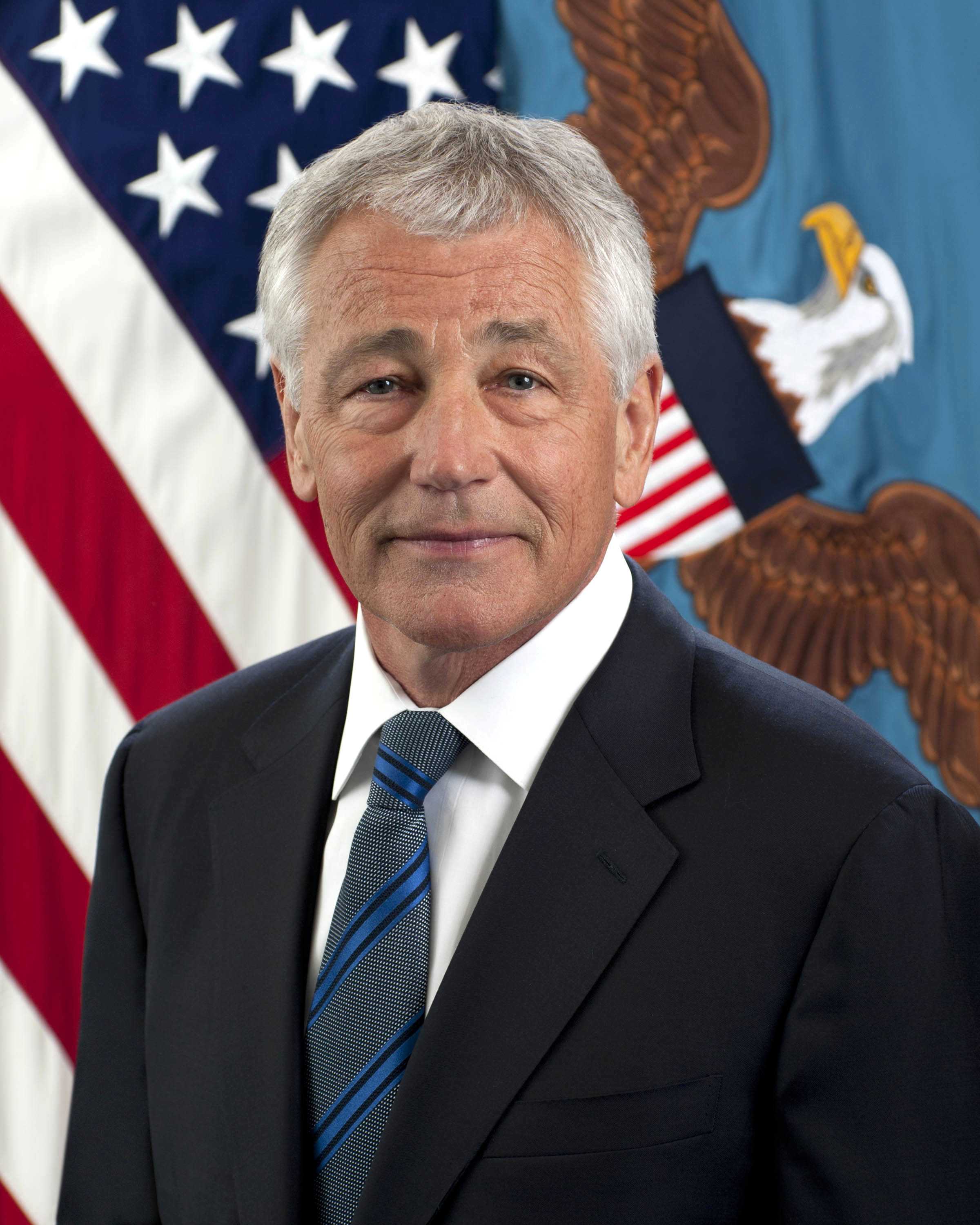
Chuck Hagel, 24th United States Secretary of Defense

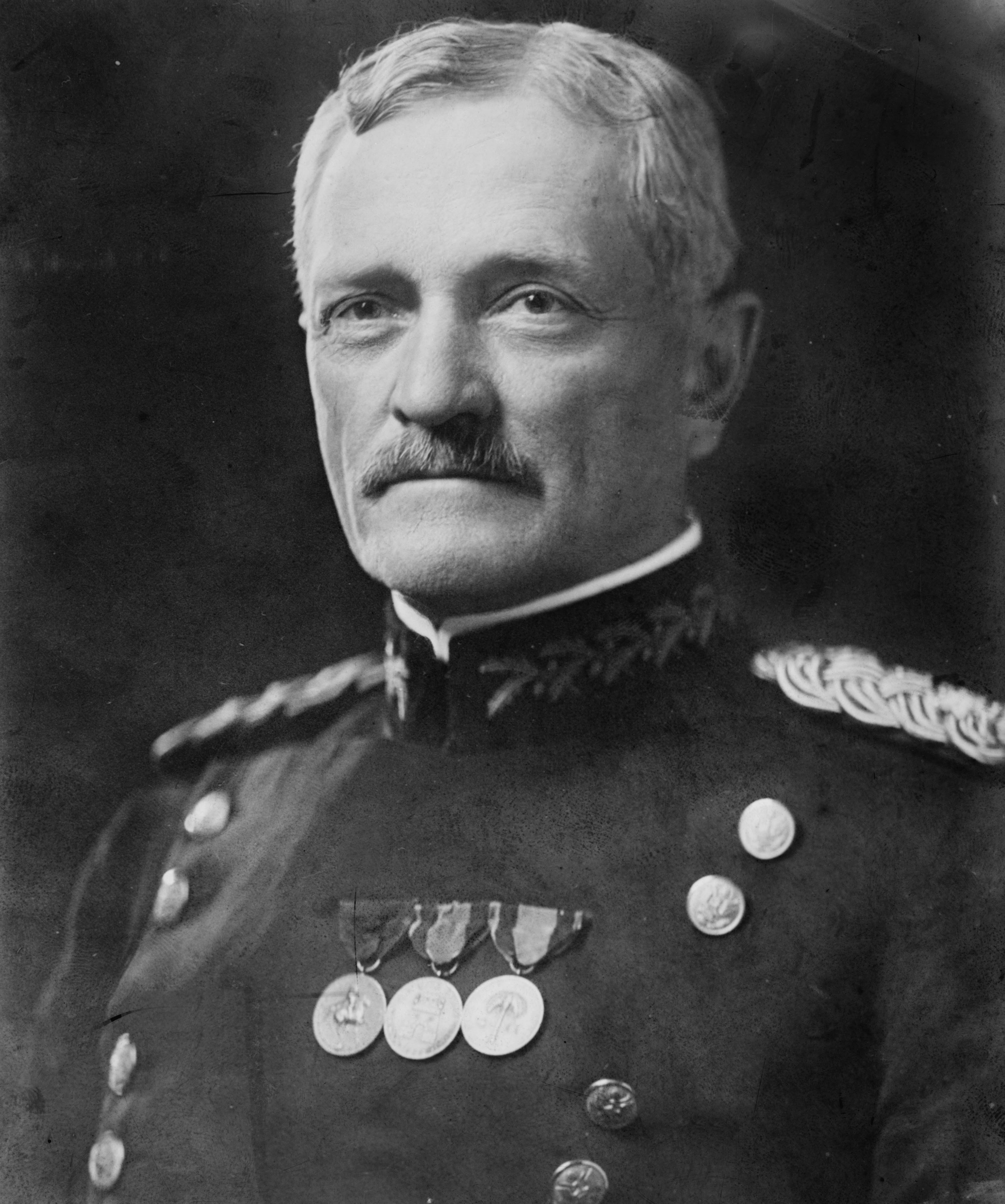
General John Pershing, 10th Chief of Staff of the United States Army

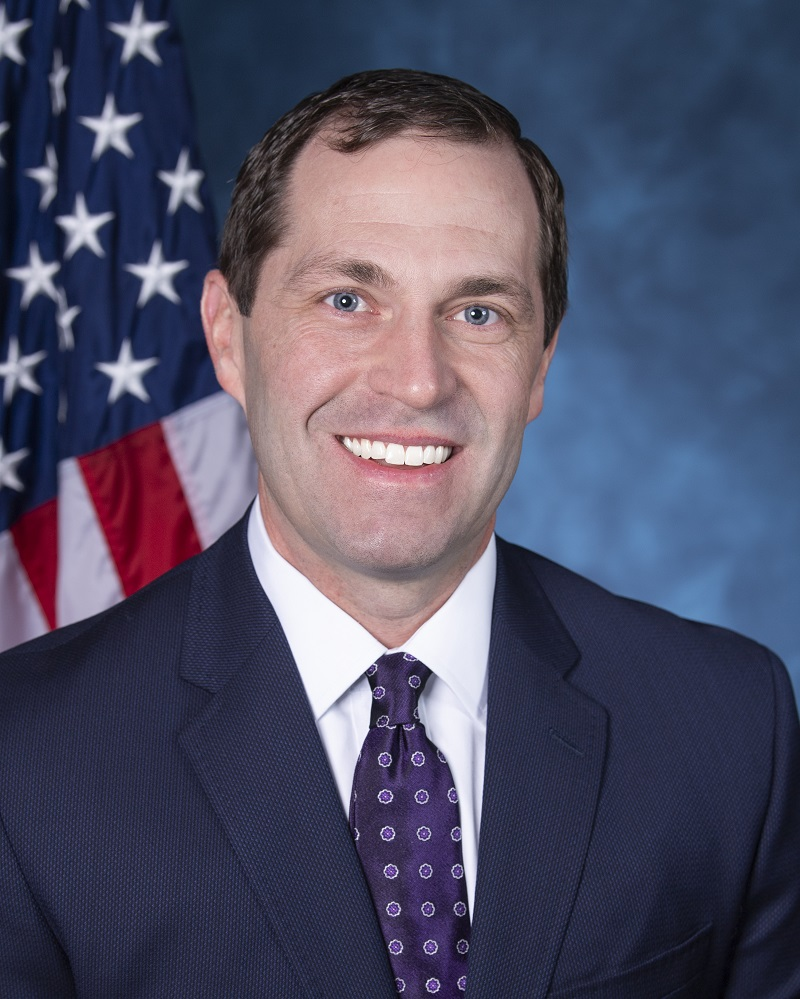
Jason Crow US representative from Colorado

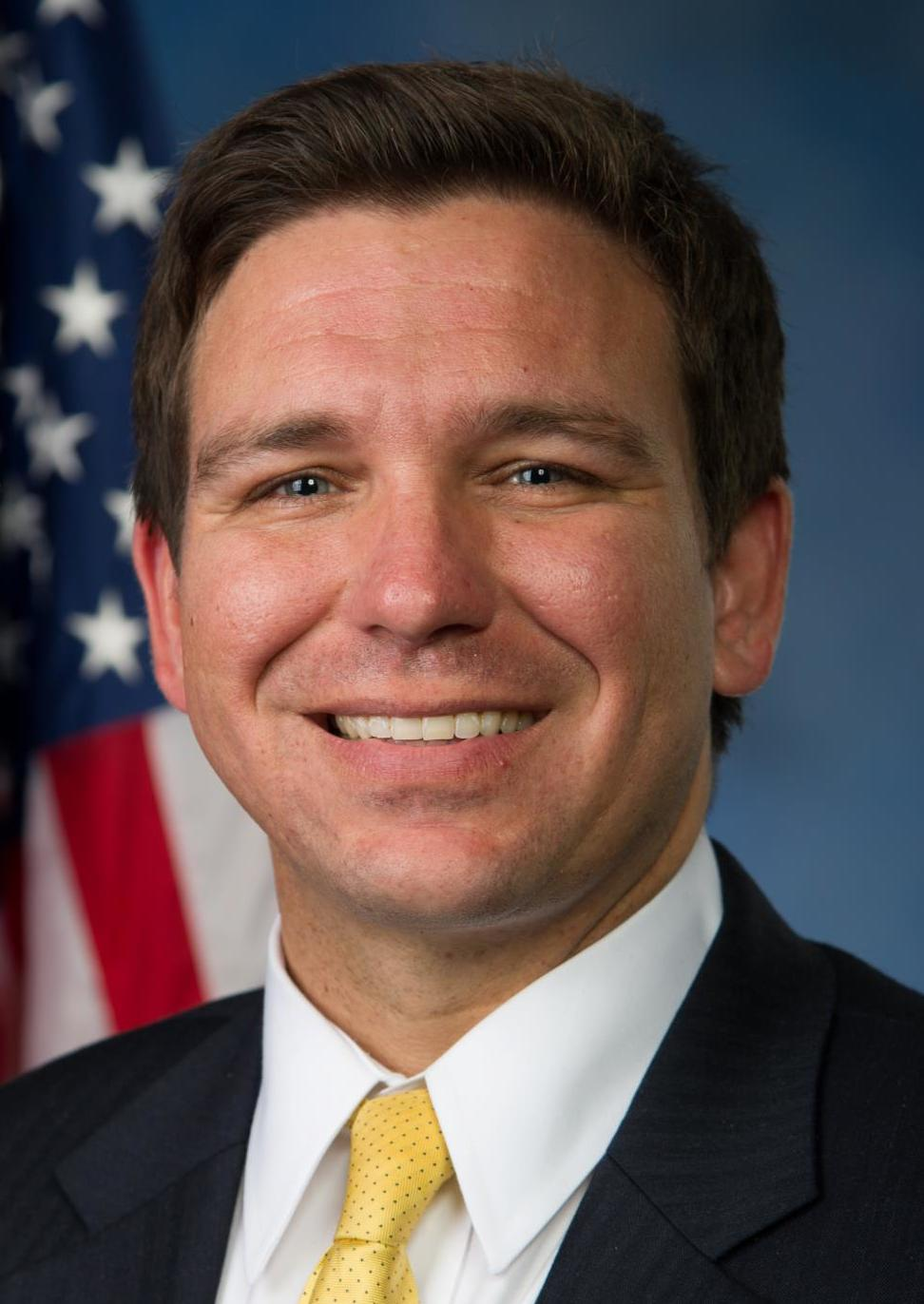
Ron DeSantis Governor of Florida

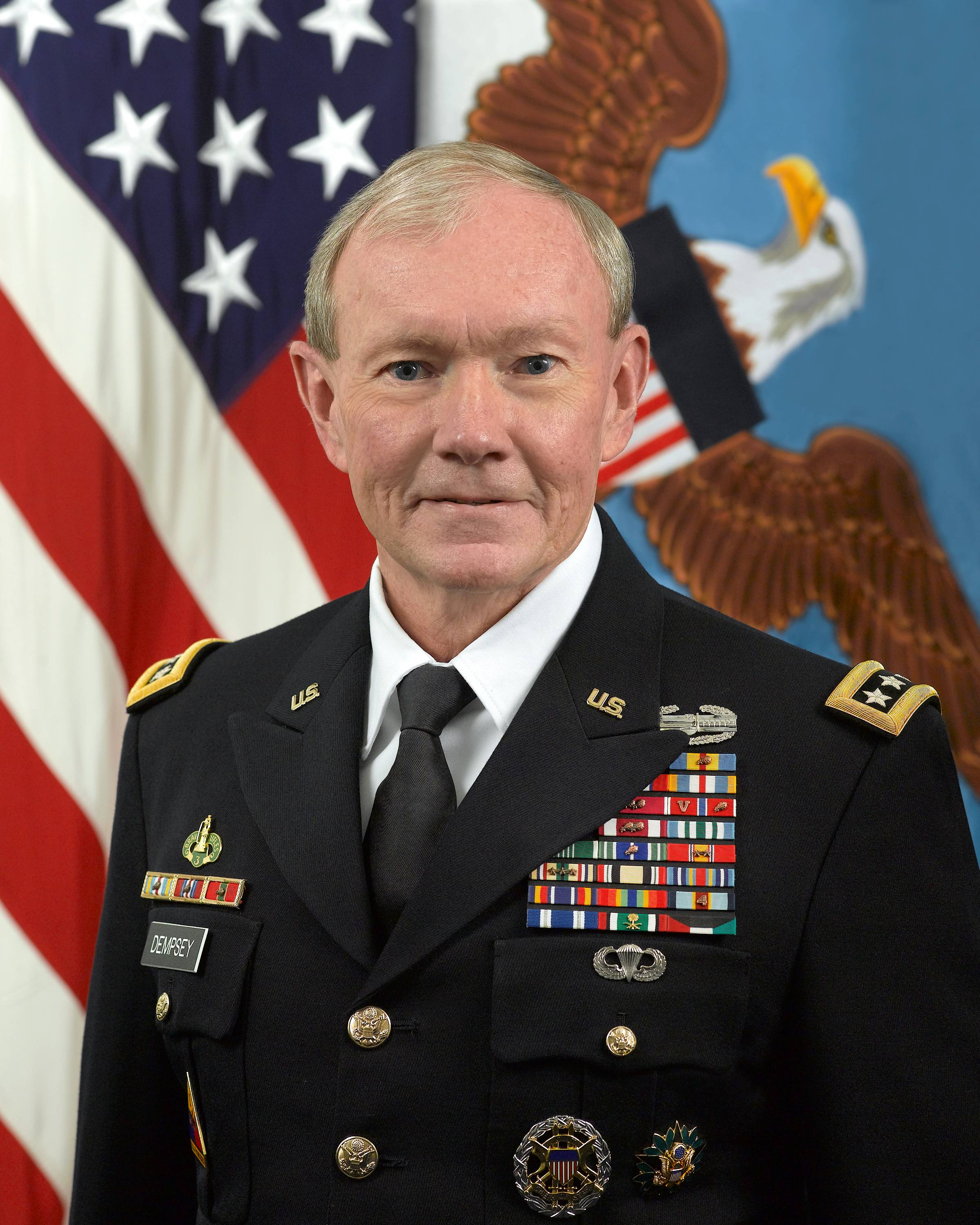
General Martin Dempsey, 18th Chairman of the Joint Chiefs of Staff

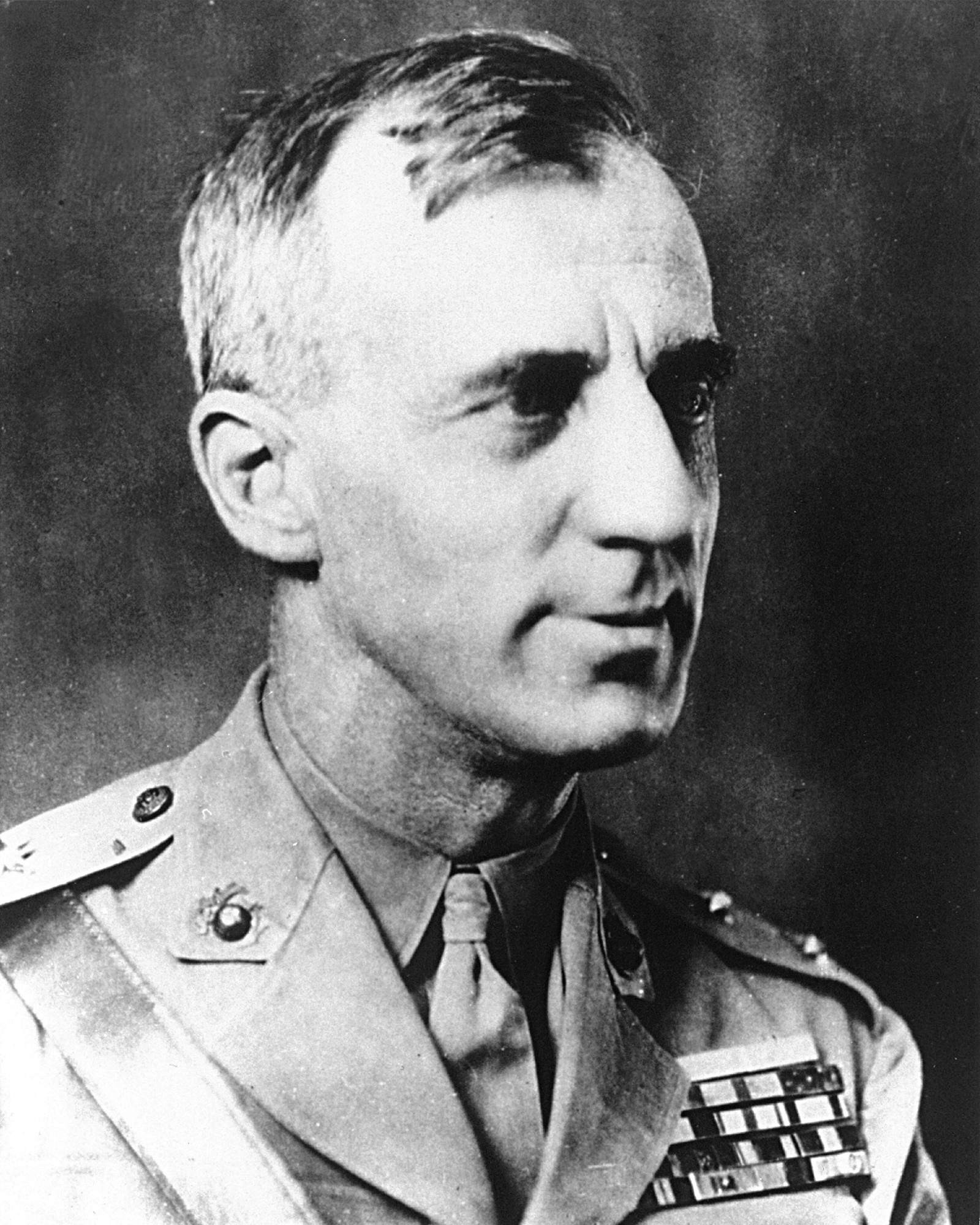
Major General Smedley Butler, two-time Medal-of-Honor recipient

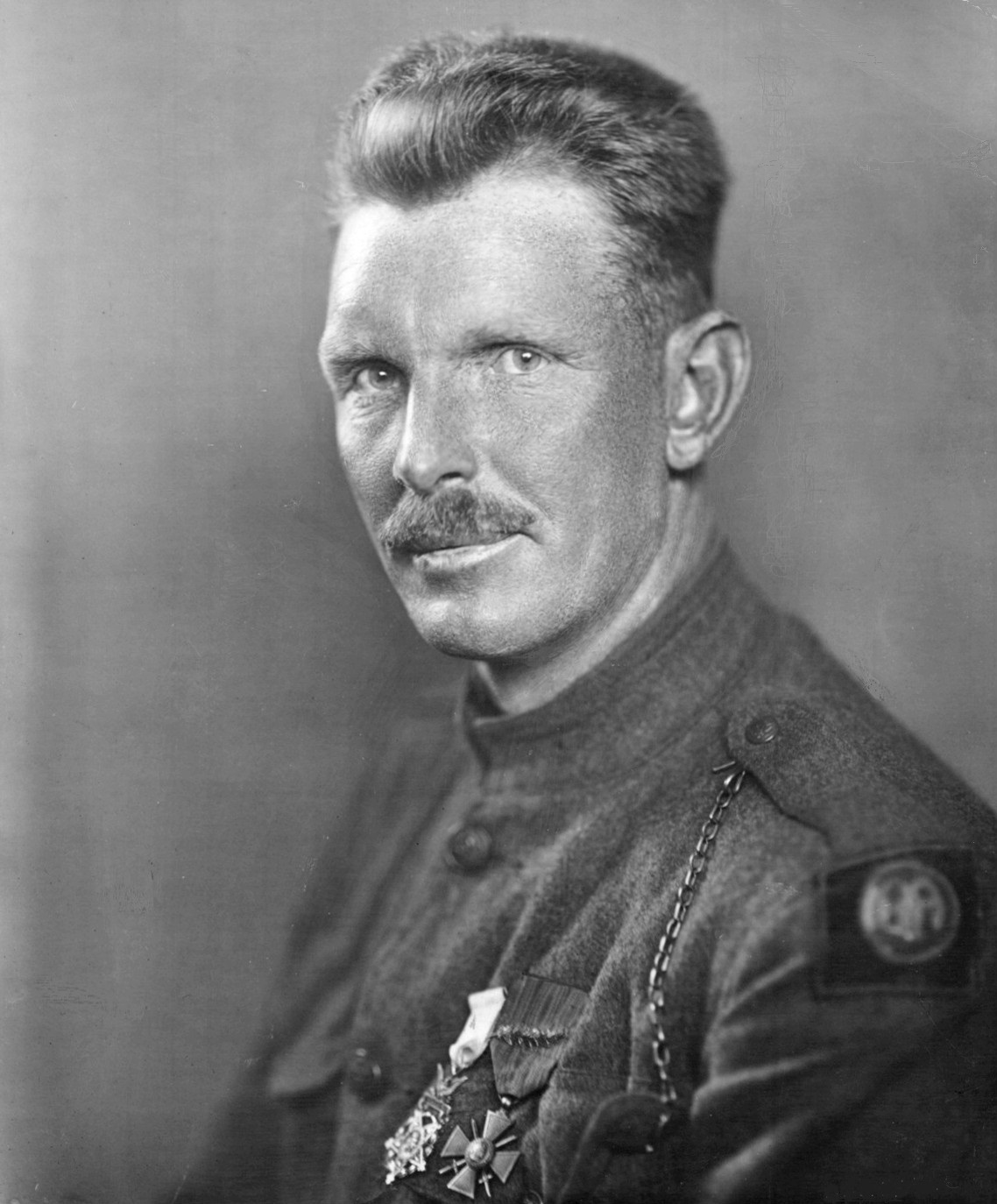
Sergeant Alvin York, Medal-of-Honor recipient

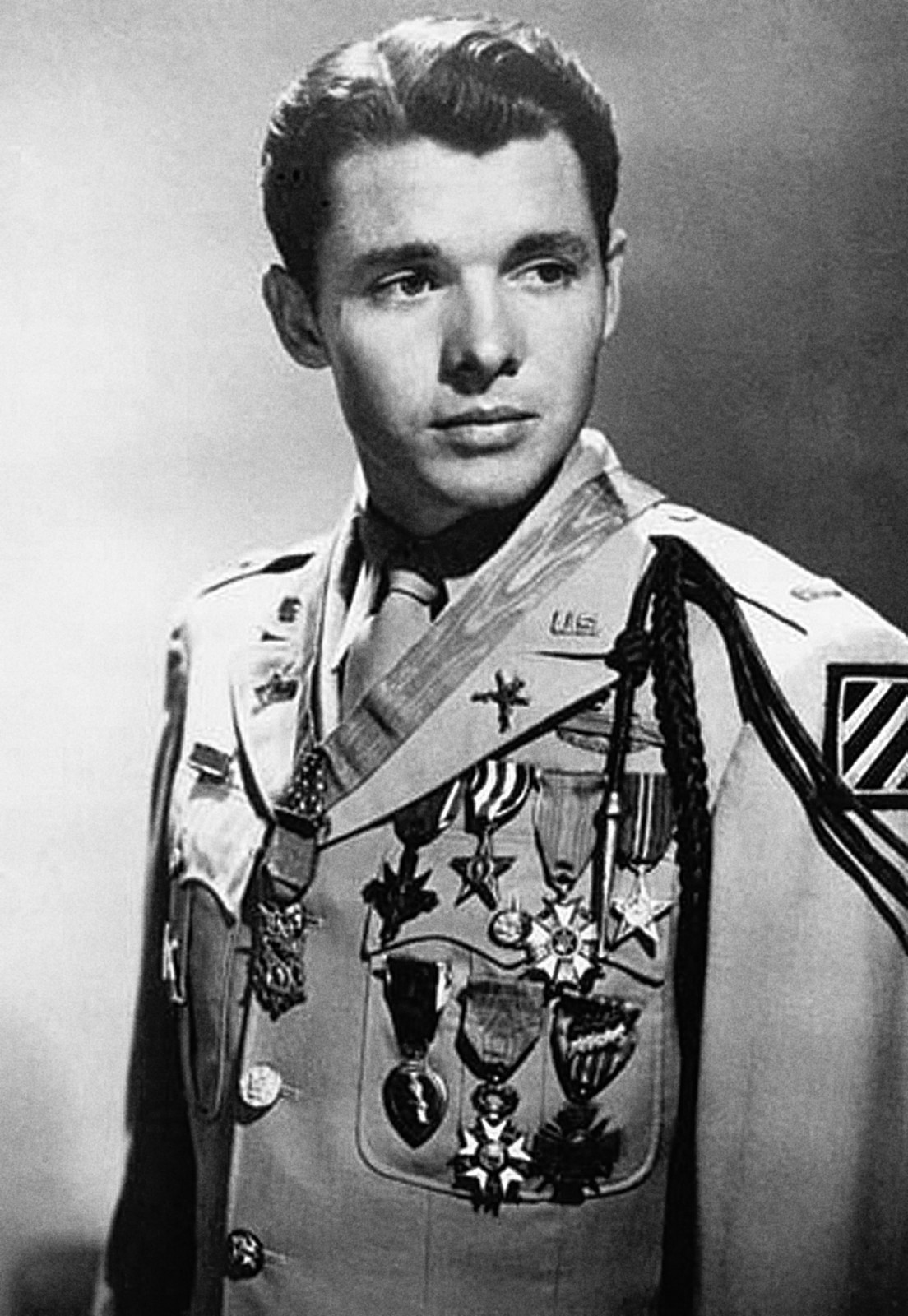
First Lieutenant Audie Murphy, Medal-of-Honor recipient

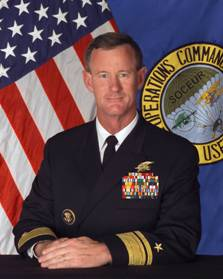
Admiral William H. McRaven Navy Seal, author

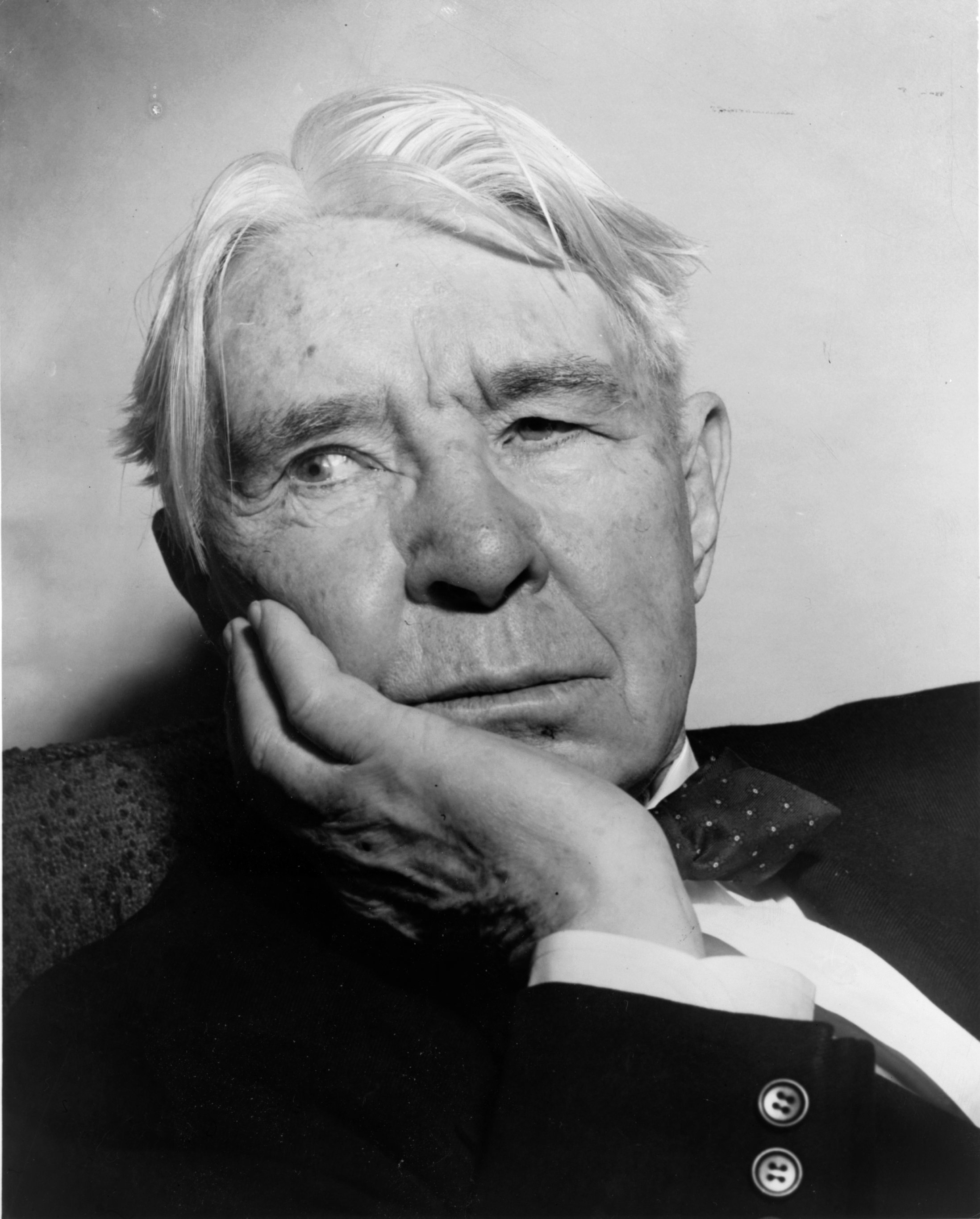
Carl Sandburg, three-time Pulitzer Prize winner

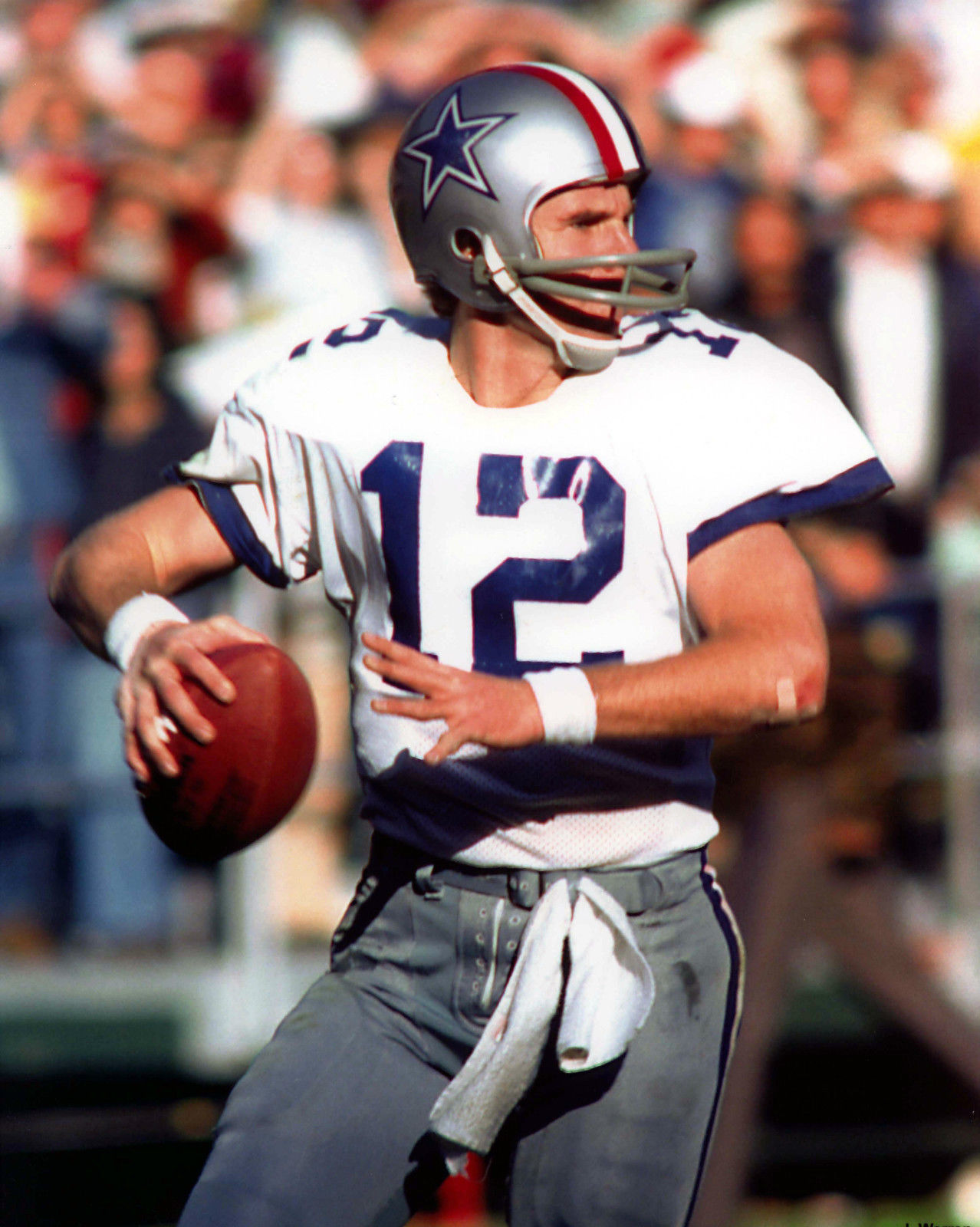
Roger Staubach, Pro Football Hall of Fame inductee

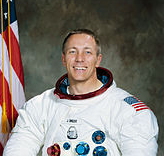
Jack Swigert American astronaut and politician

== See also ==
- List of veterans organizations
