= Military Order of the Cootie =

Organization of U.S. war veterans

- Emblem

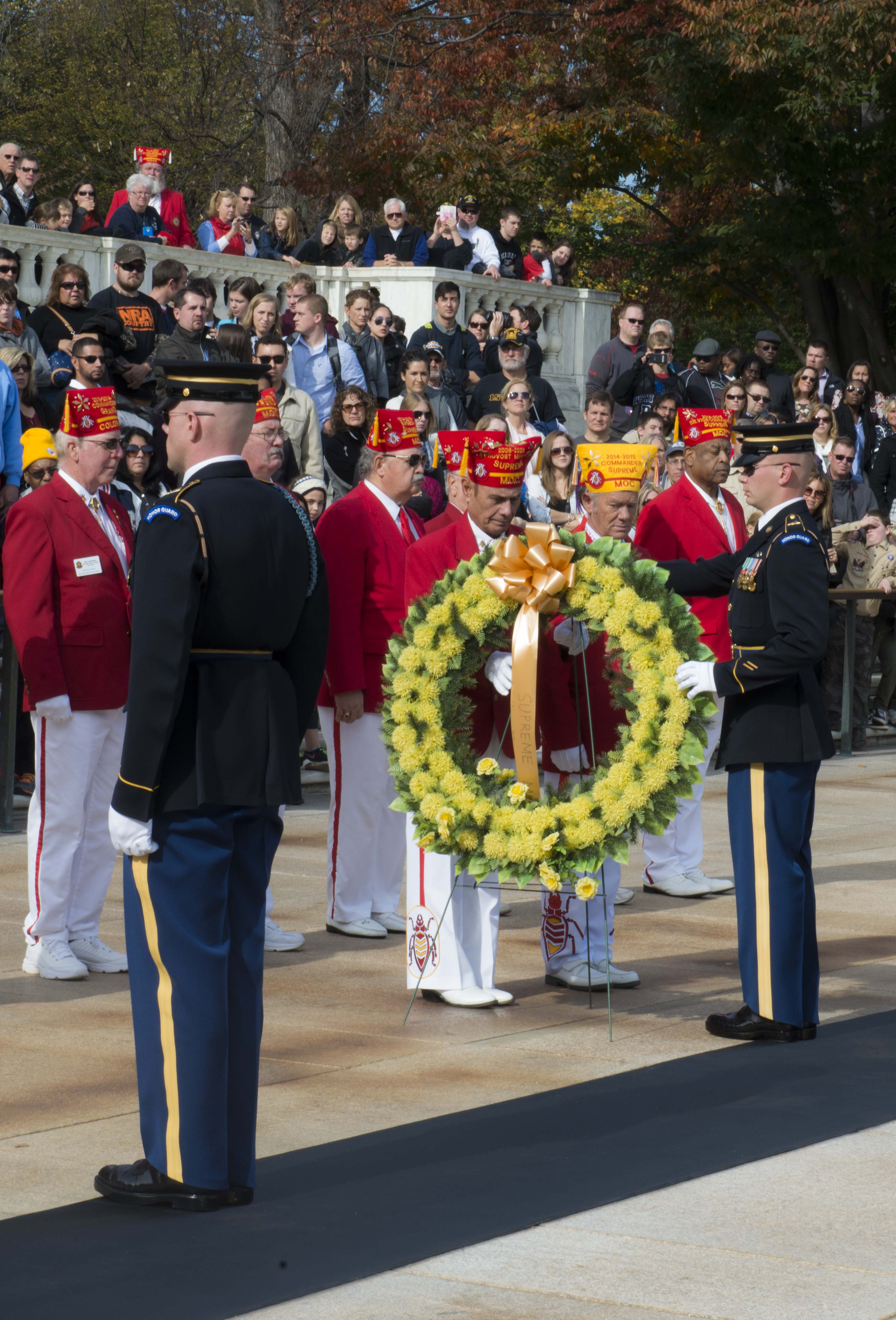
- Wreath Laying Ceremony at the Tomb of the Unknown Soldier
- Abbreviation: MOC
- Established: September 17, 1920 (105 years ago)
- Founders: Fred C. Madden; F. L. Gransbury
- Founded at: Washington, D.C.
- Headquarters: 604 Braddock Avenue, Turtle Creek, Pennsylvania
- Coordinates: 40.404917°N 79.829452°W
- Region served: Worldwide
- Supreme Seam Squirrel: Tracy Woodman
- Supreme Blanket Bum: Tracy Woodman
- Supreme Hide Gimlet: Ronnie Steele
- Parent organization: Veterans of Foreign Wars of the United States
- Website: lotcs.org

The Military Order of the Cootie of the United States (MOC, or simply Military Order of the Cootie) is a national honor degree membership association separately constituted as a subordinate and as an auxiliary order chartered by the Veterans of Foreign Wars of the United States (VFW). The organization's services include supporting the VFW National Home and veterans hospitals. Founded in 1920, it became a subsidiary of the VFW in 1923.

== History ==
The order (originally known as the Military Order of the Cootie, U.S.A.) was established on September 17, 1920, in Washington, D.C., by Fred C. Madden and F. L. Gransbury. The organization was modeled after the Imperial Order of the Dragon, an auxiliary to the United Spanish American War Veterans. The name "cootie" is a reference to the lice that plagued soldiers in World War I. Cooties were credited with keeping soldiers' heads down in the trenches. The Cooties are modeled after the Mason's Shriners as they are to the VFW as what a Shriner is to the Masons. A meeting of cooties is called a "scratch", the local chapter a "Pup Tent", the state affiliate a "Grand", and the national headquarters at Turtle Creek, Pennsylvania, "The Supreme."

== Notable members ==
Notable members of the Military Order of the Cootie have included:

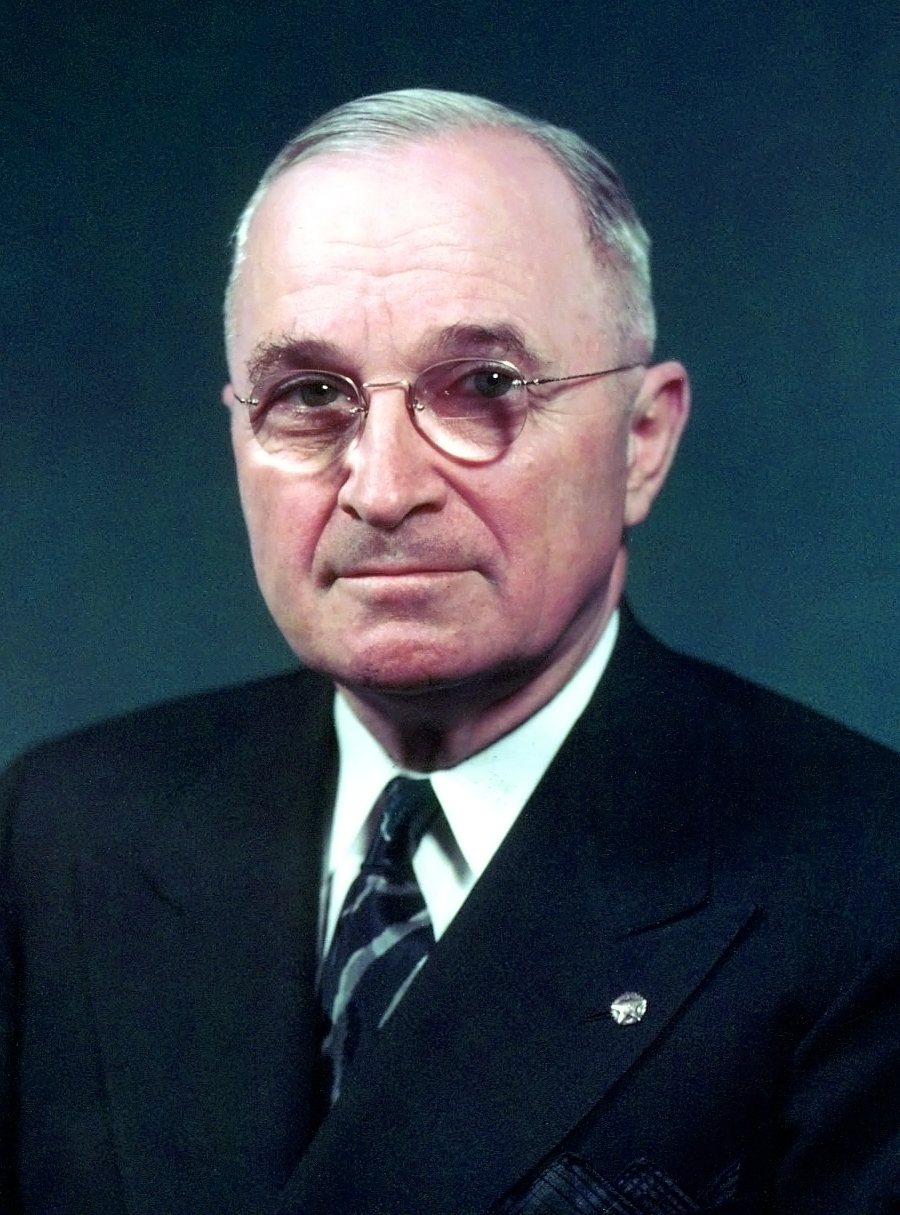
Harry Truman, 33rd President of the United States

George Bush, 41st President of the United States

== See also ==
- List of veterans organizations
