= Voice of Democracy (scholarship) =

Scholarship program

Logo used by the Veterans of Foreign Wars for the Voice of Democracy program.

Voice of Democracy (VOD) is an annual nationwide scholarship program sponsored by the Veterans of Foreign Wars (VFW). It is an audio-essay contest for high school students in grades 9-12. The program annually provides more than $2.3 million in scholarships. The first-place winner, who competes with all the first-place VFW Department (state) winners, receives a $35,000 scholarship that is paid directly to the recipient's American university, college or vocational/technical school.

Besides competing for the top scholarship prize, as well as other national scholarships ranging from $1,000 to $16,000, each Department's first-place winner receives an all-expense-paid trip to Washington, D.C. in March (annually).

The Voice of Democracy (VOD) Program began in 1946 and was originally sponsored by the National Association of Broadcasters. Initially, there were four winners selected, representing the North, South, East and West regions of the country. Each winner received a $500 savings bond and a wristwatch. The second year of the program, Charles Kuralt, the late television news broadcaster and author, was one of the winners.

It is endorsed by the contest criteria of the National Association of Secondary School Principals and is designed to foster patriotism by allowing students the opportunity to voice their opinion in a three- to five-minute essay based on an annual theme. Historically, the Voice of Democracy theme (chosen by the VFW Commander-in-Chief annually) is purposely kept broad in scope to allow the participant flexibility in interpretation, and thus, encourage originality. The new theme is posted on the website by May of each year.

The audiotape or audio CD (with the typed essay recited word-for-word), the actual typed essay, and completed official student entry form must be delivered to a local, participating VFW Post by the student entry deadline of October 31.

== Previous winners ==
As of 2024, the first place winner of the competition receives the $35,000 T.C. Selman Memorial Scholarship at the annual VFW Voice of Democracy Parade of Winners. Previous first place winners include:

- Sophia Lin (2024), a high school junior from Scottsdale, Arizona sponsored by Scottsdale VFW Post #3513.
- Scotland Stewart (2023), a high school sophomore from Winchester, Tennessee sponsored by Estill Springs VFW Post #1893.
- Daniela mare (2022), a high-school junior from Lake Ronkonkoma, New York.
- Erin Stoeckig (2021), a high-school junior from Rochester Minnesota sponsored by Whitlock-Sonnenberg Veterans of Foreign Wars (VFW) Post #1215.
- Shruthi Kumar (2020), a high-school senior from Marian High School in Omaha, Nebraska.
- Christine Troll (2019), a high-school senior from Somerset, Pennsylvania.
- Robyn Anzulis (2018), sponsored by VFW Post 10076 and its Auxiliary in Mt. Airy, Maryland.
- Savannah Wittman (2017), sponsored by VFW Post 12118 and its Auxiliary in Copperopolis, California.
- Grayson Campbell (2016), a high-school senior sponsored by VFW Post 10555 and its Auxiliary in Panama City Beach, Florida.
- Adam Densmore (2015), sponsored by VFW Post 3631 and Ladies Auxiliary in Aurora, Colorado.
- Shelia Cowart (1956), High School Sophomore from John Leonard High School
