= Academy of United States Veterans =

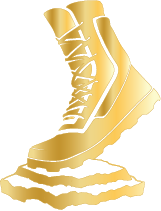
Vetty boot statuette graphic

The Academy of United States Veterans (AUSV) is a professional honorary organization with the stated goal of advancing the profile of organizations and programs that help serve the veterans community.

AUSV is known for its annual Veterans Awards also knowns as the Vettys.

The organisation came under close scrutiny by the veteran community after an article in Task & Purpose found that there was no real impact in the veteran community and employees "had no idea" what the organization really did. In July 2022 another Task & Purpose article reported that veteran couples who attended the AUSV organized "Camp Tranquility" retreat complained that they did not receive the meals and accommodations that were promised in the $600 donation vacation package. Additionally, the retreat organizers failed to provide proper accessibility for veterans with disabilities.

== Founding and objective ==
AUSV was founded by United States Army Afghanistan War combat veteran Assal Ravandi to create opportunities for community unity and empowerment. The organization is based in Arlington, VA. Its programs include non-partisan community and social advocacy through its various partnerships and collaboration with the arts and entertainment communities.

== Events ==
AUSV hosted its first Veterans Awards event in 2015 at George Washington University.

The second annual Veterans Awards hosted by AUSV was organised in conjunction with a non-partisan inaugural ball on January 20, 2017.

The third annual Veterans Awards hosted by AUSV was held at the Mayflower Hotel in Washington, D.C.

The fourth annual Veterans Awards hosted by AUSV was held at the Watergate Hotel in Washington, D.C.

The seventh annual Veterans Awards to be hosted by AUSV in Las Vegas, Nevada.
