= Navy Musicians Association =

- Emblem of the Navy Musicians Association
- Abbreviation: NMA
- Formation: 1995
- Type: Veterans' Organization
- Legal status: Tax-exempt 501(c)(19)
- Purpose: Fraternal, Service
- Members: Past and present U.S. Navy musicians
- President: Terry Chesson
- Website: navymusicians.org

The Navy Musicians Association (NMA) is a non-profit veterans organization of past and present United States Navy musicians. The NMA was founded in 1995 and has become a 501 (c) (19) tax exempt veteran's organization under the U.S. Tax Code.

== Mission ==
The purpose of the Navy Musicians Association is "to bring together, through annual reunions, past and present members of Navy bands; to promote camaraderie; to emphasize the importance of music in the Navy; and to maintain liaison with active bands in the Navy and Marine Corps, in order to preserve the tradition of Navy music."

== Membership Eligibility ==
All past and present members of official United States Navy bands are eligible for membership. There are no time-in-service or rank requirements.

== History ==
The NMA was founded in 1995 by a group of retired Navy musicians residing in the Hampton Roads area of Virginia who had served at the United States Armed Forces School of Music and in the United States Atlantic Fleet band. The organization has grown to accept former and present members of all official U.S. Navy bands.

== Reunions ==
The annual reunion of the Navy Musicians Association is held in June of each year. During the four-day affair, members form concert bands, big bands and jazz combos that rehearse daily and perform at concerts, dances and jam sessions. A reunion highlight, when location and scheduling permit, is a concert of patriotic music by an active-duty Navy band. Reunions are held in the NMA's "homeport" of Virginia Beach, Virginia and in various other cities. Recent locations have included:

- 2006 -- Louisville, Kentucky
- 2007 -- Virginia Beach, Virginia
- 2008 -- Memphis, Tennessee
- 2009 -- Virginia Beach, Virginia
- 2010 -- San Antonio, Texas
- 2011 -- Virginia Beach, Virginia
- 2012 -- Orlando, Florida
- 2013 -- Virginia Beach, Virginia
- 2014 -- Virginia Beach, Virginia
- 2015 -- Virginia Beach, Virginia
- 2016 -- Kansas City, Missouri
- 2017 -- Virginia Beach, Virginia
- 2018 -- Virginia Beach, Virginia
- 2019 -- Milwaukee, Wisconsin

== Leger Lines ==
The Navy Musicians Association's quarterly newsletter is Leger Lines, whose title is borrowed from that of the former newsletter of the U.S. Navy Music Program. Leger Lines is published quarterly and sent to all members.

== O.C. McMillan Scholarship Fund ==
The O.C. McMillan Scholarship Award is a cash award intended to give financial assistance to a young musician who is enrolled in or has been accepted for enrollment in a college-level degree program in music.
