= Veterans' organization =

Groups composed of veteran former service members

A veterans' organization, also known as an ex-service organization, is an organization composed of persons who served in a country's armed forces, especially those who served in the armed forces during a period of war. The organization's concerns include benefits for spouses and children, veterans' claims, post-traumatic stress disorder (PTSD) issues, and other topics related to veterans and to their families.

In the United States, there are more than 7,000 U.S.-based nonprofit organizations assisting veterans and their families. VSO’s can be located on page 3 of VA form 21-22a.

In the United Kingdom and its former colonies, an ex-service organisation is a voluntary association dedicated to the welfare of ex-service personnel (i.e. veterans). In addition to welfare services, they often participate in community projects and their 'local' or club is often a well-known meeting place or restaurant in a locality.

In France, the charter of the main governmental veterans' organization (ONACVG) has been expanded to include victims of terrorist attacks, following the 2015 attacks.

Notable veterans' organization are The American Legion, Disabled American Veterans (DAV), Veterans of Foreign Wars of the United States (VFW), Returned & Services League of Australia (RSL), and the Memorable Order of Tin Hats.

== See also ==
- List of veterans' organizations
