= National Socialist War Victim's Care =

Nazi welfare organisation for war veterans

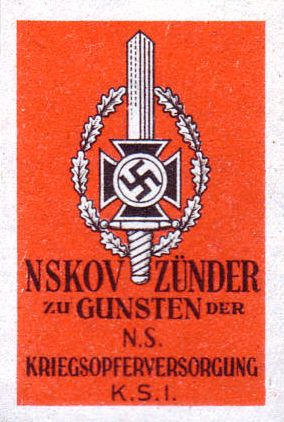
A matchbox label for the NSKOV

The National Socialist War Victim's Care (German: Nationalsozialistische Kriegsopferversorgung, NSKOV) was a social welfare organization for seriously wounded veterans as well as frontline fighters of World War I. The NSKOV was established in 1934 and was affiliated to the Nazi Party.

After Nazi Germany's defeat in World War II, the American military government issued a special law outlawing the Nazi Party and all of its branches. Known as Law number five, this denazification decree disbanded the NSKOV as with all organizations linked to the Nazi Party. The organizations taking care of the welfare for World War I veterans had to be established anew during the postwar reconstruction of both West and East Germany.

== History ==
The headquarters of the organization was in Kreuzberg, Berlin (at the time called the SW 68 district) and employed the architect Willy Muehlau to design cheap residential complexes for Nazi war veterans. These complexes emerged some time between the late 1920s and early 1930s and are protected according to the City of Berlin's Denkmalliste (monument list).

== See also ==
- Deutscher Kriegerbund
