= Team Red, White & Blue =

- Formation: 2010
- Founder: Mike Erwin
- Type: 501(c)(3) nonprofit organization
- Region served: United States
- Website: https://teamrwb.org/

Team Red, White & Blue (short Team RWB) is a U.S.-based veterans' nonprofit 501(c)(3) organization and was founded in 2010.

Its mission is to enrich the health and well-being of military veterans by fostering physical activity, social connection, and community engagement. Core elements include local training, fitness, and service events as well as a dedicated mobile app through which members can find and organize activities.

== History ==
Team Red, White & Blue was founded in 2010 by Mike Erwin, a U.S. Army officer and West Point psychology graduate, while he was still serving with the 1st Cavalry Division and later the 3rd Special Forces Group. His motivation stemmed from observing the challenges veterans faced in reconnecting with civilian life, as well as the potential of exercise and community engagement to bridge that gap.

Early on, Team RWB began as a volunteer movement centered around running events and small community gatherings. Erwin and a handful of supporters recognized that while numerous programs focused on treating wounded warriors, few emphasized sustained social reintegration and wellness for the broader veteran population. The organization's approach emphasized the three interconnected values of health, people, and purpose, which are later described in academic literature as the "Enrichment Equation."

By 2012, the organization had grown well beyond its origins in the Twin Cities Marathon, establishing local chapters in dozens of U.S. cities. According to a case study by the G.W. Bush Institute, by 2014 Team RWB counted more than 30 active chapters nationwide and had already started integrating civilian volunteers to foster veteran community interaction.

Through the mid-2010s, Team RWB adopted a more formal governance model with a national board, regional leadership, and paid staff. The introduction of the Team RWB mobile app in 2019 marked another milestone, enabling members to find local activities, organize events, and stay connected digitally. The app became a central platform for engagement.

As the organization matured, it also expanded its geographic and demographic reach. Chapters like Team RWB Omaha demonstrated how veterans, military families and civilians could work together to build healthy, inclusive communities through fitness and service.

By the early 2020s, Team RWB had evolved into one of the nation's largest veteran service organizations focused on well-being, boasting more than 232,000 registered members across all 50 states. In 2025, the leadership transition to Michael "Sully" Sullivan as Executive Director signaled the beginning of a new phase emphasizing sustained national growth and long-term community health initiatives.

The culmination of this growth was symbolized by national events such as the Old Glory Ultra Relay, a 3,000-mile nonstop relay across the United States involving hundreds of veterans and supporters carrying the American flag, reflecting the spirit and mission that began with a single marathon in 2010.

== Programs and activities ==
Team RWB organizes weekly and monthly running, cycling, fitness and social events across the country, in addition to aid projects and monthly themed missions. A characteristic format is flag relays and endurance competitions. In 2025, Team RWB organized the 3,000-mile Old Glory Ultra Relay across the United States.

Local chapters hold weekly activities both on and near military installations and in surrounding civilian communities. Participation and coordination are facilitated through a proprietary mobile app (iOS/Android), which allows members to discover local events, post their own activities, and join challenges. Based on download activity in the App Store, it can be seen that the mobile app has over 200,000 members.

Team RWB held the Stars and Stripes flag carry relay in 2021, starting on 11 September in New York and spanning over 2,500 miles across nine states to Atlanta to finish on Veterans Day.

In 2026, Team RWB organized the GWOT 100-mile challenge in which 60 airman participated from the 43rd Air Mobility Squadron.

== Research and impact ==
Team RWB is one of the few veterans' service organizations whose model has been described in peer-reviewed literature.

In 2024/25, Team RWB presented the results of a six-month health study that measured biomarkers, wearable data and the Enriched Life Scale. The results showed that a significant improvement in BMI and reduction in 'risk' biomarkers had occurred in a large proportion of participants.

The US Department of Veterans Affairs has highlighted Team RWB's role in reducing loneliness among veterans through community-based physical activities.

== Partnerships ==
Team RWB maintains long-standing corporate partnerships, notably with Starbucks (since 2015, programming & fundraising during Veterans Day and Military Appreciation Month).

In March 2014, Team RWB announced a partnership with Nike, whereby Nike would serve as the official sportswear supplier for Team RWB. As part of this collaboration, Nike announced that it would provide Dri-Fit sports shirts for Team RWB members.

A key element of the collaboration was that every new veteran who joins Team RWB will receive a Team RWB shirt produced by Nike.

The leadership of Team RWB expressed that their vision of mobilising veterans and engaging them in local communities aligns well with Nike's philosophy that 'everyone is an athlete'.

== Finances and governance ==
As a tax-exempt non-profit organization, Team Red White & Blue, Inc. is listed in public databases. In the 2021 financial year, they generated revenue of approximately £5.70 million and had net assets of £5.61 million. Revenues for the 2025 financial year were over $9.78 million and total assets were $14.9 million.

Charity Navigator, a non-profit and independent evaluation platform that rates charities (non-profits) on transparency, financial responsibility and effectiveness, awarded Team Red White & Blue, Inc. a 4-star rating.

== Public reception ==
Military media and local press have repeatedly covered Team RWB's activities at and around bases such as Fort Benning (now Fort Moore), often highlighting camaraderie, mentoring, and support for the military-to-civilian transition.

Public broadcasting outlets have featured Team RWB in veteran-focused stories, including PBS/TPT short features on veterans and civilian supporters participating together.
