= 1977 New Year Honours =

British royal recognitions

The New Year Honours 1977 are appointments in many of the Commonwealth realms to celebrate the year passed and mark the beginning of 1977. The awards were announced on 30 December 1976 in the United Kingdom, Australia, New Zealand, Barbados, Mauritius, Fiji, Grenada, and for Overseas Privy Councillors.

The recipients of honours are displayed as they were styled before their new honour and arranged by the country (in order of precedence) whose ministers advised the Queen on the appointments, then by honour with grades i.e. Knight/Dame Grand Cross, Knight/Dame Commander etc. and then divisions i.e. Civil, Diplomatic and Military as appropriate.

== United Kingdom ==
=== Life Peer ===
- Professor Sir John Fleetwood Baker, OBE, FRS. Formerly Professor of Mechanical Sciences and Head of the Department of Engineering, University of Cambridge.
- The Right Honourable Arthur Brian Deane Faulkner. Former Prime Minister of Northern Ireland and former Chief Executive Member of the Northern Ireland Executive.
- The Right Honourable Sir Morrice James, GCMG, CVO, MBE. Formerly British High Commissioner in Australia.
- The Right Honourable Edward Watson Short, CH. Chairman of Cable & Wireless Ltd. Lately Lord President of the Council. Formerly Member of Parliament for Newcastle upon Tyne Central, 1951–1976.
- The Right Honourable George Morgan Thomson. Member, Commission of the European Communities. Formerly Member of Parliament for Dundee East, 1952–1972.

=== Privy Counsellor ===
- Jesse Dickson Mabon, MP. Minister of State, Department of Energy. Member of Parliament for Greenock & Port Glasgow.
- Robert Edward Sheldon, MP. Financial Secretary, HM Treasury. Member of Parliament for Ashton-under-Lyne.
- David Martin Scott Steel, MP. Leader of the Liberal Party. Member of Parliament for Roxburgh, Selkirk & Peebles.
- Donald James Stewart, MP. Leader, Parliamentary Scottish National Party. Member of Parliament for the Western Isles.
- Alan John Williams, MP. Minister of State, Department of Industry. Member of Parliament for Swansea West.

Overseas List

- The Honourable John Michael Geoffrey Manningham Adams, MP, Prime Minister of Barbados.
- The Honourable Mr. Justice Cooke (Robin Brunskill Cooke), Judge of the Court of Appeal of New Zealand.
- The Honourable Eric Matthew Gairy, MP, Prime Minister of Grenada and Minister for External Affairs.
- His Excellency The Honourable Sir John Robert Kerr, AK, GCMG, QC, Governor-General of the Commonwealth of Australia.
- The Honourable Phillip Reginald Lynch, MP, Treasurer for the Commonwealth of Australia.
- The Honourable Ian McCahon Sinclair, MP, Minister for Primary Industry of the Commonwealth of Australia.
- The Honourable Michael Thomas Somare, MP, Prime Minister of Papua New Guinea.
- The Honourable Brian Edward Talboys, MP, Deputy Prime Minister and Minister of Foreign Affairs, Minister of Overseas Trade and Minister of National Development of New Zealand.

=== Knight Bachelor ===
- Donald Arthur Rolleston Albery. For services to the Theatre.
- Professor James Baddiley, FRS, Director, Microbiological Chemistry Research Laboratory, University of Newcastle upon Tyne.
- Kenneth Raymond Boyden Bond, Deputy Managing Director, General Electric Co. Ltd. For services to Export.
- Robert Camm Booth, CBE, TD, Chairman, The National Exhibition Centre Ltd. For services to Export.
- John Charnley, CBE, FRS, lately Professor of Orthopaedic Surgery, University of Manchester.
- John Warcup Cornforth, CBE, FRS, Royal Society Research Professor, University of Sussex.
- Clifford Michael Curzon, CBE, Pianist.
- Kenneth James Dover, FBA. For services to Greek scholarship.
- Professor David Gwynne Evans, CBE, FRS, lately Director, National Institute for Biological Standards and Control.
- Frank Hartley, CBE. For services to pharmacy.
- Christopher Thomas Higgins, Chairman, Peterborough Development Corporation.
- Harold Hobson, CBE, lately Drama Critic, The Sunday Times.
- Henry George Huckle, OBE, Chairman, Agricultural Training Board.
- Havelock Henry Trevor Hudson, Chairman of Lloyd's. For services to Export.
- Howard Leslie Kirkley, CBE. For services to overseas aid.
- Heinrich (Heinz) Koeppler, CBE, Warden of Wilton Park and Warden of the European Discussion Centre.
- Daniel McGarvey, CBE. For services to the Trade Union Movement.
- Leonard William Francis Millis, CBE. For services to the water industry.
- Alexander Warren Page, MBE, Chairman and Chief Executive, Metal Box Ltd.
- Herbert Charles Pereira, FRS, Chief Scientist, Ministry of Agriculture, Fisheries & Food.
- John Revans, CBE, lately Regional Medical Officer, Wessex Regional Health Authority.
- John Rix, MBE, Managing Director, Vosper Thornycroft & Co. Ltd. For services to Export.
- Denis Eric Rooke, CBE, Chairman, British Gas Corporation.
- Brigadier Noel Edward Vivian Short, MBE, MC, Secretary to the Speaker, House of Commons.
- James Eric Smith, CBE, FRS. For services to marine biology.
- William Tweddle, CBE, TD, Chairman, Yorkshire Regional Health Authority.
- Colonel George Anthony Wharton, CBE, TD, DL, Vice-Chairman, Council of Territorial Auxiliary and Volunteer Reserve Associations.
- James Brewis Woodeson, CBE, TD, Chairman, Clarke Chapman Ltd. and Chairman, Reyrolle Parsons Ltd. For services to Export.
- Edward Maitland Wright, lately Principal and Vice-Chancellor, University of Aberdeen.

Diplomatic Service and Overseas List

- Frederick Aubarua Osifelo, MBE, Chairman of the Public Service Commission, Solomon Islands.

Australian States

State of Victoria

- Gustav Joseph Victor Nossal, CBE, of Kew. For services to medicine and science.

State of Queensland

- John Allan Sewell, ISO, Auditor-General of Queensland.
- Evan Rees Whitaker Thomson, of Kenmore. For services to the medical profession and related fields of endeavour.

State of Western Australia

- Norman Seymour Fletcher, of Perth. For services to the agricultural and pastoral industries.

=== Order of the Bath ===
==== Knight Grand Cross of the Order of the Bath (GCB) ====
Military Division

- General Sir John Gibbon, KCB, OBE, ADC. Gen., (91397), Colonel Commandant Royal Regiment of Artillery.

==== Knight Commander of the Order of the Bath (KCB) ====
Military Division

Royal Navy

- Vice Admiral Henry Conyers Leach.
- Vice Admiral Allan Gordon Tait, DSC.

Army

- Lieutenant General Robert Cyril Ford, CB, CBE, (284433), late 4th/7th Royal Dragoon Guards.

Royal Air Force

- Air Marshal David George Evans, CBE.
- Air Marshal Rex David Roe, CB, AFC.

Civil Division

- Edward Clifford Cornford, CB, Chief Executive, Procurement Executive, Ministry of Defence.
- George Roy Denman, CB, CMG, Second Permanent Secretary, Cabinet Office.
- Basil Brodribb Hall, CB, MC, TD, HM Procurator General and Treasury Solicitor.
- John Edward Herbecq, Second Permanent Secretary, Civil Service Department.

==== Companion of the Order of the Bath (CB) ====
Military Division

Royal Navy

- Rear Admiral Kenneth Gordon Ager.
- Rear Admiral John Anthony Bell.
- Rear Admiral Frank Wright Hearn.
- Captain Michael Arnold Higgs.

Army

- Major General Robert Wallace Tudor Britten, MC, (204193), late Corps of Royal Engineers (now RARO).
- Major General Geoffrey Burch (265221), late Royal Regiment of Artillery.
- Major General Roy Laurence Dixon, MC, (308249), late Royal Tank Regiment.
- Major General Ronald William Lorne McAlister, OBE (336416), late 10th Princess Mary's Own Gurkha Rifles.
- Major General David John St. Maur Tabor, MC, (237402), late Royal Horse Guards.

Royal Air Force

- Air Vice-Marshal William Harbison, CBE, AFC.
- Air Vice-Marshal Donald Francis Graham MacLeod, QHDS.
- Air Vice-Marshal Aubrey Sidney-Wilmot, OBE.
- Acting Air Vice-Marshal Aleksander Maisner, CBE, AFC.

Civil Division

- Francis William Armstrong, MVO, Deputy Secretary, Ministry of Defence.
- Alexander Shelley Baker, OBE, DFC, Under Secretary, Home Office.
- Robert Edward Ball, MBE, Chief Master Supreme Court of Judicature (Chancery Division).
- Cyril Leonard Bourton, Deputy Secretary, Department of Health & Social Security.
- Philip Anthony Russell Brown, Deputy Secretary, Department of Trade.
- John Patrick Carswell, Secretary, University Grants Committee.
- James Brownlee Dick, Director, Building Research Establishment, Department of the Environment.
- Mereth Cecil Fessey, Under Secretary, Department of Industry.
- Harold Glover, Controller, HM Stationery Office.
- Roland James Lees, Director, Royal Signals and Radar Establishment, Ministry of Defence.
- Owen Humphrey Morris, CMG, Deputy Secretary, Welsh Office.
- Kenneth Alexander George Murray, Under Secretary, Civil Service Department.
- Marcel Ivan Prevett, Chief Valuer, Board of Inland Revenue.
- Richard Lyall Sharp, Under Secretary, HM Treasury.
- Ronald Alfred Dingwall-Smith, Under Secretary, Scottish Office.
- John Arthur Fownes Somerville, CBE, Foreign & Commonwealth Office.
- Joyce Toohey, Under Secretary, Department of the Environment.
- Dudley Russell Flower Turner, Secretary, Advisory, Conciliation & Arbitration Service.
- Douglas Williams, CVO, Deputy Secretary, Ministry of Overseas Development.

=== Order of Saint Michael and Saint George ===
==== Knight Grand Cross of the Order of St Michael and St George (GCMG) ====
- Sir Michael Palliser, KCMG, Permanent Under-Secretary of State, Foreign & Commonwealth Office and Head of HM Diplomatic Service.

==== Knight Commander of the Order of St Michael and St George (KCMG) ====
- Edward Noel Larmour, CMG, lately Deputy Under-Secretary of State, Foreign & Commonwealth Office.
- Ian McTaggart Sinclair, CMG, Legal Adviser, Foreign & Commonwealth Office.
- Richard Adam Sykes, CMG, MC, Deputy Under-Secretary of State, Foreign & Commonwealth Office.
- Edward Youde, CMG, MBE, HM Ambassador, Peking.

==== Companion of the Order of St Michael and St George (CMG) ====
- George Christopher Buchanan Dodds, lately Under Secretary, Ministry of Defence.
- Leonard George Goodwin, FRS. For services to the study of tropical diseases.
- Angus MacQueen, Chairman, The British Bank of the Middle East.
- William Kenneth Ward, Under Secretary, Department of Trade.

Diplomatic Service & Overseas List

- Guy Maurice Bratt, MBE, Counsellor, HM Embassy, Washington.
- Denis Campbell Bray, CVO, Secretary for Home Affairs, Hong Kong.
- Donald Paul Montague Stewart Cape, HM Ambassador, Vientiane.
- John Cecil Cloake, HM Ambassador, Sofia.
- Henry Galton Darwin, Deputy Legal Adviser, Foreign & Commonwealth Office.
- Geoffrey Francis Hancock, Counsellor, HM Embassy, Beirut.
- George William Harding, CVO, HM Ambassador-designate, Lima.
- John Henry Lewen, HM Ambassador, Maputo.
- Colin McLean, MBE, Counsellor, Foreign & Commonwealth Office.
- Richard Edmund Clement Fownes Parsons, HM Ambassador, Budapest.
- Michael Scott, MVO, HM Ambassador, Kathmandu.
- Kenneth James Uffen, lately Commercial Counsellor, HM Embassy, Moscow.
- Arthur Christopher Watson, Governor, Turks & Caicos Islands.

Australian States

State of New South Wales

- Reginald Frank William Watson. For services to commerce and the community.

State of Victoria

- The Honourable Murray Lewis Byrne, JP, of Ballarat. For services to government and the community.

State of Queensland

- Glen Sheil, of Auchenflower. For services to the engineering profession.

State of Western Australia

- The Right Reverend Ralph Gordon Hawkins, Bishop of Bunbury.

=== Royal Victorian Order ===
==== Knight Commander of the Royal Victorian Order (KCVO) ====
- Norman Bishop Hartnell, MVO.
- The Right Honourable George Charles Hayter, Baron Hayter, CBE.

==== Dame Commander of the Royal Victorian Order (DCVO) ====
- Ann Parker Bowles, CBE.

==== Commander of the Royal Victorian Order (CVO) ====
- Captain Alastair Sturgis Aird, MVO.
- Newlands Guy Bassett Smith.
- Bernard Christian Briant, MVO, MBE.
- Sidney Charles Hutchison, MVO.
- Lieutenant Colonel John Frederick Dame Johnston, MVO, MC.
- Frances Olivia Campbell-Preston.
- Group Captain James Donald Spottiswood, AFC, Royal Air Force.
- John Basil Stanier, MVO, TD.
- Peter Alfred Wright, MVO.

==== Member of the Royal Victorian Order, 4th class (MVO) ====
- Muriel Murray Brown.
- Stanley Finbow.
- Hugh Kelson Ford.
- Major Vyvyan Peter Wilfrid Harmsworth, Welsh Guards.
- Charles Arthur Owens.
- Christopher Trevor-Roberts.
- Leonard James Taylor.
- Louise Wigley.
- Harold George Yexley.

==== Member of the Royal Victorian Order, 5th class (MVO) ====
- Arthur Gawen.
- Major Richard Julian Gresty, The Royal Anglian Regiment.
- Josephine Marion Holgate.
- Ivan Leslie Harper Kidd.
- Evelyn May Lee, MBE.
- Captain James Robert Mason, Royal Marines.
- James Joseph Monaghan.
- Rosemary Ann Oliver.
- Harry Salter.
- Frederick John Turk.
- David Edwin Walker.

==== Medal of the Royal Victorian Order (RVM) ====
Gold

- Henry Charles Laing.

Silver

- George Henry Branscombe.
- Patrick Joseph Carroll.
- Petty Officer Joseph James Croft, J890118D.
- Yeoman Bed Hanger Lancelot Victor Dawson, Her Majesty's Bodyguard of the Yeomen of the Guard.
- Chief Petty Officer John Trevor Gregory, J901631W.
- Henry Edward Harrison.
- M0687890 Sergeant Barry Terence Hollings, Royal Air Force.
- Donald Frederick Humphries.
- Anthony John Jarred.
- Glanwyn Jenkins.
- Police Constable Fred Lane, Metropolitan Police.
- Leading Steward Ronald James Patterson, L960050E.
- Arthur Thomas Pinder.
- Clifford Bassett Skeet.
- Harold Owen Whitfield.

=== Order of the British Empire ===
==== Knight Grand Cross of the Order of the British Empire (GBE) ====
Military Division

- Admiral Sir Peter White, KBE.

Civil Division

- Sir Robert Mark, QPM, Commissioner of Police of the Metropolis.

==== Knight Commander of the Order of the British Empire (KBE) ====
Military Division

- Vice Admiral James George Jungius.

Civil Division
Diplomatic Service and Overseas List

- James Richard Holt, CBE. For services to British commercial interests and the British community in Thailand.
- Peter George Arthur Wakefield, CMG, HM Ambassador, Beirut.

Australian States

State of Victoria

- Alick Benson McKay, CBE, of London, England. For services to the Government of Victoria and newspaper publishing.

State of Western Australia

- The Most Rev. Launcelot John Goody, Roman Catholic Archbishop of Perth since 1968.

==== Dame Commander of the Order of the British Empire (DBE) ====
Civil Division

- Geraldine Maitland Aves, CBE. For services to the Volunteer Centre.
- Marchesa Iris Origo. For services to British cultural interests in Italy and to Anglo-Italian relations.

==== Commander of the Order of the British Empire (CBE) ====
Military Division

Royal Navy

- Captain John Murray Craig Dunlop.
- Captain Laurence Hugh Oliphant, DSC.
- Commodore Alan Leslie Coverdale Wilkinson, RD, Royal Naval Reserve.
- Captain John Davenport Winstanley.

Army

- Colonel (Acting Brigadier) Norman Alan Butler (407780), late Royal Corps of Signals.
- Colonel Sydney Harry Chapman, OBE (349718), late The Royal Regiment of Fusiliers.
- Colonel Donald Alexander Bowe Crawford, ERD, (407565), late Royal Corps of Signals, Territorial and Army Volunteer Reserve.
- Brigadier Bolton Neil Littledale Fletcher, ADC, (262174), late The Light Infantry.
- Colonel Peter Echlin Gerahty, MBE, (207799), late The Royal Green Jackets (now RARO).
- Brigadier Dennis Bossey Rendell, MBE, MC, ADC, (180657), Corps of Royal Military Police.

Royal Air Force

- Air Commodore Elspeth Mavor McKechnie, (Retd.).
- Air Commodore Leslie George Patrick Martin, (Retd.).
- Group Captain Denis John Mountford, AFC.
- Group Captain Graham Brian Henry Norris.
- Group Captain Robert Clive Simpson, OBE.
- Group Captain Leslie Swart, AFC.

Civil Division

- Norman Stanley Bailey, Singer.
- Daniel Sennett Barnes, Managing Director, Sperry Gyroscope.
- Dennis Arthur Birch, lately Chairman, West Midlands County Council.
- James Fabian Blunt, Collector, London Airports, Board of Customs and Excise.
- Gavin Boyd, Chairman, Scottish Opera Theatre Royal Ltd.
- Leonard Butler Boyle, Director and General Manager, Principality Building Society.
- Frank Raymond Bradbury, Professor of Industrial Science, University of Stirling.
- Edward Gordon Wallker Browne, lately Senior Technical Adviser, Ministry of Defence.
- Ernest Arthur Bullock, Assistant Chief Valuer, Board of Inland Revenue.
- Anthony Lewis Burton, Chairman, Furniture & Timber Industry Training Board.
- Terence Anthony Casey, General Secretary, National Association of Schoolmasters.
- Joan Elizabeth Christmas, Chairman, Social Services Committee, Hampshire County Council.
- Leslie Joseph Clark, BEM, lately President, International Gas Union.
- Margaret Veronica Crabbie, Chairman, Scotland, Women's Royal Voluntary Service.
- John William Charles Darbourne, Architect.
- George Leon Severyn Dobry, QC. For services to development control.
- Denis George Dodds, Chairman, Merseyside & North Wales Electricity Board.
- David Macfarlane Doig, Senior Partner, D. M. Doig & Smith, Chartered Quantity Surveyors, Glasgow.
- William Lingwood Douglass, Secretary, Lothian Health Board.
- Gordon Kenneth Duddridge, lately Director of Submarine Systems Division, Standard Telephones and Cables Ltd. For services to Export.
- Benjamin Dufton, Treasurer, Hampshire County Council.
- Group Captain Hugh Spencer Lisle Dundas, DSO, DFC, Managing Director, British Electric Traction Company Ltd.
- Peter Thomas Dunican, Senior Partner, Ove Arup Partnership.
- John Clifford Holgate Ellis, Solicitor, Senior Partner, Mewburn Ellis & Co., Patent Agents.
- Frederick Alfred John Beatty Everard, Chairman, F. T. Everard & Sons Ltd.
- Herbert Leonard Farrimond, lately Member, British Railways Board.
- Trevor Charles Noel Gibbens, MBE, Professor of Forensic Psychiatry, University of London.
- Alfred Goldstein, Senior Partner, R. Travers Morgan & Partners.
- William Richard Gowers, Chairman, Oxfordshire Area Health Authority.
- Professor Archibald David Mant Greenfield, Dean of the Faculty of Medicine, University of Nottingham.
- David Rex Willman Greenslade. For services to the Press Council.
- Mary Alison Glen Haig, MBE, Chairman, Central Council of Physical Recreation.
- John Stanley Halbert, Deputy Chairman and Managing Director, Associated British Machine Tool Makers Ltd. For services to Export.
- Arthur Hambleton, OBE, MC, QPM, Chief Constable, Dorset Police.
- Cyril Walter Hand, Assistant Secretary, Department for National Savings.
- Lloyd Adnitt Harrison, Chief Executive Officer, Greater Nottingham Co-operative Society.
- Stanley Herbert Hawkins. For services to the Lawn Tennis Association.
- James Robertson Hendin, Assistant Managing Director, Vickers Ltd. For services to Export.
- Patrick Heron, Painter.
- Bryan Hildrew, Technical Director, Lloyd's Register of Shipping.
- John Maurice Houlder, MBE, Chairman, Houlder Offshore Ltd.
- Thomas Andrew Hume, Director, Museum of London.
- Professor Hugh Sydney Hunt. For services to Drama.
- Peter Donald Inman, TD, DL, Chief Executive/Clerk, Lancashire County Council.
- John Fabian Brindley Jackson, Managing Director, APV Paramount Ltd.
- Major Lionel Frederic Edward James, MBE, Comptroller, The Forces Help Society & Lord Roberts Workshops.
- Professor Walter James, lately Chairman, National Council for Voluntary Youth Services.
- John Iorwerth Jones, Lord Mayor of the City of Cardiff.
- His Honour Judge John Mervyn Guthrie Griffith-Jones, MC, The Common Serjeant, City of London.
- Hugh Mortimer Joseph, Commercial Director, Lyons Bakery Ltd. For services to the food industry.
- Patrick Bernard Kavanagh, QPM, Assistant Commissioner, Metropolitan Police.
- Arnold Wilfred Geoffrey Kean, Secretary and Legal Adviser, Civil Aviation Authority.
- Robert Joseph Knight, Director of Engineering, Jaguar, British Leyland UK Ltd.
- Charles Legh Shuldham Cornwall-Legh, OBE, DL. For public services in Cheshire.
- Dermot Lehane, Medical Director, Regional Transfusion Centre, Liverpool.
- Ralph Alexander Leigh, F.B.A, Professor of French, University of Cambridge.
- Anthony James William Simpson Leonard, MC, Group Treasurer, Royal Dutch Shell Group of Companies.
- Professor Ian Albert McKenzie Lucas, Member, Advisory Council for Agriculture & Horticulture in England & Wales.
- Arthur George Joseph Luffman, OBE, Chief Inspector of Schools, Department of Education & Science.
- Mary Katherine Macdonald, Assistant Secretary, Scottish Home & Health Department.
- Elizabeth Maconchy (Elizabeth Violet Le Fanu), Composer.
- Gerard Evelyn Herbert Mansell, Managing Director, External Broadcasting, British Broadcasting Corporation.
- Norman Stayner Marsh, QC, Law Commissioner.
- Thomas Nelson Marsh, AM, OBE, Acting Managing Director and Director Technical Operations, Reactor Group, United Kingdom Atomic Energy Authority.
- John Sinclair Martin. For services to the Agricultural Research Council.
- James Charles Maybank, Chairman, Maybank Enterprises Ltd.
- Peter Moro, Architect.
- Arthur Reginald Douglas Murray, Assistant Secretary, Department of Energy.
- William Francis Lister Newcombe, OBE, TD, General Secretary, The Army Cadet Force Association.
- The Reverend Murdo John Nicolson, Convenor, Highland Regional Council.
- Peter Saxton Fitzjames Noble, Director, Christopher & Co. Ltd. For services to the wine trade.
- Mark Richard Norman, OBE For services to the National Trust.
- Samuel Griffith Owen, Second Secretary, Medical Research Council.
- John Gabriel Parkes, Chairman, Merseyside Committee, Unilever Ltd.
- Richard Edward Pasco, Actor.
- Joseph Patrick, Vice-President, Europe, Cummins Engine Co. Ltd. For services to Export.
- Henry John Peake, lately Principal, Sheffield City College of Education.
- William Harvey Pearce, OBE, Chief Probation Officer, Inner London Probation and After-Care Service.
- Frank Pethybridge, Regional Administrator, North Western Regional Health Authority.
- John Francis Phillips, OBE For services to Business Education.
- Thomas John Rainsford, MBE, Chairman, Northern Ireland Supplementary Benefits Commission.
- Robert John Ramsey, Director, Industrial Relations, Ford Motor Co. Ltd.
- Simon Holcombe Jervis Read, MC, Foreign & Commonwealth Office.
- Ernest Richards, Farmer, West Glamorgan.
- Julian Errington Ridsdale, MP. For services to the furtherance of Anglo-Japanese friendship.
- Robert William Roseveare, Managing Director, Policy Co-ordination, and Secretary, British Steel Corporation.
- Walter Roy, Headmaster, The Hewett School, Norwich.
- Gilbert John Shoebridge, lately Assistant Secretary, Department of the Environment.
- Charles Edward Shopland, Leader, Middlesbrough Borough Council.
- Ernest Smith. For services to the building industry.
- Leonard Herbert Smith, MBE. For public and charitable services.
- David Ebenezer Stimpson, Principal, Dundee College of Education.
- David Hamilton Pryce Thomas, President, Rent Assessment Panel for Wales.
- Robert Harold Thorpe, Deputy Chairman and Managing Director, Anderson Strathclyde Ltd. For services to Export.
- Norman Henry Turner, Official Solicitor to the Supreme Court.
- Ronald Ernest Utiger, Managing Director, British Aluminium Co. Ltd.
- Professor Thomas Cyril White, lately Professor of Orthodontics, University of Glasgow.
- Thomas Douglas Whittet, Chief Pharmacist, Department of Health & Social Security.
- Sidney Wild. For services to the British Bankers' Association.
- Professor Denley William Wright, Director, National Vegetable Research Station.
- David Joseph Wyatt, formerly Assistant Secretary, Northern Ireland Office.

Diplomatic Service and Overseas List

- George William Baker, OBE, VRD, British High Commissioner, Port Moresby.
- John Ellis Barrell, lately Director of Valuation, Customs Co-operation Council, Brussels.
- Peter Cunliff Coates. For services to British commercial interests in Australia.
- Roy Evans Downing, Director of Civil Aviation, Hong Kong.
- Charles Frederick Farncombe. For services to music and Anglo-Swedish relations.
- Joan Mary Findlay, OBE. For services to the British community in Argentina.
- Arnold Adolphus Francis. For public services in Bermuda.
- John Francis Hart, OBE. For services to veterinary development in Ethiopia.
- Gwilym Wyn Jones, lately Secretary to the Chief Minister, Solomon Islands.
- John Colville Kelly, OBE. For services to British commercial interests and the British community in Lebanon.
- Quo-wei Lee, OBE. For public services in Hong Kong.
- Frank Duckworth Lester. For services to British commercial interests in South Africa.
- Clive Little, CPM. For services to British commercial interests in Malaysia.
- Oliver Giles Longley, MC. For services to British commercial interests and the British community in Paris.
- Anthony Bernard McNulty, MBE, lately Secretary to the European Commission of Human Rights, Strasbourg.
- Clifford Francis Pennison, lately Consultant to the United Nations Food and Agriculture Organization, Rome.
- Naboua Ratieta. For public services in the Gilbert Islands.
- Max Rostal. For services to music and Anglo-Swiss relations.
- Wai-yau Shum, OBE. For public and community services in Hong Kong.
- Reginald Derek Wise, Legal Adviser, HM Embassy, Paris and for services to the British community.
- Arthur Michael Wood. For services to medical research in East Africa.

Australian States

State of New South Wales

- Jean Sinclair Isbister, OBE. For services to medicine.
- Franco Belgiorno-Nettis. For services to the arts.
- Professor Irvine Armstrong Watson, Professor of Agricultural Botany (Plant Breeding), Sydney University.

State of Victoria

- Alan Stoller, of Mount Eliza. For services to medicine.
- Councillor Ronald Joseph Walker, JP, of Toorak. For services to the City of Melbourne and local government.

State of Queensland

- Stewart Clarence Hale Foote, of Chelmer. For services to the legal profession.
- Alexander Christy Freeleagus, of Highgate Hill. For services to the Greek community.

State of Western Australia

- Clarence Charles Adams, of Mosman Park. For services in the field of industrial relations.

==== Officer of the Order of the British Empire (OBE) ====
Military Division

Royal Navy

- Commander Peter Joscelyn Everett.
- Captain Thomas Dudson Fox, VRD, Royal Naval Reserve.
- Major Jesse Hotchkiss Haycock, Royal Marines.
- Lieutenant Colonel Leslie Eric Hudson, Royal Marines.
- Commander Edward James Leatherby.
- Commander Henry Leslie Victor Leeves.
- Commander Ian Mcdonald.
- Commander William Hamish Hendry McLeod.
- Commander Bernard Charles Mallett Mote, VRD*, Royal Naval Reserve.
- Commander John Gerard Nelson.
- Commander Richard Grenville Sharpe.
- Commander Jeffrey Francis Webb.

Army

- Lieutenant Colonel Russell Brunker Anderson (397170), The Royal Scots Dragoon Guards (Carabiniers and Greys).
- Colonel (Acting) Kenneth Moubray Burnett, TD, (75693), Army Cadet Force, Territorial and Army Volunteer Reserve.
- Lieutenant Colonel Ian Alexander Christie, MBE, MC, (443414), The King's Own Scottish Borderers.
- Lieutenant Colonel Thomas Angus Coghill (424539), 7th Duke of Edinburgh's Own Gurkha Rifles.
- Lieutenant Colonel Ian Douglas Corden-Lloyd, MC, (457134), The Royal Green Jackets.
- Lieutenant Colonel Michael Nicholas Vine Duddridge (414842), Royal Corps of Transport.
- Lieutenant Colonel David Valentine Fanshawe (433105), Grenadier Guards.
- Lieutenant Colonel (Quartermaster) John Edward Humphreys (472036), Corps of Royal Engineers.
- Lieutenant Colonel John Francis Henry Peter Johnson (376530), The Light Infantry.
- Lieutenant Colonel James Anderson Allan Martin (439558), Corps of Royal Electrical and Mechanical Engineers.
- Lieutenant Colonel Richard Quintin Mull Morris (418339), 16th/5th The Queen's Royal Lancers.
- Lieutenant Colonel Derek Priaulx Robinson (419838), Royal Corps of Signals, Territorial and Army Volunteer Reserve.
- Lieutenant Colonel William James Stockton (420931), 14th/20th King's Hussars.
- Lieutenant Colonel Harry Reginald Anthony Streather, MBE, (384233), The Gloucestershire Regiment.
- Lieutenant Colonel Charles John Waters (445998), The Gloucestershire Regiment.
- Lieutenant Colonel Arthur James Lewin Webb (132133), Royal Corps of Transport (now Retd.).

Royal Air Force

- Acting Group Captain Peter Graham Botterill, AFC.
- Wing Commander John Andrew Bell, MBE, (607561).
- Wing Commander George Cairns, MBE, (178032).
- Wing Commander John Donald Drysdale (2542734).
- Wing Commander Haydn Edward Jacobs, MBE, (178225).
- Wing Commander Eric Matthews (4078011).
- Wing Commander Noel Robert Moss (180589).
- Wing Commander Richard Arthur Pendry, AFC, (2237951), (Retd.).
- Wing Commander Fraser Phillips (202193).
- Wing Commander Colin Donald Preece, AFC, (1898620).
- Wing Commander Gareth Huw Rees (503585).
- Wing Commander Robert William Smith (5064046).
- Wing Commander Gordon Thomas Tripp (4082007).
- Wing Commander Clive Williams (3504737).

Civil Division

- John Crawford Adams, Consultant in Orthopaedic Surgery to the Royal Air Force.
- Wilfred Norman Aldridge, Deputy Director, Toxicology Unit, Medical Research Council.
- William Joseph Ambrose, lately Director of Advertising and Trade Relations, Beecham Products.
- David William Anderton. For services to Chess.
- Patrick Niall Armstrong, Clerk, Parliamentary Group for World Government.
- Tom Armstrong, Director, Wolsingham Steel Co. Ltd.
- Lorna Margaret Arnold, Principal, United Kingdom Atomic Energy Authority.
- Dennis Lovell Randolph Auton, Chairman, Young & Rubican Ltd.
- Arthur Baker, TD, Member and Vice-Chairman, Dumfries and Galloway Area Health Board.
- Nelson Mills Baldwin, Chairman, Speedway Control Board Ltd.
- David Gordon Bannerman, Technical Adviser, Ministry of Defence.
- William Harold Barnard, Assistant Director (Engineering), Ministry of Defence.
- Howard Ormerod Barrett, Director General, The Machine Tool Trades Association. For services to Export.
- Charles Bell, Deputy Engineer Surveyor-in-Chief, Department of Trade.
- Frank Cuendet Blackmore, AFC, Principal Scientific Officer, Department of Transport.
- Thomas Wallace Booth, Administrator, Family Practitioner Committee, Lancashire.
- Margaret Boys, lately Assistant Principal, Nelson & Colne College.
- Walter James Britton, Chairman, Savage Industries Ltd.
- Frank William Brooks, Chairman and Managing Director, A. A. Jones & Shipman Ltd, Leicester. For services to Export.
- Group Captain James Arthur Sheerman Brown (Retd.). For services to the Church of England Soldiers', Sailors' & Airmen's Clubs, Portsmouth.
- James Raby Brown, Principal Professional and Technology Officer, Department of the Environment.
- John Logan Brown, lately Director of Finance, Northern Ireland Housing Executive.
- Mary Ashwin Brown, Chairman, Barnsley National Insurance Local Tribunal.
- Arthur Ernest Burnham, Assistant Collector, Board of Customs & Excise.
- Ewen William Cameron, Deputy Chairman, Cumbernauld New Town Development Corporation.
- Edwin Frank Candlin, lately Principal, Oxford College of Further Education.
- Henry Hartrick Cavan, President, Irish Football Association.
- Winifred Elizabeth Cavenagh. For services to Wages Councils.
- Frederick William Chadwick, TD, Member, North Yorkshire County Council.
- Sidney Chaplin, lately Chairman, Northern Arts Literature Panel.
- Professor Charles Geddes Coull Chesters. For services to education.
- Ursula Elizabeth Chesterton, Architect and Planning Consultant.
- John Bogle Chinery, DSO, lately Assistant Director-General (Licensing), Greater London Council.
- Evelyn Cleverly, Director, Girls' Nautical Training Corps.
- Reginald Victor Cole, lately Group Services Controller, British Road Services Ltd, National Freight Corporation.
- Mary Eileen Coombe, District Nursing Officer, Northamptonshire Area Health Authority.
- Ronald John Primrose Cowan, ERD, Senior Partner, Cowan & Linn, Consulting Civil Engineers, Glasgow.
- George Robert Cowie, Secretary, The Queen's University Belfast.
- Samuel William Craigie, Chief Project Engineer, Armaments, M. L. Aviation Co. Ltd, Slough. For services to Export.
- John Alexander Crichton, Deputy Director of Water, Strathclyde Regional Council.
- Eric John Ronald Crowther. For services to the Welfare of Overseas Students.
- The Reverend Canon Fred Matthias Cubbon. For services to the community in the Isle of Man.
- Robert Henry Cummings, Chairman and Senior Managing Director, Robertson Research International Ltd.
- Marcus James Cummins, Member, Board of Visitors, HM Prison Maidstone.
- The Reverend Colin Cuttell. For services to the South London Industrial Mission.
- George Raymond Davies, Director, The Booksellers Association of Great Britain & Ireland.
- James Owen Davies. For services to local government in Clwyd.
- John Wingett Davies, Chairman, British Cinematograph Theatres Ltd. For services to the Cinematograph Films Council.
- Arthur William Dent, lately Member, Oxford Regional Health Authority.
- Peter John Derham, Deputy Chief Inspector of Fisheries, Ministry of Agriculture, Fisheries & Food.
- Leonard Charles Dolby, QPM, Deputy Chief Constable, Thames Valley Police.
- Richard Patrick Archibald Douglas, Solicitor, National Ports Council.
- Laurence Dowdall, Solicitor, Messrs. Hughes Dowdall & Co., Glasgow.
- Captain Geoffrey Eke Downs, Managing Director and Deputy Chairman, Wilson Walton Engineering Ltd.
- Frank Peter Doyle, Chairman, Research Division, Beecham Pharmaceuticals.
- Eric Thomas Duke, General Manager, Government Training Centres, Department of Manpower Services, Northern Ireland.
- Anne Caroline Duncan, Principal Nursing Officer, Muckamore Abbey Hospital, Antrim.
- William Albert Dutton, Director of Research, Hosiery & Allied Trades Research Association.
- Howard Frederick John Edwards, Senior Inspector of Taxes, Board of Inland Revenue.
- Maurice Herbert Edwards, lately Foreign & Commonwealth Office.
- Thomas Raymond Edwards, Principal, Welsh College of Music & Drama.
- Arnold Elliott, General Medical Practitioner, Ilford, Essex.
- Mary Ellison, lately Co-ordinator of In-Service Training, Education Department, Salop County Council.
- David Barry Ercolani, Joint Managing Director, Furniture Industries Ltd. For services to Export.
- Edith Evans, lately Registrar, Royal Entomological Society of London.
- John Wilfred Kennicott Evans, Deputy Chairman, North Western Electricity Board.
- Nigel Keith Evans, Marketing Director, Platt Saco Lowell. For services to Export.
- Samuel Jenkin Evans. For services to the community in Cleveland.
- Geoffrey Howard Fletcher, TD, General Dental Practitioner, Middlesbrough.
- Andrew Forman, Divisional Officer, Scotland, Union of Shop, Distributive and Allied Workers.
- Arthur Ronald Franks, Director, Trebor (Overseas) Ltd. For services to Export.
- Phyllis Joan Gaddum, Secretary, Family Welfare Association, Manchester.
- Victor Alec Gardiner, Director and General Manager, London Weekend Television Ltd.
- Colin Gaskell, QPM, lately Deputy Chief Constable, West Midlands Police.
- William Brian Godfrey, Adviser, Catholic Education Council.
- Leonard Charles Grant, Secretary and Chief Accountant, Royal Opera House, Covent Garden Ltd.
- John Craig Rose Greig, lately Physician, Western Isles Health Board.
- Donald Honey Grist, Agriculturalist, Consultant and writer in tropical agriculture.
- Arthur Albert Hammond, Chief Commandant, Metropolitan Police Special Constabulary.
- Eric Albert Barratt Hammond, Executive Councillor, Electrical, Electronic, Telecommunications and Plumbing Union.
- George Alfred Harding, Senior Principal Scientific Officer, Royal Greenwich Observatory.
- Milton Hargreaves, Clerk to the Justices, South Bedfordshire.
- Frederick William Hathaway, lately Chief Accountant, Court Funds Office, Lord Chancellor's Department.
- Ralph Havery, Chief Fire Officer, Devon Fire Brigade.
- Sidney Charles Heaven. For services to education including education in prisons.
- John Trueman Henshaw, Senior Lecturer in Mechanical Engineering, University of Salford.
- Humphrey James Higginbottom, Regional Member, North-West Region, National Savings Committee.
- Edward Samuel Higgins, Director of Social Services, London Borough of Wandsworth.
- William Edward Hobbs, Divisional Manager, Marconi-Elliott, Avionics Systems Ltd.
- John Francis Nicholas Hodgkinson, Registrar, University of Keele.
- John Nicholas Holmes, Farmer, Suffolk. For services to agriculture.
- Kenneth Holman Holmes, Industrial Editor, Eastern Counties Newspapers.
- Arthur Vernon Robert Hooker, Director, W. S. Atkins & Partners, Consulting Engineers, South Wales.
- Eric John Hosking, Photographer and Ornithologist.
- Frankie Howerd (Francis Alick Howard), Entertainer.
- Douglas Hughes, Director, Whitechapel Bell Foundry Ltd.
- Edward William Hughes, Director of Adult Education, University of Newcastle.
- George Leslie Hughes, Senior Principal, Department of Health & Social Security.
- Joseph Edward Hulme. For services to the magistracy in Stoke-on-Trent.
- Enoch Humphries, National President, Fire Brigades Union.
- Alfred John Herbert Hunt, Consultant, Bristol Engine Group, Rolls-Royce (1971) Ltd.
- William Leslie Hutchison, General Secretary, Northern Clubs' Federation Brewery Ltd. For services to co-operative brewing.
- Reginald Hutt, Company Chief Inspector, Yorkshire Imperial Metals Ltd.
- George Gordon Jackson. For services to the Scottish fishing industry.
- Walter Jackson, lately Director Operations, General Steels Division, British Steel Corporation.
- Gwynfryn Lewis James, MBE, DL. For services to the Royal British Legion in Wales.
- Leonard George Johnes, Director, Lee Valley Regional Park Authority.
- John Gwilym Jones, Chairman, Trustee Savings Bank of Wales and Border Counties.
- John Morris Jones, Chairman and Managing Director, General Site Services Group of Companies. For services to the construction industry.
- Philip Mark Jones, Director, Philip Jones Brass Ensemble.
- Rachel Walley Kelly, For services to the Trent Regional Health Authority.
- Cyril Irving Kempson, lately General Secretary, Barclays Group Staff Association.
- Edward Arthur Lainson, Chairman, Premier Travel Group of Companies, Cambridge.
- John Walter Chaplin Ledger, Head Postmaster, Bristol, South Western Postal Region, Post Office.
- John Kenneth Ledlie, Principal, Ministry of Defence.
- John Vernon Leigh, MBE, Director General, Asphalt & Coated Macadam Association.
- Desmond Fitzwilliam Lewis, Secretary and Registrar, The Pharmaceutical Society of Great Britain.
- Wyndham George Lewis, Chairman, South Wales Regional Committee, Variety Club of Great Britain.
- John Ross Little, Chief Constable, Tayside Police.
- Sam Longson, President and Chairman, Derby County Football Club.
- Percy John Follett Luget, lately Headmaster, Henbury School, Bristol.
- Miles Vincent McCann, Chairman, Southern Panel, Local Enterprise Development Unit.
- Hugh Sinclair Macdonald, DL, Architect.
- Douglas Haig McIntosh, Chief Scientist, Caledonian Sector, United Kingdom Warning and Monitoring Organisation.
- Laurence Mair, lately Director of Environmental Health, Newcastle City Council.
- Lilian Mary Margerison, Chairman, Lancashire County Branch, Soldiers', Sailors' & Airmen's Families Association.
- Norman Stanley Marsh, lately Chief Fire Service Officer, Ministry of Defence.
- George Harold Marshall, Headmaster, Exhall Grange School for Partially Sighted & Physically Handicapped Children, Coventry.
- Alexander Logan Rowatt Mayer, Chief Medical Officer, Benenden Chest Hospital.
- David Ormond Michel, Member, Post Office Users' National Council.
- William George Norman Miller, Executive Director, Save & Prosper Group Ltd.
- George Dewar Monteath, Head, Radio Frequency Group and Head, Research Department, British Broadcasting Corporation.
- Edith Rosamond Morgan, Divisional Nursing Officer (Midwifery), South Gwent District.
- Evan Thomas Morgan, Principal, Leith Nautical College.
- Peggy Dina Nuttall, Associate Director, Medical Division (London), McMillan Journals.
- Mary Vere Oddie. For services to conservation.
- Sarah Ann Ogden, Member, Manchester City Council.
- William Thompson Oliver, lately Deputy Editor, Yorkshire Post.
- Peter John O'Sullevan. For services to horseracing.
- James Raymond Owen, Medical Adviser, British Olympic Association.
- Bruce Parkinson, Vice Chairman, National Association of Boys' Clubs.
- John Henry Parsons. For services to the veterinary profession.
- Frank Partridge. For services to the community in Banbury, Oxfordshire.
- Charles Anthony Pini, Cellist.
- William Henry Baggott Porter, lately Director of Engineering, North West Region, British Gas Corporation.
- Stephen Prudhoe, Principal Scientific Officer, British Museum (Natural History).
- Elsie Ratcliff, Staff Adviser for Education of Young Children, Cheshire Education Authority.
- Victoria Mitchell-Rawles, Headmistress, Beech Hill High School, Luton.
- Marian Maxwell Reekie, lately Deputy County Superintendent, Greater Manchester, St. John Ambulance Brigade.
- Peter Percy Barkel Rickard, Senior Principal, Department of the Environment.
- Waheeb Rizk, Managing Director, GEC Gas Turbines Ltd. For services to Export.
- Arthur Charles Robb, MBE, lately Consultant, United Kingdom Steering Committee on Superannuation.
- Griffith Wyn Roberts, Area Medical Officer, Clwyd Area Health Authority.
- John Edward Roberts, Principal Scientific Officer, Ministry of Defence.
- Charles Henry Rodgers, MBE, Assistant Chief Constable, Royal Ulster Constabulary.
- Alan John Rowe, General Medical Practitioner, Bury St. Edmunds.
- Angus Smith Roy, Chairman, West Metropolitan Conciliation Committee, Race Relations Board.
- Jack Rubin. For charitable services in Liverpool.
- Denis Astley Sanford. For services to community planning.
- Leslie Richard Sillitoe, General Secretary, The Ceramic and Allied Trades Union.
- Charles William Simms, Director and Chief Executive, Dundee and Tayside Chamber of Commerce & Industry. For services to Export.
- Claude William Smith, Principal Examiner, Patent Office.
- Edna Smith, Principal, Knuston Hall, Residential College for Adult Education.
- Frances Smith. For services to Ladies Golf.
- Colonel Douglas Norman Spratt, TD, Selected Military Member of the Lowlands of Scotland Territorial, Auxiliary & Volunteer Reserve Association.
- Robin Stirling (Robert Colin Baillie Stirling), Editor-in-Chief, Motherwell Times & Bellshill Speaker.
- Alexander George Stone, Research Manager, John Laing Research & Development Ltd.
- Reginald Ernest Tapping. For services to disabled ex-servicemen.
- Robert Francis Neil Taylor, Chief Administrative Officer, Western Health & Social Services Board, Northern Ireland.
- Frank Lewis Templeman, Principal Regional Officer, Yorkshire & Humberside Regional Sports Council.
- Frank Albert Terry, DFC, Chief Probation Officer, Cornwall Probation & After-Care Service.
- Oswald Terry, TD, lately Under-Treasurer, Gray's Inn.
- Arthur Leonard Thomas. For services to mining and technical education in Cornwall.
- Richard Benjamin Thomas, QPM, Chief Constable, Dyfed-Powys Police.
- George Barton Thompson, Director, Ulster Folk & Transport Museum.
- John James Thompson, Senior Principal, Department of Employment.
- Frederick John Tranter, lately Principal Professional and Technology Officer, Ministry of Defence.
- P. L. Travers (Miss Pamela Lyndon Travers), Author.
- Hans George Tuchler, Headmaster, Ravensdale Middle School, Mansfield.
- Samuel Humfrey Gaskell Twining, Export Director, R. Twining & Co. Ltd. For services to Export.
- Jeremiah Nicholas Twohig, Senior Medical Officer Department of Health & Social Security.
- Margery Urquhart, Depute Director of Social Work, Grampian Region.
- James Purves Utterson, Deputy Chairman and Managing Director, International Aeradio Ltd.
- William Kenneth Vaux, Headmaster, Paddington Comprehensive School, Liverpool.
- James Oswald Noel Vickers, General Secretary, Civil Service Union and Chairman, Staff Side, Civil Service National Whitley Council.
- The Right Honourable Nancy Louisa, Baroness Walpole, President/Chairman, Norfolk Branch, British Red Cross Society.
- Philip Harry Warne, Captain, RRS Shackleton, Natural Environment Research Council.
- Geoffrey Morris Warren, TD, Sales Director, Aveling-Barford Ltd. For services to Export.
- Gordon Sword Watson, DL, Town Clerk and Chief Executive, City of Dundee District Council.
- Ralph Edward Weston, Senior Principal Scientific Officer, Laboratory of the Government Chemist.
- Captain Harry Bell Whitehead. For services to the Royal British Legion.
- Mary Margaret Whittingham, District Nursing Officer, Birmingham Area Health Authority.
- Basil Dennis Wigginton, Governor, HM Prison Brixton.
- The Reverend Anthony William Williamson, Member, Oxford City Council.
- John Edward Wood, Director, Doncaster Area, National Coal Board.
- Alexander Wotherspoon, Assistant Chief Engineer, Scottish Development Department.
- George Herbert Wyatt, Chairman, Herefordshire Community Council.

Diplomatic Service and Overseas List

- Robert Louis Barclay. For services to University education in Ghana.
- Solomon Matthew Bard, MBE, ED. For services to the community in Hong Kong.
- Cyril Debeausire Barnard. For public and community services in St. Vincent.
- Geoffrey Barraclough. For services to the British community in Japan.
- Harold Bennett. For public services in the Falkland Islands.
- Captain Theophilis Rearie Bodden. For public services in the Cayman Islands.
- Frederick Charles Peoley Bowen. For public services in Belize.
- Lalage Jean Bown. For services to Adult Education in Nigeria.
- John Godrey Boyle. For services to the British community in New Delhi.
- Anthony Thomas Bradfield. For services to the British community in Cyprus.
- Richard Gordon Bridgen. For services to British commercial interests and the British community in Japan.
- John Alexander Couldrey. For services to the British community in Kenya.
- Oliver Tom Cunningham. For services to British cultural and commercial interests in Brazil.
- Robert James Daniels. For services to British commercial interests in Saudi Arabia.
- Peter Errington Dawson. For services to the British community in Portugal.
- Captain Donald Alexander Robert Delf, RNR. For public services in Gibraltar.
- William Dorward, Deputy Director, Commerce and Industry Department, Hong Kong.
- Victor Dumas, JP. For public services in Gibraltar.
- Clarence Patrick Erskine-Lindop, Permanent Secretary, Ministry of Agriculture, Fisheries & Local Government, Bahamas.
- Edith Gwendoline Friend, MBE. For welfare services to the community in St. Lucia.
- John Anthony Frost, Financial Secretary, British Virgin Islands.
- Reginald Carmel Frank Gallia. Honorary British Consul, İzmir, Turkey.
- Patrick Terence O'Kelly Gardner, MBE, lately First Secretary and Consul, HM Embassy, Beirut.
- Montague Goodman. For services to the British community and British commercial interests in Belgium.
- Leonard Charles Harrison. For services to the Development of public transport in The Gambia.
- Kingsley Ashwell Hart. For services to Anglo-Finnish relations.
- Squadron Leader Arthur William Hayes, MBE. For services to the Development of Civil Aviation in Swaziland.
- John Patrick Holloway, CPM, Commissioner of Police, Solomon Islands.
- Michael John Hulse, Permanent Secretary, Ministry of Home Affairs, Belize.
- Richard Alfred Irving. For services to British commercial and cultural interests in Venezuela.
- Penelope Joan Key. For medical and welfare services to children in Cambodia.
- Arthur Denley King, Honorary British Consul, Punta Arenas, Chile.
- Raymond Krinker. For services to the British community and British commercial interests in Brazil.
- John Dixon Leefe. For services to forestry development in Cyprus.
- Gordon Evershed Lyth. Director of Audit, Hong Kong.
- Justin Patrick Charles McCarthy. For services to the British community in Mexico.
- Thomas James Rew Macara. For services to the British community in Buenos Aires.
- John Keith Macgaul. For services to British commercial interests in Venezuela.
- Angus Norman Macleod. For services to the British community and British commercial interests in Southern India.
- Matthew Macmillan, First Secretary (Education), British High Commission, New Delhi.
- Archibald Lowry de Montfort. For services to the British community in Sri Lanka.
- Francis Raymond Morgan, HM Consul (Information) British Consulate-General, Sydney.
- Wilfred Hillier Newton, lately Director, Productivity Council, Hong Kong.
- Ewart Charles George Lock Parsons. For services to the British community in Iran.
- Arthur Stanley Payne, lately Head of Chancery, British High Commission, Dacca.
- Mainwaring Bainbridge Pescod. For services to technical education in Thailand.
- Kenneth Thomas Petrie-Ritchie. For services to British commercial interests in Lebanon.
- John Clark Philip, First Secretary, British Deputy High Commission, Kaduna, Nigeria.
- Robert Maxwell Taberer Phillips, MBE, Chief Project Officer, Rural Development Department, Lesotho.
- The Reverend William Philip Basil Pitt. For services to the British community in Cyprus.
- Hilda Plummer. For medical and welfare services to lepers in Indis.
- William Frederick Barry Price, HM Consul-General, Rotterdam.
- George Robert Raymond. For educational services to the community in Zaire.
- John David Read. For services to the British community in Japan.
- Belgrave Obed Robinson, Chief Education Officer, Education Department, Dominica.
- Oswald James Horsley Robinson, First Secretary, HM Embassy Bangkok.
- John Frederick Robson. For services to the British community in Iraq.
- Gordon Rutherford, First Secretary (Commercial), British High Commission, Wellington.
- Thomas Francis Shaxson, lately Principal Land Husbandry Officer, Ministry of Agriculture, Malawi.
- James Smith, Director of Public Works, Bermuda.
- Duncan Hugh Spencer, lately British Council Representative, Sweden.
- John Stafford, First Secretary (Commercial), British High Commission, New Delhi.
- David James Stockley. For services to agricultural development in Bangladesh.
- Bernard Stanley Swift. For services to British commercial interests in Latin America.
- Arthur Talbott. For services to British commercial interests in Belgium.
- Arthur Raymond Thompson. For services to British Commercial interests in Italy.
- Walter Gordon Tracy. For services to Anglo-Nigerian relations.
- William Joseph Vose. First Secretary (Labour) HM Embassy, Pretoria.
- Alan Howard Ward. For services to University education in developing countries in Africa.
- Edward Gene Williams, MBE, Principal Assistant Secretary, Finance Department, Lesotho.
- Po-yan Wong. For public services in Hong Kong.
- Deane Yates. For services to education in Botswana.

Australian States

State of New South Wales

- Myles Joseph Dunphy. For services to conservation.
- Alan James Gordon. For services to commerce and the community.
- Clarice Maud Lorenz. For services to the community.
- John Henry Olsen. For services to art.
- Helen Halse Rogers. For services to the State and the community.
- Norman Bede Rydge. For services to commerce and the community.
- Rodney Frederick Marsden Seaborn. For services to the community and to medicine.
- Peter James Seymour. For services to music.
- Donald Robert Shanks. For services to opera.
- Thomas Henry Williams. For services to Aborigines.

State of Victoria

- Professor David Edmund Caro, of South Yarra. For services to education and science.
- George Clement Hill, of Toorak. For services to banking and finance.
- Ian William Johnson, MBE, of Middle Park. For services to sports administration.
- Eric Oswald McCutchan, of Ivanhoe. For services to sports administration.
- George Pearce Mackenzie, of Hawthorn. For services to the community.
- Hilton John Nicholas, of Lower Plenty. For services to racing and finance.
- Leslie Marsh Perrott, of Mount Waverley. For services to town planning and the community.
- Donald Francis Spring, of Toorak. For services to dentistry.
- Peter Nelson Thwaites, of Kew. For services to education.

State of Queensland

- Councillor George Leslie Crawford, of Kingaroy. For services to local government and the dairying industry.
- Alderman Alan Douglas Hollindle, of Southport. For services to the dairying industry and community.
- James Edward Kidd, lately Mayor of Gympie.
- Ronald Francis Muller, of Chrystalbrook. For services to local government and the community.
- Councillor Duncan Cargill Sturrock, of Drillham. For services to local government and the community.
- Alan St. John Underwood, of Coorparoo. For services to journalism.

State of Western Australia

- Francis Stewart Cross, of Ravenswood. For services in the field of industrial relations.
- Dorothy Dettman, of Swanbourne. For services to the community.
- Hubert Leake Shields. For services in light land development and local government.

==== Member of the Order of the British Empire (MBE) ====
Military Division

Royal Navy

- Lieutenant Commander David Anderson.
- Lieutenant Commander (SD) Richard John Buscombe.
- Lieutenant Commander (SD) Sydney James Dean.
- Lieutenant Commander (SD) Thomas William Drean.
- Fleet Chief Petty Officer (SEA) William James Feltham, BEM, J153073G.
- Lieutenant Commander (SCC) Edward John Franklin, RD, Royal Naval Reserve.
- Lieutenant Commander (SD) Joseph Thomas Franks.
- Lieutenant Commander Roger Noel Guy.
- Lieutenant Commander Keir Stewart Hett.
- The Reverend Anthony Ian Hulse.
- First Officer Ellen McKenzie McQueen, VRD*, Women's Royal Naval Reserve.
- Second Officer Shelagh Georgina Phillips, Women's Royal Naval Service.
- Lieutenant (SD) Robert Michael Punchard.
- Captain (SD) Ralph Thomas Frederick Rigden, Royal Marines.
- Lieutenant Commander (SD) Victor Edward Webb.

Army

- Captain Alan John Abbott (490718), Intelligence Corps.
- Major Richard John Abbott (463455), Army Air Corps.
- Captain Amos Maxwell Alderton (477003), The Royal Hussars (Prince of Wales's Own).
- Major (Quartermaster) Hugh Oswald Bailey, MM, (479817), 1st The Queen's Dragoon Guards.
- Major Gordon Barnett (457099), Royal Corps of Signals.
- Major (Quartermaster) Peter Edward Barton (476429), Corps of Royal Military Police.
- Major Richard Claude Blunt (384748), Royal Corps of Transport.
- Major Dennis Frederick Leslie Bonney (480070), Corps of Royal Engineers.
- 22723100 Warrant Officer Class 1 Richard Campbell, The Parachute Regiment (now Discharged).
- Captain (Adviser Infantry Weapons) Ronald Glenville Church (493312), Small Arms School Corps.
- 23960536 Warrant Officer Class 1 Edward Thomas Frederick Clark, The Queen's Regiment, Territorial and Army Volunteer Reserve.
- Major Richard Scamander Clarke, MC, (366696), The Light Infantry (now Retd.).
- Major Ian Watson Dunkeld (472238), Corps of Royal Engineers.
- Captain (Quartermaster) Robert Cecil Edger (485073), The Royal Regiment of Wales (24th/41st Foot).
- Reverend John James Fail, Chaplain to the Forces, Third Class (Acting Chaplain to the Forces Second Class) (462536), Royal Army Chaplains' Department.
- Major Graham David Farrell (461188), The Parachute Regiment.
- Captain (Acting Major) Martin Dudley Franks (482888), The Royal Anglian Regiment.
- Captain Denys Michael Gill (486855), Corps of Royal Engineers.
- 23238554 Warrant Officer Class 1 Patrick David Goat, Corps of Royal Electrical & Mechanical Engineers.
- Major Stephen Dear Gray (434736), Royal Regiment of Artillery.
- 23877545 Warrant Officer Class 2 Martin James Hagger, Intelligence Corps.
- Captain George Richard Hooton (488938), Irish Guards.
- Major (now Lieutenant Colonel) Miles Garth Hunt-Davies (466744), 6th Queen Elizabeth's Own Gurkha Rifles.
- Major John Edward Kendall (459279), The Light Infantry.
- Major (Queen's Gurkha Officer) Kesarsing Limbu (477390), 7th Duke of Edinburgh's Own Gurkha Rifles.
- Major (Quartermaster) Sydney Herbert Kirk (482281), The Duke of Wellington's Regiment (West Riding).
- Major Julian Nelson Knowles (440066), Royal Regiment of Artillery.
- Major (Acting) Walter John Lees (389740), Army Cadet Force, Territorial & Army Volunteer Reserve.
- 23496953 Warrant Officer Class 1 Roger Middleton-Jones, Corps of Royal Military Police.
- Major (Quartermaster) Gordon Ross Mitchell, BEM, (471602) Scots Guards.
- 23237207 Warrant Officer Class 1 Terence Reginald Moxham 5th Royal Inniskilling Dragoon Guards.
- Major (Quartermaster) Dora Edith May Nightingale (441496), Women's Royal Army Corps (now Retd.).
- Major (Quartermaster) Derek Ivor Oxley (477468), Corps of Royal Engineers.
- 23481580 Warrant Officer Class 1 Raymond Keith Page, Royal Army Ordnance Corps.
- Major (Quartermaster) Ronald Sidney Page (473266), Royal Regiment of Artillery.
- Major (Ordnance Executive Officer) Clive Robinson (483350), Royal Army Ordnance Corps.
- 23961964 Warrant Officer Class 2 Edwin Walter Smith, Special Air Service Regiment, Territorial & Army Volunteer Reserve.
- Captain (Honorary) Frederick John Smith, TD, (47942), Combined Cadet Force, Territorial & Army Volunteer Reserve (now Retd.).
- 23659442 Warrant Officer Class 2 Reginald Tayler, Royal Army Medical Corps.
- Major Roger John Theis (453058), Corps of Royal Military Police.
- Major (Staff Quartermaster) John Rowland Thomas (477062), Royal Army Ordnance Corps.

Royal Air Force

- Squadron Leader Stuart Michael St. Clair Collins (2617723).
- Squadron Leader David James Harris (4335131).
- Squadron Leader Reginald Marshall Hartley (189764), (Retd.).
- Squadron Leader Leighton Hugh Jenkins (2465387).
- Squadron Leader William John Kirby (4175995).
- Squadron Leader Richard Henry Kyle (609247).
- Squadron Leader James Robert Worthington Laing (4335372).
- Squadron Leader John Ivor Morgan-Jones (3138907), RAF Regiment.
- Squadron Leader Michael John Neil (3133792).
- Squadron Leader Ann Veronica Margaret Palmer (2836026), Women's Royal Air Force.
- Squadron Leader Donald William Rule (3500409).
- Squadron Leader Charles Edward Slater, DFC, AFC, (1305635).
- Squadron Leader Arthur William Vine, AFC, AFM, (1323588).
- Acting Squadron Leader Alan Jones (207358), Royal Air Force Volunteer Reserve (Training Branch).
- Flight Lieutenant Stefano Episcopo (4230792).
- Flight Lieutenant John Leslie Greenhalgh (4335750).
- Flying Officer Roy Axford (587401).
- Warrant Officer George James Everett (RO554024).
- Warrant Officer James Desmond Fitzgerald (X1911582).
- Warrant Officer Neil Michael Hanrahan (K2397582).
- Warrant Officer Michael Headley (R3513245).
- Warrant Officer Stanley Joseph Hughes (T4093408).
- Warrant Officer Philip James Maunder, BEM, (N1478392), RAF Regiment.
- Warrant Officer George Alexander Scott (E3084053).
- Warrant Officer Margaret Gladys Sharp (H2023254), Women's Royal Air Force.
- Warrant Officer Brian Hamilton Smale (Q4025634).
- Warrant Officer Thomas Richard Thrussell (S0773191).
- Warrant Officer John Madog Williams, BEM, (BO571061).
- Master Air Electronics Operator David Gordon Richard Nicholls (Y3512397).

Overseas Award

- Squadron Leader Luiz Maria Souza, AE, Royal Hong Kong Auxiliary Air Force.

Civil Division

- Bennie Abrahams, Member, Newcastle upon Tyne City Council.
- Charles Macnair Anderson. For services to The Scout Association in Glasgow.
- Thomas James Anderson. For services to music in the Shetland Isles.
- William Smith Anderson. For services to Highland Games.
- Marjorie Winnifred Baird, Housing Welfare Officer, Greater London Council.
- Cecil Frank Baker, Secretary, Eastbourne Lifeboat Station, Royal National Life Boat Institute.
- John Metcalfe Ball, Area Commissioner, Western Area, Surrey, St. John Ambulance Brigade.
- Annie Mary (Mollie) Barker, Commissioner, Northampton Division, The Girls' Brigade.
- Norman John Barnes, lately Director of Music, King Edward VII School, Sheffield.
- Joan Barter, Headmistress, Westcott Church of England First School, Dorking, Surrey.
- Ivan Lancelot Bawtree. For services to The Boys' Brigade.
- Samuel Baxter. For services to the fishing industry.
- Maurice Beevers, lately Area Distribution Engineer (North), East Midlands Region, British Gas Corporation.
- George Nicholls Begley, lately Liaison Officer, Remploy Ltd, Scotland.
- Sam Hanna Bell, Writer and Broadcaster, Northern Ireland.
- Eileen Elizabeth Biestro, Secretary, Beaconsfield Old People's Welfare Committee.
- Norman Bisby, DL, Deputy Chairman, Yorkshire Area, Transport Users' Consultative Committee.
- Tudor Alun Blythin, lately Divisional Nursing Officer, Cornwall Area Health Authority.
- Frederick Cecil Bobbit, Clerical Officer, Board of Inland Revenue.
- George Gordon Bolton, lately Headquarters Secretariat Officer, League of Red Cross Societies, Geneva.
- Edwin William Fearless Boryer, lately Professional and Technology Officer I, Ministry of Defence.
- Emily Brain, General Secretary, Colostomy Welfare Group.
- Mary Hunter Brodie. For services to the Royal British Legion in Scotland.
- Austin Brooks, Chairman, Northern Regional Educational Savings Committee.
- Llewelyn Charles Browning, lately Special Projects Investigator, Doncaster (Blaenavon) Ltd, Gwent.
- Beatrice Rose Campbell Bruges, lately County Clothing Organiser, Wiltshire, Women's Royal Voluntary Service.
- Henry George William Bucknell, Export Director, Multico Co. Ltd. For services to Export.
- Rita Joyce Burningham Welfare Officer (Ilford Region), The Plessey Co. Ltd.
- Victor William Burrows, Senior Nursing Officer, St Audry's Hospital, Suffolk Area Health Authority.
- Dorothy Marjorie Joyce Buswell, Headmistress, Little Kingshill County Combined School, Great Missenden, Buckinghamshire.
- Benjamin Walter Butler, Senior Executive Officer, Board of Customs & Excise.
- Anne Elizabeth Butt. For services to the Friends of Gloucester Cathedral.
- Richard Dilworth Buxton. For services to the Royal Air Forces Association, Leicester Branch.
- Charles John Cadwell, Founder and Organiser, Tape Recording Service for the Blind.
- Thomas Christopher Calvert. For services to the community in Wensleydale.
- Theodosia Helen Cambridge. For services as a Remedial Teacher in Godalming.
- Duncan Campbell, Senior Executive Officer, Department of Health & Social Security.
- Elizabeth Campbell, Head Teacher, Vatersay Primary School, Barra.
- John Charles Campbell, Chief Superintendent, Royal Ulster Constabulary.
- Sidney Allan Cardy, Executive Officer, Department of Health & Social Security.
- Elizabeth Ann Carroll, Headmistress, The Castle Girls' School, Ludgershall, Wiltshire.
- Frederick Robert Carter, lately Senior Conservation Officer, Welsh Folk Museum, Cardiff.
- Gwyneth Naomi Cashen, lately Sister-in-Charge, Geriatric day hospital, Newsham General Hospital, Liverpool.
- Ruth Chamberlain, Councillor, Wyre Forest District Council.
- Lillian Rose Ellen Chandler, Clerical Officer, Department of the Environment.
- Walter David McDonogh Chapman, Manager, Ground Support (Fairford), British Aircraft Corporation Ltd.
- Kodwani Moolchand Chetty, Senior Physiotherapist, Philipshill Hospital, Glasgow.
- Stanley Chown, Chef/Manager, Pembroke College, Cambridge. For services to Catering.
- Alan David Chun. For services to the community, particularly the elderly, in Bitterne and Woolston.
- Frederick William Clarke. For services to disabled children and older people in Suffolk.
- Frank Stanley Claxton, County Twinning Secretary, Devon County Council.
- Joyce Mary Clive, Chapter Clerk, York Minster.
- Alfred James Coles Member, South East Economic Planning Council.
- Barbara May Louise Collins, Valuation Clerk Higher Grade, Board of Inland Revenue.
- Kenneth Herbert Collins, Inspector of Taxes, Board of Inland Revenue.
- Michael Leonard Compton, Accident Prevention Officer, Port of London Authority.
- Harry Conlan, Area Manager (Enniskillen), Northern Ireland Carriers Ltd.
- John Alfred Eli Cook, Member, East Anglia Economic Planning Council.
- Thomas William Cooper, Electrical Manager and Production Co-ordinator, Cammell Laird Shipbuilders Ltd.
- Reginald Bruce Copleston, lately Superintendent (Thames Tunnels), Department of Mechanical & Electrical Engineering, Greater London Council.
- Albert James Copper, Clerical Officer, Metropolitan Police Office.
- Betty Corbridge, lately Office Superintendent, Regional Advisory Council for Technological Education, London and Home Counties.
- Harold Frederick Michael Corrigan, Head Forester, Department of Agriculture, Northern Ireland.
- Ernest James Crocker, Clerical Officer, Department of Health & Social Security.
- Amy Elizabeth Crockford, Adventure Playground Leader, Haverhill.
- Theodore Crombie, Depute Director of Administration and Legal Services, City of Glasgow District Council.
- Doris Nellie Maud Crowe, Personal Secretary, Crown Estate Commissioners.
- James Crutchley, QPM, Superintendent, Royal Ulster Constabulary.
- Alice Culver, Tax Officer Higher Grade, Board of Inland Revenue.
- Kenneth Roy Cundy, Senior Scientific Officer, Home Office.
- Muriel Costello Currie, lately Vice-Chairman, Association of Women's Royal Naval Service, Birmingham.
- Gerald Thomas Cutland, lately Catering Officer, RRS John Biscoe, Natural Environment Research Council.
- James Davidson, Chief Wireless Technician, Northern Ireland Office.
- John Lewis Davies, Area Industrial Relations Officer, South Wales Area, National Coal Board.
- Jerry Dawson (John Norman Dawson), lately Chairman, Manchester Press Charities Committee.
- George Oliver Day, DSM, Higher Executive Officer, House of Lords.
- John Harrison Daykin, Area Chief Ambulance Officer, Norfolk Area Health Authority.
- Pamela Joan Devine, District Careers Officer, Central South District, Liverpool Education Authority.
- Dorothy de Zalan, Secretary, Displaced Persons Welfare Committee, Herford Garrison, Germany.
- John Dudley Dixon, DSC, Home Secretary, United Society for the Propagation of the Gospel.
- Denis Patrick Dorgan, TD, Higher Executive Officer, Department of Health & Social Security.
- Elsie Douglas, Nursing Officer, Gateshead Area Health Authority.
- Ronald Frederick William Dowling, Youth Leader, Elmhurst Youth Centre, Aylesbury.
- Edward Doyle, Departmental Manager, Motherwell Bridge Engineering Ltd.
- David John Duckham. For services to Rugby Football.
- Veronica Evelyn Dupre, Sister, Outpatients Department, The Royal Marsden Hospital, London.
- Edna May Edgar, Member, Norfolk District Committee, Eastern Electricity Consultative Council.
- Daniel Edward Edwards, Divisional Organiser, Construction Section, Amalgamated Union of Engineering Workers.
- George Hunter Edwards, lately Senior Divisional Officer, Merseyside Fire Brigade.
- Lilian Gertrude May Ellison, Secretary, Button Division, Soldiers', Sailors', & Airmen's Families Association.
- Lawrence Fawcett, Commandant, St. Dunstan's Homes, Sussex.
- Dixie Rose Findlay, Member, Executive Committee, Church of England Children's Society.
- Hazel Finefrock, Civilian Administration Officer II, Ministry of Defence.
- Major Edmund Charles Fisher, Foreign & Commonwealth Office.
- Elizabeth Anne Horatia FitzRoy, Founder, The Elizabeth FitzRoy Homes for the Mentally Handicapped.
- Arthur Joseph Flockton, Chairman, Manchester Supplementary Benefit Appeal Tribunal.
- Gwendoline Edna Fortune. For services to the community in Herne Bay.
- Kenneth Whitaker Foster, Radio Overseer, Stonehaven Radio Station, External Telecommunications Executive, Post Office.
- Reginald Sharpe France, lately County Archivist, Lancashire County Council.
- Marjorie Helen Freeman, Head of Refugee Department, Headquarters, Women's Royal Voluntary Service.
- William Leslie Furlonger, Director, Lighting, Thames Television Ltd.
- James Alexander Stanley Gardner, Chairman, Ulster Savings Industrial Advisory Committee.
- Milton Gardner, Senior Technical Sales Engineer, Crofts (Engineers) Ltd.
- John Andrew Gavin, Divisional Officer, Iron and Steel Trades Confederation.
- Duncan Gay, Senior Scientific Officer, National Engineering Laboratory.
- Hugh McGuigan Gillett, Senior Administrative Officer, Scottish Certificate of Education Examination Board.
- Beatrice Mary Edith Purcell Gilpin, Personal Assistant to the President, Confederation of British Industry.
- Diana Rosalie Augusta Girling, lately Superintendent-Matron, Lyme Green Settlement for Paraplegics, Macclesfield.
- Maurice Glazer, Secretary, British Tenpin Bowling Association.
- John Glen, lately Assistant Research Manager, Research Centre, Scottish Division, British Steel Corporation.
- Major Andrew Gawen Goodman, TD. For services to the Royal British Legion.
- Sydney Goulton, Manager, Confectionery Department, Atkinsons of Windermere Ltd, Cumbria.
- Rosina Lilian Graham, lately Superintendent of Typists, Cabinet Office.
- Peter Gray, Works Manager, British Rail Engineering Ltd, British Railways Board.
- Stanley Gray, Company Engineer, Midlands, British Road Services Ltd, National Freight Corporation.
- Eric Preston Griffith. For services to the National Trust in Northumbria.
- Ronald Griffiths, Headteacher, Woodmansterne Primary School, London.
- John Hales, lately Charge Nurse, Burns Unit, Withington Hospital, Manchester Area Health Authority.
- Dorothy May Hallatt, Clothing Organiser, East Midland Region, Women's Royal Voluntary Service.
- Peter George Hancock, Managing Director, Hancocks Shipbuilding Co. (Pembroke) Ltd.
- William Valentine Hanlin, Assistant Director, National Trust for Scotland.
- Basil Watson Harley, lately Chairman, Mechanical and Production Engineering Advisory Committee, West Midlands Further Education Council.
- Irene Mary Harnan, Headmistress, Northside Primary School, Workington.
- Rex Linden Harnett, Administrative Assistant, Hampshire River and Water Division, Southern Water Authority.
- Ridley Harrison, Headmaster, Bolam Street Junior School, Newcastle upon Tyne.
- Olwen Muriel Harvey, Production Control Manager, Garringtons Ltd.
- William John Harwood, lately Professional and Technology Officer I, Ministry of Defence.
- Peter Paul Haughey, lately Telecommunications Technical Officer Grade "A", Civil Aviation Authority.
- Hilda Florence Hawnt, President, Northern Ireland Housewives' League.
- Grace Crombie Hay, Senior Personal Secretary, Scottish Development Department.
- Elizabeth Head, Senior Clerk, Wages. Department, Engineering Group, Vickers Ltd.
- Stanley George Head, Regional Manager, North Eastern Region, Home Service, Navy, Army & Air Force Institutes.
- Elizabeth Patricia Twistington Higgins, Painter.
- Rhoda Ann Higgins. For services to the community in Pershore and District.
- James Hill, lately Secretary, Scottish Area, National Association of Colliery Overmen, Deputies and Shotfirers.
- Janet Alison Hill, Principal Librarian (Zone Co-ordinator), London Borough of Lambeth.
- Norman Hird, Superintendent, Metropolitan Police.
- Kenneth Ninian Hoare, Director of Administration and Secretary, P.I.R.A.
- Desmond Roy Hobbs, Senior Investigation Officer, Board of Customs & Excise.
- Ronald Hopkins Works Manager, Ribble Motor Services Ltd, National Bus Company.
- James Hall Horrocks. For services to the furtherance of international understanding among journalists.
- Alexander James Horsfield, Deputy Chief Architect, Bracknell Development Corporation.
- John Howell, Chief Inspector, Staffordshire Police.
- Jean Hughes, Deputy Organiser, Citizen's Advice Bureau, Horsham.
- Ernest Hutchinson, Chief Executive, North Wolds District Council.
- Hilary Ruth Barnard Hutton, lately Chairman, Scottish Pre-school Playgroups Association.
- Leonard Thomas Hyder, Senior Executive Officer, Lord Chancellor's Department.
- Albert Henry Nelson Ingram, Clerk, Pinniger Finch & Co., Middleton & Upsall, Solicitors, Westbury.
- Annabella Burns Irvine, Head Teacher, Glencryan School, Cumbernauld.
- Mervin Denton Ishmael, Member, West Midlands Conciliation Committee, Race Relations Board.
- David William James. For services to local government in Dyfed.
- Harold Hubert Jenkins, Permanent Way Engineer, British Railways Board.
- Bernard Leslie Johnson, Executive Officer, Ministry of Defence.
- David Dorman Johnston, Headmaster, Percy Hedley School for Spastic Children, Forest Hall, Newcastle upon Tyne.
- Grace Eluned Davies-Jones. For services to music in Wales.
- George Herman Jubb, Senior Executive Officer, Department of Health & Social Security.
- Ellen Kay, Group Social Worker, Ward & Goldstone Ltd.
- Frank Keen, Group Transport Controller, George Wimpey & Co. Ltd.
- Christina Margaret Keith, Domiciliary Midwife, Hull District, Humberside Area Health Authority.
- Harry Alan Kennard, Secretary, Joint Committee for the Conservation of the Large Blue Butterfly.
- Ethel Madge King. For services to the community, particularly to child welfare, in Ampthill.
- Keith Edward Kissack, Curator, Nelson Museum and History Centre, Monmouth.
- Eric Douglas Kneale. For services to the Royal Air Forces Association in the Isle of Man.
- Barbara Mary Lancefield, Secretary to the Director-General, British Broadcasting Corporation.
- Alexander Charles Langford, Deputy Assistant Accountant, House of Commons.
- Muriel Langton, Private Secretary to the Chairman, Electricity Council.
- Mary Catherine Lapper, lately District Nurse/Midwife, Petersfield Hospital, Portsmouth Health District, Hampshire Area Health Authority.
- John Norman Laverack, Chief Engineer Officer, Ellerman Lines Ltd.
- Howard Trevor Lawrence, Group Engineer, Headquarters, Eastern Road Construction Unit.
- Arthur Leeming, Treasurer, National Dairymen's Association.
- Frances Levy, lately Personal Secretary to Chief Executive (Railways), British Railways Board.
- Peter Elias Rex Levy. For services to Cranleigh Village Hospital.
- George William Lochtie, Dental Surgeon, Darenth Park, Stone House, and Mabledon Hospitals.
- Marie McKenzie Low, Private Secretary to the Chief Constable, Strathclyde Police.
- Ada Helen Elizabeth Lowe, Clerical Officer, Department of Health & Social Security.
- John Elliot Lowther, Senior Executive Officer, Department of Employment.
- Alfred Joseph Lunney, Chief Fire Officer, Atomic Energy Research Establishment, Harwell.
- Marjory McFarlane McAinsh, Member, Parents' Committee, Grangemouth, Sea Cadet Corps.
- Christina Margaret Cowan MacBain, Nursing Sister, British Airports Authority.
- Donald James MacBean, lately Senior Executive Officer, Department of Transport.
- Owen Augustine McCabe, Professional and Technology Officer I, Department of Health & Social Security.
- Phyllis McCarthy, BEM. For services to the National Council of Social Service.
- David McClymont. For services to the community in Lanark.
- George Rheins McElwee, Principal, Vere Foster Primary School, Belfast.
- Margaret Rose McEneaney, Acting Housing Manager, Western Region, Northern Ireland Housing Executive.
- Robert Harrison McKinnon. For services to the friendly society movement in Scotland.
- Sarah McMahon, lately Sister, Ashington Hospital, Northumberland.
- Jacqueline Lucy Mary McMillan, Secretary, Mutual Households Association Ltd.
- Robert Ernest Main, lately Clerical Officer, Ministry of Agriculture, Fisheries & Food.
- Denis Frederick Malone, Project Engineer, Aviation Division, Dunlop Ltd.
- Edward Marston. For services to local government in Leicestershire.
- Margaret Elizabeth Martin, Sister-in-Charge, Medical Department, Imperial Metal Industries (Kynoch) Ltd.
- Arthur Frederick Edwin Masters, Clerical Officer, Department of the Environment.
- Arnold David Matthews, lately Principal Assistant (Immigrant Education), London Borough of Ealing.
- Sidney Alfred Matthews, TD, Director, English Folk Dance and Song Society.
- Florence Lucy Mayling, Nursing Officer, Eversley House, Hythe, Kent.
- Joyce Mein, Principal, Joint School of Orthoptics, Leeds.
- Doris Evelyn Mellor. For services to the community in Windsor.
- Frances Jane Harvey Mercer, Architect, Common Services Agency, National Health Service, Scotland.
- Robert George Miles, Senior Museum Assistant, Science Museum.
- Winifred Florence Milsom, Audio Typist, Board of Customs & Excise.
- Thomas Hugh Minnis, Regional Official, General & Municipal Workers Union, Northern Ireland.
- Stanley Edward Mole, Stores Supervisory Officer, Grade A, Metropolitan Police Office.
- Samuel Collier Moore, Assistant Chief Officer, Fire Authority for Northern Ireland.
- Brindley Richard Morgan, Clerical Officer, Welsh Office.
- Kenneth Richard Morley, Editorial Consultant, Beckett Newspapers Ltd.
- Edith Mary Morris, lately Nursing Officer, Forest Hospital, Nottingham Area Health Authority.
- Charles Francis Moxon, Intelligence Officer III, Ministry of Defence.
- Barbara Moyle, Secretary to the Director, Glass Manufacturers' Federation.
- John Graham Munro, Member, Highland Health Board.
- Leonard Musgrove, Senior Executive Officer, Department of Employment.
- John Albert Nettleton, Director, Brockhole National Park Centre, Lake District National Park.
- Hugh Edward Newton, Managing Director, McCarthy E. Fitt Ltd.
- Helen Margaret Nicholson, Training Officer, Northumberland, Tyne and Wear Branch, British Red Cross Society.
- Rose Nicholson. For services to the community in Wrexham.
- Charles Henry Noble, Captain of Ocean Going Tugs.
- Eva Noble, lately Head Teacher, Royal National Orthopaedic Hospital School, Stanmore.
- Cyril James North, Senior Scientific Officer, East Mailing Research Station, Agricultural Research Council.
- Gwendoline Alice Nunn, lately Headmistress, The Rodings Central Primary School, Essex.
- Christina Smellie Baird Orr, Ward Sister, Western General Hospital, Edinburgh.
- John Osborn. For services to Yachting.
- Michael John O'Shea, Assistant Works Manager (Development), British Aircraft Corporation Ltd, Warton.
- Mary Emily Oughtred, General Secretary, Association for Spina Bifida and Hydrocephalus.
- Frederick Charles Padley, Member, Joint Committee for Tutorial Classes, University of Reading.
- The Reverend Canon Peter Ellice Paine, Member, Boston Borough Council.
- Terence Lionel Paine, Player Coach, Hereford United Football Club.
- Jennie Mary Patterson, Secretary, Royal Society of Literature.
- Olive Constance Paynton, lately Head of Links Section, Exchanges Department, British Council.
- Philip Edward Pearce, Service Manager, Olympus 593, Rolls-Royce (1971) Ltd.
- Joyce Margaret Mary Penney, Clerical Officer, Board of Customs & Excise.
- Robert Ernest Percy, Senior Executive Officer, Department of Employment.
- John Tyssil Phillips, Higher Executive Officer, Department of Health & Social Security.
- Patricia Sybil Phillips, Woman Observer Officer, Norwich, Royal Observer Corps.
- Winifred Mary Phillips. For services to the community in Sale, Cheshire.
- William Harry Pinfold, lately Chief Superintendent, Devon & Cornwall Constabulary.
- James Edward Preston, Deputy Principal, Department of Health & Social Services, Northern Ireland.
- Frederick Jason Edward Price, Manager, Aircraft Production, British Aircraft Corporation Ltd.
- John Keech Prior, Training Manager, Prudential Assurance Co. Ltd.
- Llewellyn Pritchard, Headmaster, Ninelands Lane Junior School, Garforth, Leeds.
- Mary Elisabeth de Beau Purves, Deputy Manager, The Design Centre, Design Council.
- Winifred Rabbitt, lately Women's Welfare Officer, Tag Construction Materials Company.
- Jean Paton Ralston, Vice-Chairman, Wigtown District Savings Committee.
- William Samuel Rathbone. For services to local government in the St. Asaph area, Clwyd.
- Arthur George Reid, General Medical Practitioner, Auchterarder, Perthshire.
- David Reid, Director of Consumer Protection, Fife Regional Council.
- Muriel Reid, Clerical Officer, Department of Energy.
- Lily Riley, Matron, Church Army Home for the Aged, Lowestoft.
- Derek John Rivers, Commercial Administration Manager, Metal Box Ltd.
- Clovis Maidston Roach, Member, North West Conciliation Committee, Race Relations Board.
- Cecil Percy Roberts, Senior Youth Officer, York, North Yorkshire Education Authority.
- Owen Roberts, Chairman, Civilian Committee, No. 2387 Pudsey Squadron, Air Training Corps.
- Dorothy Gertrude Robins, lately Assistant Director of Nurse Education, Barking/Havering Area.
- Donald Kinsey Robinson, Chairman, Yorkshire & Humberside Regional Educational Savings Committee.
- Isaac Robinson. For services to Association Football.
- Evelyn Mary Robson, The Hospitality Secretary, The English-Speaking Union of the Commonwealth.
- William James Boustead Robson, Veterinary Surgeon, Laurencekirk, Kincardineshire.
- Harry Clifford Rogers, General Manager (Deputy), Trustee Savings Bank of Mid-Lancashire & Merseyside.
- Johanna Flett Rosie, Theatre and Outpatient Department Sister, Balfour Hospital, Kirkwall.
- Violet Evelyn Rounding, lately Executive Officer, Department of Energy.
- James Rourke. For services to youth in Formby.
- William John Owen Rowbotham (Bill Owen), Chairman, Performing Arts Advisory Panel, National Association of Boys' Clubs.
- William Frederick Rowland, Higher Executive Officer, Department of Employment.
- Eileen Nellie Rowlands, Company Secretary, William Smith & Son (Neptune Works) Ltd, Redditch.
- Albert Thomas Rowley, Lecturer Grade II, Harper Adams Agricultural College, Newport, Salop.
- William Sadlier, BEM, Secretary, Submarine Old Comrades' Association.
- Ralph Sallon, Caricaturist, Daily Mirror.
- George William Sands (Died), lately Sports Reporter, Middlesex Chronicle.
- Arthur Sayer, Group Construction Manager, Vosper Thorneycroft Ltd.
- Muriel Cecilia Scholes, lately Senior Scientific Officer, Clinical Laboratories, Manchester Royal Infirmary.
- Harry Ernest Scruby, TD, Executive Assistant, London Transport.
- Frederick Harold Shapland, Member, Devon County Council.
- Kay Simpson (Kathleen Smart), Conductor, Belfast Girl Singers.
- Major Vivian Rene Broadway Smallwood, TD, lately Director, British Export Houses Association. For services to Export.
- Richard Charles Smith, Secretary, Eastern Gas Consumers' Council.
- John Francis Smyth, Divisional Officer (Grade II), Fire Authority for Northern Ireland.
- Edward Thomas Ford Spence, Chairman, Argyll & Bute District Council.
- Enid Muriel Spencer, Librarian, British Dental Association.
- Mary Florence (Molly) Spooner. For services to the study of marine pollution hazards.
- David Colin Starbrook. For services to Judo.
- William Norman Staynes, Assistant to the Managing Director, Redifon Flight Simulation Ltd., Wandsworth. For services to Export.
- Fred Stephenson, Farmer, County Durham. For services to agriculture.
- Cecilia Stobbart, Executive Officer, Ministry of Defence.
- Elsie Mary Stockton, Secretary, Mildmay Mission Hospital, London.
- Donald John Sutherland, Assessor, Crofters Commission, Applecross area, Ross-shire.
- Kenneth George Scammell Sutton, lately Social Secretary, Wembley Stadium Ltd.
- Jean Aitken-Swan, lately Chief Research Officer, Sociology Unit, Medical Research Council.
- Ernest Charles Sweby, Secretary, The National School Brass Band Association.
- Laurence Francis Tate, lately Senior Accountant, Ministry of Defence.
- Alfred Tayler, lately Director, British Textile Machinery Association. For services to Export.
- Gordon Austin Taylor, Managing Director, Austin Taylor Electrical Ltd.
- Rita June Taylor, Sales Director, Britains Ltd. For services to Export.
- Leonard Thomas, Tax Officer Higher Grade, Board of Inland Revenue.
- Elizabeth Wedgwood Thompson, Senior Superintendent Physiotherapist, Royal Victoria Hospital, Belfast.
- Frederick Smith Thompson, Organiser, Citizens' Advice Bureau, Cheltenham.
- Arnold Forster Thorne, lately Director, World Wildlife Fund British National Appeal.
- Douglas Peter Thorne, Chief Development Engineer, Supersonic Projects, British Aircraft Corporation Ltd.
- Frederick John Titmus. For services to Cricket.
- Maud Joyce Trinder, Deputy Head, Saffron Walden County High School.
- Harry Turner. For services to the community in Shenfield.
- Leonard George Turner, Secretary, The Royal National Rose Society.
- George Tuson, Assistant Regional Engineer, Wessex Regional Health Authority.
- John Venn, Deputy Chief Designer, Naval Weapons Division, Hawker Siddeley Dynamics Ltd.
- Major John Charles Vincent, lately Tax Officer Higher Grade, Board of Inland Revenue.
- Philip Wade, Librarian, Royal Society of Medicine.
- Florence Annie Walker, Secretary, Office of the Methodist Church Forces Centres, London.
- Eileen Mary Walsh, lately Night Superintendent, Llandough Hospital, near Cardiff.
- Elsie Kathleen Muriel Ward. For services to mentally disabled people in Northampton.
- David Muir Wardley, DL, Chairman, Clyde River Purification Board.
- Jesse John Waterman, Member, National Executive Committee, National Union of Agricultural and Allied Workers.
- Hannah Ivy Webb, Nursing Officer, Shabden Park Hospital, Chipstead.
- Margery Elisabeth Weekes. For services to local government and the community in Havant and district.
- Kenneth Ernest Welch, Higher Executive Officer, Science Research Council.
- Major Arthur Charles Wells, lately Senior Executive Officer, Department of Employment.
- Major Roger James Ratcliffe Whistler, (Retd.), Retd. Officer III, Ministry of Defence.
- Reginald James White. For services to Yachting.
- Vivian Augustus Alexander Anthony White, Youth and Community Organiser, South Glamorgan Education Authority.
- Alfred George Williams, Vice-Chairman, Wiltshire County Savings Committee.
- Moses Oliver Williams, Chairman, Tafarnaubach and Princetown Branch, Miners' Welfare Association.
- Muriel Williams. For services to the community in Nantymoel and district.
- Richard Edward Williams. For services to music in Tonyrefail.
- Reginald Parry Willson, Senior Assistant, Conwy and Llandudno and Nant and Conwy Petty Session Divisions.
- John Wilson, Chief Superintendent, Metropolitan Police.
- Robert Wilson, Chief Superintendent, Royal Ulster Constabulary.
- Gilbert Wood, Chief Chemist, Wimet Ltd, Wolverhampton.
- Henry Edmund Wood, lately Assistant Director, Department of Legal & Administrative Services, Cumbria County Council.
- Frederick William Woodall, Chairman, Richmondshire District Council.
- John Laughton Woodliffe, Senior Executive Officer, Department of Health & Social Security.
- Charles Garfield Woodruff, Senior Executive Officer, Ministry of Defence.
- Edna Agnes Woods, County Organiser, Bedfordshire, Women's Royal Voluntary Service.
- John Harrison Woodward, Chairman, T. E. Woodward Road Haulage Company, Accrington.
- Kathleen Wooldridge, Higher Executive Officer, Department of Health & Social Security.
- George Henry Wright, Regional Secretary (Wales), Transport & General Workers' Union, Cardiff.
- John Wake Wright, Chairman and Managing Director, Barrhead Kid Co. Ltd. For services to Export.
- Cyril Wrigley, Postal Executive A, Manchester Head Post Office, North Western Postal Region, Post Office.
- Reginald Herbert Yarrow, Member, Lewes District Council.

Diplomatic Service and Overseas List

- Mariam Jane Ali. For nursing and welfare services to children in Singapore.
- Raymond Anderson, lately Second Secretary and Vice-Consul, HM Embassy, Beirut.
- Daisy Victoria Armstrong. For welfare services to the community in Southern India.
- George Anthony Astaphan. For public services in Dominica.
- William Neville Atwood, Deputy Collector of Customs, Bermuda.
- Bernard Roosevelt Avilez. For public and community services in Belize.
- William de Baudelot Pierroff Batty-Smith. For services to the British community in Lebanon.
- Gerard Wentworth Bean. For services to sport and the community of Bermuda.
- George Lewis Bellot, JP. For public services in St. Kitts-Nevis-Anguilla.
- Alfred Trevor Bevan, QPM, lately Technical Assistance Adviser, Yemen Arab Republic.
- Charles Victor Emmanuel Bousquet, Chief Marine Pilot, Port Authority, St. Lucia.
- George Alfred Bundock, lately Head of Registry, British High Commission, New Delhi.
- Jack Campbell. For public services in the Solomon Islands.
- Aileen Mary Carne, Private Secretary to the Governor and Commander-in-Chief, Bermuda.
- Carlyle Leslie Carvallo, Information Assistant, HM Embassy, Kabul.
- Jean Robertson Cassels. For educational and welfare services to the blind in Hong Kong.
- Winnie Chan. For services to the community in Hong Kong.
- Robert Kohan Cheng, Assistant Government Printer, Printing Department, Hong Kong.
- Raymond Clarke. For services to British marine interests and the British community in Kuwait.
- Sylvia Joan Coker, lately Visa Examiner, HM Embassy, Beirut.
- Edward Cooper, Honorary British Vice-Consul, Concepción, Chile.
- David William Cornelius, Project Manager, Ministry of Agriculture, Malawi.
- Sister Dympna Crowley. For services to education and the community in Gibraltar.
- Alec Gordon Currah. For services to education in developing countries in Africa.
- Walter Curry, lately Assistant Representative, British Council, Thailand.
- Ian Ivor Daley, MVO, lately Archivist, Office of the Vice-President, European Commission, Brussels.
- Mabel Lilian Fielding Dent. For services to the British community in Argentina.
- Marion Manvers Deschamps. For welfare services to the British community in Paris.
- Frederick Dixon. For services to the community in Tarawa, Gilbert Islands.
- Josephine Dungdung, Matron, British High Commission Hospital, New Delhi.
- Daniel Rodolph Valentine Edwards. For public and community services in Montserrat.
- Jacqueline Cecil Elmore-Hammond, Information Assistant, HM Embassy, Paris.
- Katherine Jayne Ephgrave. For services to the British community in Saudi Arabia.
- Richard Whittington Fahie, Executive Officer, Public Works Department, Anguilla.
- Derek Fernyhough, lately Second Secretary and Consul, HM Embassy, Santiago.
- Robina Anita French. For nursing and welfare services to the British community in Buenos Aires.
- Laureano Garcia. For services to sport in Gibraltar.
- Peter Godwin. For welfare services to seamen in Buenos Aires.
- Christine Alys Gordon-Smith. For services to the community in Malawi.
- John Wood Green, Principal, Collector of Customs & Excise, Solomon Islands.
- Laurence Aelred Harris. For services to British commercial interests and the British community in Belgium.
- Squadron Leader Denis Alfred Harrison. For services to British ex-servicemen and the British community in the South of France.
- Leonard Schofield Harrop. For services to the British community in Japan.
- Alexander Hayle Hazell, Chief Executive Officer, Lands Department, Malawi.
- Patricia Hewitt. For nursing services to the community in the New Hebrides Condominium.
- William Charles Hind, Commercial Officer HM Embassy, Algiers.
- John Lewis Hobbs, Assistant Commissioner of Police, Belize.
- Victoria Gudrun Dawne Hamilton Holliday. For services to the British community in Switzerland.
- Margaret Holmes, Personal Secretary, BAOR Moenchen Gladbach.
- Dorothy Joan Hopkins, Private Secretary to HM Ambassador, Paris.
- Isabel Jardine. For public and community services in Bermuda.
- Robert Frederick Kenneth Jones, ED. For services to the community in Hong Kong.
- Richard Leo Keating, Honorary British Consul, Santa Cruz de Tenerife, Canary Islands.
- Patricia Mary Kelly, First Secretary (Information), Hm Embassy, The Hague.
- Wilfred Benjamin Kiriau, CPM, Deputy Commissioner of Police, Solomon Islands.
- Tupua Leupena, Administrative Officer, Chief Minister's Office, Tuvalu.
- Thomas Francis Linn, Attache HM Embassy, Beirut.
- John Yock Hon Lum. For services to the community in the New Hebrides Condominium.
- Brendan Joseph McDowell, Second Secretary (Commercial), HM Embassy, Amman.
- Alisin Louise Manington-MacDougall. For services to British commercial interests in Spain.
- Peter Manning-Smith, HM Consul (Commercial), British Consulate-General, Philadelphia.
- Olive Hilda Miller. For services to the community in the Cayman Islands.
- Hilda Muriel Oddie (Sister Phillipa OHP). For nursing and welfare services to the community in Ghana.
- Anthony Olivera. Foreman of Waterworks, City Engineers Department, Gibraltar.
- Jack Barry Orr. For services to British commercial interests in Mexico.
- Leona Marie Panton. For services to education and the community in Belize.
- Susan Peel, For welfare services to the community in developing countries in Africa.
- Ernest Cyril Preston. For services to Anglo-Moroccan relations.
- Arthur Victor Pugh, lately Financial Adviser, Government of Kenya.
- Vida Elsie Radbourne, Personnel Officer, British High Commission, Ottawa.
- Reginald Gordon Roche Rowland. For services to the British community in Argentina.
- Geoffrey Francis Anthony Sadler. For services to the British community in Japan.
- Use Schwarz. For services to the community in Malawi.
- Fai Sham, Senior Assistant Registrar, Registrars Department, Hong Kong.
- The Reverend John Charles William Sinton. For welfare services to seamen in Port of Spain.
- Sheriff Alderman Sutherland. For public and community services in St. Vincent.
- Jack Lionel Percy Verley. For services to education and the British community in Uganda.
- Leslie William Voaden, Assistant Trade Commissioner, British Consulate-General, Vancouver.
- Leopold Waight, District Officer, Government of Belize.
- David Harry Whitbread, lately Archivist, HM Embassy, Beirut.
- William Reynold Kepple White, Manager, Government Broadcasting Station, Montserrat.
- Joan Margaret Wilson, Personal Secretary, HM Embassy, Lima.
- Samuel Wilson. For services to the British community in New York.
- The Reverend John Christopher Wigglesworth. For services to the community in Bombay.
- Robert Ballantyne Wyper, lately Administration Officer, British High Commission, Kampala.

Australian States

State of New South Wales

- William Walter Bowrey. For services to sport.
- Elennor May Boxsell (Sister Boxsell). For services to nursing and the community.
- William Charlton Brown. For services to the community.
- Robert Stephen Connell. For services to civil defence.
- Maxwell John Deller. For services to the community.
- Joseph Chaika Doueihi. For services to the community.
- William Francis Fitzgerald. For services to charity.
- Alderman Eva Mavis Franks, BEM. For services to local government and the community.
- Madge Enid Gibson. For services to charity.
- Matron Mary Veronica Henlen. For services to nursing.
- Athol George Hill. For services to local government.
- Alderman Augustine Darrell Crosby Jackson. For services to local government and the community.
- Robert John McCarthy. For services to sport.
- Amy Gazell Meehan. For services to local government.
- Stella Marion Moloney. For services to the community.
- Stanley Darrell Mulliner. For services to ex-servicemen.
- Alderman Frank John Pangallo. For services to local government and the community.
- Lawrence Gordon Peterson (Lieutenant-Colonel, Salvation Army). For services to the community.
- Phylis Rosina Raisbeck. For services to music.
- James Miltiadis Samios. For services to the community.

State of Victoria

- Councillor Gerald Laurence Basterfield, of Moorabbin. For municipal and community services.
- Glyn de Villiers Bosisto, of Glen Iris. For services to sport, and the community.
- Joseph Clarence Bull, JP, of Metung. For services to the community.
- Keith Leslie Chm Ers, of Brighton Beach. For services to medicine.
- Raymond Thomas Paul Chapman, of Safety Beach. For services to the community.
- Councillor John Alan Chisholm, of Wendouree. For municipal and community services.
- Donald Cockram, of Templestowe. For services to the building industry and community.
- Hans Irvine Ebeling, of East Bentleigh. For services to sport.
- John William Sydney Fraser, JP, of Moonee Ponds. For services to the community.
- Rex Hume Hollioake, of Ballarat. For municipal and community services.
- Philip Edward Irving, of Warrandyte. For services to automotive engineering.
- John Stewart Legge, of Kooyong. For services to journalism and the community.
- Colin MacDonald, of Aspendale. For services to transport and tourism.
- Nancy Fannie Millis, of Elwood, For services to biological sciences and education.
- Acheson Best Overend, of Brighton. For services to architecture.
- Jack Melville Curran Philpott, of North Balwyn. For services to community health.
- George Van Nooten, of Yarrawonga. For services to community health.
- Peter Venn, of Bunvood. For services to the Returned Services League.

State of Queensland

- Kathleen Sarah Boyd, of Kenmore. For services to child welfare.
- Hannah Patricia Drexl, of Highleigh. For services to the community.
- Charles Stewart Elliot, of Boonah. For services to primary industry.
- Frederick Harley Hillier, of Manly. For services to the Returned Services League of Australia and community.
- Catherine Jessie Keates, of Wondai. For services to the community.
- William James Morgan, of Cairns. For services to the timber industry and the community.
- Marjorie Kathleen Phillips, of Paddington. For services to nursing.
- Councillor Eric Charles Powne, of Bollon. For services to the community and local government.
- William Alexander Raff, of Karara. For services to primary industry and local government.
- Sidney Edward Reilly, of Corinda. For services in the field of surveying.
- Leslie Charles Stewart, of Cherbourg. For services to the Aboriginal community.
- Harry Stolzenberg, of Kingaroy. For services to primary industry.

State of Western Australia

- Thomas John Bowen, of Kalgoorlie. For services to the RSPCA and community.
- Lilian Maude Callow, of Busseltoa. For services to conservation.
- Alice Carrard (Madame Alice Carrard), of Claremont. For services to music.
- Eileen Dawson, of Como. For services to golf.
- Clee Francis Howard Jenkins, of Claremont. For services in the field of natural history.
- Ronald Barrington Knight, of Yarloop. For services to medicine and the community.

=== Companion of the Imperial Service Order (ISO) ===
Home Civil Service

- William John Adams, Principal, Department of Director of Public Prosecutions.
- Ronald George Bigmore, Senior Principal, Board of Inland Revenue.
- Stanley Henshaw Booth, lately Assistant Director, Royal Ordnance Factory, Leeds, Ministry of Defence.
- John Douglas Burnell, lately Superintending Estate Surveyor, Department of the Environment.
- Margaret Ada Clark, Principal, Department of Industry.
- John George Colin Hopkins, Principal Collector, Board of Inland Revenue.
- Helen Barr Jack, MBE, lately Principal, Ministry of Defence.
- Ronald Frank Liggins, lately Senior Principal, Royal Mint.
- David McCluskey, Senior Principal, Board of Inland Revenue.
- Peggy Mabel Wilhelmina Morecombe, lately HM Inspector of Schools, Department of Education & Science.
- Kathleen Elizabeth Nicholl, Principal, Civil Service Department for Northern Ireland.
- Herbert William Pawsey, MBE, lately Principal, Ministry of Defence.
- Ralph Frank Peasey, Principal Scientific Officer, Department of Employment.
- Leonard George Perry, MBE, Principal, Department of Prices & Consumer Protection.
- Percival George Perry, Principal, Department of Health & Social Security.
- Harold George Poore, Senior Principal, Department of the Environment.
- George Hay Robertson, Deputy Principal Clerk of Session, Court of Session, Edinburgh.
- Jack Norman Slinn, Principal, Department of Transport.
- Brinley Charles Smith, MBE, Principal, Department for National Savings.
- Oriel Doreen Spraggon, Principal, Department of Health & Social Security.
- James Douglas Frankland Turnham, lately Principal, Home Office.
- Peter Ward, lately Senior Principal Scientific Officer, Ministry of Defence.
- Lancelot Mosley Waud, lately Regional Socio-Economic Adviser, Ministry of Agriculture, Fisheries & Food.
- John Noel White, Deputy Collector, Board of Customs & Excise.
- Israel Sydney Zetter, Foreign & Commonwealth Office.

Diplomatic Service and Overseas List

- Tom Ecob, Deputy Commissioner of Prisons, Hong Kong.
- John Linthwaite, Administrative Officer, Staff Grade, Hong Kong.
- Frank Odel Mason, Superintendent of Prisons, St. Vincent.
- Balwant Singh, Superintendent of Prisons, Hong Kong.

Australian States

State of New South Wales

- Francis John Owen Ryan, Commissioner for Corporate Affairs.

State of Victoria

- Percy William Merrett, of Regent. Formerly Secretary, Department of State Development & Decentralization.
- Allan Day Pead, of Doncaster. Formerly President, Industrial Training Commission, Department of Labour & Industry.

State of Queensland

- Frank Malcolm Learmonth, Commissioner of Irrigation & Water Supply.

State of Western Australia

- John Ronaldson Ewing, JP, Commissioner of State Taxation.

=== Order of the Companions of Honour (CH) ===
- The Right Honourable Cledwyn Hughes, MP. For public service in Wales.

=== British Empire Medal (BEM) ===
Military Division

Royal Navy

- Radio Electrical Artificer 1 John William Allsop, D076832K.
- Chief Petty Officer Stores Accountant Ronald John Allsworth, M909545L.
- Leading Aircrewman John Arthur Balls, D10S972F.
- Ordnance Electrical Mechanician (O)1 (SM) Charles James Bowen, M911116R.
- Sergeant Harold Briggs, Royal Marines, P019798C.
- Petty Officer (S)(SM) John James Colling, D054482S.
- Chief Radio Electrician (A) John Anthony Copley, D055757W.
- Chief Marine Engineering Mechanic William John Crews, K084195A.
- Chief Marine Engineering Mechanic Lawrence William Dalton, D128152X.
- Chief Petty Officer Steward David John Dewey, L930379E.
- Chief Petty Officer (OPS)(M) Patrick Doherty, J833228Y.
- Marine Malcolm Richard Speight Edmondson, Royal Marines, P016340C.
- Acting Chief Petty Officer Airman (PHOT 1) Michael Edward Gilbert, D069248C.
- Chief Petty Officer (SEA) Frederick William Hannaford, J419140V.
- Chief Petty Officer Richard Joseph Holden, X996752, Royal Naval Reserve.
- Petty Officer Stores Accountant Robin Anthony Holmes, M981746X.
- Petty Officer Marine Engineering Mechanic Ip Shu Sang, 01782.
- Colour Sergeant Edward John Kelland, Royal Marines, P019510V.
- Chief Marine Engineering Mechanic (CA) Richard John Kinsella, K645995Q.
- Chief Marine Engineering Mechanician (P) Ian Maclachlan Midleton, K970634T.
- Chief Radio Supervisor (S) David Owen, DOS8336F.
- Petty Officer (S) Alan Parkin-Beresford, J889436R.
- Acting Chief Petty Officer (OPS)(S)(SM) Roger Edward Pescodd, D0721S4U.
- Chief Petty Officer (OPS)(S)(SM) Brian Terance SAVAGE, J921546T.
- Colour Sergeant Brian Cecil John Skinley, Royal Marines, P017242L.
- Chief Radio Supervisor Frederick George Sylvester, N999388, Royal Naval Reserve.
- Chief Radio Supervisor David Brian Taylor, J9420S5N.
- Marine Engineering Mechanician 1(P) Robert Donald Williams, K903361F.

Bar to the British Empire Medal

- Chief Electrician (A) Joseph Roy Mullender, BEM, D154127L.

Army

- 23211667 Staff Sergeant (Local Warrant Officer Class 2) Malcolm John Allen, Special Air Service Regiment.
- 23667523 Sergeant Keith Linden Frederick Beale, Royal Army Pay Corps.
- 23747373 Sergeant Brian William Breach, The Queen's Regiment.
- 23947074 Sergeant Allan George Brookes, Royal Army Ordnance Corps.
- 23546836 Sergeant Stephen James Callan, Special Air Service Regiment.
- 21155320 Staff Sergeant Chandrabahadur Gurung, Gurkha Engineers.
- 23983030 Staff Sergeant Gordon Richard Coombs, Royal Army Ordnance Corps.
- 23224741 Sergeant John Robin Cooney, The Parachute Regiment (now Discharged).
- 23870876 Staff Sergeant Anthony James Crease, The Royal Scots Dragoon Guards (Carabiniers and Greys).
- 23894966 Sergeant Edward William Crosby, Intelligence Corps.
- 23664934 Sergeant Thomas John Devonald, Royal Tank Regiment (now Discharged).
- 23492216 Corporal Elwyn Gordon Dew, Corps of Royal Engineers.
- 23972770 Staff Sergeant John Thomas Doran, The Queen's Regiment.
- 23773153 Staff Sergeant Michael James Gordon Elsey, Royal Army Ordnance Corps.
- W/306367 Private (Acting Sergeant) Eileen Eveleigh, Women's Royal Army Corps.
- 23473058 Staff Sergeant (Acting Warrant Officer Class 2) Robin Fortune, Royal Corps of Signals.
- 23820831 Staff Sergeant John William Groves, Royal Corps of Signals.
- 21142996 Staff Sergeant Guptabahadur Thapa, 2nd King Edward VII's Own Gurkha Rifles (The Sirmoor Rifles).
- 24338301 Corporal George Anthony Hall, Intelligence Corps.
- 23222232 Staff Sergeant Michael George Edwin Hobday, The Royal Hussars (Prince of Wales's Own).
- 22049720 Staff Sergeant Arthur Iles, The Royal Green Jackets.
- 23369449 Staff Sergeant Ronald Hendry Johnston, Royal Corps of Transport.
- 24007385 Sergeant Royston Felix Nicholas Keightley, Royal Army Ordnance Corps.
- W/50802 Private (Acting Sergeant) Jeanne Norah Hewes Kick, Women's Royal Army Corps.
- 23824513 Trooper (Acting Sergeant) Michael Lane, Royal Regiment of Artillery, attached Special Air Service Regiment.
- 22288147 Staff Sergeant (Local Warrant Officer Class 1) Raymond Arthur Leadbeater, The Worcestershire and Sherwood Foresters Regiment (29th/45th Foot) (now Discharged).
- 22789248 Staff Sergeant John Lester, Royal Pioneer Corps.
- 22967774 Staff Sergeant Norman Joseph Longstaff, Corps of Royal Electrical & Mechanical Engineers.
- 23938455 Sergeant Edward Alan Lowe, Corps of Royal Engineers.
- 22644566 Bombardier (Acting Sergeant) James Mackay, Royal Regiment of Artillery.
- 24010585 Sergeant Gary John Mason, Royal Corps of Signals.
- 23281948 Sergeant Denis Brian Miller, Royal Corps of Transport.
- 24079659 Sergeant (Acting Staff Sergeant) Eamon O'Higgins, Royal Corps of Transport.
- 23944802 Sergeant Dennis Poulton, Corps of Royal Military Police.
- 23069311 Staff Sergeant Alexander Rafferty, Royal Army Ordnance Corps.
- 23664245 Staff Sergeant (Acting Warrant Officer Class 2) Michael Louis Ramsay, Corps of Royal Engineers.
- 23664568 Staff Sergeant Gerald Robinson, The Queen's Regiment.
- 23241079 Sergeant James Alfred Robinson, Royal Army Ordnance Corps.
- 23205325 Sergeant George Albert Scott, The Royal Irish Rangers (27th (Inniskilling) 83rd & 87th), Territorial & Army Volunteer Reserve.
- 23965259 Trooper (Acting Sergeant) John Henry Stokes, The Royal Green Jackets, attached Special Air Service Regiment.
- 23208447 Staff Sergeant Thomas George Upham, Royal Corps of Transport, Territorial & Army Volunteer Reserve.
- 23911849 Sergeant William Venus, Royal Corps of Signals.
- 24278226 Lance Corporal Colin Williams, Corps of Royal Engineers.
- 24025362 Sergeant John Robertson Worrall, Royal Army Ordnance Corps.
- 22817935 Staff Sergeant (Acting Warrant Officer Class 2) Jack James Wragg, Coldstream Guards (now Discharged).

Royal Air Force

- Acting Warrant Officer Keith Edward Watts (J2559499).
- E0571199 Flight Sergeant Gordon Frank Brown.
- K1925638 Flight Sergeant Rowland Hall.
- D1923658 Flight Sergeant Denis Kiernan.
- E1925731 Flight Sergeant Henry Francis Morriss.
- R3523967 Flight Sergeant Dennis Gerald Roberts, RAF Regiment.
- X4186863 Flight Sergeant Harold Stead.
- F3514590 Flight Sergeant Peter Thomas Walter.
- C2759978 Acting Flight Sergeant Charles David Armitage.
- Q4244712 Acting Flight Sergeant Malcolm Harold McBay.
- G0593312 Acting Flight Sergeant Michael Phillip Parrish.
- X4069076 Acting Flight Sergeant Philip Henry Pring.
- PI930761 Acting Flight Sergeant Raymond Derrick Sefton.
- J4195514 Chief Technician Peter Frederick Barlow.
- L1925737 Chief Technician Alan George Croxford.
- E1928337 Chief Technician Jeffrey Garth Newman.
- BOS88205 Chief Technician Robin Michael Packham Royal Air Force.
- U1932804 Chief Technician Malcolm Rigby.
- V1935087 Chief Technician Peter Victor Shepherd.
- N4013561 Chief Technician John. Noel Willis.
- E1930309 Sergeant Anthony Gwavas Elgie.
- Q4114833 Sergeant Martin Paul Hair.
- M2804316 Sergeant Elizabeth May Ricks, Women's Royal Air Force.
- Q1948123 Sergeant Dennis Roy Thompson.
- B3515836 Sergeant Kenneth Frederick Winterbottom.
- S4274050 Acting Sergeant Philip Michael Campbell Holland.
- X4254222 Acting Sergeant Jack Oliva Ormiston.
- L8086468 Corporal Richard Cassell.
- Y4292253 Corporal Roy Michael Lumley.

Civil Division
United Kingdom

- Thomas Alderson, Leading Chargehand, British Library.
- Archibald Wilson Alexander, Specialist Tube Inspector, Tubes Division, Corby, British Steel Corporation.
- Harry Anndars, Dredgerman (Deckhand), Hull Docks, British Transport Docks Board.
- Jessie Murray Archer, National Savings Group Collector, Aberdeen.
- Frederick Albert Arnold, Divisional Commandant, West Midlands Special Constabulary.
- Leonard James Attrill, Professional and Technology Officer IV, HM Dockyard, Portsmouth, Ministry of Defence.
- George Edward Avery, Head Herdsman, C. E. B. Draper & Son, Ltd, Shrewsbury.
- Florence Ayre, Sub-Postmistress, Old Somerby, Grantham, Lincolnshire, North Eastern Postal Region, Post Office.
- Elizabeth Selina Baker, Member, Colwyn Bay, North Wales, Women's Royal Voluntary Service.
- Frederick Baker, Head Gardener 1st Class, North West Europe Area, Commonwealth War Graves Commission.
- Hubert George Ball, Sub-Officer, Gwent Fire Brigade.
- John Forsyth Barclay, Chief Permanent Way Inspector, Glasgow, British Railways Board.
- Beatrice Jane Barham lately Chief Paperkeeper, Patent Office.
- Leslie John Barker, Area Manager, London Transport.
- May Barker, National Savings Group Collector, Seaham, Co. Durham.
- John Harrison Barnes, Senior Civil Foreman, Port of Tyne Authority.
- Jean Barnett, Leader, Garrison Youth Club, Dortmund, West Germany.
- Gertrude Barratt, National Savings Group Collector, Warley, West Midlands.
- Albert Barrow, lately Professional and Technology Officer III, British Sector, Berlin, Ministry of Defence.
- Leslie Alfred John Barter, Motorman, London Transport.
- Bernard Arthur Beech, Chief Officer Grade I, Prison Department Inspectorate, Home Office.
- Jean Agnes Bell, Station Catering Manageress, York, British Railways Board.
- John William Lewis Beveridge, Foreman, Meter Readers and Meter Reader Collectors, Southern Electricity Board.
- Ben Birchall, Deputy, Allerton Bywater Colliery, North Yorkshire Area, National Coal Board.
- John Alexander Bovill, Head Gardener, English Industrial Estates Corporation, Team Valley, Gateshead.
- Lily May Bowles, School Crossing Patrol, Metropolitan Police.
- Elizabeth Brown. For services to the elderly in Fairwater, Cardiff.
- Minnie May Brown, Inspector Grade I, Reynolds Tube Co. Ltd, Birmingham.
- Robert Brown, Rigger, Gartcosh Works, Scottish Division, British Steel Corporation.
- Joseph Edward Burton, Training Supervisor, Garringtons Ltd.
- William Alfred Herbert Burton, Farm Foreman, Rothamsted Experimental Station, Harpenden, Hertfordshire.
- Robert William Cairns, Member, Corps of Commissionaires (Northern Ireland).
- Alexander Campbell, Gamekeeper, Armadale Estate, Sutherland, Department of Agriculture & Fisheries for Scotland.
- Margaret Ann Carter, Plant Pathologist Grade B, Ministry of Agriculture, Fisheries & Food.
- Joseph Anthony Cassinelli, Out-patient Porter, West London Hospital.
- James Edward (Edward Alexander) Caswell, Senior Paperkeeper, Department of Industry.
- George Harold Christian, Despatch Rider, Department of Finance, Northern Ireland.
- William Wilkinson Closs, Foreman, General Services Coatbridge District, South of Scotland Electricity Board.
- Frederick Cole, National Savings Group Collector, Exeter, Devonshire.
- Donald Thomas Colebrook, Chargehand Maintenance Electrician, Brooke Marine Ltd, Lowestoft.
- Rose-Marie Colin, Office Keeper Grade III, Scottish Office.
- Sidney Joseph Collett, Instructional Officer Grade III, Waddon Skill Centre, Department of Employment.
- Frederick Forsyth Conner, Sergeant, Lothian & Borders Police.
- Eveline Connison, lately Weaving Supervisor, Tootals Ltd, Bolton.
- Desmond Patrick Conroy, Sergeant, Royal Ulster Constabulary.
- Raymond William Frederick Corrin, Regimental Quartermaster Sergeant, Army Cadet Force, Isle of Man.
- Brian Rowland Preston Couzens, Sub-Officer, Powys Fire Brigade.
- Robert Henry James Culross, Chief Petty Officer, Shell Tankers (UK) Ltd.
- Anne Davies, lately Local Organiser, Wetherby Metropolitan District, Leeds, Women's Royal Voluntary Service.
- Maurice Davies, Foreman Grade 1, Area Garage, South Lancashire Area (Bolton), North Western Electricity Board.
- Cyril Albert Denton, Tool Maker, Electrical & Musical Industries Ltd, Hayes.
- John Devlin, Air Traffic Engineer Grade II, British Airways.
- Robert Crookston Dickson, Assistant Distribution Fitter, Edinburgh West District, Scottish Gas Region, British Gas Corporation.
- Patrick Joseph Dillon, Revenue Assistant, Board of Customs & Excise.
- Kenneth Dinham Gardener I, Royal Naval Engineering College, Manadon, Plymouth, Ministry of Defence.
- David French Dockray, Leader, West End Boys' Club, Newcastle upon Tyne.
- Maurice Doherty, Film Unit Manager, Road Safety, Department of the Environment, Northern Ireland.
- John Jeremy Michael Donoghue, Process and General Supervisory Grade "B", Military Vehicles Research and Development Establishment, Ministry of Defence.
- Mollie Downie. For services to mentally disabled people in Edinburgh.
- John Dowrick, Professional and Technology Officer III, Property Services Agency, Department of the Environment.
- William Frederick Charles Duckling, Gauging Machine Setter, CAV Fuel Injection Equipment Business, Sudbury, Suffolk.
- John Walter Dunmore, Foreman of Works, British Aircraft Corporation Ltd.
- Thomas Eldridge, lately Schoolkeeper, Wandsworth School, London S.W.18.
- Walter Alexander Elliott, Chief Officer Class II, Northern Ireland Prison Service.
- Stanley Ellis, Works Foreman, Pearl Paints Ltd, Treforest.
- William Robert Ely, Constable, Kent County Constabulary.
- Stanley Harold Escott, Steward II, Commando Training Centre, Royal Marines, Lympstone, Exmouth, Ministry of Defence.
- James Herbert Fell, For services to Calderstones Hospital, Whalley, Lancashire.
- George Edward Fisher, Caretaker, Limpsfield Grange School, Limpsfield, Surrey.
- Henry Dacre Forrest, Constable, Lancashire Constabulary.
- James Forrest, lately Sub Officer, Moffat Fire Station.
- Herbert Foster, Underground Repairer, Rockingham Colliery, Barnsley Area, National Coal Board.
- Henry Victor Foxcroft, Experimental Mechanic, Royal Military Academy, Sandhurst, Ministry of Defence.
- Euphemia Fraser, National Savings Group Collector, Aberlady, East Lothian.
- Ethel French, Warden, Kell's Way Old Aged Persons Estate, Rowlands Gill, Tyne & Wear.
- Catherine Furlong, Kitchen Superintendent, Heatherwood Hospital, Ascot, Berkshire.
- Charles Edward Day Galloway, Janitor, Inchview Primary School, Edinburgh.
- Ralph Galloway, Works Superintendent, Mixing and Special Products Department, George Angus & Co. Ltd.
- James Henry Garrard, General Supervisor, Mailing and Despatch Services, Confederation of British Industries.
- Gladys Irene Violet Gash, Supervisor of Cleaners, County Hall, Maidstone, Kent County Council.
- Raymond Sidney Gilbert, Sub-Officer, Dorset Fire Brigade.
- Henry Gilliver, Mayors Attendant, Bolton Metropolitan District Council.
- John Glendinning, Truck Operator I, Belfast Terminal, Esso Petroleum Co. Ltd.
- Albert Arthur Gould, Works Superintendent, Wychavon District Council.
- Donald David Grant, Chargehand Craftsman, Metropolitan Police Office.
- George Arthur Gregory, Professional and Technology Officer Grade IV, Royal Ordnance Factory, Nottingham, Ministry of Defence.
- Ellen May Griffin, Local Organiser, Grantham, Lincolnshire, Women's Royal Voluntary Service.
- May Elizabeth Groves, Seamstress, Westminster Abbey.
- Dorothy Minnie Haas, Assistant Chief Photoprinter, Science Research Council.
- Robert William Hall. For services to land drainage in County Durham.
- Charles James Halsey, Foreman Propagator, Royal Borough of Kensington and Chelsea.
- Francis Harper, lately Senior Driver, Ministry of Defence.
- Bowen William Harris, Sergeant, Metropolitan Police.
- Reginald Jack Harvey. For services to the community in Pickering.
- Robert Leonard Harvey. Clerk of Works, St. Paul's Cathedral.
- William George Hayward, Chargehand Armourer, RAF Chilmark, Salisbury, Ministry of Defence.
- William Jellicoe Hill, Professional and Technology Officer III, Property Services Agency, Department of the Environment.
- Margaret Hastie Hislin, Domestic Assistant, Scottish Health Service School of Catering.
- John Richard Hope, Head Warden, Northumberland National Park.
- Enid Isabel Horsley, Chief Supervisor in Charge, Southport Exchange Switchroom, North Western Telecommunications Region, Post Office.
- Florence Mary Houillebecq, Assistant Cook, Civil Service Department.
- Alfred Frederick Howard, MM, Town Crier, London Borough of Lambeth. For services to Export.
- John Hulin, Service Engineer, North Eastern Region, British Gas Corporation.
- Angus Hutchinson, Sewing Machinist, Remploy Ltd, Dundee.
- John James Hutchinson, Stores Class B, Materials Branch, Reactor Group, Risley, United Kingdom Atomic Energy Authority.
- Dorothy Ida Jackson, Leader, Blind Club, Cheadle, Women's Royal Voluntary Service.
- Eric Leonard Jackson, Building Trades Foreman, West Midlands Region, British Gas Corporation.
- William Henry Albert Jarvis, Chief Papermaker, Reed (UK) Paper & Board Ltd, Empire Mill, Northfleet.
- Lewis Guy Jefferson, Radio Technician, RAF Linton-on-Ouse, Ministry of Defence.
- Gordon Jessop, County Staff Officer Cadets, Humberside, St. John Ambulance Brigade.
- Irwin Cyril Jewell, Sub-Officer, Berkshire Fire Brigade.
- Norman Raymond Kinghan, Foreman Grade I, Parks & Cemeteries Department, Belfast City Council.
- Gerald Edward Kirby, lately Works Overseer Grade III, Her Majesty's Stationery Office.
- William Moore Kirkham Sergeant, Staffordshire Police.
- Leslie Knowles, Constable, South Wales Constabulary.
- William James Kyle, Chargehand (Mechanical & Electrical), Property Services Agency, Department of the Environment.
- John Landon, Cartographic Surveyor Higher Grade, Ordnance Survey.
- Fred Leigh. For services to the community, particularly the elderly in Bury.
- Winifred Louise Lewis, District Organiser, Southall, Women's Royal Voluntary Service.
- Joan Margaret Likeman, Matron, Children's Residential Nursery, Mortimer West End, Berkshire.
- George Edward Ling, Basket Crane Driver, Templeborough Electric Melting Shop, Rotherham Works, Sheffield Division, British Steel Corporation.
- Ivy Agnes Lloyd, Member, Banwell, Avon County, Women's Royal Voluntary Service.
- Lucy Bevan Lloyd, Centre Organiser, Bury St. Edmunds Centre, Suffolk Branch, British Red Cross Society.
- Ethel Margaret Lole, School Caretaker, Limbrick Wood Junior School and Limbrick Infants' School, Coventry.
- Fred Luker, lately Craftsman (Mechanical), Manufacturing and Installation Group, Engineering Design Division, Research Group, Culham Laboratory, United Kingdom Atomic Energy Authority.
- Robert Marcus Lyle, Sergeant, Royal Ulster Constabulary.
- Gertrude Mcagherty, Street Savings Group Collector, Banbridge, Co. Down.
- Nevin Alexander McFarland, Sergeant, Royal Ulster Constabulary.
- Norman George McGrath, Warrant Officer, No. 241 (Wanstead & Woodford) Squadron, Air Training Corps.
- Joseph McGuirk, Deputy, Parkside Colliery, Western Area, National Coal Board.
- Lendrick McMaster, Cleaner, Fort Charlotte, Lerwick, Shetland, Ministry of Defence.
- John Joseph McPhillips, lately Foreman, Sheet Metal Department, Vickers Ltd, Shipbuilding Group, Barrow.
- Alexander Dowie Marr, Constable, Fife Constabulary.
- Bernard Martin, Curator, Central Libraries, City of Birmingham.
- John Martin, Telephone Operator, Royal Ordnance Factory, Birtley, Ministry of Defence.
- Edward May, Boatswain, Port Auxiliary Service, HM Naval Base, Portland, Ministry of Defence.
- Maud Muriel Millar. For voluntary services to St. Francis and Dulwich Hospitals.
- Frances Violet Mitchell, Old People's Welfare and Luncheon Club Organiser, Tonbridge and Mailing District, Women's Royal Voluntary Service.
- Margaret Burnett Moffett, Village Representative, Maud, Aberdeenshire, Women's Royal Voluntary Service.
- Reginald Stanley Morgan, Supervisor, Coil Winding Shop, British Broadcasting Corporation.
- George William Mowat, Chief Steward I, Officers' Mess, Edinburgh Castle, Ministry of Defence.
- William James Muir, Messenger, Department of Health & Social Security.
- Albert Thomas Mullins, lately Propagator Gardener, Richmond Park, Department of the Environment.
- Jack Scott Neville, Sub-Officer, Staffordshire Fire Brigade.
- James George Newcombe, Chief Instructor First Aid, Headquarters, St. John Ambulance Brigade.
- Harry Thomas Norfield, Head Messenger, Admiralty Experiment Works, Haslar, Gosport, Ministry of Defence.
- Mary Elizabeth Nurse, Technical Officer Grade II, Plan Reproduction Unit, Greater London Council.
- Evelyn Ronald O'Mahony, Technical Officer, Canterbury Telephone Area, South Eastern Telecommunications Region, Post Office.
- Lawrence Ormandy, Assistant Service Supervisor, Millom District, North Western Region, British Gas Corporation.
- Georgina Irene Outen, Canteen Assistant, Wales Gas Region, British Gas Corporation.
- Stanley Owen, Relief Signalman, London Midland Region, Widnes, British Railways Board.
- Reginald Ernest Packett, Craftsman (Coachmaker), London Country Bus Service Ltd., National Bus Company.
- William Thomas Alfred Paris, Office Keeper III, Department of Education & Science.
- William Arthur Parsons. For services to youth in Southampton.
- Henry Dornan Pendleton, Sergeant, Royal Ulster Constabulary.
- Alfred John Percival, Reception Hall Attendant, Stevenage Development Corporation.
- Mary Ann Phillips, Supervisory Plant Mounter, British Museum.
- Samuel Pinkney, Revenue Assistant, Board of Customs and Excise.
- David Leslie Pithie, Leading Fireman, West Midlands Fire Brigade.
- Leslie Pointon, Process and General Supervisory Grade B, Quality Assurance Directorate (Weapons), Cold Meece, Ministry of Defence.
- William George Pope, School Crossing Patrol Warden, Thundersley County Junior School, Benfleet, Essex.
- Thomas Eraser Prentice, Works Superintendent, Foster Wheeler Power Products.
- John Reginald Price, Craftsman Cutter Decorator, Stuart & Sons Ltd, Stourbridge.
- Rachel Eunice Prince, Senior Messenger, Ministry of Defence.
- Richard Douglas Prince, Skilled Labourer, Appleton Laboratory, Science Research Council.
- Evan James Radford, Ticket Inspector, Crosville Motor Services Ltd, National Bus Company.
- Kathleen Mary Reynolds, Churchwarden, Southwark Cathedral.
- Peter Anthony Rice, Constable, Metropolitan Police.
- Richard Nelson Robertson, Enrolled Nurse, Royal Dundee Liff Hospital.
- Thomas Robson, Constable, Metropolitan Police.
- Winifred Emily Grace Rogers, Deputy Leader, Truro Good Companions Club, British Red Cross Society.
- Herbert Rowley, Senior Messenger, Central Office of Information.
- Jean Russell, National Savings Group Collector, London Borough of Richmond.
- Shirley Gladys Russell, Senior Fire Control Operator, Surrey Fire Brigade.
- Harry Edward Rust, Distribution Superintendent, Norwich Water Division, Anglian Water Authority.
- Florence Adelaide Rutter, Machine Operator, MB Metals Ltd, Portslade, East Sussex.
- James Thomas Sanders, Packing and Dispatch Superintendent, Helicopter Engine Group, Rolls-Royce (1971) Ltd, Watford.
- Frank Kenneth Savill, Sergeant Major Instructor, Chadwell St. Mary Detachment, Army Cadet Force.
- John Gordon Selkirk, lately Supervisor of Caretakers, Glasgow Area, Scottish Special Housing Association.
- William Leslie Trevor Shellard, Fireman, Fire Authority for Northern Ireland.
- Bernard Henry Smith, Caretaker, Public Office Buildings, Long Eaton, Erewash Borough Council.
- Eric Owen Smith, Senior Paperkeeper, Home Office.
- Ralph Francis Smith, Carpenter, South Leicester Colliery, South Midlands Area, National Coal Board.
- Stanley Smith, Foreign & Commonwealth Office.
- William Watchorn Smith, Motor Mechanic, Workington Lifeboat, Royal National Lifeboat Institution.
- William Charles Stewart, lately Plant Operator (General Services), Oldbury Nuclear Power Station, South Western Region, Central Electricity Generating Board.
- James Joseph Sullivan, lately Front Side Trainer, Blastfurnaces, East Moors Works, Welsh Division, British Steel Corporation.
- Samuel Summers, River Patrol Officer, Port of London Authority.
- Michael David Sweeney, Foreign & Commonwealth Office.
- George William James Tanner, lately Production Development Engineer, British Hovercraft Corporation, Isle of Wight.
- Leonard Alexander Thirkettle, Chief Petty Officer Instructor, Islington Unit, Sea Cadet Corps.
- Richard Ivor Thomas, Leading Ambulanceman, Conwy, Gwynedd.
- Ellen Augusta Thorne. For services to the Avonmouth Sea Cadet Corps.
- Alwyne George Thorpe, Sub-Officer, Cambridgeshire Fire and Rescue Service.
- Gordon Tindall, Bulldozer Machine Operator, Messrs. Shellabear Price.
- Edward Tinsley, Kiln Supervisor, Enoch Wedgewood (Tunstall) Ltd, Stoke-on-Trent.
- Joseph Dyson Tomkinson. For services to the Scout Movement in Prestatyn.
- Charles Harry Edmund Toseland, Postal Executive "C", Head Post Office, Chichester, South Eastern Postal Region, Post Office.
- William John Tree, Civilian Instructional Officer Grade IV, Feltham Borstal.
- George William Troop, Construction Foreman, Nottinghamshire County Council.
- John Tuomey, Permanent Way Supervisor, Southern Region, British Railways Board.
- Alice Dorothy May Turner. For services to No. 443 (Basingstoke) Squadron, Air Training Corps.
- Robert Christopher Tyrrell, lately Club Supervisor, Navy, Army & Air Force Institutes, HMS Ganges, Ipswich.
- William Duncan Waite, Sergeant, Metropolitan Police.
- George Temple Wakenshaw, Locomotion Driver, Eastern Region, British Railways Board.
- Edward Walker, Driver, Springfields Works, British Nuclear Fuels Ltd.
- David Wallace, Motor Transport Fitter, Lanarkshire Civil Aviation Authority.
- Jack William Waller, Foreign & Commonwealth Office.
- George Augustus Charles Ward, Storekeeper Assistant I, HMS Temeraire, Portsmouth, Ministry of Defence.
- Ernest Ian Watson, Sergeant, Metropolitan Police.
- Robert William Watson, Utility Analyst, Procter & Gamble Ltd, Newcastle.
- Douglas Jack Webb, Electrical Shop Foreman, Hunting Engineering Ltd, Bedford.
- Bertie John Weddle, Senior Messenger, Department of Industry.
- Wilfred Thomas Whittamore, Head Porter, Epsom District Hospital and West Park Hospital.
- Francis Charles Wildman, Electrician (Supply), Eastern Electricity Board.
- David Wilson, Senior Head Keeper, Scottish National Zoological Park.
- James Taylor Winrow, Driver, London Midland Region, British Railways Board.
- Agnes Florence Wood, National Savings Group Collector, Oxford.
- Raymond Leslie Woolhead, Senior Foreman, Hawker Siddeley Aviation Ltd.
- Norah Wright, Warden, Glebe House Old People's Community Centre, Nottingham.
- Geoffrey Young, Caretaker, Allenton Junior High School, Derby.
- William John Young, Sub-Officer, Fire Authority for Northern Ireland.
- Norman Frank Youngs, Sub-Officer, Hereford & Worcester Fire Brigade.

Overseas Territories

- George Bailey. For public services in Saint Kitts-Nevis-Anguilla.
- Gerald Arthur Constantine, lately Works Supervisor, Public Works Department, Saint Helena.
- Arthur George Francis, lately Senior Storekeeper Public Works Department, Saint Helena.
- David Adolphus Gibson. For public, services in Saint Kitts-Nevis-Anguilla.
- Reginald Joseph Godoy, Deputy Chief Prison Officer, Belize.
- John David Humphreys. For public services in Saint Kitts-Nevis-Anguilla.
- Kwok Wai-shing, Senior Clerical Officer, Commerce & Industry Department, Hong Kong.
- Liu Nam, Assistant Officer I, Prison Service, Hong Kong.
- Ma Yuk-ling, Senior Clerical Officer, Royal Hong Kong Police Force.
- Mak Chun-keung, Clerical Officer I, General Clerical Service, Hong Kong.
- Nathan Pemberton. For public services in Saint Kitts-Nevis-Anguilla.
- Moses Kulasaru Pitakaka, Duplicator Operator, Chief Minister's Office, British Solomon Islands Protectorate.
- William Vuruha Siemanea, Assistant Geologist, Ministry of Natural Resources, British Solomon Islands Protectorate.
- Wilfred Smith, Assistant Generation Superintendent, Electricity Department, British Virgin Islands.

Australian States

State of New South Wales

- Ida Roxana Anderson. For services to the community.
- Winsome Mary Busby. For services to charity.
- Mary Jane Catts. For services to the community.
- Valerie Ada Dearberg. For services to the community.
- Lynda Olive Doughan. For services to medicine.
- Noel James Flanagan. For services to the community.
- Edith Rodda Glennie. For services to the community.
- Gloria Lillian Goodwin. For services to the community.
- Lindsay Gordon Henderson. For services to the State.
- Myra Agnes Huntress. For services to the community.
- Mary Michell Machattie. For services to sport.
- Mary Helen Thomas Mailler. For services to the community.
- Joseph Richley. For services to the community.
- Richard Tait Sargeant. For services to ex-servicemen.
- Robert Edward Smith. For services to the State.
- Elsie May Ward. For services to the community.
- Samuel Edward Welby. For services to the community.
- Stella Agnes West. For services to ex-servicemen.
- Cyril Ernest Wigzell. For services to sport.

State of Victoria

- Vera May Adamthwaite, of Quambatook. For services to the Red Cross and community.
- Rene Anderson, of Carrum. For services to the community.
- Myrtle Henrietta Victoria Baglin, of Chewton. For services to the Red Cross and hospital work.
- Christopher Campbell Bailey, of Ivanhoe. For services to conservation.
- Ernest Beresford Basford, of Essendon. For services to the community.
- Sydney Abraham Cohen, of Armadale. For services to the welfare of the Melbourne Hebrew Congregation.
- John Charles Downey, of Surrey Hills. For services to the community.
- Veronica Mary Duncan, of Gardenvale. For services to the community.
- Victor Frederick Fawaz, of Heyfield. For municipal and community services.
- Leonard Hales, of Northcote. For municipal and community services.
- Dorothy Hilda Harrison, of Hawthorn. For services to charity.
- William Birks Hawson, of Mildura. For services to irrigation and primary industry.
- Ernest Menzies Jackson, of Kangaroo Ground. For services to the environment and irrigation resources.
- Eileen Doris Nicolson Jacbs, of Coburg. For services to the community.
- Mary Helen Ruth Le Sueur, of East Kew. For services to the community.
- Francis Roy Manley, of Glen Iris. For services to education.
- The Reverend Canon Tom Davis Martin, of Ouyen. For services to the community.
- Ian Stephen Macleod Murphy, of Clematis. For services to community health.
- George James Frederick Oliver, of Melbourne. For public service.
- The Reverend Brother William Theodore O'Malley, of Ballarat. For services to education and sport.
- Griffith Anstice Collier Perkins, of Point Lonsdale. For Municipal and community services.
- Aubrey Francis Saunders, of Kilmore East. For services to the community.
- Phyllis Edna Sutton, of Mount Beauty. For services to the community.
- Lilly Alice Adelaide Williams, of Mount Martha. For services to Returned Services League Women.

State of Queensland

- Colleen Clarice Rachel Bloomfield, of Warwick. For services to the community.
- Cecil James Chapple, of Kingaroy. For services to the community.
- Neal Martin Connelly, of Enoggera. For services to the Diggers Association (Queensland).
- Florence Jane Crandll, of Toogoolawah. For services to the community.
- Selwyn Edward Davis, MC, ED, of Cairns. For services to the community and ex-service organisations.
- Kathleen Mary Downes, of Mackay. For services to the Australian Red Cross Society.
- Edwin Albert Joe Emery, of Nundah. For services to the Boy Scouts Movement.
- Francis Colington Geddes, of Toowoomba. For services to the community.
- Francis William Gibson. For services to the Cloncurry Fire Brigade Board.
- Mary Hales, of Mareeba. For services in assisting itinerant travellers in the isolated Cape York Peninsula area.
- Emma Louisa Henning, of Roma. For services to the community.
- Thelma Frances Hughes, of Chinchilla. For services to youth and church organisations.
- Dulcie Jean Jones, of Boulia. For nursing service to the community.
- Colin John Murray, of Moorooka. For services in the field of public health.
- James Richmond Watson, of Bulimba. For services to the Welfare Association for the Blind.

State of Western Australia

- Harry Baker, of Willagee. For services to industrial welfare and the community.
- Norman Edward Cunninghm of South Perth. For services to lawn tennis.
- Priscilla Daniels, of Katanning. For services in social work.
- Desmond Ernest Franklin, of Armadale. For services to the St. John Ambulance Association and related organisations.
- Margaret Theresa Harris. For services to music teaching and the community.
- Catherine Lockhart, of Rowethorpe. For services to the community through the Methodist Church.
- Rhoda Dorothy Smith, of Mount Pleasant. For services to slow learning children.
- Donald Gordon Thomas, of Wembley Downs. For services to sport and civil affairs.
- Phillip McCarthy White, of Mount Lawley. For services to sport and youth.

=== Royal Red Cross (RRC) ===
Army

- Colonel (Acting Brigadier) Joan Elisie Moriarty (378906), Queen Alexandra's Royal Army Nursing Corps.

Royal Air Force

- Wing Officer Irene Joyce Harris (406895), Princess Mary's Royal Air Force Nursing Service.
- Wing Officer Leila Mitchell (407231), Princess Mary's Royal Air Force Nursing Service.

==== Associate of the Royal Red Cross (ARRC) ====
Royal Navy

- Chief Medical Technician Hugh Cumming Gowans M773626U.

Army

- Major Peggy Elliot (452615), Queen Alexandra's Royal Army Nursing Corps.
- Lieutenant Colonel Una O'Sullivan (432822), Queen Alexandra's Royal Army Nursing Corps.
- Lieutenant Colonel Rosemary Sutton (399587), Queen Alexandra's Royal Army Nursing Corps (Retd.).

=== Air Force Cross (AFC) ===
Royal Air Force

- Wing Commander Allan Baillie Blackley (2620910).
- Wing Commander Peter David Leonard Cover (506987).
- Wing Commander Norman Donald McEwen (2556396).
- Squadron Leader Timothy Frank Cockerell (4231067).
- Squadron Leader Paul Frederick Constable (4165475).
- Squadron Leader Peter Warneford Day (4231751).
- Squadron Leader Richard Brian Duckett (608234).
- Squadron Leader Derek Ieuan Lewis (4231010).
- Squadron Leader John Holt Spencer (4230267).

=== Queen's Police Medal (CPM) ===
England and Wales

- Frank Ash, Deputy Chief Constable, Cambridgeshire Constabulary.
- Joseph Norman Ullock, Deputy Chief Constable, Cumbria Constabulary.
- David Powis, Deputy Assistant Commissioner, Metropolitan Police.
- Peter Anthony Collins, Assistant Chief Constable, Greater Manchester Police.
- George Mensforth Cook, Assistant Chief Constable, Durham Constabulary.
- Leslie Frank Pearce, Assistant Chief Constable, Avon and Somerset Constabulary.
- Walter William Robert Fleming, Commander, Metropolitan Police.
- Anthony Lowndes, Commander, Metropolitan Police.
- Eric Thomas Matthews, Commander, Metropolitan Police.
- Lionel Francis William Bowen, Chief Superintendent, Hampshire Constabulary.
- Jack Moulder, Superintendent, Hertfordshire Constabulary.
- Derek Frederick Thomas Tunn-Clarke, Chief Superintendent, Surrey Constabulary.
- Eric Stafford Wright, Chief Superintendent, Merseyside Police.
- Joan Aitchison, Superintendent, West Yorkshire Metropolitan Police.
- John Clifford Lashley, Superintendent, West Midlands Police.

Scotland

- James Gordon Glenn, lately Detective Chief Superintendent, Strathclyde Police.
- George Montgomery Johnstone, Chief Superintendent, Central Scotland Police.

Northern Ireland

- Frederick William Alfred Thompson McCormick, Chief Inspector, Royal Ulster Constabulary.

Overseas Territories

- Stanislaus Andrew Grieff, CPM, Commissioner of Police, Cayman Islands Police Force.
- Ramon Chun-sheung Young, MBE, CPM, Assistant Commissioner of Police, Royal Hong Kong Auxiliary Police Force.

Australian States

State of New South Wales

- Cecil Roy Abbott, Inspector 2nd Class, New South Wales Police Force.
- Roy Charles Hyde, Superintendent 2nd Class, New South Wales Police Force.
- Thomas James Kroehnert, Superintendent 2nd Class, New South Wales Police Force.
- Darcy Robert McDermott, Superintendent 1st Class, New South Wales Police Force.
- Gordon Peter Shonk, Inspector 2nd Class, New South Wales Police Force.
- Bruce Darnley Taylor, Superintendent 3rd Class, New South Wales Police Force.
- Patrick John Watson, Inspector 2nd Class, New South Wales Police Force.

State of Victoria

- William Edward Burns, Chief Superintendent, Victoria Police Force.
- Norman William Currie, Chief Superintendent, Victoria Police Force.
- Walter Gordon Perry, Chief Superintendent, Victoria Police Force.
- John Ronald George Salisbury, Assistant Commissioner, Victoria Police Force.
- Norman James Thomson, Chief Inspector, Victoria Police Force.
- Wilbur John Walker, Chief Superintendent, Victoria Police Force.

State of Queensland

- Leslie Robert Duffy, Superintendent, Queensland Police Force.
- Roy Leslie Hielscher, Superintendent, Queensland Police Force.
- Donald McDonald, Superintendent, Queensland Police Force.
- Edward Robinson, Superintendent, Queensland Police Force.
- Arthur William West, Superintendent, Queensland Police Force.

State of Western Australia

- Thomas Richard Blackman, Assistant Commissioner (Traffic) Western Australian Police Force.
- John Henry Porter, Chief Superintendent, Western Australian Police Force.

State of Tasmania

- Allan Arnold Knowles, Superintendent, Tasmanian Police Force.
- Allan Douglas Parker, Superintendent, Tasmania Police Force.
- Herbert Charles Rainbird, Chief Superintendent, Tasmania Police Force.

=== Queen's Fire Services Medal (QFSM) ===
England and Wales

- Arthur Charles Tanner, Assistant Chief Fire Officer, Hampshire Fire Brigade.
- John Mann, Assistant Chief Fire Officer, Mid Glamorgan Fire Brigade.
- Thomas Lister, Chief Fire Officer, West Midlands Fire Brigade.
- George Henry Moore, Chief Fire Officer, Lincolnshire Fire Brigade.
- Edward George McCrossen, Deputy Assistant Chief Fire Officer, London Fire Brigade.

Australian States

State of New South Wales

- Raymond Henry Watchorn, lately Fire Control Officer, Sutherland Shire Council.

State of Queensland

- Vivian William Dowling, Chief Officer, Metropolitan Fire Brigades, Brisbane.
- Colin Mackay MacKenzie, Chief Inspector of Fire Services.

=== Colonial Police Medal ===
- Ki-chiu Chik, Chief Inspector of Police, Royal Hong Kong Police Force.
- Kenwin McDonald Collins, Acting Station Sergeant, Royal Saint Lucia Police Force.
- David Toby Emmet, Superintendent of Police, Royal Hong Kong Police Force.
- Sik-fun Fong, Principal Fireman, Hong Kong Fire Services.
- Robert Francisco Garcia, Senior Inspector of Police, Royal Hong Kong Auxiliary Police Force.
- David Michael Holdroyd, Superintendent of Police, Royal Hong Kong Police Force.
- Esther Man-yan Hung, Chief Inspector of Police, Royal Hong Kong Auxiliary Police Force.
- Man-kee Lee, Sergeant, Royal Hong Kong Police Force.
- Kam-ming Li, Senior Inspector of Police, Royal Hong Kong Police Force.
- Cladius Thomas Lightbourne, Sergeant, Royal Turks & Caicos Islands Police Force.
- Hei-ming Ling, Detective Sergeant, Royal Hong Kong Police Force.
- Harold Stephen Moniz, Inspector of Police, Bermuda Police Force.
- Ting-cho Ng, Sergeant, Royal Hong Kong Police Force.
- James Nihopara, Acting Assistant Superintendent of Police, Solomon Islands Police Force.
- Oi-ling Pang, Sergeant, Royal Hong Kong Auxiliary Police Force.
- Albert Philip, Superintendent of Police, Royal Hong Kong Police Force.
- George Joachim Springer, Station Sergeant, Royal Saint Lucia Police Force.
- Ka-wah Wong, Principal Fireman, Hong Kong Fire Services.
- Biu Young, Assistant Divisional Officer, Hong Kong Fire Services.

=== Queen's Commendation for Valuable Service in the Air ===
Royal Air Force

- Squadron Leader Bruce Sidney Bull, AFM, (1583781).
- Squadron Leader Peter Augustus Clee (3519415).
- Squadron Leader Robert Graham Curry (4230522).
- Squadron Leader John Phillip Dacre (4231721).
- Squadron Leader Anthony Robert Freeman (682999).
- Squadron Leader Peter Geoffrey Ernest Gatter (2608134).
- Squadron Leader Jonathan Barratt Hill (608427).
- Squadron Leader Baladas Sarvothman Naidoo (4231170).
- Squadron Leader George William Thompson (579282).
- Acting Squadron Leader Harold Malcolm Grosse (4231435).
- Flight Lieutenant Robert Felix Byrne, MBE, (3512200).
- Flight Lieutenant Robert David Cole (608147).
- Flight Lieutenant Geoffrey George Dillingham (174407), (Retd.).
- Flight Lieutenant Peter Arnold Griffiths (608354).
- Flight Lieutenant Anthony Victor Bawden Hawken (608442).
- Flight Lieutenant David Victor Loveday (608461).
- Flight Lieutenant Brendon Charles Spikins (2620341), for services with the Royal Hong Kong Auxiliary Air Force.
- Master Signaller Harry Shaw, MBE, (B1067839).

United Kingdom

- Arthur John Burridge, Captain and Operations Director, Monarch Airlines Ltd.
- Sydney Gordon Corps, Deputy Chief Test Pilot, Airworthiness Division, Civil Aviation Authority.
- Derek Harold Davison, Captain, Chief Pilot and Assistant Managing Director, Britannia Airways.
- Leslie Wallis, Captain and Flight Manager, No. 5 Trident Flight, British Airways.

== Australia ==
=== Knights Bachelor ===
- Harold Garfield Behan, CMG, MBE, of Isisford, Queensland. For distinguished service to local government and to primary industry.
- Geoffrey Fraser Bowen, of Wahroonga, New South Wales. For distinguished service to commerce in the field of banking.
- Francis John Duval, CBE, of Old Beach, Tasmania. For distinguished service to industry and to international relations.
- Brian Scott Inglis, of Balwyn, Victoria. For distinguished service to industry.
- William Herbert Northam, CBE, of Bayview, New South Wales. For distinguished service to the community.
- William Joshua Vines, CMG, of Darling Point, New South Wales. For distinguished service to primary industry.

=== Order of Saint Michael and Saint George ===
==== Companion of the Order of St Michael and St George (CMG) ====
- Robert John Alison, of Dungog, New South Wales. For service to primary industry.
- Allan Duncan Fraser, of Turner, Australian Capital Territory. For parliamentary and public service.
- Sydney Ralph Reader, of Melrose Valley, Australian Capital Territory. For service to medicine.

=== Order of the British Empire ===
==== Knight Commander of the Order of the British Empire (KBE) ====
Military Division

- Vice Admiral Hugh David Stevenson, AC, CBE, (01114), Chief of Naval Staff.

Civil Division

- His Excellency Sir Edward John Bunting, CBE, High Commissioner for Australia in London.
- The Honourable David Eric Fairbairn, DFC, of Forrest, Australian Capital Territory. For distinguished parliamentary service.

==== Dame Commander of the Order of the British Empire (DBE) ====
Civil Division

- Marjorie Alice Collett Parker, OBE, of Launceston, Tasmania. For distinguished community service.

==== Commander of the Order of the British Empire (CBE) ====
Civil Division

- Victor Dudley Burgmann, of Deakin, Australian Capital Territory. For service to science.
- Kiernan John Joseph Dorney, DSO, OBE, of Townsville, Queensland. For services to medicine and the community.
- Samuel Charles Fitzpatrick, MBE, MC, of Casterton, Victoria. For services to medicine and the community.
- Frederick John Green, of Red Hill, Australian Capital Territory. For public service.
- Marjorie Florence Lawrence (Mrs. King), of Hot Springs, Arkansas, United States of America. For service to the performing arts.
- Leonard George Matthews, of Burwood, Victoria. For service to industrial relations.
- Edith Janet Allen Mayo, OBE, of Burnside, South Australia. For community service.
- Donald James Newlands, OBE, of Henley Beach, South Australia. For community service.
- John Basil Regan, of Wahroonga, New South Wales. For service to industry.

==== Officer of the Order of the British Empire (OBE) ====
Civil Division

- Kurt Aaron, of East Brisbane, Queensland. For services to medicine and to the community.
- Geraldine Christein, Lady Amies, of Christmas Hills, Victoria. For service to medicine.
- Margaret Sterling Bain, of Alice Springs, Northern Territory. For services to Aboriginal welfare.
- June Bronhill (Mrs. Finney), of Elizabeth Bay, New South Wales. For service to the performing arts.
- Allan Bruce Cameron, of Mount Eliza, Victoria. For services to local government and community.
- Vivian James Chalwin, of Cremorne, New South Wales. For community service.
- Henry Osborne Cox, of Kangaroo Valley, New South Wales. For services to primary industry.
- John Herbert Crawford, of Potts Point, New South Wales. For service to sport.
- John James Doohan, of St. Ives, New South Wales. For service to primary industry.
- Nancy, Lady Fairfax, of Double Bay, New South Wales. For community service.
- Richard Edward Garrard, MBE, of Highton, Victoria. For service to sport.
- Ronald Andrew Gilling, of Kirribilli, New South Wales. For service to architecture.
- Ernest Royce Gregory, MBE, of Gordon, New South Wales. For community service.
- Donald Leslie Grant Hazelwood, of Warrawee, New South Wales. For service to the performing arts.
- Robert Irvine Herriot, of St. Georges, South Australia. For services to primary industry and to education.
- Ernest Frank Hewett, of Waratah, New South Wales. For service to industry.
- Walter Jeffery Hucker, of Hunters Hill, New South Wales. For service to the media.
- Wilfred Leslie Jackson, of Manning, Western Australia. For service to industry.
- Clifford Frank Last, of South Yarra, Victoria. For service to the arts.
- John Sinclair Macqueen, of Cremorne, New South Wales. For service to sport.
- Charles Ades Service Page, of Sandy Bay, Tasmania. For service to motoring.
- Nita Veronica Pannell, of Dalkeith, Western Australia. For service to the performing arts.
- Margaret Scott (Mrs. Denton), of Toorak, Victoria. For service to ballet.
- Francis Aubie Sharr, of Nedlands, Western Australia. For service to librarianship.
- Eric Hamilton Smith, of Stonyfell, South Australia. For service to veterans' welfare.
- Ralph Noel Thompson, MBE, of Ivanhoe, Victoria. For public service.
- Helen Alma Newton Turner, of Roseville, New South Wales. For service to primary industry.
- Ivor Forsyth Wyatt, of St. Ives, New South Wales. For service to conservation.

==== Member of the Order of the British Empire (MBE) ====
Military Division

Royal Australian Navy

- Lieutenant Commander Peter Denis Rouse (01393).
- Lieutenant Mark Eyre Russell (0106852).

Royal Australian Military Forces

- Captain Ernest Alfred Flint (2121764), Royal Australian Army Ordnance Corps, Australian Citizen Military Forces.
- Major Cyril Brian McAuley (439162), Royal Australian Corps of Transport.
- Major Robert Cecil Moses, ED, (129062), Royal Australian Infantry, Australian Citizen Military Forces.
- Major Bernard Gratton Saunders (31336), Royal Australian Signals.
- Captain Wayne Edward Shennan (61333), Royal Australian Infantry.
- Major Gerald Duncan Woodrow (11905), Royal Australian Infantry.

Royal Australian Air Force

- Squadron Leader Michael John Cassidy (015343).
- Squadron Leader Brian Sproule Farrow (05333).
- Squadron Leader Alan Reginald Lockett (0221632).
- Squadron Leader Neil Alexander Smith (0315688).

Civil Division

- Elizabeth Margaret Aston, of Epping, New South Wales. For service to education.
- Allen Tristram Bath, of Lower Templestowe, Victoria. For public service.
- Harry Williamson Berwick, of Kingsford, New South Wales. For service to sport.
- Kenneth John Cameron, of Frankston, Victoria. For community service.
- William Stewart Clark, of Moorooka, Queensland. For public service.
- Leonard Vivian Cockrum, of Normanville, South Australia. For service to veterans' welfare.
- Robert Stephen Colquhoun, of Dynnyrne, Tasmania. For public service.
- Thomas Wilfred Coppin, of Deakin, Australian Capital Territory. For public service.
- Roy James Corrigan, of Turner, Australian Capital Territory. For public service.
- Ronald Bryant Curtis, of Mont Albert, Victoria. For public service.
- Selwyn Alfred Thomas Dalton, of Newcastle, New South Wales. For services to local government and community.
- Dorothea June Dunn, of Uranquinty, New South Wales. For services to the performing arts and community.
- Rowland Rule Edkins, of Ascot, Queensland. For community service.
- Philip Hugh Edwards, of Kingswood, South Australia. For public service.
- Samuel James Henry Herbert Fitzpatrick, of Dee Why, New South Wales. For public service.
- Colonel Patrick Vincent Osborne Fleming, ED, (Retired), of Camp Hill, Queensland. For community service.
- John William Follent, of Tweed, Heads, New South Wales. For community service.
- Lindsay Keith Fowler, of Rosanna, Victoria. For public service.
- Heather Doris Gell, of Cremorne, New South Wales. For services to education in the field of music.
- Archie Graham, of Warrnambool, Victoria. For community service.
- Councillor William Robert Hoole, of Naracoorte, South Australia. For services to local government and community.
- Colin Alexander Johnston, of Bolwarra Heights, New South Wales. For services to sport and to the community.
- Jack Taylor Johnstone, of Red Hill, Australian Capital Territory. For public service.
- John George Martin-Jones, of Chatswood, New South Wales. For public service.
- James Archibald Kennedy, of Albury, New South Wales. For community service.
- The Reverend Alexander William Laurie, of Oxley, Queensland. For community service.
- Jean Marjorie Lester, of Red Hill, Australian Capital Territory. For public service.
- Stewart Archibald Lindsay, of Warrnambool, Victoria. For service to hospital administration.
- Nicholas Lourantus, of Sydney, New South Wales. For community service.
- Rose Elizabeth McCauley, of Cremorne Point, New South Wales. For community service.
- Frances Mary Merenda, of Darling Point, New South Wales. For service to the community, particularly migrants.
- Jack Royston Paice, of Doncaster East, Victoria For public service.
- Chrysanthi Paspalis, of Darling Point, New South Wales. For community service.
- Richard Phillips, of Lyneham, Australian Capital Territory. For public service.
- Kenneth John Prowse, of Ainslie, Australian Capital Territory. For public service.
- John Stephens Pryor, of Katoomba, New South Wales. For service to local government.
- Major James Ronald Ricketts (Retired), of Darling Point, New South Wales. For community service.
- The Reverend Father Gregory Anastasios Sakellariou, of South Brisbane, Queensland. For community Service.
- Keith Edmund Thomas, of Randwick, New South Wales. For service to pharmacy.
- Alderman Clive William Tregear, of Ingleburn, New South Wales. For services to local government and the community.
- Eleanor Adeline Turnbull, of Nedlands, Western Australia. For community service.
- Raymond William Chegwin Vincent, of Sandy Bay, Tasmania. For service to sport.

=== Companion of the Imperial Service Order (ISO) ===
- Douglas William Buchanan, of Kardinya, Western Australia. Former State Manager, Australia Post.
- William Grant, of Hughes, Australian Capital Territory. First Assistant Commissioner, Taxation Office.
- Arthur Murdoch Wilson, of Glen Iris, Victoria. Former General Manager, Australia Post.

=== British Empire Medal (BEM) ===
Military Division
Royal Australian Navy

- Petty Officer Paula Robyn Bradley (W107659), Women's Royal Australian Naval Service.
- Petty Officer Darrell John Foster (R65696).

Royal Australian Military Forces

- Corporal Amat Binnoore (3167608), Royal Australian Corps of Transport.
- Corporal (T/Sergeant) James Thompson Butler (15309), Australian Army Catering Corps.
- Staff Sergeant Graham Stuart Hale (128951), Royal Australian Infantry, Australian Citizen Military Forces.
- Staff Sergeant Francis John Hobbins (15805), Royal Australian Infantry.
- Staff Sergeant John Samuel Robert McConnell (27357), Royal Australian Artillery.
- Staff Sergeant Ernest Taylor (36982), Royal Australian Artillery.

Royal Australian Air Force

- Flight Sergeant Frank Richardson Evans (A15593).
- Flight Sergeant James Douglas Hood (A55529).
- Flight Sergeant Terence Sidney Milham (A219495).
- Corporal Victor David Skinner (A222869).

Civil Division

- Kathleen Pauline Anderson, of Toongabbie, New South Wales. For community service.
- Norman Batrouney, of Albury, New South Wales. For community service.
- Colin John Batten, of Hughes, Australian Capital Territory. For public service.
- Thomas Francis Patrick Joseph Beatson, of Tweed Heads, New South Wales. For community service.
- Harold Clarence Thomas Begent, of Ainslie, Australian Capital Territory. For public service.
- Arthur Lawrence Beven, of Broken Hill, New South Wales. For service to the performing arts.
- Myee Sophie Birk, of Cronulla, New South Wales. For community service.
- Frank Davis Bull, of Griffith, Australian Capital Territory. For public service.
- Margaret Jean Conway, of Como, Western Australia. For public service.
- Ashley Allan Coops, of Sylvania Waters, New South Wales. For community service.
- Cyril David Cribb, of Como, Western Australia. For public service.
- Ada Olive Leathe Cutler, of West Ryde, New South Wales. For community services.
- Katharine Grace Daley, of East Malvern, Victoria. For public service.
- Ronald Wilfred Kenneth Dare, of Watsonia, Victoria. For public service.
- William Darwin, of Ascot Vale, Victoria. For community service.
- Minnie Josephine Downes, of Wauchope, New South Wales. For public service.
- Stuart Norwood Earle, of Richmond, New South Wales. For community service.
- Norman Edwin Harold Elliott, of Griffith, Australian Capital Territory. For community service.
- Elsie Evans, of Tamworth, New South Wales. For community service.
- Zoe Ita Goldsworthy, of South Yarra, Victoria. For public service.
- Cecil James Grady, of Girilambone, New South Wales. For community service.
- Shirley Winsome Greer, of Hackett, Australian Capital Territory. For public service.
- Helen Dods Guscott, of Pennington, South Australia. For community service.
- Sydney Frederick Warr Halbish, of Launching Place, Victoria. For community service.
- Kenneth Francis Jago, of Malvern, Victoria. For public service.
- Jean Priscilla Jenner, of North Mackay, Queensland. For community service.
- Harold Kendall King, of Carlingford, New South Wales. For public service.
- Joyce Ellen Koch, of Canberra, Australian Capital Territory. For public service.
- Gladys Irene Lang, of Double Bay, New South Wales. For community service.
- Joan Margot McCarthy, of Mosman, New South Wales. For public service.
- Charles Gall McLeod, of Northfield, South Australia. For public service.
- Hilda Maud Martin, of Launceston, Tasmania. For community service.
- Elizabeth Martyn, of Fish Creek, Victoria. For community service.
- Roland Helmut Moisel, of Bundaberg, Queensland. For community service.
- Elizabeth Margaret Moore, of Merimbula, New South Wales. For community service.
- David William Nash, of King Island, Tasmania. For community service.
- Eva May Nash, of Ganmain, New South Wales. For community service.
- Joan O'Donnell, of North Fitzroy, Victoria. For public service.
- Mavis Olsen, of Chadstone, Victoria. For public service.
- Vera Margaret Palmer, of Tamworth, New South Wales. For community service.
- Doreen Carnella Roughley, of Killara, New South Wales. For community service.
- John William Scantleton, of Kerang, Victoria. For public service.
- Bert Scetrine, of Scottsvale, Tasmania. For community service.
- Edith Margaret Bennett Scriven, of Yeronga, Queensland. For community service.
- Margaret Sewell, of Gunnedah, New South Wales. For community service.
- William Vernon Smith, of Whyalla Nome, South Australia. For community service.
- John Stephen Smyth, of South Beecroft, New South Wales. For public service.
- Dorothea Marie Staggs, of Strathfield, New South Wales. For community service.
- Harold Frederick Jarman Steed, of Lyons, Australia Capital Territory. For public service.
- William Henry Storey, of Kingsgrove, New South Wales. For community service.
- Ethel Rose Welsh, of Cooma, New South Wales. For community service.

=== Royal Red Cross (RRC) ===
- Colonel Cecily Sinclair Smith (F5374), Royal Australian Army Nursing Corps.

==== Associate of the Royal Red Cross (ARRC) ====
- Wing Officer Margery Fay Hood (N14819), Royal Australian Air Force Nursing Service.

=== Air Force Cross (AFC) ===
Royal Australian Navy

- Lieutenant Commander Graeme Stuart King (01659).

Royal Australian Air Force

- Squadron Leader Terence John Carter (0212549).
- Flight Lieutenant Ross Lester Mathieson (0316852).
- Squadron Leader Terry Charles Arthur Wilson (055536).

=== Air Force Medal (AFM) ===
Royal Australian Air Force

- Corporal Peter Raymond Inglis (A318391).
- Leading Aircraftsman Gary Lincoln Jones (As 6916).

=== Queen's Police Medal (CPM) ===
- Anthony James Barge, Superintendent First Class, Commonwealth Police Force.
- John Laurence Connolly, Inspector, Commonwealth Police Force.
- Roy Farmer, Superintendent First Class, Commonwealth Police Force.
- Norman Headland, Superintendent Third Class, Commonwealth Police Force.
- Percival Daniel McConaghy, Superintendent, Australian Capital Territory Police Force.

=== Queen's Fire Services Medal (QFSM) ===
- Jack Keith Mundy, Commissioner, Australian Capital Territory Fire Brigade.

== Barbados ==
=== Knight Bachelor ===
- Senator The Honourable Arnott Samuel Cato, President of the Senate of Barbados.

== Mauritius ==
=== Knight Bachelor ===
- Satcam Boolell, Minister of Agriculture and Natural Resources and the Environment.

=== Order of Saint Michael and Saint George ===
==== Companion of the Order of St Michael and St George (CMG) ====
- Romaschandraduth Burrenchobay, Vice-Chancellor, University of Mauritius.

=== Order of the British Empire ===
==== Commander of the Order of the British Empire (CBE) ====
Civil Division

- Rajmohunsing Jomadar, High Commissioner for Mauritius in India.
- Abdool Hak Mahomed Osman, Ambassador for Mauritius to the Arab Republic of Egypt.

==== Officer of the Order of the British Empire (OBE) ====
Civil Division

- Roland Desmarais. For his contribution to the development of electrical services.
- Jaynarain Dhowtall. For services to the co-operative movement and for voluntary social work.
- Seenarain Seejore. For voluntary social work.

==== Member of the Order of the British Empire (MBE) ====
Civil Division

- Said Mohamud Abdoolraman, formerly in the Marine Services.
- Muriel Gladys Elsie Hermelin, lately Homecraft Instructress, Ministry of Education and Cultural Affairs.
- Coomarparsad Phul. For services to the co-operative movement.
- Jeetan Rampersad. For services to local government.

=== British Empire Medal ===
Civil Division

- Alex Dairion, Chef, Governor-General's Department.

=== Mauritius Police Medal ===
- Ernest Adolphe Cecilia, Assistant Superintendent, Mauritius Police Force.
- Paul Benjamin Domingue, Bandmaster, Mauritius Police Force.
- Jugmohunsing Fulena, Commissioner of Police, Mauritius Police Force.
- Abdool Rajack Furzun, Assistant Superintendent, Mauritius Police Force.
- Edwin Robert Joseph Gauthier, lately Quartermaster, Mauritius Police Force.
- Goinsamy Mardemootoo, Assistant Commissioner, Mauritius Police Force.
- Jean Harold Munso, Assistant Superintendent, Mauritius Police Force.
- Cassam Oomar, Superintendent, Mauritius Police Force.
- Atwaroosing Rajarai, Deputy Commissioner, Mauritius Police Force.
- Bardooaz Rughoonundun, Superintendent, Mauritius Police Force.

== Fiji ==
=== Order of the British Empire ===
==== Knight Commander of the Order of the British Empire (KBE) ====
Civil Division

- Josua Rasilau Rabukawaqa, CBE, MVO, Administrative Officer Class 1A, Foreign Affairs Department.

==== Member of the Order of the British Empire (MBE) ====
Military Division

- Major Inosi Tawakedrau, ED, Fiji Infantry Regiment.
- Warrant Officer Class 2 Lemeki Temo, Royal Fiji Military Forces.

Civil Division

- Hasan Raza. For services to the community.
- Pandit Shyam Narayan Sharma. For services to the community.
- Ratu Orisi Vuki, Senior Assistant Roko Tui Macuata.

==== Officer of the Order of the British Empire (OBE) ====
Civil Division

- Somwati Sheila Nandan. For services to the community.

=== British Empire Medal ===
Civil Division

- Kepueli Bulusese, Chairman, Kabara Tikina Council.
- Iverna McCaig, Suva City Gardener.

== Grenada ==
=== Knight Bachelor ===
- William Allan Patrick Branch. For services to agriculture.

=== Order of the British Empire ===
==== Commander of the Order of the British Empire (CBE) ====
Civil Division

- Andrew Wilfred Albert Redhead. For services to the community.

==== Officer of the Order of the British Empire (OBE) ====
Civil Division

- Godwin Algernon Brathwaite, Cabinet Secretary.

==== Member of the Order of the British Empire (MBE) ====
Civil Division

- Samuel Prince Albert Abraham, Education Officer.

=== Imperial Service Order ===
- Winston Edward Ernest Thomas, Permanent Secretary, Ministry of Health and Housing.

=== British Empire Medal ===
Civil Division

- Clunis Cyrus, Road Officer, Public Works Department.
- Clement Griffith. For services to farming.
- Norbery Bridgalan Caryl Paterson, Engineering Assistant, Ministry of Communications and Works.
- Lionel Julien St. Paul. For services to the community.
