= Bernard Dix =

British trade unionist

Bernard Hubert Dix (30 March 1925 – 20 April 1995) was a British trade unionist.

Born in Woolwich, Dix left school when he was fourteen and worked as a fitter at the Royal Arsenal. During World War II, he served with the Queen's Own Royal West Kent Regiment, then with the Royal Engineers, where he used his skills as a fitter. In 1945, he was hospitalised in South Africa with tuberculosis, and there began reading material from the Communist Party of South Africa. He also met Jack Rae, a fellow patient who was a member of the Communist Party of Great Britain (CPGB), and the two put together a hospital newsletter based largely on communist sources. He began assisting the African Mine Workers' Union and the Springbok Legion. He married a nurse, but the marriage rapidly fell apart, and the British Army decided to repatriate him to England in 1947.

In England, Dix joined the Young Communist League. He remarried, and began working, initially as a building labourer, then in a clerical post for the Soviet Embassy. In 1949, he was finally admitted onto a training scheme for engineering draughtspeople. He drifted away from the CPGB, joining the Labour Party, and began devoting much of his time to the Association of Engineering and Shipbuilding Draughtsmen (AESD). He won a scholarship to the London School of Economics, where he completed a one-year course in trade unionism, and also began writing for Tribune, the left-wing Labour-supporting newspaper.

In 1951, Dix met Jock Haston, a formerly prominent Trotskyist, and through him, he became interested in the work of Max Shachtman and his Third Camp theory. By 1955, Dix was writing for Shachtman's Labor Action newspaper as its "London Correspondent", while he and a small group of co-thinkers, including Stanley Newens, joined Tony Cliff's Socialist Review Group. Dix edited Socialist Review for short periods in 1955 and 1957. Also in 1955, he began working in the Editorial Department of the Trades Union Congress, and in order to avoid difficulties, he began using the pseudonym "Owen Roberts" for his socialist activities.

In 1959, Dix left Socialist Review Group after Cliff won a majority for a position arguing that the Labour Party did not have revolutionary potential. Shachtman had also wound up his political organisation, although Dix remained close to Hal Draper, a former supporter of Shachtman in the U.S. He himself left Labour in 1961, disappointed with Hugh Gaitskell's leadership, and developed an interest in anarchism, but he rejoined Labour in 1963, and also began working as the publicity and research officer of the National Union of Public Employees (NUPE). Although he was able to reinvent the union's newspaper, he had a poor working relationship with Sydney Hill, the union's general secretary, and only remained in the post after Vic Feather personally persuaded him that he would find Dix a more senior position once Hill retired. With this backing, and that of Alan Fisher, who succeeded Hill, Dix was able to create a shop steward system in the union, and developing a novel strategy of rolling industrial action.

Dix was promoted to become NUPE's first Assistant General Secretary in 1975, and immediately secured the restructure of the union's decision making bodies, giving shop stewards a stronger role, and reserving places on key bodies for women. Working closely with Fisher, NUPE became one of the most active unions in the late 1970s, and grew rapidly.

Dix stood repeatedly for the National Executive Committee (NEC) of the Labour Party. Although never elected, he was co-opted to its social policy group, and after taking the runner-up spot for the NEC in 1980, he was the automatic replacement for Tom Bradley when he defected to the Social Democratic Party. However, Dix was again defeated in the 1981 election for the NEC. He retired in 1981, and left the Labour Party in 1981, concerned about its direction after the editorial board of Militant was expelled.

In 1982, Dix moved to Mynyddcerrig, where he organised a community bus and became chairman of the community council. He learned Welsh in order to conduct business on the council in that language, and in 1983 joined Plaid Cymru. Within the party, he campaigned in support of the UK miners' strike, but he soon became disillusioned with Plaid, and instead focused his time on writing on the early history of NUPE. Increasingly suffering poor health, he died in 1995.

== Bibliography ==
Low Pay and how to End it: A Union View (1974)

Serving the Public Building the Union: The History of NUPE - Volume One: The Forerunners 1889-1928 (1987)

== See also ==
- National Union of Public Employees

Trade union offices
Preceded by New position	Assistant General Secretary of the National Union of Public Employees; 1975–1981	Succeeded by Tom Sawyer
