= LaRay =

LaRay is a given name and surname. Notable people with the name include:

== People with the given name ==
- LaRay Denzer, American historian and academic
- Erik LaRay Harvey, American actor
- Jason LaRay Keener, American filmmaker
- Vashone LaRay Adams, American football player

== People with the surname ==
- Deji LaRay, American actor, writer, editor and producer
