= Margaret McDonagh, Baroness McDonagh =

British politician (1961–2023)

The Right Honourable The Baroness McDonagh

Member of the House of Lords
- Lord Temporal
- Life peerage 24 June 2004 – 24 June 2023

General Secretary of the Labour Party
- In office 1998–2001
- Leader: Tony Blair
- Preceded by: Tom Sawyer
- Succeeded by: David Triesman

Personal details
- Born: Margaret Josephine McDonagh; 26 June 1961 Mitcham, Surrey, England
- Died: 24 June 2023 (aged 61) Colliers Wood, London, England
- Party: Labour
- Relations: Siobhain McDonagh (sister)
- Education: Holy Cross School, New Malden Kingston College of Further Education
- Alma mater: Brunel University London; Kingston Business School; Harvard Business School

Margaret Josephine McDonagh, Baroness McDonagh (26 June 1961 – 24 June 2023) was a British Labour politician who served as General Secretary of the Labour Party from 1998 to 2001. She later worked as a management consultant and was a co-president of the Labour Party Irish Society, and sat in the House of Lords as a life peer from 2004 until her death.

== Early life and education ==
Margaret Josephine McDonagh was born on 26 June 1961 in Mitcham, Surrey, to an Irish family. She was the younger of two daughters of Cumin McDonagh, a construction labourer, and Breda McDonagh (née Doogue), a psychiatric nurse. Her elder sister was Siobhain McDonagh, who was elected the Labour member of Parliament for Mitcham and Morden in 1997. Margaret was educated at Holy Cross School in New Malden and gained a Bachelor of Science degree in government at Brunel University London and a Master of Arts in advanced marketing at Kingston Business School, and later completed an Advanced Management Program at Harvard Business School.

== Career ==
McDonagh was part of the New Labour leadership inner circle for the 1997 general election campaign and was one of the inner-core deciding the official party position on specific issues.

In 1998, McDonagh became Labour's first female general secretary, after having served as deputy general secretary and general election campaign co-ordinator the previous year. She was not always popular with the grassroots and parts of the Parliamentary Party due to her perceived "control-freakery". She was considered to have badly mishandled the party's London mayoral candidate selection process, which resulted in Ken Livingstone winning 2000 mayoral election as an independent candidate, leaving the official Labour candidate, Frank Dobson, in third place, with subsequent disapproval amongst the party members. McDonagh later apologised for the mayoral electoral loss. Her organisational skills came to the fore however in the delivery of two general election landslide victories in the 1997 and 2001 general election. She was also criticised for accepting, without consultation, a £100,000 donation from Daily Express and adult magazine publisher Richard Desmond, and for still counting as party members those in arrears of up to 15 months to delay news of declining membership emerging.

After stepping down from the position of General Secretary following the 2001 general election, McDonagh took a short Harvard University business course and became general manager of Express Newspapers. She was a non-executive director of Standard Life, TBI plc, and CareCapital Group plc. She was chair of the Standard Life Charitable Trust.

McDonagh became a life peer on 24 June 2004, and was created Baroness McDonagh, of Mitcham and of Morden in the London Borough of Merton.

In 2013, McDonagh was appointed chair of the Smart Meter Central Delivery Body, which then became Smart Energy GB, an independent organisation that aims to inform consumers about smart meters and their national rollout across Great Britain.

== Personal life ==
McDonagh lived with her sister Siobhain in Colliers Wood, London, for most of their adult lives. She was diagnosed with glioblastoma in 2021. In March 2023 her sister took a £1.2 million interest-free loan from Labour donor Lord Alli, to buy a house in south-west London with downstairs bedroom and bathroom suited for her terminally ill sister.

She died on 24 June 2023, at age 61, and 19 years to the day after she was first appointed to the Lords. She was described as the "linchpin" of New Labour. Pat McFadden wrote that she was a "true working-class hero".

== Legacy ==
At Labour Party Conference 2023 it was announced that the Labour party would be launching the Margaret McDonagh Leadership Academy in her honour. David Evans, the General Secretary of the Labour Party, speaking at the launch of the Academy said it will "ensure that future generations will also know Margaret".

Party political offices
Preceded by Tom Sawyer	General Secretary of the Labour Party; 1998–2001	Succeeded by David Triesman
