= St Helen and St Katharine =

Coordinates: 51°40′35″N 1°17′49″W

St Helen & St Katharine

Location
- Faringdon Road; Abingdon, Oxfordshire, OX14 1BE; England

Information
- Type: Private day school
- Religious affiliation: Church of England
- Established: 1903; 1938 (current school)
- Local authority: Oxfordshire
- Department for Education URN: 123313 Tables
- Headmistress: Sarah Rollings
- Gender: Girls
- Age: 9 to 18
- Enrolment: 700
- Colours: Maroon, Pink & Navy
- Website: shsk.org.uk

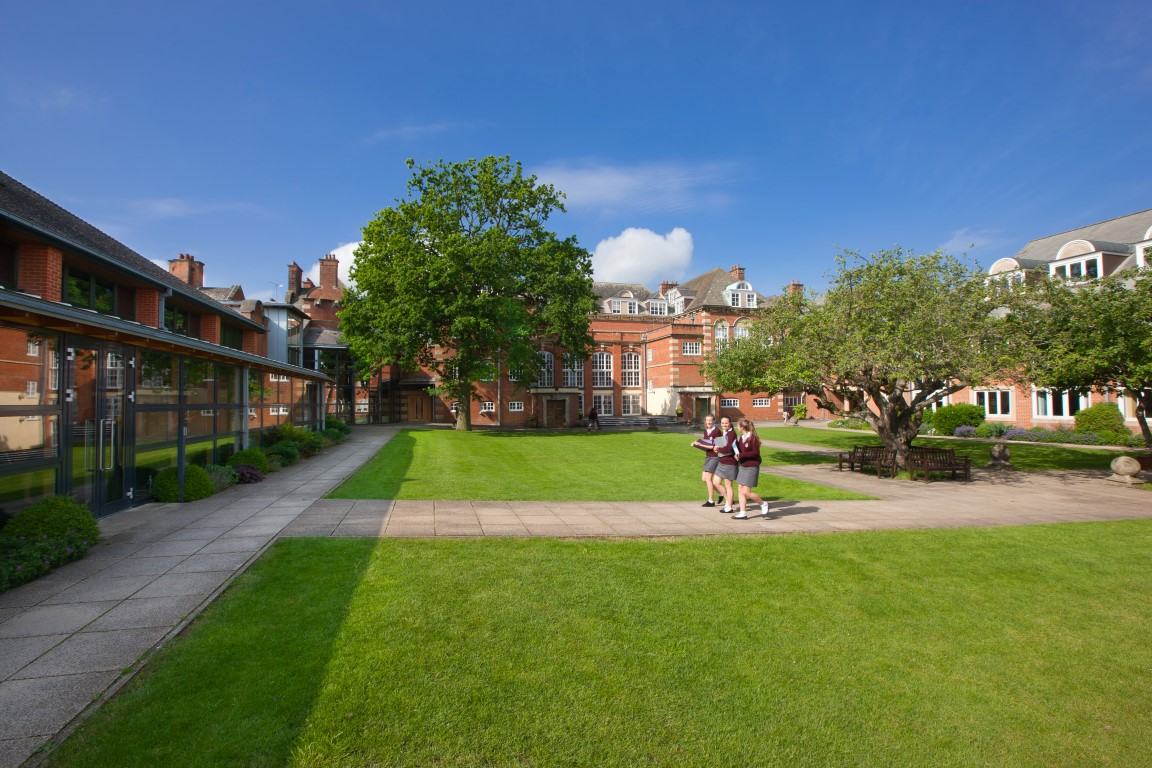

St. Helen and St. Katharine is a private girls' day school in Abingdon, Oxfordshire, the United Kingdom.

== History ==
St. Helen's School, Abingdon was founded in 1903 by the Community of St Mary the Virgin to provide a Christian education for girls. In 1938, St Helen's merged with Wantage-based St. Katharine's School, which had been founded in 1894. The merged schools became St. Helen & St. Katharine, in Abingdon.

== The present school ==
St. Helen and St. Katharine is an independent day school for girls on the outskirts of Abingdon. 720 pupils, aged 9 to 18, study on a campus of Edwardian and modern buildings, set in 22 acres.

== Buildings ==
The original school building dates from 1906, and there were building programmes in the late 20th and early 21st century. In 2023, the school opened a sixth form centre, the Benedict Building, with nine classrooms, a higher education Library, independent and group study spaces, a lecture hall and café.

== Curriculum ==
The curriculum includes Art and Ceramics, Biology, A level Business, Chemistry, Classics, Computer Science, Drama, Design and Technology, A level Economics, English, Food and Nutrition, French, Geography, German, History, Learning skills, Learning support, Mandarin, Mathematics, Music, Outdoor Learning, Physics, Physical Education, A level Politics, A level Psychology, RPE (Religion, Philosophy and Ethics), and Spanish.

Together with Abingdon School, students in year 10 studying German can participate in an exchange program with the Ratsgymnasium Bielefeld in the German city of Bielefeld.

The school has a chapel, built in 1922, in which a weekly Eucharist is offered to staff and pupils.

== Sport ==
St Helen and St Katherine has been in the Top 200 Sport Schools rankings since 2016 and was ranked the top girls school for sport in Oxfordshire and fourth in the UK by School Sport Magazine 2024. Over 50 students at the school are involved in county, regional or national teams for their respective sports. In addition to this the Director of PE and sport, Charlotte Barras, is a previous English rugby union player.

The Sports Centre, which was built in 2016, includes two sports halls, a dance studio, a fitness suite, an ergo room and a spin room. These facilities are used for sports such as indoor hockey, netball, badminton, cricket, basketball, fencing, trampolining, dance and gymnastics. All girls also take part in fitness and conditioning. Outdoor facilities include three lacrosse pitches, six netball and tennis courts, sports fields and a sports pavilion, located at Church Farm. Other sports include athletics, cross country and swimming.

== Awards and recognition ==
St Helen and St Katherine won the Independent Girls School of the year award 2025. They have also been ranked the top independent girls school in Oxfordshire and fifth in the South East by The Times Parent Power in 2025, 2024, 2023 and 2022.

== Alumnae ==
- Mary Allen, former chief executive of the Royal Opera House
- Hatti Archer (née Hatti Dean), athlete
- Veronica Ashworth, RAF officer and nurse
- Samantha Cameron, businesswoman and wife of former British Prime Minister David Cameron
- Johannah Cutts, Justice of the High Court
- Jennie Formby, senior official in the Unite trade union and General Secretary of the Labour Party
- Elspeth Hanson, violinist with "Bond"
- Phyllis Hartnoll, poet, author and editor
- Claire Lawrence, former ambassador to Lithuania
- Anne Mueller, civil servant and academic
- Lindsey Russell, TV and radio presenter
- Alice Thomson, journalist
- Jane Tranter, TV producer and former head of BBC Worldwide Productions
