= Peter Watt =

Former general secretary of the British Labour Party

General Secretary of the Labour Party
- In office January 2006 – November 2007
- Leader: Tony Blair Gordon Brown
- Preceded by: Matt Carter
- Succeeded by: Ray Collins

Personal details
- Born: 20 July 1969 (age 57) York, England
- Party: Labour

Peter Martin Watt (born 20 July 1969) was the General Secretary of the Labour Party in the United Kingdom from January 2006 until he resigned in November 2007 as a result of the Donorgate affair. Watt was then a member of the National Society for the Prevention of Cruelty to Children (NSPCC) Executive Board. He is now working for Hammersmith council directing all services relating to children.

Since 2021 working for the National Autistic Society. An organisation working to support people who are autistic and their carers

== Early and family life ==
From 1989 to 1992 Watt trained as a nurse at a predecessor institution to Bournemouth University, then worked for Poole Hospital NHS Trust.

He is married to Claire, living in Leicestershire, together they have seven children and four grandchildren.

== Labour Party ==
From 1996 he worked for the Labour Party, first as a local organiser for Battersea and Wandsworth, then in Labour Party head office on election delivery and recruitment and then as Regional Director of the Eastern region. In 2004 he gained a Professional Certificate in Management from the Open University.

He returned to the Labour Party head office as Director of Finance and Compliance in 2005, a role that bridges legal and financial party issues and also usually includes a tacit role of enforcing party discipline and sorting out internal disputes. Viewed as loyal to the party leadership, he has on occasion come into conflict with the trade union movement over party policy and organisation, especially apparent at the Labour Party Conference in 2005.

Watt was appointed as general secretary by the Party's National Executive Committee on 7 November 2005. He was not the candidate favoured by Prime Minister and Labour Party leader Tony Blair, but won the NEC vote by some margin over his eventual successor Ray Collins.

BBC News reported that he resigned as general secretary on 26 November 2007 and he was quoted as saying that he knew about an arrangement by which one individual, David Abrahams, had made a number of donations to the Labour Party through third parties without the fact that he was ultimate donor being reported. He said that he had not appreciated that he had failed to comply with the reporting requirements. Watt revealed he had known about the arrangement for about a year. In May 2009 the Crown Prosecution Service decided there was insufficient evidence for any prosecution relating to these events.

== Later career ==
From March 2008 to December 2010 Watt was Chief Executive of The Campaign Company, a Croydon based communications consultancy.

In January 2010, Watt published the book Inside Out, written with Isabel Oakeshott, describing his experiences as a senior Party official and his time as General Secretary of the Party.

In November 2010 it was announced that he would become the Chief Executive of the older people's charity Counsel and Care from 1 February 2011.

On 26 September 2011, Watt joined the NSPCC as Director of Child Protection, Advice and Awareness, on the NSPCC Executive Board. In this role, he is responsible for leading the NSPCC's work to raise awareness of and increase support for child protection among the general public and key adult audiences. His role includes being Head of the NSPCC's Helpline.

In September 2011, Peter Contributed to What next for Labour? Ideas for a new generation, his piece was entitled 'Building a party for the future

In July 2021 Watt joined the National Autistic Society.

== Bibliography ==
- Watt, Peter; Oakeshott, Isabel (2010). Inside out: my story of betrayal and cowardice at the heart of New Labour. Biteback. ISBN 9781849540384.

Party political offices
Preceded by Matt Carter	General Secretary of the Labour Party; 2006–2007	Succeeded by Ray Collins
