= Bennie Abrahams =

English Labour Party politician

Personal details
- Born: 28 July 1906; Durham, England
- Died: 29 January 1990 (aged 83)
- Spouse: Marion Shapiro (m. 1939)
- Children: David Abrahams

Benney (Bennie) Abrahams (28 July 1906 – 29 January 1990) was a local Labour Party politician in Newcastle upon Tyne, England, as well as Lord Mayor of Newcastle.

== Biography ==
Born in Durham, Abrahams was a Labour councillor for the Monkchester ward of Newcastle City Council, and in 1981/2 Lord Mayor of Newcastle. He died in January 1990 at the age of 83.

Abrahams married Marion Shapiro, a concert hall violinist for the Liverpool Philharmonic Orchestra in Liverpool in 1939. She also became a Labour councillor in Newcastle. They had one son, David Abrahams, a property developer and political activist.
