= Sarah Barker =

Sarah Barker may refer to:

- Sarah Evans Barker, United States district judge
- Sarah Ashlee Barker, American college basketball player

== See also ==
- Sara Barker, British political administrator
