= Sara Barker =

British political administrator

Dame Sara Elizabeth Barker DBE (15 February 1904 – 19 September 1973) was a British political administrator, prominent in the Labour Party.

== Biography ==
Born in the West Riding of Yorkshire, Barker's father was an Independent Labour Party activist and served a term as Mayor of Halifax. Barker studied at Halifax Technical College, and with the Workers Educational Association, and became active in the Labour Party. At the age of sixteen, she became the women's officer for the local branch of the party.

In 1935, Barker was appointed as secretary and agent for the Halifax branch of the Labour Party, and she gradually rose to prominence, becoming the party's Yorkshire women's officer in 1942, assistant national agent in 1951, and Chief Women's Officer in 1960. In 1962, she became National Agent for the party, the first women to hold this post.

In 1968, she served as Acting General Secretary, following the resignation of Len Williams, and until Harry Nicholas was appointed.

She retired from her posts in 1969, and was appointed a Dame Commander of the Order of the British Empire (DBE) in the 1970 Prime Minister's Resignation Honours.

Party political offices
Preceded by Leonard Williams	Labour Party Assistant National Agent; 1951–1960	Succeeded by Reg Underhill
Preceded by Mary Sutherland	Labour Party Chief Women's Officer; 1960–1962	Succeeded by Constance Kay
Preceded by Len Williams	Labour Party National Agent; 1962–1969	Succeeded by Ron Hayward
