= Labour Party proxy and undeclared donations (2007) =

UK political scnadal

The Labour party proxy and undeclared donations was a political scandal involving the British Labour Party in November and December 2007, when it was discovered that, contrary to legislation passed during the Blair Government, the Party had been receiving significant financial donations made anonymously via third parties. The careers of Labour Party treasurer Peter Watt and the leader of the Scottish Labour Party, Wendy Alexander, were curtailed as a consequence. In May 2009 the Crown Prosecution Service decided there was insufficient evidence for any prosecution relating to these events.

== Background ==
=== Abrahams donations ===
Tyneside lawyer David Abrahams had donated at least £548,850 to the Labour Party since 2003 via two colleagues, his solicitor and the wife of an employee, which broke electoral law forbidding the use of proxy donors. Abrahams had been involved with the Labour party over many years.

In the time since Prime Minister Gordon Brown had come to power, Abrahams was now Labour's third largest donor behind Lord Sainsbury of Turville (£2 million) and Iranian businessman Mahmoud Khayami (£320,000 in September 2007). Mr Khayami's donations subsequently came under some scrutiny in the press, though there was no indication that they were in any way illegal. Abrahams has donated at least £548,850 since 2003, via two colleagues, his solicitor and the wife of an employee.

Abrahams's secretary Janet Kidd "gave" £80,000, while builder Ray Ruddick – who has "given" a total of £196,000 according to a political donors list – had contributed £104,000 of the £222,000 donated by Abrahams in the five months since Mr Brown became PM. Mrs Kidd has "donated" £185,000 since 2003, and is also listed as a £5,000 donor to Harriet Harman's successful Labour deputy leadership bid in 2007.

The Mail on Sunday, which broke the story, investigated the donations after it emerged that builder Ray Ruddick lived in a former council house he had bought for £12,000, and drove a second-hand blue Ford Transit; while Mrs Kidd was a secretary living in Whickham near Gateshead. It also emerged that £167,000 had been given previously through another intermediary, solicitor John McCarthy.

Another go-between used by Abrahams, Janet Dunn, who is a lifelong Conservative Party supporter and a lollipop lady by profession, has subsequently claimed that she never knowingly paid any money to the Labour Party; she had only on one occasion signed a blank cheque for Mr Abrahams for £25,000 after he had paid a similar amount into her own bank account. "I thought it was just a bit of business", her husband has said. However a donation of £25,000 in her name was received by the Labour Party in 2003, although Mrs Dunn says the first she knew of this was on 26 November 2007.

After the news broke of Mrs Kidd's "donation" to her campaign, Harriet Harman made a statement saying she accepted a donation to her campaign for the Labour Party deputy leadership (which she eventually won) on 4 July "in good faith," had registered the monies with the Electoral Commission and the Register of Members Interests, and she "was not aware of any funding arrangements ... between David Abrahams and Janet Kidd". Baroness Jay of Paddington, who was working on the deputy leadership team of Hilary Benn, questioned and turned down a donation of £5,000 offered by Mrs Kidd; but it was subsequently accepted by Benn's team when made under the name of Mr Abrahams. Kidd offered a similar "donation" to the leadership campaign of Gordon Brown, but was turned down as she was not a known donor.

On 3 December 2007 Peter Hain, on BBC Radio, admitted that some donations to his own Labour deputy leadership campaign "were not registered as they should have been".

At the time of Abrahams's attempted offer of £5,000 towards Hilary Benn's campaign for the office of Deputy Prime Minister, and his successful donation of £5,000 to Harriet Harman who was campaigning for the same position, Abrahams was in the midst of protracted negotiations concerning a development he was proposing close to the A1. After initial proposals had been rejected by the Highways Agency, Abrahams made his donations, and resubmitted plans which were duly accepted the second time round. The Highways Agency was overseen by the Department for Transport which at that time was headed by the Office of the Deputy Prime Minister.

Jon Mendelsohn, Brown's chief fund-raiser, admitted that he had known since September about the arrangement, but claimed that he disapproved. Abrahams contends that Mendelsohn had known since April, and had encouraged the process. Mendelsohn denies this.

== Resignation of Peter Watt ==
The General Secretary of the Labour Party, Peter Watt, resigned on 26 November, after saying he took full responsibility. In his monthly press conference on 27 November, Prime Minister Gordon Brown said donations to the Labour Party by Abrahams through intermediaries were "completely unacceptable" and would be repaid. The Electoral Commission is seeking to investigate under the Political Parties, Elections and Referendums Act 2000 why they were given wrong names and what checks Labour made into its "donors", and called in the Crown Prosecution Service for briefings and advice.

In December 2007, the Metropolitan Police wrote to the Labour Party saying that "the donated money was no longer an issue for the police". Mr Abrahams and his middlemen were also cleared of any wrongdoing. It was also discovered that the £630,000 donated had not been returned to Mr Abrahams, although Harriet Harman had returned the £5,000 donated to her.

== Resignation of Wendy Alexander ==
On 28 June 2008, Wendy Alexander announced her resignation as Leader of the Scottish Labour Party, due to pressure on her following the donation scandal. She said it was with "deep regret" that she was resigning following the decision of the Scottish Parliament's standards committee. She had come under pressure after breaking donation rules and faces a one-day ban from parliament. In her resignation statement, she claimed the breach of the rules was made in "good faith" and the decision of the committee was "partisan" but she respected parliamentary process.

== Political repercussions ==
Donorgate meant that Gordon Brown's government was involved in an early scandal, and only a few months after the Cash for Peerages imbroglio which had beset Blair. There was heavy criticism from opposition parties, which includes calls for Harman's resignation. Conservative leader David Cameron questioned Brown's integrity during Prime Minister's Question Time and Liberal Democrat leadership contender Chris Huhne asked police to get involved, in particular as regards the planning permissions granted to Abrahams.

== See also ==
Political funding in the United Kingdom
