= Richard T. Windle =

British political activist

Richard Thomas Windle CBE (1888 – 3 September 1951) was a British political organiser, who held leading roles in the Labour Party.

Born in Bermondsey, Windle became a socialist, and in 1906 he joined the Social Democratic Federation. He did not play a leading role in the party, but instead came to join the Labour Party. In 1919, he became a full-time election agent for the party, based in Walthamstow, and then in 1921 he was appointed as the party's first full-time London District Organiser. He proved successful in the role, and in 1929 moved to the party's headquarters, as assistant national agent, working under George Shepherd.

Windle played a large role in the Labour Party's successful campaign in the 1945 UK general election. Shepherd retired the following year, and Windle succeeded him as National Agent. That year, he joined the Anglo-American election observers for the 1946 Greek referendum, and returned to the country in 1947 as the British representative on the United Nations Balkan Commission.

In 1947, Windle was made a Commander of the Order of the British Empire. Two years later, he took his first sick day in 28 years, and was admitted to hospital. He spent much of the next two years there, although he was able to deal with some paperwork while an inpatient. He died in September 1951.

Party political offices
Preceded by New position	London Labour Party District Organiser; 1921–1929	Succeeded by Hinley Atkinson
Preceded by George Shepherd	Labour Party Assistant National Agent; 1929–1946	Succeeded by Leonard Williams
Preceded by George Shepherd	Labour Party National Agent; 1946–1951	Succeeded by Leonard Williams
