= Mary Sutherland (political administrator) =

Mary Elizabeth Sutherland (30 November 1895 in Burnhead, Banchory-Ternan, Aberdeenshire – 19 October 1972 in East Kilbride) was a Scottish feminist and labour activist.

== Life ==
Born in Aberdeenshire, Sutherland joined the Independent Labour Party (ILP) while she was at secondary school. Her mother died when she was sixteen, and she brought up her siblings; however, she won a scholarship to the University of Aberdeen and graduated in history in 1917. She taught at Aberdeen Girls' High School and became active in the labour movement, campaigning for a minimum wage.

Sutherland took a succession of political administration posts, including being an organiser for the Scottish Farm Servants' Union from 1920 to 1922, a sub-editor on Forward, the Glasgow ILP newspaper, and then from 1924, being Scottish Women's Organiser for the Labour Party.

When the ILP left the Labour Party in 1931, Sutherland remained a member, and in 1932 she was promoted to Chief Women's Officer for the party and moved to London. From 1947 to 1952, she was the British representative to the United Nations Commission on the Status of Women, and she was also secretary of the Standing Joint Committee of Industrial Women's Organisations.

She was friends with the Nigerian activist Folayegbe Akintunde-Ighodalo. She retired from her Labour Party post in 1960, but remained active in other roles, including secretary of the Houseworker Trust.

Party political offices
| Preceded by Agnes Hardie | Labour Party Scottish Women's Organiser; 1924–1932 | Succeeded by Agnes Lauder |
| Preceded by Marion Phillips | Labour Party Chief Women's Officer; 1932–1960 | Succeeded by Sara Barker |
