= Minister for Women and Equalities =

Ministerial role in the British Government

- Royal Arms of His Majesty's Government

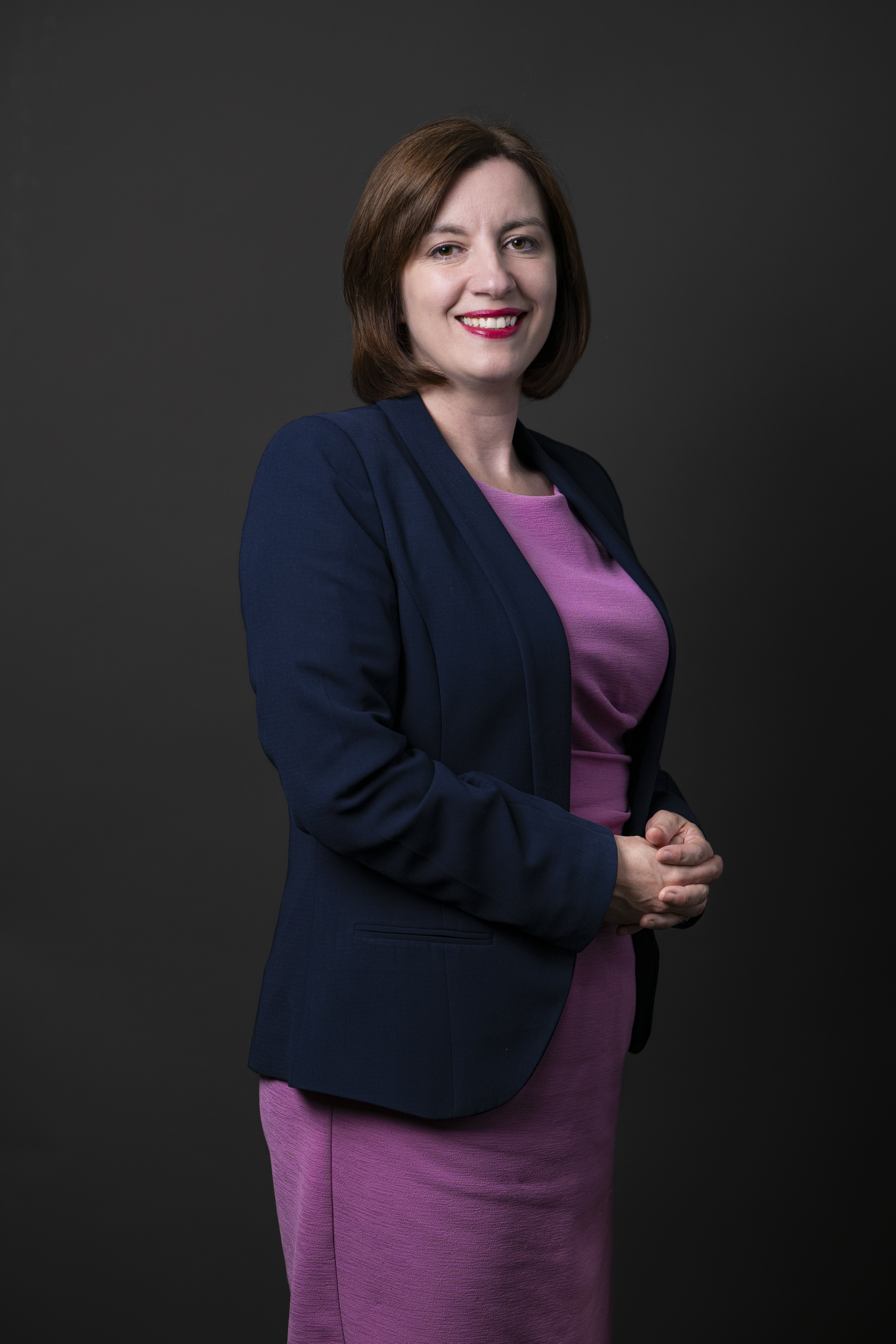
- Incumbent; Bridget Phillipson since 5 July 2024
- Ministry for Housing, Communities and Local Government; Office for Equality and Opportunity
- Style: Equalities Minister (informal); The Right Honourable (within the UK and Commonwealth)
- Type: Minister of the Crown
- Member of: Cabinet; Privy Council
- Reports to: The Prime Minister
- Seat: Westminster
- Nominator: The Prime Minister
- Appointer: The Monarch; (on the advice of the Prime Minister)
- Term length: At His Majesty's Pleasure
- Inaugural holder: Harriet Harman
- Formation: 3 May 1997; 29 years ago (as Minister for Women)
- Deputy: Minister of State (Minister for Equalities)
- Salary: £159,038 per annum (2022) (including £86,584 MP salary)
- Website: gov.uk/government/ministers/minister-for-women-and-equalities--3

Minister for Women and Equalities is a ministerial position in the United Kingdom currently based in the Ministry of Housing, Communities and Local Government. The minister leads the Office for Equality and Opportunity (formerly known as Government Equalities Office) which is part of the same department. Its counterpart in the shadow cabinet is the shadow minister for women and equalities.

The position has also been known as Minister for Women, Minister for Women and Equality and Minister for Equalities.

== History ==
The position of Minister for Women was created by Tony Blair when he became prime minister as a means of prioritising women's issues across government. Prior to that, there had been an equality unit in the Cabinet Office and a Cabinet committee, which were continued under the leadership of the new minister. When Gordon Brown succeeded Blair, he created the post of Minister for Women and Equality to handle a wider range of equalities issues. The first Minister for Women and, ten years later, the first Minister for Women and Equality was Harriet Harman. When David Cameron became prime minister, he renamed the position to Minister for Women and Equalities without a change in its responsibilities.

In April 2014 (after the resignation of Maria Miller), Nicky Morgan was initially appointed to the role of Minister for Women in conjunction with being Financial Secretary to the Treasury, attending Cabinet. Sajid Javid who had replaced Miller as Secretary of State for Culture, Media and Sport was appointed to the separate role of Minister for Equalities. While the Women and Equalities briefs were recombined in July 2014, the responsibility for marriage equality was assigned to Nick Boles, who held the title of Minister of State for Skills, Enterprise and Equalities and had a base in both the Education and Business departments. Both splits in responsibilities were due to Nicky Morgan having voted against the legalisation of equal marriage.

The two most recent female Prime Ministers, Theresa May and Liz Truss, served in this position.

In October 2024, the Office was renamed the Office for Equality and Opportunity.

The Minister for Women and Equalities and predecessor cabinet ministers since 1997 have been supported by one or more ministers of state or parliamentary under-secretaries of state. Until July 2026, the women and equalities ministerial team were typically all appointed to the department that the Minister for Women and Equalities led by virtue of their other Cabinet appointment. Since July 2026, all women and equalities ministers have been appointed to the Ministry of Housing, Communities and Local Government.

The Minister for Women and Equalities and their ministerial team are typically all concurrently appointed to another ministerial role, often in another department. For example, in February 2020, Kemi Badenoch was appointed Exchequer Secretary to the Treasury in HM Treasury and Parliamentary Under Secretary of State (Minister for Equalities) in the Department for International Trade (under Liz Truss as Minister for Women and Equalities and Secretary of State for International Trade).

Prior to 2026, the Minister for Women and Equalities position had always been held by a minister sitting in Cabinet by virtue of another office (i.e., a Secretary of State or Leader of one of the Houses of Parliament), but since the start of the Burnham ministry has been an office of Cabinet rank in its own right.

Bridget Phillipson has been Minister for Women and Equalities since July 2024. She has concurrently held the non-ministerial role of Chair of the Labour Party since July 2026.

== List of ministers ==
=== Minister for Women ===
| Cabinet minister | Term of office | | Junior ministers | | Political party | Ministry |
|---|---|---|---|---|---|---|
| Harriet Harman; MP for Camberwell and Peckham; Secretary of State for Social Security | 3 May 1997 | 27 July 1998 | Joan Ruddock | | Labour | Blair (I) |
| Margaret Jay, Baroness Jay of Paddington; Life peer Leader of the House of Lords | 27 July 1998 | 8 June 2001 | Tessa Jowell | | Labour | Blair (I) |
| Patricia Hewitt; MP for Leicester West; Secretary of State for Trade and Industry | 8 June 2001 | 5 May 2005 | Barbara Roche (with Morgan until November 2001) | Baroness Morgan of Huyton (until November 2001) | Labour | Blair (II) |
| Patricia Hewitt; MP for Leicester West; Secretary of State for Trade and Industry | 8 June 2001 | 5 May 2005 | Barbara Roche (November 2001 – June 2003); Jacqui Smith (from June 2003) | | Labour | Blair (II) |
| Tessa Jowell; MP for Dulwich and West Norwood; Secretary of State for Culture, Media and Sport and Minister for the Olympics | 5 May 2005 | 5 May 2006 | Meg Munn | | Labour | Blair (III) |
| Ruth Kelly; MP for Bolton West; Secretary of State for Communities and Local Government | 5 May 2006 | 28 June 2007 | Meg Munn | | Labour | Blair (III) |
| === Minister for Women and Equality === | | | | | Labour | |
| Cabinet minister | Term of office | | Junior ministers | | Political party | Ministry |
| Harriet Harman; MP for Camberwell and Peckham; Leader of the House of Commons | 28 June 2007 | 11 May 2010 | Barbara Follett (October 2007 – October 2008); Maria Eagle (October 2008 – June 2009) | | Labour | Brown |
| Harriet Harman; MP for Camberwell and Peckham; Leader of the House of Commons | 28 June 2007 | 11 May 2010 | Maria Eagle (with Foster from June 2009) | Michael Foster (from June 2009) | Labour | Brown |
=== Minister for Women and Equalities ===
| Cabinet minister | Term of office | | Junior ministers | | Political party | Ministry |
| Theresa May; MP for Maidenhead; Home Secretary | 12 May 2010 | 4 September 2012 | Lynne Featherstone | | Coalition (Con–LD) | Cameron-Clegg |
| Maria Miller; MP for Basingstoke; Secretary of State for Culture, Media and Sport | 4 September 2012 | 9 April 2014 | Jo Swinson | Helen Grant | Coalition (Con–LD) | Cameron-Clegg |
=== Minister for Women and Minister for Equalities ===
| Cabinet ministers | Term of office | | Junior ministers | | Political party | Ministry |
| Women: Nicky Morgan; MP for Loughborough; Financial Secretary to the Treasury (attending Cabinet) | 9 April 2014 | 15 July 2014 | Jo Swinson | Helen Grant | Coalition (Con–LD) | Cameron-Clegg |
| Equalities: Sajid Javid; MP for Bromsgrove; Secretary of State for Culture, Media and Sport | 9 April 2014 | 15 July 2014 | Jo Swinson | Helen Grant | Coalition (Con–LD) | Cameron-Clegg |
=== Minister for Women and Equalities ===
| Cabinet minister | Term of office | | Junior ministers | | Political party | Ministry |
| Nicky Morgan; MP for Loughborough; Secretary of State for Education | 15 July 2014 | 14 July 2016 | Jo Swinson | Helen Grant | Coalition (Con–LD) | Cameron-Clegg |
| Nicky Morgan; MP for Loughborough; Secretary of State for Education | 15 July 2014 | 14 July 2016 | Caroline Dinenage | | Conservative | Cameron (II) |
| Justine Greening; MP for Putney; Secretary of State for Education | 14 July 2016 | 8 January 2018 | Caroline Dinenage | | Conservative | May (I) |
| Justine Greening; MP for Putney; Secretary of State for Education | 14 July 2016 | 8 January 2018 | Women: Anne Milton | Equalities: Nick Gibb | Conservative | May (II) |
| Amber Rudd; MP for Hastings and Rye; Home Secretary | 9 January 2018 | 30 April 2018 | Women: Victoria Atkins (until February 2020) | Equalities: Baroness Williams of Trafford (until February 2020) | Conservative | May (II) |
| Penny Mordaunt; MP for Portsmouth North; Secretary of State for International Development until May 2019, then Secretary of State for Defence | 30 April 2018 | 24 July 2019 | Women: Victoria Atkins (until February 2020) | Equalities: Baroness Williams of Trafford (until February 2020) | Conservative | May (II) |
| Amber Rudd; MP for Hastings and Rye; Secretary of State for Work and Pensions | 24 July 2019 | 7 September 2019 | Women: Victoria Atkins (until February 2020) | Equalities: Baroness Williams of Trafford (until February 2020) | Conservative | Johnson (I) |
| Liz Truss; MP for South West Norfolk; Secretary of State for International Trade until September 2021, then Foreign Secretary | 10 September 2019 | 6 September 2022 | Women: Victoria Atkins (until February 2020) | Equalities: Baroness Williams of Trafford (until February 2020) | Conservative | Johnson (I) |
| Liz Truss; MP for South West Norfolk; Secretary of State for International Trade until September 2021, then Foreign Secretary | 10 September 2019 | 6 September 2022 | Women: Victoria Atkins (until February 2020) | Equalities: Baroness Williams of Trafford (until February 2020) | Conservative | Johnson (II) |
| Liz Truss; MP for South West Norfolk; Secretary of State for International Trade until September 2021, then Foreign Secretary | 10 September 2019 | 6 September 2022 | Women: Baroness Berridge (February 2020 – September 2021); Baroness Stedman-Scott (from September 2021) | Equalities: Kemi Badenoch (February 2020 – July 2022); Mike Freer (September 2021 – July 2022); Amanda Solloway (from July 2022) | Conservative | Johnson (II) |
=== Minister for Equalities ===
| Cabinet minister | Term of office | | Junior ministers | | Political party | Ministry |
| Nadhim Zahawi; MP for Stratford-on-Avon; Chancellor of the Duchy of Lancaster and Minister for Intergovernmental Relations | 6 September 2022 | 25 October 2022 | Women: Katherine Fletcher | Equalities: Baroness Stedman-Scott | Conservative | Truss |
=== Minister for Women and Equalities ===
| Cabinet minister | Term of office | | Junior ministers | | Political party | Ministry |
| Kemi Badenoch; MP for Saffron Walden; Secretary of State for International Trade until February 2023, then Secretary of State for Business and Trade | 25 October 2022 | 5 July 2024 | Women: Maria Caulfield | Equalities: Stuart Andrew | Conservative | Sunak |
| Bridget Phillipson; MP for Houghton and Sunderland South; Secretary of State for Education until July 2026; Chair of the Labour Party from July 2026 | 8 July 2024 | Incumbent | Gender policy: Anneliese Dodds (July 2024 – February 2025); Baroness Smith of Malvern (March 2025 – July 2026) | Race and ethnicity policy: Seema Malhotra (October 2024 – July 2026) | Labour | Starmer |
| Bridget Phillipson; MP for Houghton and Sunderland South; Secretary of State for Education until July 2026; Chair of the Labour Party from July 2026 | 8 July 2024 | Incumbent | Disability policy: Sir Stephen Timms (July 2024 – July 2026) | LGBT+ policy: Dame Nia Griffith (October 2024 – September 2025); Olivia Bailey (September 2025 – July 2026) | Labour | Starmer |
| Bridget Phillipson; MP for Houghton and Sunderland South; Secretary of State for Education until July 2026; Chair of the Labour Party from July 2026 | 8 July 2024 | Incumbent | Sir Stephen Timms (from July 2026) | Lord Collins of Highbury (from July 2026) | Labour | Burnham |
| Bridget Phillipson; MP for Houghton and Sunderland South; Secretary of State for Education until July 2026; Chair of the Labour Party from July 2026 | 8 July 2024 | Incumbent | Sir Stephen Timms (from July 2026) | Satvir Kaur (from July 2026) | Labour | Burnham |
| Bridget Phillipson; MP for Houghton and Sunderland South; Secretary of State for Education until July 2026; Chair of the Labour Party from July 2026 | 8 July 2024 | Incumbent | Sir Stephen Timms (from July 2026) | Simon Lightwood (from July 2026) | Labour | Burnham |

== See also ==
- Office for Equality and Opportunity
- Women and Equalities Committee
