= Jennie Formby =

Former General Secretary of the Labour Party

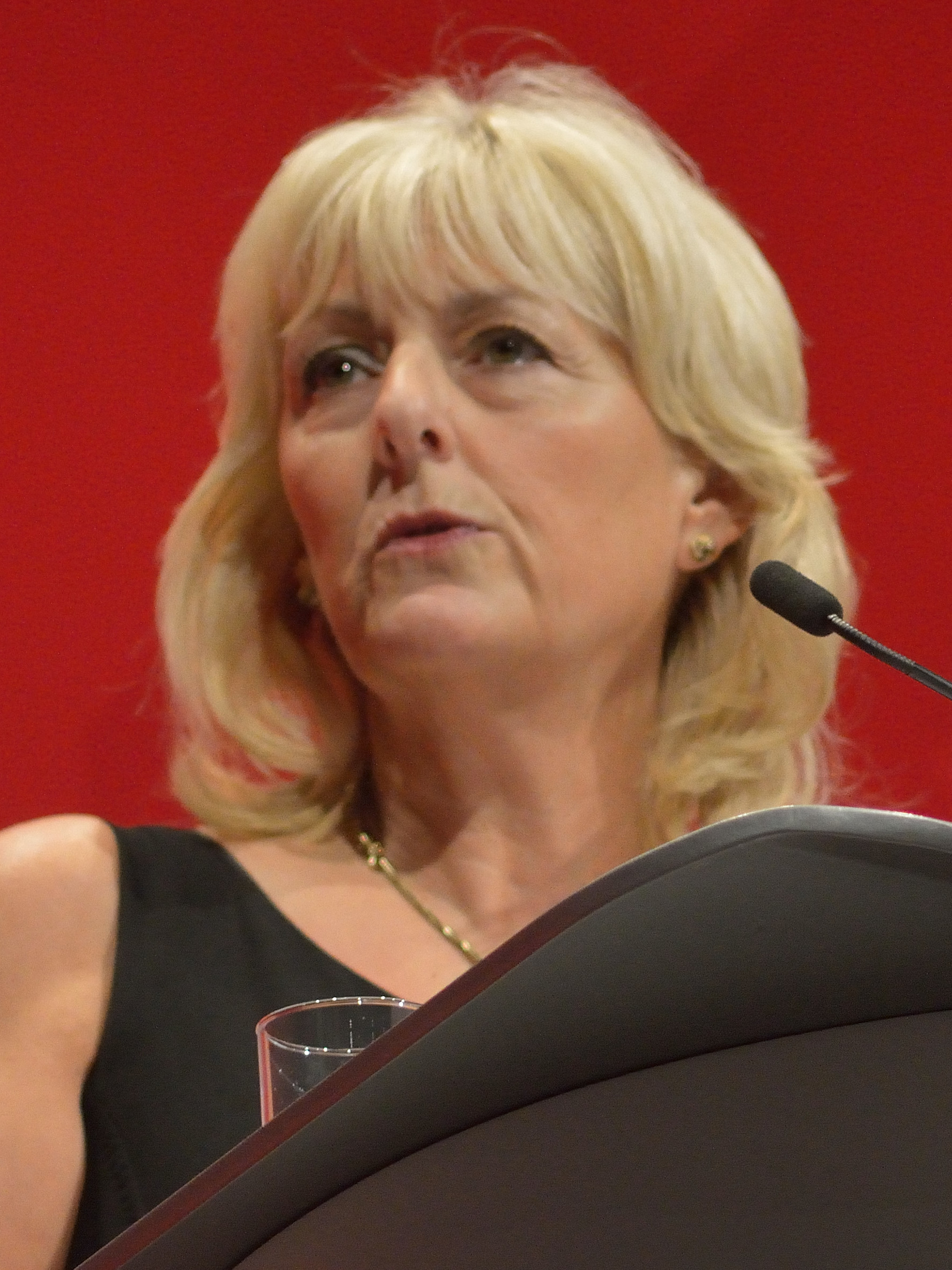
- Formby in 2016

General Secretary of the Labour Party
- In office 3 April 2018 – 26 May 2020
- Leader: Jeremy Corbyn; Keir Starmer
- Preceded by: Iain McNicol
- Succeeded by: David Evans

Personal details
- Born: Jennifer Sandle; 12 April 1960 (age 66) London, England
- Party: Green Party of England and Wales (since 2026)
- Other political affiliations: Labour (until 2024); Independent (2024–2026)
- Spouse: Freddie Formby (m. 2000)
- Children: 3
- Education: Bath High School for Girls; St Helen and St Katharine

Jennifer Formby (née Sandle; born 12 April 1960) is a British trade unionist and political figure who served as General Secretary of the Labour Party from 2018 to 2020. She was previously political director and south-east England regional secretary for Unite the Union.

== Early life ==
Born Jennifer Sandle in London, her father served in the Royal Navy in Korea, Suez and Lebanon. She grew up with an older brother and sister in Malta, Bath and Salisbury. She went to Bath High School for Girls then St Helen and St Katharine boarding school in Abingdon, paid for by the Royal Navy from the age of 14. Formby left school with 10 O levels and 3 A levels, but chose not to go to university.

== Trade unionism ==
Formby became a trade unionist when she began her working life in Salisbury at the bookmakers William Hill in the late 1970s, and became a branch secretary in Unite's predecessor, the Transport and General Workers' Union. She later worked for BOC in Southampton, where she became a union shop steward.

Formby became a Transport and General Workers' Union regional officer in 1988. She represented a Southampton University Hospitals NHS Trust nurse in a ground-breaking employment tribunal case in 2004, where the black nurse suffered racial discrimination by being banned from caring for a white baby. Formby became the union's national officer for the food, drink and tobacco sector in 2004. In 2013, she was appointed Unite's political director. In March 2016, Formby moved to the post of regional secretary in south-east England.

== Politics ==
Since late 2011, Formby had been a member of the National Executive Committee (NEC) of the Labour Party.

In February 2018, Formby announced she was a candidate to become General Secretary of the Labour Party, shortly after the incumbent, Iain McNicol, resigned. Her main rival, Jon Lansman, the chair of Momentum, dropped out of contention on 11 March, making Formby the frontrunner.

On 20 March 2018, she was appointed to the role, effective from April 2018.

She resigned on 4 May 2020, a month following the election of Keir Starmer as new Labour leader, saying "now we have a new leadership team it is the right time to step down". She was succeeded by David Evans.

In June 2024, Formby publicly stated that she would be voting for the Green Party in the 2024 UK general election.

In April 2026, Formby announced she had joined the Green Party four months earlier.

== Personal life ==
Formby and Len McCluskey had a child in 1991. She married Freddie Formby in 2000 and the couple had two children together and adopted a third.

In March 2019, Formby announced that she was to undergo treatment for breast cancer.

Party political offices
| Preceded by Iain McNicol | General Secretary of the Labour Party; 2018-2020 | Succeeded by David Evans |
