= Joe Fortune (activist) =

Joe Fortune (born 1981 or 1982) is an English political activist who is the current General Secretary of the Labour Party.

Born in Liverpool to a family with Irish roots, Fortune joined the Labour Party when he was 15. He studied politics at the University of Leeds, then moved to London where he worked in a variety of political and public affairs posts. In 2009, he began working for the Co-operative Party, which is allied with the Labour Party. He rose to become national political and policy manager in 2016, and then general secretary in 2019. Under his leadership, the party increased both its membership and its elected representation.

In September 2026, Fortune was appointed as General Secretary of the Labour Party, with the support of Andy Burnham.

Party political offices
Preceded by Claire McCarthy	General Secretary of the Co-operative Party; 2019–2026	Succeeded by Jim Robbins
Preceded by Hollie Ridley	General Secretary of the Labour Party; 2026–present	Succeeded by Incumbent
