= Nigel Owens =

Welsh international rugby union referee

Nigel Owens MBE
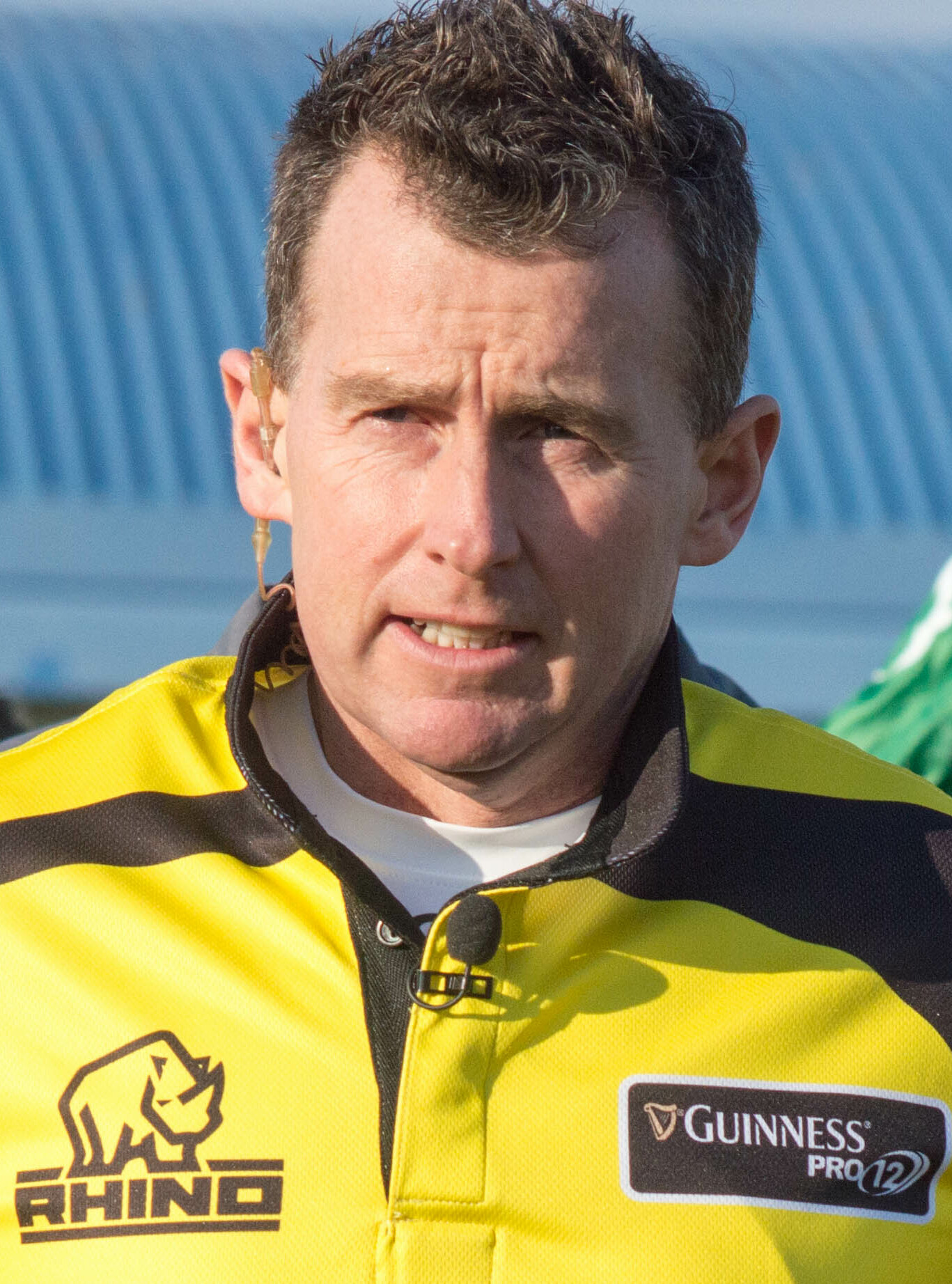
- Owens officiating a 2016 United Rugby Championship match
- Born: Nigel Owens; 18 June 1971 (age 55) Mynyddcerrig, Carmarthenshire, Wales
- Occupation(s): Farmer, rugby union referee, match commentator

Rugby union career
Refereeing career
Years	Competition	Apps
2001–2020	Challenge Cup	9
2002–2020	Heineken/Champions Cup	98
2002–2020	Pro14	149
2003–2020	Test matches	100
2007–2019	Rugby World Cup	
2015	RWC finals	1
2019	RWC finals	3
- Correct as of 19 October 2019

Nigel Owens, MBE (born 18 June 1971) is a Welsh former international rugby union referee, who retired in December 2020 after a 23-year career. He previously held the world record for the most test matches refereed and was one of five international referees listed as professional within the Welsh Rugby Union, along with Craig Evans, Adam Jones, Dan Jones and Ben Whitehouse. He is widely considered to have been one of the greatest rugby referees of all time.

Owens is also known as a television personality, as one of the presenters of the S4C Welsh language chat shows Jonathan and Bwrw'r Bar ('Hitting the Bar'). Owens also hosts his own quiz programme Munud i Fynd ('A Minute to Go'). At the 2011 Eisteddfod Genelaethol, he was made a member of the Gorsedd Cymru.

== Early life ==
Owens was born and raised in the village of Mynyddcerrig, near Cross Hands in Carmarthenshire, Wales. He is a fluent Welsh speaker. He was a school technician at Ysgol Gyfun Maes-yr-Yrfa in Llanelli, the same school attended by Welsh international Dwayne Peel, and was a youth worker with Menter Cwm Gwendraeth. Before that he worked on a farm, for over a year, as a farmhand.

== Refereeing career ==
Owens started refereeing in 1987, after his sports teacher John Beynon suggested he take up refereeing after a school game. His first game was an under-15s match between Carmarthen and Pembrokeshire at the age of 16.

Owens made his European debut during the 2000–01 European Challenge Cup season, refereeing London Irish and Piacenza on 21 January 2001. In October 2001, Owens was one of the first three Welsh Rugby Union professional referees. He made his debut in Europe's Heineken Cup, refereeing Calvisano and Perpignan, on 12 January 2002. Owens made his Celtic League debut on 30 August 2002, refereeing Border Reivers and Connacht.

Owens was a regular referee on the International Rugby Board World Sevens Series circuit between 2002 and 2005. On 16 February 2003, Owens had his first 15-a-side international appointment, refereeing the second-tier match Portugal v Georgia during the 2003–04 European Nations Cup First Division. In 2005, Owens earned his first International Rugby Board appointment, when he was appointed to the first test of the Irish tour of Japan in Osaka. During the 2005/06 season, Owens became a regular appointment at both Celtic League and Heineken Cup level, making six appearances during the 2005–06 Heineken Cup.

Owens was appointed to his first play-off/knock-out rugby match on 23 April 2006, when he refereed the 2005–06 European Challenge Cup semi-final between Newcastle Falcons and London Irish. During the 2006–07 European Challenge Cup, he refereed a semi-final and the final. He also refereed the 2006–07 Heineken Cup quarter-final between London Wasps and Leinster on 31 March 2007. That same year, he refereed his first Six Nations Championship game, England v Italy, and his first Tri Nations game, New Zealand v Australia. On 11 September 2007, Owens made his Rugby World Cup debut in the match between Argentina and Georgia in Lyon, France. He was the only Welsh referee during the 2007 Rugby World Cup, where he refereed three pool-stage matches.

Owens refereed in all six rounds of the 2007–08 Heineken Cup pool stage and was appointed to a quarter-final, semi-final and the final, becoming the third Welsh referee to referee a Heineken Cup final. The following year he refereed nine games, including a quarter-final (the infamous Bloodgate game), semi-final and the final, becoming the third referee to referee a Heineken Cup final more than once and the second to referee two consecutive Heineken Cup finals. On 16 June 2009, as part of the 2009 British & Irish Lions tour to South Africa, Owens refereed the match between the Lions and the Southern Kings.

During the 2010/11 season, Owens was appointed to three play-off/knock-out matches; 2010–11 Heineken Cup quarter-final, 2010–11 European Challenge Cup semi-final and the 2011 Celtic League Grand Final. He later officiated at the 2011 Rugby World Cup, which included an appointment to a quarter-final match, New Zealand v Argentina. He was also appointed to the 2011 Rugby World Cup final as one of the assistant referees.

Owens refereed his third Heineken Cup final at the 2012 Heineken Cup final between Leinster and Ulster.

In 2013, Owens refereed his 100th Pro12 game and became the most-appointed Welsh referee at international level, overtaking Derek Bevan. During the 2014–15 European Rugby Champions Cup he became the most-appointed referee at European Rugby Champions Cup/Heineken Cup level with 80 appointments, overtaking Alain Rolland. He also officiated at that season's final between Clermont and Toulon, before refereeing the 2015 Pro12 Grand Final. The 2015 Pro12 final was his third time refereeing the Pro12 final, having refereed the 2011 and 2014 Pro12 Grand Final.

Owens was on the 12-man referee panel for the 2015 Rugby World Cup where he was appointed to three pool stage matches, including the France v Ireland clash at the Millennium Stadium, which was the first time Owens refereed an international match at the Welsh home stadium. Owens refereed two more World Cup tests, one of which was the 2015 Rugby World Cup final between New Zealand and Australia. He became the second Welsh referee to referee a World Cup final, after Derek Bevan took charge of the 1991 Rugby World Cup final. Owens won the World Rugby Referee Award at the 2015 World Rugby Awards.

On 3 November 2015, he announced that he intended to keep refereeing international rugby for another four years.

On 5 March 2016, Owens launched the 2019 Rugby World Cup qualifying process, refereeing the first qualification match, Saint Vincent and the Grenadines v Jamaica in Arnos Vale. Later that year, Owens became the most-capped rugby referee when he took charge of the Fiji-Tonga clash in Suva, overtaking Jonathan Kaplan's record of 70 tests.

On 15 April 2017, Owens made his 150th Pro12 appearance when he took charge of the Judgement Day clash between Newport Gwent Dragons and Scarlets. On 28 November 2020, Owens refereed his 100th international match in the Autumn Nations Cup game between France and Italy, becoming the first referee to reach the landmark. Two weeks later, he announced his immediate retirement from international duty, saying "Nobody has a divine right to go on forever," but expressed a desire to continue refereeing club matches in the Pro14 and at club level in Wales.

== Outside rugby ==
Owens is one of the presenters of the S4C Welsh language chat shows Jonathan and Bwrw'r Bar ("Hitting the Bar"). Owens also hosts his own quiz programme Munud i Fynd ("A Minute to Go").

Owens has a cattle farm in his home village, Mynyddcerrig. In January 2021, he was featured on the BBC agricultural programme Countryfile.

His autobiography, Hanner Amser ("Half Time"), was published in Welsh in 2008, then in English in 2009. On 24 July 2017, Owens presented a Panorama documentary about men and eating disorders. In it, he opened up about his own experiences with bulimia and how it has affected his life, highlighting his refereeing of the Rugby World Cup as a significant trigger.

In February 2017, Owens was the castaway on BBC Radio 4's Desert Island Discs, during which he discussed his sexuality with presenter Kirsty Young.

On 25 March 2021 Owens was a panellist on BBC's Question Time. When asked about the flying of the Union Jack on public buildings, he said that the flag "should not be mandated on anybody" and suggested "if you force issues on people then you are going to have people rebel against it."

In February 2022, Owens was named as a commentator for S4C in the 2022 Six Nations Championship.

Owens appears in the mid-morning BBC Radio 5 Live programme by Scott Mills and Chris Stark. In "Real Life TMO", he referees on domestic and trivial arguments presented by listeners.

== Personal life ==
In May 2007, Owens publicly came out as gay in an interview with Wales on Sunday. Reaction was mostly supportive. Owens said that coming out was a difficult decision, and that he had contemplated suicide when he was 26.

It's such a big taboo to be gay in my line of work, I had to think very hard about it because I didn't want to jeopardise my career. Coming out was very difficult and I tried to live with who I really was for years. I knew I was 'different' from my late teens, but I was just living a lie.

Shortly after the 2007 Rugby World Cup, Owens was named 'Gay Sports Personality of the Year' at gay rights group Stonewall's awards ceremony in London. He was a patron of the LGBTQ Centre of Excellence Wales, until its disbandment in late 2012, but he is still patron of the Wooden Spoon Society rugby charity. In 2013 Owens became a patron of Bullies Out charity in Wales. Owens was subjected to racist and anti-gay abuse when refereeing England and New Zealand in November 2014, according to a letter in The Guardian. This was reported by a fan and resulted in the two spectators responsible being banned from Twickenham for two years. In 2015, Owens was named 'Gay Sports Personality of the Decade' at Stonewall awards ceremony in London. He was named on the 2017 Pinc List of leading Welsh LGBT figures. In a 2019 interview with Wales Online, he admitted he once ordered a date to hide in the toilets at Pizza Hut when Wales international Dwayne Peel and his girlfriend walked in. In Dublin, for the launch of Europe's largest LGBT+ inclusive rugby tournament, Owens was speaking about his own experiences and the difficulty of coming out as gay while working in sport.

In 2011 he was made a member of the Gorsedd of Bards. In the 2016 Birthday Honours, Owens was appointed a Member of the Order of the British Empire (MBE) for services to sport, and was awarded an honorary fellowship from Cardiff University in July of the same year. Owens has served as secretary, chairman and president of the Wales Federation of Young Farmers Clubs and is a fan of Wrexham Football Club. In July 2024, Owens was awarded an Honorary Doctorate in Health (DHealth) by the University of Bath. The award recognises his 'outstanding services to rugby, and for his openness and candour in helping [...] others with mental and other health issues'.

His long-term partner is Barrie Jones-Davies, a primary school teacher from Llandovery. In October 2019, Jones-Davies joined Owens in Tokyo to support him during the Rugby World Cup and they married 10 August 2024.

== See also ==
- Rugby union match officials
