= Mynyddcerrig =

Village in Carmarthenshire, Wales

Coordinates: 51°48′04″N 4°09′43″W

- Location within Carmarthenshire
- OS grid reference: SN505005
- Community: Llanddarog
- Principal area: Carmarthenshire
- Preserved county: Dyfed
- Country: Wales
- Sovereign state: United Kingdom
- Post town: LLANELLI
- Postcode district: SA14, SA15
- Police: Dyfed-Powys
- Fire: Mid and West Wales
- Ambulance: Welsh
- UK Parliament: Llanelli
- Senedd Cymru – Welsh Parliament: Llanelli

Mynyddcerrig is a village in Carmarthenshire, Wales. Mynyddcerrig once had a primary school, Ysgol Mynyddcerrig, which closed in 2007. However, it still has a working men's club and a public park.

== Notable people ==
- Nigel Owens, Welsh rugby referee
- Bernard Dix, British trade unionist
