= Jim Mortimer =

British politician (1921–2013)

Personal details
- Born: 12 January 1921
- Died: 23 April 2013 (aged 92)

James Edward Mortimer (12 January 1921 – 23 April 2013) was a British trade unionist and the General Secretary of the Labour Party between 1982 and 1985.

== Early life and career ==
Mortimer's early career was in the shipbuilding and engineering industries, where he worked as a ship fitter apprentice, a machinist and a planning engineer. He studied as a TUC Scholar at Ruskin College, Oxford, in 1945 and 1946, and worked in the TUC's Economic Department from 1946 to 1948.

He was a trade union member of the National Board for Prices and Incomes between 1968 and 1971, and at the same time he was a Director of the London Co-operative Society. From 1971 to 1974 he was a member of the board of the London Transport Executive. He had been a national official of the Association of Engineering and Shipbuilding Draughtsmen. He was the first Chairman of Acas from 1974 until 1981.

== General Secretary of the Labour Party ==
Mortimer was General Secretary of the Labour Party between 1982 and 1985, a time of great turmoil in the Labour Party with the formation of the breakaway SDP and the rise of the Militant tendency. During the 1983 general election campaign, at the daily press conference on 26 May, Mortimer announced that "The unanimous view of the campaign committee is that Michael Foot is the leader of the Labour Party and speaks for the party". It later emerged that Foot's leadership had not been discussed, but created an impression that Foot needed a vote of confidence to continue. The press claimed this as an "own goal". Mortimer wrote about this in his autobiography "I do not regret, that at a time when there was an effort to undermine the leadership of Michael Foot, I made it clear that this effort found no sympathy in Walworth Road. 'Own goals' are more often than not the invention of journalistic chatter.".

He played an important role in the miners' strike of 1984 and 1985, throwing himself into support for the miners and being given honorary membership of the NUM in recognition of his efforts.

== Personal life ==
He wrote several books, including a three-volume history of the boilermakers' union and an autobiography, A Life on the Left. He had three children with Renee, his first wife: Hugh (born 1943), Jamie (born 1947), and Diana (born 1955). His second wife was Pat.

Trade union offices
Preceded by Jim Bradley	President of the National Federation of Professional Workers; 1960 – 1962	Succeeded by Laurence Welsh
Government offices
New office	Chair of Acas; 1974–1981	Succeeded by Pat Lowry
Party political offices
Preceded by Ron Hayward	General Secretary of the Labour Party; 1982–1985	Succeeded by Larry Whitty
