= Leonard Williams (politician) =

British politician (1904–1972)

Sir Leonard Williams GCMG

2nd Governor-General of Mauritius
- In office 3 September 1968 – 27 December 1972
- Monarch: Elizabeth II
- Prime Minister: Seewoosagur Ramgoolam
- Preceded by: Michel Rivalland (acting)
- Succeeded by: Raman Osman

Personal details
- Born: 22 January 1904
- Died: 27 December 1972 (aged 68)

Sir Arthur Leonard Williams GCMG (22 January 1904 – 27 December 1972) was a British politician who was General Secretary of the Labour Party during the 1960s.

== Early life ==
Born in Liverpool in 1904, he began working on the steam engines of the railway as a boy, doing the dirty jobs of cleaning out the ashes and the boilers on the engines. He became involved in the union movement after World War I, rising through various positions to attain the position of General Secretary of the British Labour Party. After retiring from that post he was knighted and appointed Governor-General of Mauritius in 1968 and served in that capacity until his death. He was also involved in the Scout movement.

He was married to Margaret Wiggins. There were no children of the marriage.

Party political offices
Preceded by Richard T. Windle	Labour Party Assistant National Agent; 1946–1951	Succeeded by Sara Barker
Preceded by Richard T. Windle	Labour Party National Agent; 1951–1962	Succeeded by Sara Barker
Preceded by Morgan Phillips	General Secretary of the Labour Party; 1962 – 1968	Succeeded by Harry Nicholas
Government offices
Preceded by Michel Rivalland; Acting	Governor-General of Mauritius; 1968 – 1972	Succeeded by Raman Osman
