= Tom Sawyer, Baron Sawyer =

British trade unionist (1943–2025)

The Right Honourable The Lord Sawyer
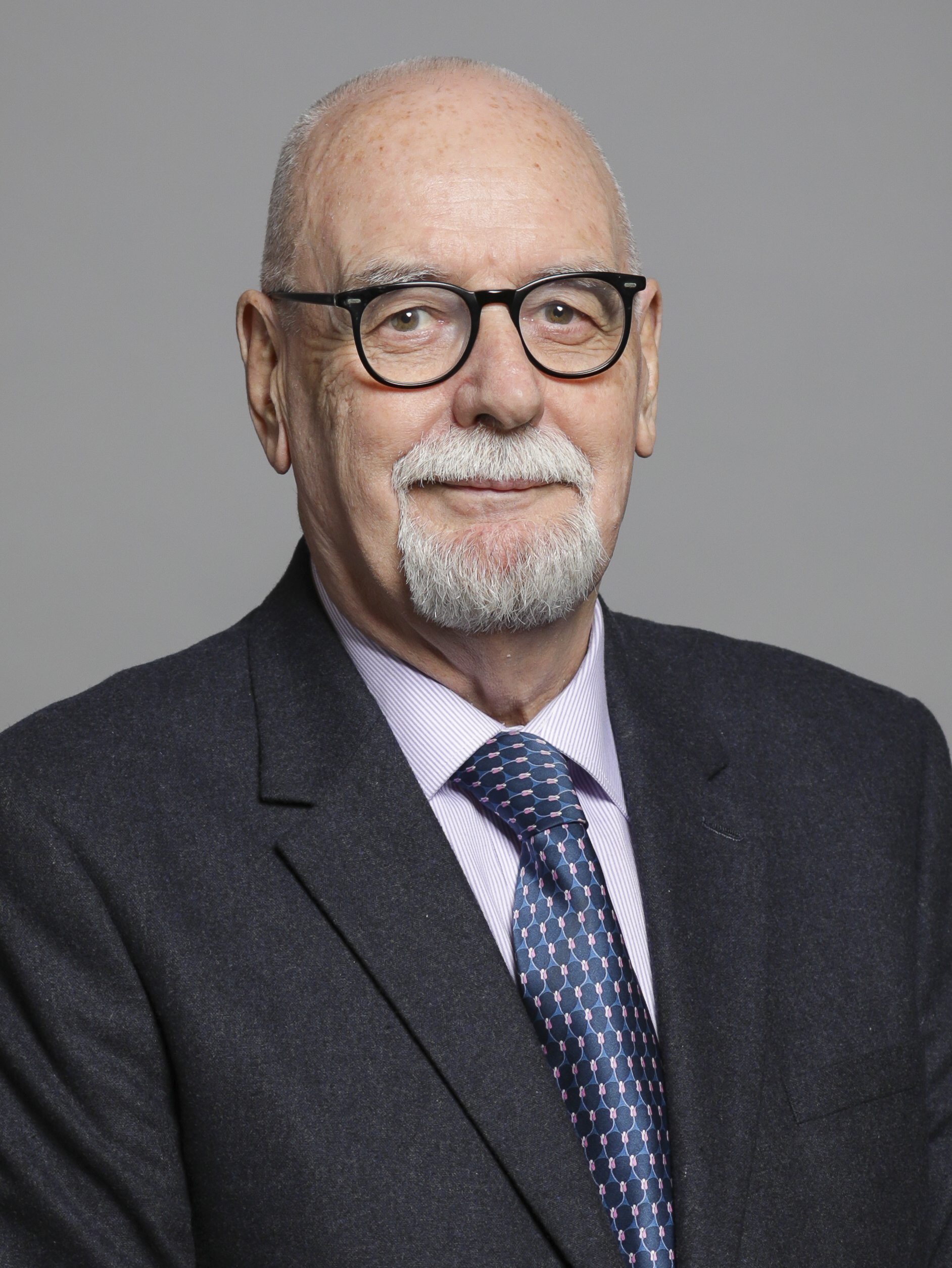
- Official portrait, 2019

General Secretary of the Labour Party
- In office 1994–1998
- Leader: Tony Blair
- Preceded by: Larry Whitty
- Succeeded by: Margaret McDonagh

Chairman of the National Executive Committee
- In office 1990–1991
- Leader: Neil Kinnock
- Preceded by: Jo Richardson
- Succeeded by: Tony Clarke

Member of the House of Lords
- Lord Temporal
- Life peerage 4 August 1998 – 3 August 2025

Personal details
- Born: 12 May 1943 Darlington, County Durham, England
- Died: 3 August 2025 (aged 82)
- Party: Labour
- Occupation: Trade union official

Lawrence Sawyer, Baron Sawyer (12 May 1943 – 3 August 2025), known as Tom Sawyer, was a British trade unionist and Labour Party politician. He was General Secretary of the Labour Party from 1994 to 1998.

== Early life ==
Sawyer was educated at Dodmire School, Eastbourne Comprehensive School and Darlington Technical College.

== Career ==
=== Trade unions ===
Aged fifteen, Sawyer went to work on the factory floor of a Durham engineering works. He became a National Union of Public Employees (NUPE) Officer in 1971, becoming their Northern Regional Officer in 1975. In 1981, he was made Deputy General Secretary of NUPE and served through its merger to become UNISON until 1994.

=== Labour Party ===
In his NUPE role he served as a National Executive Committee Member of the Labour Party between 1981 and 1994 and was elected to serve as its chair from 1990 to 1991.

In 1994, Sawyer became General Secretary of the Labour Party and led the Party successfully into the 1997 General Election. He was a moderniser who helped bring about the New Labour era. He stood down at the 1998 Party Conference and was created a Life Peer as Baron Sawyer, of Darlington in the County of Durham on 4 August 1998. He was later a director of several companies and public sector bodies.

The Labour History Archive and Study Centre at the People's History Museum in Manchester holds the papers of Sawyer, which range from 1985 to 1998.

=== Other positions ===
In 2005, Lord Sawyer became the chancellor of the University of Teesside, replacing former Conservative MP and member of the European Commission, Leon Brittan. Sawyer served in this role until 2017.

Sawyer was a life-long admirer of William Morris, the socialist writer and craftsman and in 2018 Sawyer began a five-year term of office as President of the William Morris Society.

== Death ==
Sawyer died on 3 August 2025, at the age of 82.

Party political offices
Preceded by Jo Richardson	Chair of the National Executive Committee of the Labour Party; 1990–1991	Succeeded by Tony Clarke
Preceded by Larry Whitty	General Secretary of the Labour Party; 1994–1998	Succeeded by Margaret McDonagh
Academic offices
Preceded by Leon Brittan	Chancellor of the University of Teesside; 2005–2017	Succeeded by Paul Drechsler
Trade union offices
Preceded by Bernard Dix	Deputy General Secretary of the National Union of Public Employees; 1981–1993	Succeeded by Position abolished
Preceded by New position	Deputy General Secretary of UNISON; 1993–1994; With: Colm O'Kane and Dave Prentis	Succeeded by Dave Prentis
