= Johannah Cutts =

British High Court judge

The Honourable Johannah Cutts
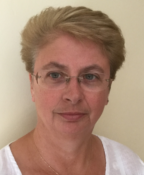

High Court Judge King's Bench Division
- Incumbent
- Assumed office 2018–present
- Monarchs: Elizabeth II; Charles III

Personal details
- Born: 13 January 1964 (age 62) Taplow, Buckinghamshire, England
- Education: The Chelmer Institute

Dame Johannah Cutts DBE, styled Ms Justice Cutts, is a British High Court Judge.

== Early life and education ==
Johannah Cutts was born in Taplow, Buckinghamshire on 13 January 1964. She was educated at St Helen and St Katharine's School in Abingdon-on-Thames and read Law at Anglia Ruskin University (formerly known as The Chelmer Institute).

== Legal career ==
Cutts was called to the Bar by Inner Temple in 1986 and practised initially at 23 Essex Street Chambers (now 23ES), and later at the London-based Foundry Chambers, formerly known as 9-12 Bell Yard. She specialised in criminal law, with a particular interest in cases involving vulnerable persons. While practising, Cutts developed best practices and procedures in the handling of serious sexual assault cases involving young or vulnerable victims. In 2005 she contributed to the 5th edition of Rook and Ward on Sexual Offences.

Cutts was appointed Queen's Counsel in 2008. She was appointed a Recorder in 2002, and later a Circuit Judge in 2011, sitting at Aylesbury and Reading Crown Courts.

In 2014 Cutts was appointed a Deputy High Court Judge and in October 2018 she became a Justice of the High Court and assigned to the King's Bench Division. Upon appointment to the High Court in 2018 she received the customary damehood (DBE) from Queen Elizabeth II.

== Notable cases ==
In December 2015, Cutts presided over a case involving Child Sexual Abuse. Despite the accused admitting to all 22 charges, including being in possession of 13,000 indecent images of children, Cutts sentenced the accused to a 3 year community order with no prison time. The abuser remains free.

In April and May 2023, Cutts presided over the trial of Timothy Schofield, brother of TV presenter Phillip Schofield, on charges of sexual offences involving a minor, imposing a sentence of 12 years imprisonment. She also presided over the 2023 trial of Darren Osment, for the murder of his former partner Claire Holland in June 2012.

In March 2025 Cutts presided over the trial of Nasen Saadi, who was sentenced to a minimum of 39 years for the murder of Amie Gray and attempted murder of Leanne Miles, on Durley Chine beach, in Bournemouth in May 2025.
