= Matt Carter (politician) =

British labour party politician (b. 1972)

General Secretary of the Labour Party
- In office January 2004 – September 2005
- Leader: Tony Blair
- Preceded by: David Triesman
- Succeeded by: Peter Watt

Personal details
- Born: 22 March 1972 (age 54)
- Party: Labour
- Education: University of Sheffield; University of York
- Occupation: Academic, political operative, communications consultant

Matthew John Carter (born 22 March 1972) is a former General Secretary of the British Labour Party, and now works in the public relations and communications consultancy industry.

== Early life ==
Born near Grimsby, Carter studied at Sheffield University and the University of York, and has a DPhil in Political History.

Carter was tutor in the Department of Politics at the University of York from 1994. He subsequently held a number of jobs in the Labour Party, including head of policy, local organiser for Teesside and Durham and regional director in South West England during the 2001 general election. As Assistant General Secretary, he set up Forethought, a policy think tank within the Party.

In 1997, Carter was a member of Labour's National Policy Forum and parliamentary candidate for the Vale of York. Matt Carter is Labour's youngest General Secretary, appointed to the job aged 31 in December 2003. He took up office on 1 January 2004 succeeding David Triesman, and announced his resignation on 6 September 2005, following the 2005 general election victory.

Carter has written The People's Party: the History of the Labour Party with Tony Wright (1997) and T.H. Green and the Development of Ethical Socialism (2003).

In January 2010 Carter became CEO of B-M UK, a leading public relations and communications consultancy, part of Young & Rubicam Brands, a subsidiary of WPP. He set up and ran the Europe Middle East and Africa (EMEA) office of Penn, Schoen and Berland. In 2013 he founded Message House, a communications consultancy.

Matt Carter married Erica Moffitt in 1997 and has three children.

Party political offices
Preceded by David Triesman	General Secretary of the Labour Party; 2004–2005	Succeeded by Peter Watt
