= Hollie Ridley =

General Secretary of the Labour Party
- In office 17 September 2024 – 17 September 2026
- Leader: Keir Starmer; Andy Burnham
- Preceded by: David Evans
- Succeeded by: Joe Fortune

Personal details
- Born: 1988 or 1989
- Party: Labour

Hollie Ridley (born 1988/89) is a British politician who served as general secretary of the Labour Party from 17 September 2024 to 17 September 2026.

== Biography ==
Ridley was educated at The Sydney Russell School. She graduated from the University of Brighton with an upper class 2:1 Honours in Humanities / Humanistic Studies in 2010.

Ridley joined the Labour Party in 2011. She was appointed general secretary in September 2024, serving in the position until September 2026.

Party political offices
Preceded by David Evans	General Secretary of the Labour Party; 2024-2026	Succeeded by Joe Fortune
