= Iain McNicol =

British politician and trade unionist (born 1969)

The Right Honourable The Lord McNicol of West Kilbride
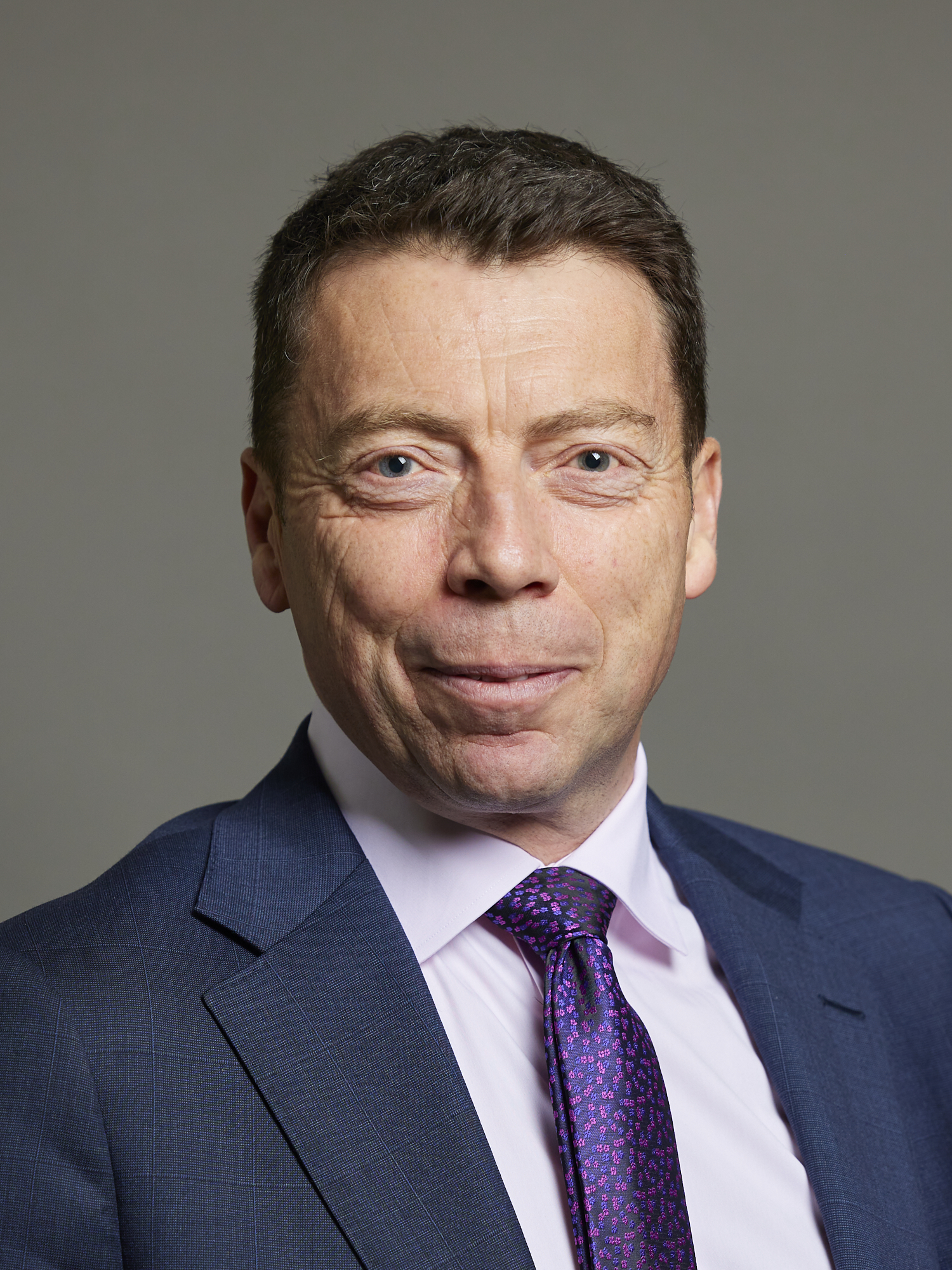
- Official portrait, 2024

General Secretary of the Labour Party
- In office 19 July 2011 – 20 March 2018
- Leader: Ed Miliband; Harriet Harman (acting); Jeremy Corbyn
- Preceded by: The Lord Collins of Highbury
- Succeeded by: Jennie Formby

Member of the House of Lords
- Lord Temporal
- Life peerage 21 June 2018

Personal details
- Born: 17 August 1969 (age 57)
- Party: Labour
- Spouse: Shelley McNicol
- Children: 2
- Education: Abertay University
- Other offices: 2018–2020: Opposition Whip

Iain Mackenzie McNicol, Baron McNicol of West Kilbride (born 17 August 1969) is a British politician, trade unionist and life peer who served as General Secretary of the Labour Party from 2011 to 2018. He was National Political Officer of the GMB trade union from 2004 to 2011.

== Early life and education ==
The son of Iain and brother of Natasha, Rebecca and Calum, McNicol was raised in Thirdpart, West Kilbride and attended Ardrossan Academy. He studied at Dundee Institute of Technology, where he began his involvement in political organising when being elected as president of the Student Union in 1991.

== Early political career ==
McNicol was elected National Campaigns and Membership Officer for Labour Students, and then acted as a Labour Party organiser and agent in south and east England from 1994 to 1997.

Following the 1997 United Kingdom general election at which Labour returned to office, McNicol served as a research, organisation, and political officer with the GMB Union, and in 1998 was appointed a regional organiser for its Southern Region. In 2004, he was promoted to National Political Officer. He served in that capacity through to 2011, coordinating the political strategy of the union and representing its members’ interests in both the public and private sector.

== General Secretary of the Labour Party ==
On 19 July 2011, Labour's National Executive Committee selected McNicol to become the party's next General Secretary under leader Ed Miliband. He was seen as the 'change candidate' and chosen against the wishes of Miliband, who supported the alternative candidate Chris Lennie.

McNicol's intention to stand down as General Secretary of the Labour Party was announced on 23 February 2018. On 20 March 2018 he was succeeded by Jennie Formby.

=== 2016 Labour Party leadership election ===
In June and July 2016, the Financial Times reported the office of Labour leader Jeremy Corbyn believed McNicol tried to prevent Corbyn from attending a key National Executive Committee (NEC) meeting and reported McNicol was alleged to be complicit in trying to exclude Corbyn from entering the second leadership election. It reported senior figures in the trade union movement were discussing replacement options for McNicol in his General Secretary role.

A civil High Court legal challenge was brought by Labour donor and former parliamentary candidate Michael Foster to contest the decision to allow Corbyn to be a candidate without having to secure any nominations from Labour MPs. The case went to court on 26 July 2016. McNicol was the first defendant on behalf of the members of the Labour Party. Corbyn applied to the court, and was accepted, to be a second defendant with his own legal team as Corbyn was "particularly affected and particularly interested in the proper construction of the rules" and that McNicol was "being expected to vigorously defend a position which he regarded as incorrect prior to the NEC decision". The High Court ruled that the NEC's decision that Corbyn should automatically be on the ballot was a correct interpretation of the Labour Party Rule Book.

An additional court case was brought against McNicol, in his position as General Secretary of the Labour Party, in August 2016 regarding the NEC's decision to disallow party members who had joined after 12 January 2016 from voting in the leadership election. The claimants won their case in the High Court but the decision was overturned on appeal.

=== Handling of antisemitism complaints and other controversies ===
In May 2019, Jon Lansman the founder of Momentum, a pro-Corbyn organisation, writing in the LabourList blog accused McNicol and his team of delaying action on handling antisemitism cases while he was General Secretary, and allowing a backlog of cases to build up which would damage the party and Jeremy Corbyn's leadership. A documentary made by Panorama, and shown on the BBC, addressed these claims, which were subsequently the subject of High Court action, resulting in damages being paid both to the journalist involved, and to those Labour Party staff who had blown the whistle.

In April 2020 a report commissioned by McNicol's successor Jennie Formby into antisemitism within the Labour Party, was leaked. This leak took place after the decision was made not to submit the report to the Equality and Human Rights Commission's investigation into institutional antisemitic racism. The report stated that WhatsApp message group transcripts published in the report showed that McNicol and members of his office failed to deal with antisemitism cases, worked against the objectives of the leadership of the Party, worked against Labour's objective of winning the 2017 general election, and made offensive comments about Labour members, staff, and politicians.

The EHRC Report was published in October 2020, and found the Party responsible for three breaches of the Equality Act (2010) relating to political interference in antisemitism complaints; failure to provide adequate training to those handling antisemitism complaints and harassment. The report went on to state that: 'The EHRC found evidence of political interference in the complaints process, with 23 instances of inappropriate involvement by the Leader of the Opposition's Office and others in the 70 files looked at.'

Prior to the publication of the EHRC Report, on 1 May 2020, the members of an investigation panel appointed by the Labour Party to look into various aspects of the report were announced. In early 2021 it was announced this report would be delayed due to the ICO investigation into the same leaks. The panel was concerned that the inquiry's findings could have the potential to prejudice the ICO's work. The Forde Report was completed and delivered to the Labour Party on 19 July 2022.

More leaked messages from WhatsApp groups involving McNicol were released in Al-Jazeera's 2022 documentary series "The Labour Files".

== Peerage ==
On 21 June 2018, McNicol was created a life peer as Baron McNicol of West Kilbride, of West Kilbride in the County of Ayrshire. On 4 September 2018, McNicol was appointed an Opposition Whip on the House of Lords frontbench.

As a result of the disclosures in the April 2020 report, McNicol stepped down from this role while an investigation was carried out. He was almost immediately appointed as Deputy Chairman of Committees (Lords), a position he held until 26 October 2023. McNicol subsequently returned to the Opposition frontbencher in the House of Lords on 27 October 2023 as Shadow Spokesperson, Business & Trade and Shadow Spokesperson for Scotland.

On 21 March 2025, the House of Lords Commissioners for Standards started an investigation into a possible breach of the House of Lords rules, after McNicol wrote to HM Treasury regarding a cryptocurrency company that was paying him.

=== Trip to Azerbaijan ===
In October 2024, McNicol was given a paid trip to Azerbaijan by an Azerbaijani group with connections to the authoritarian regime in Azerbaijan. McNicol was pictured laying a wreath at the grave of Azerbaijan's dictator Heydar Aliyev.

== Personal life ==
McNicol is married to Shelley and has a son, Hamish, and daughter, Scarlett. He holds a black belt in karate, and plays the bagpipes.

Party political offices
| Preceded by Ray Collins | General Secretary of the Labour Party; 2011–2018 | Succeeded by Jennie Formby |
Orders of precedence in the United Kingdom
| Preceded by The Lord McCrea of Magherafelt and Cookstown | Gentlemen; Baron McNicol of West Kilbride | Followed by The Lord Garnier |
