= Reg Underhill =

British party worker and politician

Henry Reginall Underhill, Baron Underhill CBE (8 May 1914 – 12 March 1993), was a British party worker and Labour politician.

== Background ==
He was the youngest son of Henry James Underhill and his wife Alice Maud Butler. Underhill was educated at Leyton Central School and left it in 1929. Aged only sixteen, he joined the Labour Party in the following year and was a Lloyd's Underwriter until 1933.

== Career ==
Subsequently, Underhill began working as a junior clerk in the party's head office and became vice-chairman in the constituency of Leyton West. He was appointed an honorary secretary of the British Workers' Sports Association and in 1936 travelled with the British delegation to the People's Olympiad in Barcelona. During the Second World War, Underhill refused to fight, citing his socialism, however served in the National Fire Service in London, often acting as a driver.

In 1945, after the end of the war, he was assistant to Morgan Phillips, at that time the General Secretary of the Labour Party. He was then administrative assistant to the party's national agent until 1947 and worked as propaganda officer until the next year. From 1948, Underhill served as Labour's regional organiser in the West Midlands until 1960, when he was chosen assistant national agent.

In 1972, he finally became the National Agent of the Labour Party. His work involved reporting on the Militant tendency as entrists into the Labour Party, eventually leading to their expulsion from the party. Underhill was awarded a Commander of the Order of the British Empire (CBE) in the 1976 Prime Minister's Resignation Honours and on his retirement from his post in 1979, he was created a life peer with the title Baron Underhill, of Leyton, in Greater London on 12 July. He became Labour's Opposition front bench spokesman on transport in the House of Lords in 1980 and on electoral affairs in 1983. On the resignation of Cledwyn Hughes in 1982, Underhill was elected deputy leader of Labour in the House, a post he held until 1989. He was a founding member of the reformed Association of Professional, Executive, Clerical and Computer Staff and received the union's gold medal.

== Family ==
He married Flora Philbrick in 1937. Underhill died in a hospital in Epping in 1993 and left a daughter, Joan, and two sons, Terry and Bob.

Party political offices
Preceded by Ron Hayward	Labour Party National Agent; 1973–1979	Succeeded by David Hughes
