= Larry Whitty, Baron Whitty =

British Labour Party politician

The Right Honourable The Lord Whitty PC
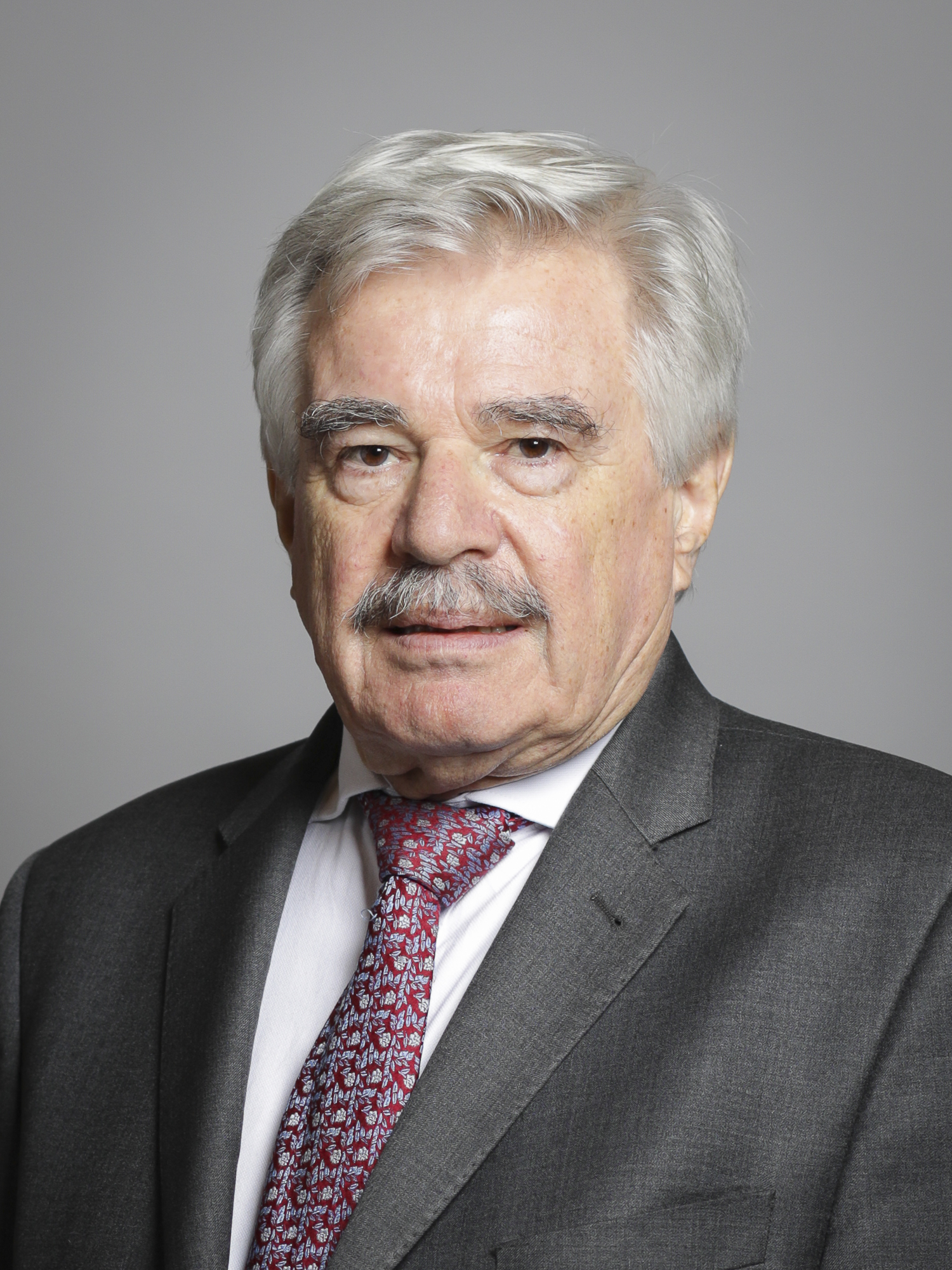
- Official portrait, 2019

Parliamentary Under-Secretary of State for Food, Farming and Sustainable Energy
- In office 12 June 2001 – 10 May 2005
- Prime Minister: Tony Blair
- Preceded by: Bob Ainsworth
- Succeeded by: The Lord Bach

Parliamentary Under-Secretary of State for Roads
- In office 28 July 1998 – 11 June 2001
- Prime Minister: Tony Blair
- Preceded by: The Baroness Hayman
- Succeeded by: David Jamieson

Lord-in-waiting Government Whip
- In office 7 May 1997 – 28 July 1998
- Prime Minister: Tony Blair
- Preceded by: The Viscount Long
- Succeeded by: The Lord Hunt of Kings Heath

Member of the House of Lords
- Lord Temporal
- Life peerage 21 October 1996

Personal details
- Born: 15 June 1943 (age 83)
- Party: Labour
- Education: St John's College, Cambridge

John Lawrence Whitty, Baron Whitty, PC (born 15 June 1943), known as Larry Whitty, is a British Labour Party politician.

== Early life ==
John Lawrence Whitty was born in 1943. He was educated at Latymer Upper School and graduated from St John's College, Cambridge, with a BA (Hons) degree in Economics. He worked for Hawker Siddeley Aviation from 1960 to 1962 and at the Ministry of Aviation Technology from 1965 to 1970.

== Career ==
=== Trade unions ===
He was employed by the Trades Union Congress from 1970 to 1973 and the General Municipal Boilermakers and Allied Trade Union from 1973 to 1985.

=== The Labour Party ===
In 1985, Whitty became the General Secretary of the Labour Party, a post he held until 1994. He was part of the reforming leadership of Neil Kinnock; in the role progressed a wide-ranging agenda including the modification of internal rules, a shift towards a national membership scheme, the expulsion of entryist Militant group members and, following the 1987 election defeat, the internal Policy Review. Whitty's period as General Secretary meant that he oversaw two general elections (the later in 1992), and the election of John Smith and Tony Blair as leaders of the party. He was the European Co-ordinator for the Labour Party from 1994 to 1997.

=== Peerage ===
Whitty was created a life peer on 21 October 1996 as Baron Whitty, of Camberwell in the London Borough of Southwark. From July 1998, Whitty was Parliamentary Under-Secretary of State at the Department of Environment, Transport and the Regions with responsibility for roads and road safety issues. From 1997 Lord Whitty was a Lord-in-Waiting (Government Whip) covering education and foreign affairs. He became Parliamentary Under-Secretary of State at DEFRA with responsibility for Farming, Food and Sustainable Energy in June 2001, serving in this position until the general election of May 2005.

=== Consumer Focus ===
Whitty was appointed as the first Chairman of Consumer Focus in July 2007. Consumer Focus was created through the merger of three organisations—energywatch, Postwatch and the National Consumer Council (including the Scottish and Welsh Consumer Councils)—by the Consumers, Estate Agents and Redress Act 2007.

== Personal life ==
Whitty is married, with two sons from a previous marriage. He is the brother of Geoff Whitty, a former director of the Institute of Education, London University.

Party political offices
Preceded by Jim Mortimer	General Secretary of the Labour Party; 1985–1994	Succeeded by Tom Sawyer
Orders of precedence in the United Kingdom
Preceded by The Lord MacLaurin of Knebworth	Gentlemen; Baron Whitty	Followed by The Lord Lloyd-Webber
