= Ron Hayward =

British politician (1917–1996)

Ronald George Hayward
- Born: 27 June 1917
- Died: 22 March 1996 (aged 78)

Ronald George Hayward, CBE (27 June 1917 – 22 March 1996), was a leading activist in the British Labour Party.

== Early life ==
Born near Chipping Sodbury in Gloucestershire, Hayward served in the Royal Air Force during World War II.

== Labour Party ==
At the end of the war, Hayward became the Labour Party's secretary and agent in Banbury. In 1949 he moved to Kent, where he began a friendship with local MP Arthur Bottomley. The following year, Bottomley ensured his appointment as the party's London assistant regional organiser, and in 1959 he became organiser for the Southern region. He served in this role until 1969, when he became a National Agent.

In 1972, he narrowly defeated Gwyn Morgan to become General Secretary of the Labour Party.

As General Secretary, Hayward opposed entry to the Common Market and supported unilateral nuclear disarmament. He strongly supported the Presidency of Salvador Allende in Chile, and after its overthrow became friends with Hortensia Bussi, Allende's former wife. Privately, he was very critical of the Labour Party leadership's lack of response to the Chilean Coup.

In the 1980s he opposed the Militant Tendency, but was reluctant to expel its supporters from the party. He was fiercely opposed to the Gang of Four, who led the split which formed the Social Democratic Party.

== Retirement ==
In 1982, Hayward retired from his Labour Party positions.

Party political offices
Preceded by Sara Barker	Labour Party National Agent; 1969–1972	Succeeded by Reg Underhill
Preceded by Harry Nicholas	General Secretary of the Labour Party; 1972–1982	Succeeded by Jim Mortimer
