= Office for Equality and Opportunity =

Office of the British government

Coordinates: 51.4981°N 0.1424°W

Agency overview
- Formed: October 2007
- Jurisdiction: England
- Headquarters: London, England
- Annual budget: £16.7 million in 2019–2020
- Parent department: Ministry of Housing, Communities and Local Government
- Website: https://www.gov.uk/government/organisations/office-for-equality-and-opportunity

The Office for Equality and Opportunity, formerly known as the Government Equalities Office, is the office of the British government with responsibility for social equality, led by the Minister for Women and Equalities. It has been part of the Ministry of Housing, Communities and Local Government since July 2026, having previously been based in the Cabinet Office.

The Office for Equality and Opportunity is responsible for leading on equality policy including women's equality, race equality, LGBT+ equality, disability equality, socio-economic equality and the overall framework of equality legislation for the UK. It contains three smaller equalities units within it known as the Disability Unit, the Race Equality Unit and the Women and Equalities Unit.

== History ==
Prime minister Gordon Brown created the Government Equalities Office (GEO) as a new ministerial department on 12 October 2007, led by Harriet Harman as Minister for Women and Equality, Lord Privy Seal and Leader of the House of Commons.

When David Cameron became prime minister, the GEO was transferred to become a part of the Home Office, led by Theresa May as Minister for Women and Equalities and Home Secretary. Between 2012 and 2019, the GEO was transferred again repeatedly to the department that the new Minister for Women and Equalities was concurrently the Secretary of State for.

In October 2024, the GEO was renamed the Office for Equality and Opportunity (OEO).

Until July 2026, the women and equalities ministerial team were typically appointed to the department that the Minister for Women and Equalities led by virtue of their other Cabinet appointment. For example, between July 2024 and July 2026, under Bridget Phillipson (Minister for Women and Equalities and Secretary of State for Education), all OEO ministers were appointed to the Department for Education. Since July 2026, the women and equalities ministerial team have been appointed to the Ministry of Housing, Communities and Local Government.

== Ministers and spokespersons ==
As of 20 September 2026, the OEO ministers and spokespersons are as follows:

| Minister | Portrait | Office | Portfolio |
|---|---|---|---|
| Bridget Phillipson | | Minister for Women and Equalities | Promoting equality of opportunity for everyone, and reducing negative disparities; Strategic oversight of the government’s equality policy, for women, ethnicity, disability and LGBT+; Overall sponsorship of the Social Mobility Commission and Equality and Human Rights Commission; Overview of the overarching equalities legislative framework. |
| Stephen Timms | | Minister of State (Minister for Equalities) | Protecting and promoting disabled people’s rights, including by working with disabled people’s organisations and other stakeholders; Delivering the Plan for Disability, working with the Lead Ministers for Disability; Introduction of mandatory disability pay gap reporting; British Sign Language (BSL) policy and on-going delivery of the BSL Act 2022, including with the BSL Advisory Board; International work on disability |
| Satvir Kaur | | Parliamentary Under-Secretary of State (Minister for Equalities) | Driving effective action on race equality; Bill Minister for the Equality (Race & Disability) Bill; Sponsorship of the Race Equality; Engagement Group chaired by Baroness Lawrence; Equality data and analysis |
| Simon Lightwood | | Parliamentary Under-Secretary of State (Minister for Equalities) | Progressing LGBT+ equality; Bill Minister for the Conversion Practices Bill |
| Lord Collins of Highbury | | Parliamentary Under-Secretary of State (Minister for Equalities) | Equalities Minister in the Lords; Lords Minister for Conversion Practices Bill and LGBT+ policy; Special Envoy on LGBT+ rights;.Lead for UK’s hosting of the 2027 International Day Against Homophobia, Biphobia and Transphobia Forum (IDAHOT+) |

== Budget ==
The budget for the GEO reached £76 million in 2010–2011. Following a spending review this was set to decrease each year, to £47.1 million in 2014–2015. The budget continued to decrease year-on-year, with £16.7 million being allocated in 2019–2020.

== Governance ==
| Dates | Cabinet Minister | Unit status |
|---|---|---|
| October 2007 – May 2010 | Harriet Harman | Independent department |
| May 2010 – September 2012 | Theresa May | Home Office |
| September 2012 – April 2014 | Maria Miller | Department for Culture, Media and Sport |
| April–July 2014 | Nicky Morgan (for women) Sajid Javid (for equalities) | Department for Culture, Media and Sport |
| July 2014 – July 2016 | Nicky Morgan | Department for Education |
| July 2016 – January 2018 | Justine Greening | Department for Education |
| January–April 2018 | Amber Rudd | Home Office |
| April 2018 – April 2019 | Penny Mordaunt | Department for International Development |
| April 2019 – September 2019 | Penny Mordaunt | Cabinet Office |
| July–September 2019 | Amber Rudd | Cabinet Office |
| September 2019 – September 2022 | Liz Truss | Cabinet Office |
| September 2022 – October 2022 | Nadhim Zahawi | Cabinet Office |
| October 2022 – July 2024 | Kemi Badenoch | Cabinet Office |
| July 2024 – July 2026 | Bridget Phillipson | Cabinet Office |
| July 2026 – present | Bridget Phillipson | Ministry of Housing, Communities and Local Government |

== Controversies ==
In June 2011, it emerged that female staff at the GEO received 7.7% more pay than males on average. The information came to light following a Freedom of Information request by MP Dominic Raab. The enquiry also revealed that almost two thirds of the department's 107 staff were female. Raab criticised the department for double standards, stating "It undermines the credibility of the equality and diversity agenda, if bureaucrats at the government equalities office are preaching about unequal representation and the pay gap, whilst practising reverse". The differences between the genders became marked from 2008 under the leadership of Harriet Harman with the pay gap almost doubling from that time and six out of seven new jobs going to women.

In an interview about her role, director Hilary Spencer said:

I offer one-off career chats to people, including many women, who are trying to work out whether they can make the leap to the senior civil service and whether that's compatible with family life. Interestingly, I have very few conversations with men who wonder whether getting to Deputy Director is compatible with family life. There is still a point when women have children where they tend to take the brunt of the childcare and responsibilities.

== See also ==
- Minister for Women and Equalities
- Women and Equalities Committee
