= LaRay Denzer =

American historian and academic

LaRay Denzer is an American historian and academic who has written extensively on African women, in particular the role of women during the colonial period and during an era of military dictatorships.

Her efforts contributed to the development of historiography and the academic history of Nigerian women with works such as The Iyalode in Ibadan Politics and Society and a biography of Folayegbe Akintunde-Ighodalo.

== Selected works ==
=== Books ===
- Hansen, Karen Tranberg, ed. (1992). "Domestic Science Training in Colonial Yorubaland, Nigeria". African encounters with domesticity. Rutgers University Press. pp. 116–139.
- Gendering the African diaspora : women, culture, and historical change in the Caribbean and Nigerian hinterland. Byfield, Judith A. (Judith Ann-Marie), Denzer, LaRay., Morrison, Anthea. Bloomington: Indiana University Press. 2010. ISBN 978-0-253-35416-7. OCLC 313659087.
- Denzer, LaRay. (2001). Folayegbe M. Akintunde-Ighodalo : a public life. Ibadan, Nigeria: Sam Bookman Publishers. ISBN 978-048-012-9. OCLC 52570780.
- Money struggles and city life : devaluation in Ibadan and other urban centers in southern Nigeria, 1986-1996. Guyer, Jane I.,, Denzer, LaRay,, Agbaje, Adigun A. B., 1957-. Portsmouth, NH. 2002. ISBN 0-325-07065-2. OCLC 48144423.

=== Articles ===
- Denzer, LaRay (1982). "Wallace-Johnson and the Sierra Leone Labor Crisis of 1939". African Studies Review. 25 (2/3): 159–183. doi:10.2307/524215. JSTOR 524215. S2CID 144358931.
- Denzer, LaRay (1987). "Women in Freetown politics, 1914–61: a preliminary study". Africa. 57 (4): 439–456. doi:10.2307/1159893. ISSN 0001-9720. JSTOR 1159893. S2CID 146619306.
- Denzer, LaRay (1994). "Yoruba Women: A Historiographical Study". The International Journal of African Historical Studies. 27 (1): 1–39. doi:10.2307/220968. JSTOR 220968.
- Spitzer, Leo; Denzer, LaRay (1973). "I. T. A. Wallace-Johnson and the West African Youth League". The International Journal of African Historical Studies. 6 (3): 413. doi:10.2307/216610. JSTOR 216610.
- Denzer, LaRay (1975). "Towards a study of the history of West African women's participation in nationalist politics: the early phase, 1935-1950". Africana Research Bulletin Africana Research Bulletin. 6 (4): 65–81. ISSN 0259-9651. OCLC 772470537.
- Guyer J.I., Denzer L. (2013) Prebendalism and the People: The Price of Petrol at the Pump. In: Adebanwi W., Obadare E. (eds) Democracy and Prebendalism in Nigeria. Palgrave Macmillan, New York.
