= Ray Collins, Baron Collins of Highbury =

British politician and trade unionist (born 1954)

The Right Honourable The Lord Collins of Highbury
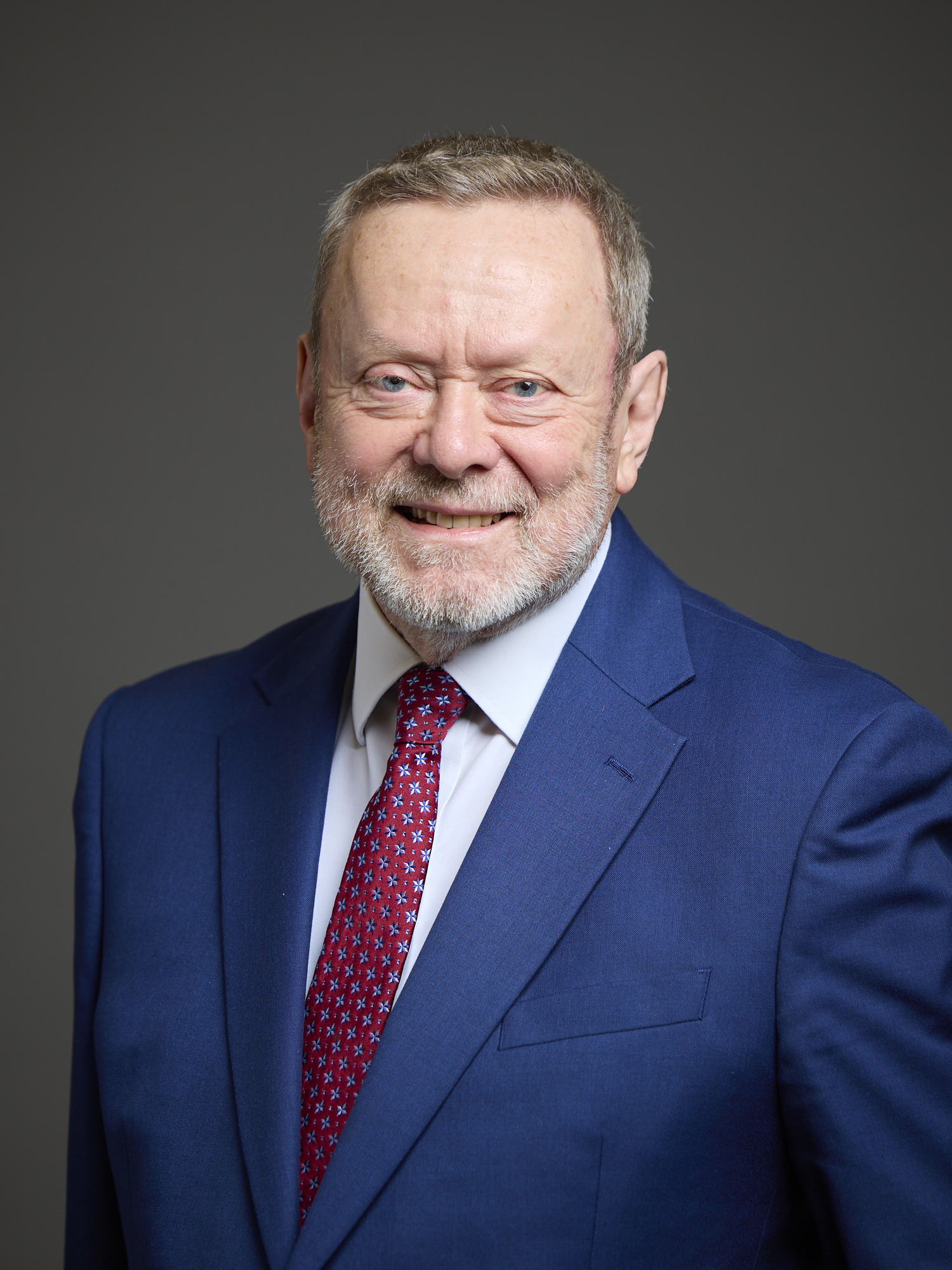
- Official portrait, 2026

Deputy Leader of the House of Lords
- Incumbent
- Assumed office 9 July 2024
- Prime Minister: Keir Starmer; Andy Burnham
- Leader: The Baroness Smith of Basildon
- Preceded by: The Earl Howe

Government spokesperson for Equalities
- Incumbent
- Assumed office 8 October 2024
- Prime Minister: Keir Starmer; Andy Burnham
- Preceded by: Office established

Parliamentary Under-Secretary of State for the Home Department
- Incumbent
- Assumed office 22 July 2026
- Prime Minister: Andy Burnham

Parliamentary Under-Secretary of State for Equalities
- Incumbent
- Assumed office 22 July 2026
- Prime Minister: Andy Burnham

Parliamentary Under-Secretary of State for Africa
- In office 9 July 2024 – 7 September 2025
- Prime Minister: Keir Starmer
- Preceded by: Andrew Mitchell
- Succeeded by: The Baroness Chapman of Darlington (Note: as Minister of State for International Development and Africa)

Lord-in-waiting Government Whip
- In office 9 July 2024 – 11 June 2026
- Prime Minister: Keir Starmer

Shadow Deputy Leader of the House of Lords
- In office 20 October 2021 – 5 July 2024
- Leader: The Baroness Smith of Basildon
- Preceded by: The Baroness Hayter of Kentish Town
- Succeeded by: The Earl Howe

Member of the House of Lords
- Lord Temporal
- Life peerage 20 January 2011

General Secretary of the Labour Party
- In office 12 June 2008 – 19 July 2011
- Leader: Gordon Brown; Harriet Harman (Note: As acting Leader); Ed Miliband
- Preceded by: Peter Watt
- Succeeded by: Iain McNicol

Personal details
- Born: Ray Edward Harry Collins; 21 December 1954 (age 71)
- Party: Labour
Shadow portfolios
2023–2024	Women and Equalities
2015–2024	Foreign Affairs
2011–2024	Whip
2023–2023	Cabinet Office
2020–2020	Women and Equalities
2013–2020	International Development
2012–2013	Work and Pensions

Ray Edward Harry Collins, Baron Collins of Highbury (born 21 December 1954) is a British politician and trade unionist serving as a member of the House of Lords since 2011. A member of the Labour Party, he served as General Secretary of the Party from 2008 to 2011. Collins has been Deputy Leader of the House of Lords, Parliamentary Under-Secretary of State for Africa, a Lord-in-waiting and Government spokesperson for Equalities since 2024. He has also been Parliamentary Under-Secretary of State in the Home Office and Parliamentary Under-Secretary of State for Equalities since 2026.

== Trade unionist ==
Collins was appointed Central Office Manager of the Transport and General Workers' Union in 1984 and held essentially the same post until 2008, being redesignated Head of Administration in the 1990s and Assistant General Secretary in 1999. He has been a member of the Labour Party for over thirty years and has campaigned for the party in every general election since 1970. He was TGWU representative on the Labour Party National Policy Forum and a member of Labour's National Constitutional Committee.

He helped steer the TGWU into a merger with Amicus, creating Unite, one of the largest trade unions in the country.

== Labour Party ==
Collins took the helm because the party was reportedly close to bankruptcy. In May 2008, Electoral Commission figures showed the party was £17.8 million in debt.

On 20 January 2011, Collins was created a life peer as Baron Collins of Highbury, of Highbury in the London Borough of Islington, and was introduced in the House of Lords on 24 January 2011, where he sits on the Labour benches. He was appointed a whip in 2011. He was appointed Labour's Lords Spokesperson for International Development in 2013.

On 10 July 2013 Collins was asked to review and make recommendations for internal Labour Party reform. His recommendations included replacing the electoral college system for selecting new leaders with a "one member, one vote" system. Mass membership would be encouraged by allowing "registered supporters" to join at a low cost, as well as full membership. Members from the trade unions would also have to explicitly "opt in" rather than "opt out" of paying a political levy to Labour. On 1 March 2014, at a special conference, the party largely adopted these recommendations.

== Personal life ==
Collins married his partner Rafael in 2014. He received a grant of arms, crest, supporters and badge from Garter Woodcock on 12 June 2015.

== Notes ==
Party political offices
Preceded by Peter Watt	General Secretary of the Labour Party; 2008–2011	Succeeded by Iain McNicol
Orders of precedence in the United Kingdom
Preceded by The Lord Wigley	Gentlemen; Baron Collins of Highbury	Followed by The Lord Hussain
