= Geoff Whitty =

Educational theorist

Geoffrey James Whitty CBE (31 December 1946 – 27 July 2018) was a British sociologist and professor for equity in education at the University of Newcastle, Australia and who was also a director of the Institute of Education, University of London.

Born in 1946, Whitty was educated at Latymer Upper School and graduated from St John's College, Cambridge. After postgraduate study at the Institute of Education, he became a lecturer in education (sociology and social studies) at the University of Bath in 1973. In 1981, he became a lecturer in urban education at King's College London before becoming Head, Professor and Dean of Education at Bristol Polytechnic (now the University of the West of England) in 1985.

In 1990, Whitty became Professor of Policy and Management in Education, Goldsmiths College. In 1992, he became Karl Mannheim Professor of Sociology of Education, Institute of Education. In 2000, he became director of the Institute of Education and finished his term at the end of 2010.

Professor Whitty was Chair of the British Council's Education and Training Advisory Committee. Whitty's main areas of research and scholarship are the sociology of the school curriculum, education policy, teacher education and health education. He has directed ESRC-funded research projects on the impact of education policies, such as the assisted places scheme, city technology colleges and changes in initial teacher education. His most recent project has been an evaluation of Education Action Zones.

He was the brother of Larry Whitty the former General Secretary of the Labour Party, Labour Peer and Minister.

Whitty was appointed Commander of the Order of the British Empire (CBE) in the 2011 Birthday Honours.
