= Folayegbe Akintunde-Ighodalo =

Nigerian civil servant, Feminist, and activist

- Born: Felicia Folayegbe Mosunmola Akintunde; 17 December 1923; Okeigbo Town, of Ile-Ife origin and a military outpost of Ile-Ife, (now Ondo State, Nigeria)
- Died: 14 February 2005 (aged 82); Ibadan
- Other name: Mosunmola
- Education: Queen's College, Lagos; University of London
- Occupations: Civil Servant, Economist and Mathematician
- Employer: Western Nigerian government
- Known for: First Woman Nigerian Permanent Secretary
- Board member of: Odua Investment Corporation; Nigeria Airways
- Spouse: Chief Jeremiah Aghedo Ighodalo
- Children: 3, Asuerinme Ighodalo, Pastor Itua Ighodalo of Trinity House Lagos, Mrs Tolulope Ighodalo

Folayegbe Akintunde-Ighodalo (17 December 1923 – 14 February 2005) was a Nigerian civil servant and activist. She was the first Nigerian woman to become a Permanent Secretary in Nigeria, on April 3, 1968.

== Life ==
Felicity Akintunde was born in Okeigbo in Ondo State in 1923. Her extended family believed in traditional Yoruba religion, and some in Islam, while her parents were Christian. She was initially educated in Nigeria where her ambition was to go to university and take a degree. She obtained teaching qualifications in 1943 and she taught until 1948. She was then allowed to travel to London for one year where she would need to be content with a diploma, and not a degree, from the Institute of Education which was part of the University of London.

In London, she became interested in student politics and particularly in the West African Students' Union where she was elected the second female vice-president in 1953. In the same year, she was elected the founding President of the Nigerian Women's League of Great Britain. Her new position took her to British political party conferences where she made new connections and she met Margaret Ekpo and Comfort Tanimowo Ogunlesi when they visited London to help negotiate Nigeria's new constitution. They were the only two Nigerian women involved in this important stage of creating an independent Nigeria. She was assisted particularly by her friendship with the socialist and feminist Mary Sutherland.

She rejected her first name of Felicia and adopted her second name, the Yoruba name Folayegbe and its diminutive Fola. She abandoned her course and her agreement with her funding body and took a job with the post office. With her wages, she was able to fund her own studies. In June 1954, she obtained her ambition of a degree, in economics. She married and during that time she gave birth to her first child and she was recruited to assist in the Nigeriaisation of Northern Nigeria. She saw some friction with British managers in the civil service but she worked in a number of ministries.

In 1968, she was the first Nigerian woman to be a permanent secretary in the Nigerian civil service. She was active in many women's organisations although her job in the civil service prevented her from taking the lead until after her retirement. After she retired she was more active and she also started a poultry farm which turned into a major business. She was a director of Nigeria Airways and other companies and was on a board of enquiry into student violence.

In 2001, LaRay Denzer wrote her biography, Folayegbe M. Akintunde-Ighodalo: a public life. Akintunde-Ighodalo died in 2005, at the age of 82.
