= Alan Fisher (trade unionist) =

British trade unionist

Alan Fisher (20 June 1922 – 20 March 1988) was a British trade unionist.

Born in Birmingham, Fisher spent his entire working life at the National Union of Public Employees, serving as General Secretary from 1968 to 1982. This was a period of rapid growth for the union and included the Winter of Discontent. In 1981, he served as President of the Trades Union Congress.

Trade union offices
Preceded by Sydney Hill	General Secretary of the National Union of Public Employees; 1968–1982	Succeeded by Rodney Bickerstaffe
Preceded by Terry Parry	President of the Trades Union Congress; 1981	Succeeded by Alan Sapper
