= Sydney Hill =

British politician

Sydney Hill (29 October 1902 – 17 August 1968) was a British trade unionist and politician.

== Background ==
Hill grew up in Dudley. He left school at the age of fourteen and completed an apprenticeship in engineering.

== Career ==
A keen trade unionist, Hill served as president of the Dudley and District Trades Council from 1928 to 1935. He also joined the Labour Party, and was elected to Tipton Borough Council in 1937, serving for ten years.

In 1935, Hill began working full-time for the National Union of Public Employees (NUPE), as its Midlands Organiser. Ten years later, he was promoted to become a national officer, then was Chief National Officer from 1960, and Assistant General Secretary from 1962. Later that year, he was elected as General Secretary of NUPE, and was also elected to the General Council of the Trades Union Congress.

As secretary, Hill was known for his negotiation skills, although his speeches were considered weak. By 1965, he was close to retirement, and the union was effectively run by his assistant, Alan Fisher. Hill reached the retirement age of 65 in 1967, and died the following year.

== Works ==
- Housing under Capitalism (1935)

Trade union offices
Preceded by Bryn Roberts	General Secretary of the National Union of Public Employees; 1962 – 1967	Succeeded by Alan Fisher
