= Harry Nicholas =

British trade unionist (1905–1997)

Sir Herbert Richard Nicholas OBE (13 March 1905 – 15 April 1997) was a trade unionist and political organiser.

== Early life ==
Born in Bristol, Nicholas worked for the Port of Bristol Authority until 1936, when he took a full-time post in the Transport and General Workers' Union (TGWU). He moved to London to become National Officer in 1940, and in 1956 rose to become Assistant General Secretary. In the same year, he was elected to the National Executive Committee of the Labour Party, and from 1960 to 1964 he was the party treasurer, appointed in order to maximise trade union donations.

Frank Cousins, General Secretary of the TGWU, served as Minister of Technology from 1964 to 1966, and during this period, Nicholas became Acting General Secretary, also serving on the General Council of the Trades Union Congress. In 1967, he returned to the Labour NEC. He took early retirement from the union in 1968 to become General Secretary of the Labour Party, having been offered the post by Harold Wilson after several other candidates refused the position.

Nicholas was criticised after Labour lost the 1970 general election, and he stood down in 1972.

Trade union offices
Preceded by Frank Cousins	Assistant General Secretary of the Transport and General Workers' Union; 1956–1968	Succeeded by Harry Urwin
Preceded by Frank Cousins	Acting General Secretary of the Transport and General Workers' Union; 1964–1966	Succeeded by Frank Cousins
Preceded by William Carron and George Lowthian	Trades Union Congress representative to the AFL-CIO; 1967; With: Jack Cooper	Succeeded by Sidney Greene and George Smith
Party political offices
Preceded by Aneurin Bevan	Treasurer of the Labour Party; 1960–1964	Succeeded by Dai Davies
Preceded by Len Williams	General Secretary of the Labour Party; 1968–1972	Succeeded by Ron Hayward
