= David Evans, Baron Evans of Sealand =

British politician (born 1961)

The Right Honourable The Lord Evans of Sealand
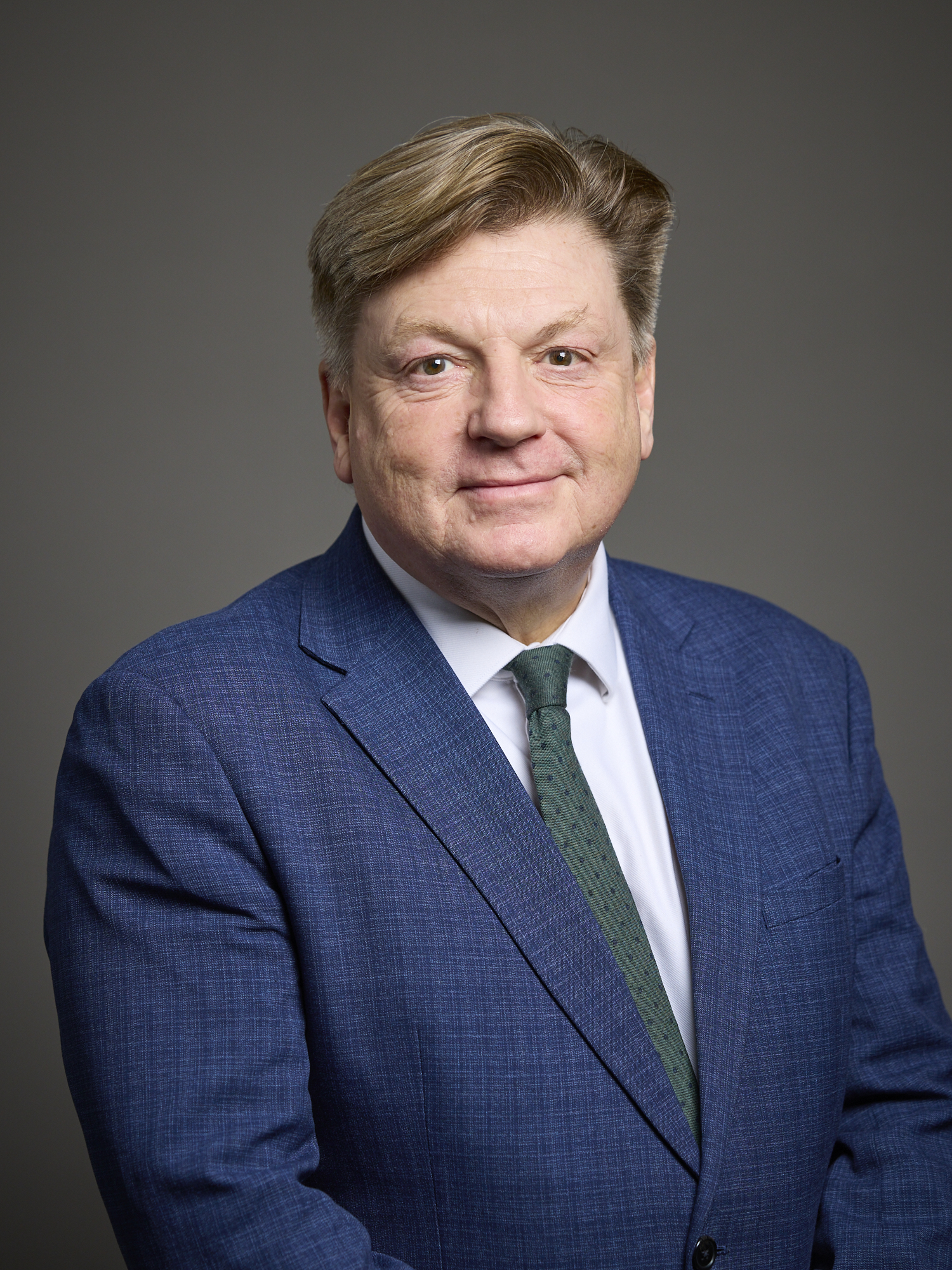
- Official portrait, 2025

General Secretary of the Labour Party
- In office 25 September 2021 – 17 September 2024
- Leader: Keir Starmer
- Preceded by: Jennie Formby
- Succeeded by: Hollie Ridley

Member of the House of Lords
- Lord Temporal
- Life peerage 17 January 2025

Personal details
- Born: David Richard Evans; February 1961 (age 65) Chester, England
- Party: Labour
- Spouse: Aline Delawa
- Education: University of York; St Olave's Grammar School

David Richard Evans, Baron Evans of Sealand (born February 1961), is a British politician who served as general secretary of the Labour Party from September 2021 to September 2024, having acted as general secretary since May 2020. He served as an assistant general secretary of the Labour Party from 1999 to 2001. Evans was the regional director of the North West Labour Party from 1995 to 1999 and founded The Campaign Company, a political consultancy. He has been a member of the House of Lords since 2025.

== Early life and career ==
Evans was born in February 1961 in Chester, moving to London when he was three. He attended the selective St Olave's Grammar School between 1972 and 1979. He was an activist during the miners' strike of 1984–85, during which time he was arrested "for something like highway obstruction as he delivered a food parcel to the striking miners".

He served as a Labour councillor in Croydon from 1986 to 1990. He was regional secretary of the Labour Party for North West England from 1995 to 1999. During this time he organised Labour's campaign in the 1997 Wirral South by-election, when the party gained the seat for the first time. Evans went on to serve as assistant general secretary of the Labour Party from 1999 to 2001. In 1999 he wrote a proposal to "overhaul" the party's structures, suggesting that "representative democracy should as far as possible be abolished in the Party" in favour of elections by one member, one vote. Evans argued this would "empower modernising forces within the party and marginalise Old Labour". He "played a key backroom role in [Labour's] 2001 election victory".

In 2001, Evans and Jonathan Upton, formerly Labour's head of corporate development, started a political consultancy in Croydon called The Campaign Company. The company supported Labour politicians Tony Banks and Robert Evans to seek selection. Evans' wife, Aline Delawa, was company secretary in 2002, at the same time as running the party's "constitutional and legal affairs unit". In 2002 the company was hired to support the cross-party European Movement which was lobbying for Britain to change currency to the Euro. The Daily Telegraph described the company as a "lobbying firm which advises the NHS, Government departments and political activists seeking selection as party candidates".

Evans served on the board of Chester F.C. and now serves on Chester F.C. Community Trust's board.

== General Secretary of the Labour Party ==
Following Labour's defeat at the 2019 general election and Jeremy Corbyn's resignation as party leader, Jennie Formby, Evans's predecessor and Corbyn ally, resigned as general secretary of the party.

Though Anneliese Midgley was initially favoured for the role, Evans was appointed by the National Executive Committee on 26 May 2020, winning twenty of the thirty-eight available votes. He beat Byron Taylor, the candidate considered to be his leading competitor, and other Labour activists including Andrew Fisher and Neena Gill.

His appointment was seen as a victory for Starmer, as Evans was described by The Independent as Starmer's "first choice" candidate. The Jewish Chronicle described Evans as a "staunch opponent of hard left politics" and a "fierce critic of anti-Zionism".

On 29 October 2020, Evans, along with the party's chief whip Nick Brown, suspended former leader Jeremy Corbyn due to his response to the Equality and Human Rights Commission's report into antisemitism in the Labour Party.

Evans announced that he was intending to stand down as General Secretary following the Labour Party's National Conference at the end of September 2024.

On 17 September 2024, Evans was succeeded as General Secretary by Hollie Ridley.

== House of Lords ==
Evans was nominated for a life peerage by Prime Minister Keir Starmer in late 2024. He was created Baron Evans of Sealand, of Chester in the County of Cheshire, on 17 January 2025, and was introduced to the House of Lords on 21 January.

== Personal life ==
Evans played bass and sang in the post-punk collective Greenfield Leisure, and supports Chester FC.

Party political offices
Preceded by Jennie Formby	General Secretary of the Labour Party; 2020–2024	Succeeded by Hollie Ridley
