= General Secretary of the Labour Party =

Senior employee of the British Labour Party

- Incumbent; Joe Fortune since 17 September 2026
- Labour Party
- Nominator: National Executive Committee of the Labour Party
- Appointer: Labour Party Conference
- Formation: 1900
- First holder: Ramsay MacDonald

The General Secretary of the Labour Party is the most senior employee of the British Labour Party, and acts as the non-voting secretary to the National Executive Committee. When there is a vacancy the National Executive Committee selects a provisional replacement, subject to approval at the subsequent party conference.

Joe Fortune currently holds the post since September 2026.

== Party structure ==
The General Secretary heads a staff of around 200 in their two head offices, one in London and Labour Central in Newcastle upon Tyne, and in the many local offices around the country. The Scottish and Welsh Labour Parties are headed by their general secretaries, de facto subordinate to the national general secretary.

The General Secretary is responsible for employing staff, developing campaign and media strategies, running the party's organisational, constitutional, and policy committees, organising the Party Conference, liaising with the Socialist International and Party of European Socialists, ensuring legal and constitutional propriety, and preparing literature.

The General Secretary also acts as the Registered Treasurer under the Political Parties, Elections and Referendums Act 2000, responsible for preparing accurate financial statements.

As the Labour Party is an unincorporated association without a separate legal personality, the General Secretary represents the party on behalf of the other members of the Labour Party in any legal matters or actions.

== History ==
The post of Party Secretary was created in 1900 at the birth of the Labour Party. The first holder of that position was Ramsay MacDonald, later Prime Minister. In these early years, the post was very important, effectively leading the party outside Parliament. MacDonald and his successor, Arthur Henderson, were both Members of Parliament and, for a period, were both Chairmen of the Parliamentary Labour Party while Party Secretary.

Upon Henderson's retirement in 1934, after the 1931 debacle which had seen MacDonald expelled from the party, it was decided that the position should be separated from the parliamentary party, and power should not be concentrated in the hands of one person. Therefore, Henderson's successor would not be allowed to become a Member of Parliament. This ruled out the strongest contender, Herbert Morrison, and others with parliamentary ambitions. Finally, Jimmy Middleton, assistant secretary since 1903, was chosen. He was a quiet-spoken man and the job lost much of its previous importance. However, the National Executive Committee grew in influence.

During World War II, Morgan Phillips became General Secretary and went on to oversee two general election victories. A Welshman, he had been a miner but was instrumental in widening Labour's appeal to the middle classes. He also built a professional Party, with key employees working on policy development and electoral organisation.

When Len Williams, the General Secretary of the early Wilson years, retired in 1968, he was expected to be replaced by someone younger who could transform the party and lead it to a third successive victory. However, the party chose Harry Nicholas, a long-serving left-wing T&G union figure who would be unlikely to continue to renew and reinvigorate the party. The party lost the 1970 general election.

The 1970s and early 1980s saw developing confrontations between the left and the right in the party. Jim Mortimer and Larry Whitty worked hard to keep the party together after the formation of the Social Democratic Party and the rise of the Militant tendency. Whitty oversaw the reforms of Neil Kinnock and stayed on until the election of Tony Blair as Leader. It would be Tom Sawyer who would put in place Blair's New Labour reforms, with the creation of the National Policy Forum, the change to Clause IV and the perceived erosion of the power of grassroots members. He opened new offices in Millbank and created a highly professional, media-savvy, youthful staff and Party that worked for Labour's landslide victory in the 1997 general election.

Crucial to this period was the transformation of the party apparatus from an alternative centre of power to the parliamentary leadership (largely a product of the 1970s when the party conference repeatedly disowned government policy), to being more congruent with the leadership's ideas for progress.

Margaret McDonagh became Labour's first Permanent female General Secretary in 1998. She had been a rising star and formidable organiser in the run-up to 1997, seen as the key party official responsible for the record landslide victory, but her fearsome style did not endear her to Party members and the left. Her handling of the candidate selection for the 2000 London mayoral election badly damaged her reputation. However, her formidable organisational skills contributed to a second victory in 2001. McDonagh left after the 2001 general election victory and was succeeded by David Triesman. The party moved in 2004 to appoint Matt Carter as the youngest-ever General Secretary. He resigned after less than two years following the less than convincing 2005 general election victory and was replaced in January 2006 by Peter Watt. Watt became embroiled in the funding scandals of 2007 and resigned soon after.

In early 2008 David Pitt-Watson, a key Gordon Brown ally, was selected for the post under the banner of party finance reform, but never took up the post "for legal and financial reasons". The poor state of the party's finances following the decision by the leadership of the party to finance the General Election campaign in 2005 with loans meant that the auditors of the party had to inform him that his wealth, after a career partly in the City of London, would be at risk if the party did become bankrupt. Ray Collins was appointed in 2008, and was succeeded by Iain McNicol in 2011. McNicol resigned from the post in early 2018, citing a desire to "pursue new challenges". On 20 March 2018, Jennie Formby was appointed as the General Secretary effective from April 2018. She resigned on 4 May 2020, following the election of Keir Starmer as new Labour leader, saying "now we have a new leadership team it is the right time to step down". On 26 May 2020, David Evans was appointed as the General Secretary. This was following an allegedly close run between Evans, Starmer's preferred choice, and Byron Taylor, favoured by the Labour left. On 3 September 2024, Evans announced he would resign in later that month. On 17 September 2024, Hollie Ridley succeeded Evans as General Secretary.

== List of General Secretaries (1900–present) ==
Note: the right-hand column does not allocate height proportional to time in office.

A list of General Secretaries (including acting general secretaries) since 1900.

| Portrait | | Term began | Term ended | Leader(s) |
|---|---|---|---|---|
| 1 | Ramsay MacDonald (1866–1937) | 1900 | 1912 | None |
| 1 | Ramsay MacDonald (1866–1937) | 1900 | 1912 | Hardie |
| 1 | Ramsay MacDonald (1866–1937) | 1900 | 1912 | Henderson |
| 1 | Ramsay MacDonald (1866–1937) | 1900 | 1912 | Barnes |
| 1 | Ramsay MacDonald (1866–1937) | 1900 | 1912 | MacDonald |
| 2 | Arthur Henderson (1863–1935) | 1912 | 1935 | MacDonald |
| 2 | Arthur Henderson (1863–1935) | 1912 | 1935 | Henderson |
| 2 | Arthur Henderson (1863–1935) | 1912 | 1935 | Adamson |
| 2 | Arthur Henderson (1863–1935) | 1912 | 1935 | Clynes |
| 2 | Arthur Henderson (1863–1935) | 1912 | 1935 | MacDonald |
| 2 | Arthur Henderson (1863–1935) | 1912 | 1935 | Henderson |
| 2 | Arthur Henderson (1863–1935) | 1912 | 1935 | Lansbury |
| 3 | James Middleton (1873–1962) | 1935 | 1944 | Lansbury |
| 3 | James Middleton (1873–1962) | 1935 | 1944 | Attlee |
| 4 | Morgan Phillips (1902–1963) | 1944 | 1962 | Attlee |
| 4 | Morgan Phillips (1902–1963) | 1944 | 1962 | Morrison (acting) |
| 4 | Morgan Phillips (1902–1963) | 1944 | 1962 | Gaitskell |
| 5 | Len Williams (1904–1972) | 1962 | 1968 | Gaitskell |
| 5 | Len Williams (1904–1972) | 1962 | 1968 | Brown (acting) |
| 5 | Len Williams (1904–1972) | 1962 | 1968 | Wilson |
| – | Sara Barker (acting) (1904–1973) | 1968 | 1968 | Wilson |
| 6 | Harry Nicholas (1905–1997) | 1968 | 1972 | Wilson |
| 7 | Ron Hayward (1917–1996) | 1972 | 1982 | Wilson |
| 7 | Ron Hayward (1917–1996) | 1972 | 1982 | Callaghan |
| 7 | Ron Hayward (1917–1996) | 1972 | 1982 | Foot |
| 8 | Jim Mortimer (1921–2013) | 1982 | 1985 | Foot |
| 8 | Jim Mortimer (1921–2013) | 1982 | 1985 | Kinnock |
| 9 | Larry Whitty (born 1943) | 1985 | 1994 | Kinnock |
| 9 | Larry Whitty (born 1943) | 1985 | 1994 | Smith |
| 9 | Larry Whitty (born 1943) | 1985 | 1994 | Beckett (acting) |
| 9 | Larry Whitty (born 1943) | 1985 | 1994 | Blair |
| 10 | Tom Sawyer (1943–2025) | 1994 | 1998 | Blair |
| 11 | Margaret McDonagh (1961–2023) | 1998 | 2001 | Blair |
| 12 | David Triesman (1943-2026) | 2001 | 2003 | Blair |
| 13 | Matt Carter (born 1973) | 2003 | 2005 | Blair |
| 14 | Peter Watt (born 1969) | 2005 | 2007 | Blair |
| 15 | Ray Collins (born 1954) | 2008 | 2011 | Brown |
| 15 | Ray Collins (born 1954) | 2008 | 2011 | Harman (acting: 1st time) |
| 15 | Ray Collins (born 1954) | 2008 | 2011 | Miliband |
| 16 | Iain McNicol (born 1969) | 2011 | 2018 | Miliband |
| 16 | Iain McNicol (born 1969) | 2011 | 2018 | Harman (acting: 2nd time) |
| 16 | Iain McNicol (born 1969) | 2011 | 2018 | Corbyn |
| 17 | Jennie Formby (born 1960) | 2018 | 2020 | Corbyn |
| 18 | David Evans (born 1961) | 26 May 2020 | 2024 | Starmer |
| 19 | Hollie Ridley | 17 September 2024 | 17 September 2026 | Starmer |
| 19 | Hollie Ridley | 17 September 2024 | 17 September 2026 | Burnham |
| 20 | Joe Fortune | 2026 | | Burnham |

== Sources ==
- A Short History of the Labour Party, Henry Pelling, 2005, ISBN 1-4039-9313-0
