= David Abrahams (businessman) =

British entrepreneur, philanthropist and political (born 1944)

David Martin Abrahams
- Born: 13 November 1944 (age 81); Newcastle upon Tyne, England
- Citizenship: British
- Occupations: Entrepreneur, philanthropist, political figure

David Martin Abrahams (Stroll) (born 13 November 1944) is a British entrepreneur, philanthropist and political figure whose influence spans business, international diplomacy, and social reform. Renowned for his enduring support of the Labour Party, Abrahams has played a key role in shaping Track II diplomacy efforts across the Middle East.

== Early life ==
Born in Newcastle upon Tyne and raised in Whitley Bay, Abrahams lived in a household steeped in political and cultural life. His father, Bennie Abrahams, was a Labour councillor in Newcastle for 35 years and served as Lord Mayor. His mother, Marion Marcelline Abrahams, was a professional violinist with the Liverpool Philharmonic Orchestra and also served as a local labour councillor.

== Political career ==
Abrahams served on Tyne and Wear County Council (1977–1983), with a focus on economic development, and planning and transportation. He remained active within the Labour Party, where he became a quiet but influential supporter of New Labour, aligned with Tony Blair. He served on the party's North Region's Executive Council for almost 25 years. He served as Vice-Chair of the Jewish Labour Movement and Acting Director of Labour Friends of Israel.

In 2007, Abrahams became the subject of intense media scrutiny in what became known as the "Donorgate" affair. Allegations surfaced that he had channelled donations to the Labour Party through third parties—an act initially perceived as a potential breach of transparency laws. Abrahams consistently maintained that the party had approved this method and that he had acted in good faith. Following a protracted investigation, the Crown Prosecution Service and police concluded in April 2008 that Abrahams had committed no wrongdoing. No charges were brought against him or the individuals involved.

The affair, despite his exoneration, had lasting reputational consequences and illustrated the destructive power of media speculation untethered to legal fact. The episode also highlighted vulnerabilities within the party's own internal processes and record-keeping.

== Diplomatic and interfaith engagement ==
Alongside political activism, Abrahams has played a significant role in Middle Eastern diplomacy. As Vice President and Global Ambassador of the Royal United Services Institute (RUSI), he helped convene high-level regional discussions between Arab and Israeli figures. His contributions to back-channel diplomacy, particularly during moments of high tension, were notable for their discretion and efficacy.

He has held discussions with senior Palestinian officials, including representatives of Hamas, members of the PLO and Fatah, including Yasser Arafat, and advocated for moderation and negotiation as viable paths to a lasting solution. His work helped to challenge absolutist rhetoric and encouraged strategic re-evaluation within parts of the Palestinian leadership.

Abrahams was instrumental in organising diplomatic conferences in collaboration with Arab foreign ministers to discuss paths to normalisation and the creation of a Palestinian state in tandem with Israel's security. His advocacy reflected a long-standing commitment to the principle that peace cannot be imposed but must be cultivated through dialogue, realism, and mutual respect.

== Philanthropy, mental health, and penal reform ==
Abrahams has matched his international focus with a deep concern for Britain's domestic challenges. Since 1968, he first served as trustee and board member of NEPACS (North East Prisons After Care Society) in 1968, where he has advocated for a rehabilitative justice system and improved aftercare for former inmates. His work has consistently emphasised the dignity of the individual and the importance of second chances in a healthy democracy.

In recent years, he has become a vocal proponent for mental health reform, warning of the long-term national consequences of underinvestment in psychological services. He has called for early intervention, increased public funding, and a more integrated national approach that treats mental health as a central pillar of both public safety and economic resilience.

His broader civic work includes being one of the founding members of the North East Alzheimer's Society and director for The Campaign for Pensioner Poverty. He has also served on the executive of the Council for Christians and Jews, including as Director of Parliamentary Affairs, where he championed interfaith dialogue during a period of rising sectarianism in British political life.

== Academic, business, and regional development ==
Abrahams's support for academic research and regional economic uplift has been no less impactful. He donated two tranches of £250,000 to establish a chair in International Politics of the Middle East at the University of Warwick, promoting nuanced scholarship in a field often dominated by ideological extremes.

In business, Abrahams has been active in both retail and property development. He founded the "London Girl" fashion chain throughout the country and developed affordable housing in former pit villages across the North East. His most ambitious project, the Integra 61 business park in Bowburn outside Durham - it took Abrahams 15 years to aggregate all the land for the project. It attracted one of Amazon's largest logistics hubs in the UK—an investment expected to generate over several thousands local jobs.
