= Opposition frontbench of Keir Starmer =

The frontbench of His Majesty's Loyal Opposition in the Parliament of the United Kingdom consists of the Shadow cabinet and other shadow ministers of the political party currently serving as the Official Opposition. From 2020 to 2024, His Majesty's Loyal Opposition was the Labour Party, and the Leader of the Opposition was Keir Starmer.

== List of shadow ministers ==
Key

Sits in the House of Commons
Sits in the House of Lords
Privy Counsellor
Shadow Cabinet full members **in bold**
Shadow Cabinet attendees **in bold italics**

Although listed, Parliamentary Private Secretaries do not sit on the front bench. Members of the front bench sitting on Labour's National Executive Committee are also listed.

=== Leader of the Opposition and Cabinet Office ===
Office of the Leader of the Opposition
Leader of the Opposition; Leader of the Labour Party; Shadow First Lord of the Treasury; Shadow Minister for the Civil Service	**Keir Starmer**	Apr 2020 – present
Deputy Leader of the Opposition; Shadow First Secretary of State to September 2023; Shadow Deputy Prime Minister from September 2023; Deputy Leader of the Labour Party; Strategic Lead for Labours New Deal from September 2023	**Angela Rayner**	Apr 2020 – July 2024
Chair of the Labour Party	Angela Rayner	Apr 2020 – May 2021
Chair of the Labour Party	**Anneliese Dodds**	May 2021 – July 2024
Chair of the Labour Policy Review	**Anneliese Dodds**	May 2021 – July 2024
National Campaign Coordinator	Angela Rayner	Apr 2020 – May 2021
National Campaign Coordinator	Shabana Mahmood	May 2021 – Sep 2023
National Campaign Coordinator	**Pat McFadden**	Sep 2023 – July 2024
Deputy National Campaign Coordinator	**Conor McGinn** (Note: Attending shadow cabinet since December 2021.)	Jun 2021 – Sep 2022
Deputy National Campaign Coordinator	**Ellie Reeves**	Sep 2023 – July 2024
Parliamentary Private Secretary to the Leader of the Opposition	Carolyn Harris	Apr 2020 – May 2021
Parliamentary Private Secretary to the Leader of the Opposition	Sharon Hodgson	May 2021 – Feb 2023
Parliamentary Private Secretary to the Leader of the Opposition	Jessica Morden	Feb 2023 – July 2024
Parliamentary Private Secretary to the Deputy Leader of the Opposition	Kim Johnson	Apr 2020 – Oct 2020
Parliamentary Private Secretary to the Deputy Leader of the Opposition	Navendu Mishra	Apr 2020 – Oct 2020
Parliamentary Private Secretary to the Deputy Leader of the Opposition	Florence Eshalomi (Note: Post joint with the Cabinet Office, Future of Work and LOTO teams due to Angela Rayner's several briefs.)	May 2021 – Sep 2023
Parliamentary Private Secretary to the Deputy Leader of the Opposition	Navendu Mishra	Sep 2023 – July 2024
Parliamentary Lead for the Labour Party Chair	Chris Elmore	

Cabinet Office
Shadow Chancellor of the Duchy of Lancaster Shadow Minister for the Cabinet Office	**Rachel Reeves**	Apr 2020 – May 2021
Shadow Chancellor of the Duchy of Lancaster Shadow Minister for the Cabinet Office	**Angela Rayner**	May 2021 – Sep 2023
Shadow Chancellor of the Duchy of Lancaster Shadow Minister for the Cabinet Office	**Pat McFadden**	Sep 2023 – July 2024
Shadow Minister of State at the Cabinet Office	**The Baroness Chapman of Darlington**	Jun 2021 – July 2024
Shadow Minister without Portfolio	Conor McGinn	Dec 2021 – Sep 2022
Shadow Minister without Portfolio	Nick Thomas-Symonds	Sep 2023 – July 2024
Shadow Minister for Young People and Democracy	Cat Smith	Apr 2020 – May 2021
Shadow Secretary of State for Young People and Democracy	Cat Smith	May 2021 – Nov 2021
Shadow Minister for Brexit and European Union Negotiations (Note: Position jointly with the shadow Cabinet Office and International Trade teams.)	Paul Blomfield	Apr 2020 – Dec 2020
Shadow Minister for the Cabinet Office (junior)	Helen Hayes	Apr 2020 – Dec 2020
Shadow Minister for the Cabinet Office (junior)	Rachel Hopkins	Dec 2021 – July 2022
Shadow Minister for the Cabinet Office (junior)	Florence Eshalomi	July 2022 – Sep 2023
Shadow Minister in the Cabinet Office	Nia Griffith	Sep 2023 – July 2024
Shadow Parliamentary Secretary to the Cabinet Office	Fleur Anderson	Jan 2021 – Dec 2021
Shadow Paymaster General	Jack Dromey	Jan 2021 – Dec 2021
Shadow Paymaster General	Fleur Anderson	Dec 2021 – Sep 2023
Shadow Paymaster General	Jonathan Ashworth	Sep 2023 – July 2024
Shadow Minister for Arts and Civil Society	Barbara Keeley	Mar 2022 – Sep 2023
Parliamentary Private Secretary	Beth Winter	Apr 2020 – Sep 2020
Parliamentary Private Secretary	Sarah Owen	Oct 2020 – Oct 2020
Parliamentary Private Secretary	Sarah Owen	Apr 2021 – May 2021
Parliamentary Private Secretary	Florence Eshalomi (Note: Post joint with the Cabinet Office, Future of Work and LOTO teams due to Angela Rayner's several briefs.)	May 2021 – July 2024
Shadow Spokesperson for the Cabinet Office, Constitutional and Devolved issues	The Baroness Hayter of Kentish Town	Apr 2020 – Oct 2021
Shadow Spokesperson for the Cabinet Office, Constitutional and Devolved issues	The Baroness Smith of Basildon	Apr 2020 – Oct 2023
Shadow Spokesperson for the Cabinet Office, Constitutional and Devolved issues	The Lord Kennedy of Southwark	May 2021 – May 2021; Feb 2023 – Oct 2023
Shadow Spokesperson for the Cabinet Office, Constitutional and Devolved issues	The Baron Collins of Highbury	Feb 2023 – Oct 2023

National Executive Committee
Front Bench Representative on the National Executive Committee of the Labour Party	Jim McMahon	Apr 2020 – May 2021
Front Bench Representative on the National Executive Committee of the Labour Party	Jonathan Reynolds	Apr 2020 – present
Front Bench Representative on the National Executive Committee of the Labour Party	Jo Stevens	Apr 2020 – May 2021
Front Bench Representative on the National Executive Committee of the Labour Party	Anneliese Dodds	May 2021 – present
Front Bench Representative on the National Executive Committee of the Labour Party	Shabana Mahmood	May 2021 – present

=== Devolved and local government ===
Department for Communities and Local Government (2020–21)
Levelling Up, Housing, Communities and Local Government (2021–present)
Shadow Secretary of State for Communities and Local Government	**Steve Reed**	Apr 2020 – Nov 2021
Shadow Secretary of State for Levelling Up, Housing, Communities and Local Government	**Lisa Nandy**	Nov 2021 – Sep 2023
Shadow Secretary of State for Levelling Up, Housing, Communities and Local Government	**Angela Rayner**	Sep 2023 – July 2024
Shadow Minister for Community Cohesion	Naz Shah	Apr 2020 – Dec 2021
Shadow Minister for Faiths	Janet Daby	Apr 2020 – Jul 2020
Shadow Minister for Faiths, Women and Equalities (Note: Position jointly with the shadow CLG and Women & Equalities teams.)	Janet Daby	Jul 2020 – Dec 2020
Shadow Minister for Homelessness, Rough Sleeping and Faith	Sarah Owen	Dec 2021 – Oct 2022
shadow Minister for Faith	Sarah Owen	Oct 2022 – Nov 2023
shadow Minister for Faith	The Baroness Sherlock	Nov 2023 – July 2024
shadow Minister for Homelessness, Rough Sleeping	Paula Barker	Oct 2022 – Sep 2023
Shadow Minister for Devolution and the English Regions	Paula Barker	Sep 2023 – Nov 2023
Shadow Minister for English Devolution and Local Government	Jim McMahon	Nov 2023 – July 2024
Shadow Minister for Housing and Planning (Note: Position in the shadow Housing team from 2020 to 2021 and shadow LUHCLG team from 2021.)	Matthew Pennycook	Dec 2021 – July 2024
Shadow Minister for Levelling Up	Alex Norris	Dec 2021 – Sep 2023
Shadow Minister for Business, Employment Rights and Levelling Up (Note: Position jointly with the shadow Department for Business and Trade teams.)	Justin Madders	Sep 2023 – July 2024
Shadow Minister for Local Government	Kate Hollern	Apr 2020 – May 2021
Shadow Minister for Local Government	Jeff Smith	May 2021 – Dec 2021
Shadow Minister for Local Government	Mike Amesbury	Dec 2021 – June 2022
Shadow Minister for Local Government	Sarah Owen	Oct 2022 – Nov 2023
Shadow Minister for Local Services and Communities	Liz Twist	Nov 2023 – July 2024
Shadow Minister for Democracy	Florence Eshalomi	Sep 2023 – July 2024
Shadow Minister for Building Safety and Homelessness	Mike Amesbury	Sep 2023 – July 2024
Shadow Minister for the New Deal for Working People	Imran Hussain	Sep 2023 – Nov 2023
Parliamentary Private Secretary	Feryal Clark	Apr 2020 – May 2021
Shadow Spokesperson for Communities and Local Government	The Lord Kennedy of Southwark	Apr 2020 – Dec 2021
Shadow Spokesperson for Communities and Local Government	The Baroness Blake of Leeds	May 2021 – Dec 2021
Shadow Spokesperson for Levelling Up, Housing, Communities and Local Government	The Baroness Hayman of Ullock	Dec 2021 – Oct 2023
Shadow Spokesperson for Levelling Up, Housing, Communities and Local Government	The Lord Khan of Burnley	Dec 2021 – July 2024
Shadow Spokesperson for Levelling Up, Housing, Communities and Local Government	The Baroness Wheeler	Dec 2021 – Feb 2023
Shadow Spokesperson for Levelling Up, Housing, Communities and Local Government	The Baroness Taylor of Stevenage	Feb 2023 – July 2024

Housing (2020–21)
Shadow Secretary of State for Housing	**Thangam Debbonaire**	Apr 2020 – May 2021
Shadow Secretary of State for Housing	**Lucy Powell**	May 2021 – Nov 2021
Shadow Minister for Housing and Planning	Mike Amesbury	Apr 2020 – May 2021
Shadow Minister for Housing (Note: Position in the shadow Housing team from 2020 to 2021 and shadow LUHCLG team from 2021.)	Mike Amesbury	May 2021 – Dec 2021
Shadow Minister for Planning (Note: Position in the shadow Housing team from 2020 to 2021 and shadow LUHCLG team from 2021.)	Ruth Cadbury	May 2021 – Dec 2021
Parliamentary Private Secretary	Feryal Clark	Apr 2020 – May 2021
Shadow Spokesperson for Housing	The Lord Kennedy of Southwark	Apr 2020 – Dec 2021
Shadow Spokesperson for Housing	The Baroness Blake of Leeds	May 2021 – Dec 2021

Northern Ireland
Shadow Secretary of State for Northern Ireland	**Tony Lloyd**	Apr 2020 – Apr 2020
Shadow Secretary of State for Northern Ireland	**Louise Haigh**	Apr 2020 – Nov 2021
Shadow Secretary of State for Northern Ireland	**Peter Kyle**	Nov 2021 – Sep 2023
Shadow Secretary of State for Northern Ireland	**Hilary Benn**	Sep 2023 – July 2024
Shadow Minister for Northern Ireland	Karin Smyth	Apr 2020 – Feb 2021
Shadow Minister for Northern Ireland	Alex Davies-Jones	Feb 2021 – Dec 2021
Shadow Minister for Northern Ireland	Tonia Antoniazzi	Dec 2021 – Sep 2023
Shadow Minister for Northern Ireland	Fleur Anderson	Sep 2023 – July 2024
Parliamentary Private Secretary	Ruth Jones	Apr 2020 – Aug 2020
Parliamentary Private Secretary	Charlotte Nichols	Aug 2020 – Nov 2020
Parliamentary Private Secretary	Kate Osborne	Dec 2021 – July 2024
Shadow Spokesperson for Northern Ireland	The Baroness Smith of Basildon	Apr 2020 – July 2024

Scotland
Shadow Secretary of State for Scotland	**Ian Murray**	Apr 2020 – July 2024
Shadow Minister for Scotland	Chris Elmore	Apr 2020 – Dec 2021
Shadow Minister for Scotland	Liz Twist	Dec 2021 – Sep 2023
Shadow Minister for Scotland	Gerald Jones (Note: Position jointly with the Whips team.)	Sep 2023 – July 2024
Shadow Minister for Scotland	Michael Shanks	Nov 2023 – July 2024
Parliamentary Private Secretary	Olivia Blake	Apr 2020 – Sep 2020
Parliamentary Private Secretary	Tonia Antoniazzi	Sep 2020 – Dec 2020
Shadow Spokesperson for Scotland	The Lord Davidson of Glen Clova	Apr 2020 – May 2021
Shadow Spokesperson for Scotland	The Lord Falconer of Thoroton	May 2021 – Nov 2021
Shadow Spokesperson for Scotland	The Baroness Smith of Basildon	Apr 2020 – Oct 2023
Shadow Spokesperson for Scotland	Lord McNicol	Oct 2023 – July 2024

Wales
Shadow Secretary of State for Wales	**Nia Griffith**	Apr 2020 – Nov 2021
Shadow Secretary of State for Wales	**Jo Stevens**	Nov 2021 – July 2024
Shadow Minister for Wales (Note: Position jointly with the Whips team.)	Gerald Jones	Apr 2020 – Sep 2023
Shadow Minister for Wales	Jessica Morden	Sep 2023 – July 2024
Parliamentary Private Secretary	Alex Davies-Jones	Apr 2020 – Feb 2021
Shadow Spokesperson for Wales	The Lord Griffiths of Burry Port	Apr 2020 – May 2020
Shadow Spokesperson for Wales	The Baroness Hayter of Kentish Town	Apr 2020 – May 2021
Shadow Spokesperson for Wales	The Baroness Wilcox of Newport	May 2021 – July 2024

=== Digital, culture, media and sport ===
Digital, Culture, Media and Sport
Shadow Secretary of State for Digital, Culture, Media and Sport	**Jo Stevens**	Apr 2020 – Nov 2021
Shadow Secretary of State for Digital, Culture, Media and Sport	**Lucy Powell**	Nov 2021 – Sep 2023
Shadow Secretary of State for Digital, Culture, Media and Sport	**Thangam Debbonaire**	Sep 2023 – July 2024
Shadow Minister for Arts and Civil Society	Barbara Keeley	Mar 2022 – Sep 2023
Shadow Minister for Arts, Heritage and Civil Society	Lilian Greenwood	Sep 2023 – July 2024
Shadow Minister for Music and Tourism	Barbara Keeley	Sep 2023 – July 2024
Shadow Minister for Arts, Civil Society and Youth	Rachael Maskell	Dec 2021 – Dec 2021
Shadow Minister for Cultural Industries	Tracy Brabin	April 2020 – Dec 2020
Shadow Minister for Cultural Industries and Sport	Alison McGovern	Dec 2020 – Dec 2021
Shadow Minister for Media	Chris Matheson	Apr 2020 – Dec 2021
Shadow Minister for Media, Data and Digital Infrastructure	Chris Elmore	Dec 2021 – July 2022
Shadow Minister for Media, Data and Digital Infrastructure	Stephanie Peacock	July 2022 – Sep 2023
Shadow Minister for Sport, Gambling and Media	Stephanie Peacock	Sep 2023 – July 2024
Shadow Minister for Creative Industries and Digital (Note: Position jointly with shadow Department for Science, Innovation and Technology teams.)	Chris Bryant	Sep 2023 – July 2024
Shadow Minister for Science, Research and Digital (Note: Position jointly with the shadow BEIS and DCMS teams.)	Chi Onwurah	Apr 2020 – Dec 2021
Shadow Minister for Sport	Alison McGovern	Apr 2020 – Dec 2020
Shadow Minister for Sport, Tourism, Heritage and Music	Jeff Smith	Dec 2021 – Sep 2023
Shadow Minister for Tech, Gambling and Digital Economy	Alex Davies-Jones	Dec 2021 – Sep 2023
Shadow Minister for Tourism and Heritage	Alex Sobel	Apr 2020 – Dec 2021
Shadow Minister for Voluntary Sector and Charities	Rachael Maskell	Apr 2020 – Dec 2021
Parliamentary Private Secretary	Olivia Blake	Apr 2020 – Sep 2020
Shadow Spokesperson for Digital, Culture, Media and Sport	The Lord Griffiths of Burry Port	Apr 2020 – May 2020
Shadow Spokesperson for Digital, Culture, Media and Sport	The Baroness Hayter of Kentish Town	Apr 2020 – May 2021
Shadow Spokesperson for Digital, Culture, Media and Sport	The Lord Bassam of Brighton	May 2020 – July 2024
Shadow Spokesperson for Digital, Culture, Media and Sport	The Lord Stevenson of Balmacara	May 2020 – Jan 2021; Oct 2022 – Feb 2023
Shadow Spokesperson for Digital, Culture, Media and Sport	The Baroness Merron	May 2021 – Oct 2023
Shadow Spokesperson for Digital, Culture, Media and Sport	The Baroness Thornton	Oct 2023 – July 2024
Opposition Whip in the House of Lords	The Baroness Merron	May 2021 – Oct 2023

=== Economy ===
Business, Energy and Industrial Strategy (2020–21)
Business and Industrial Strategy (2021–23)
Business and Trade (2023 – )
Shadow Secretary of State for Business, Energy and Industrial Strategy	**Ed Miliband**	Apr 2020 – Nov 2021
Shadow Secretary of State for Business and Industrial Strategy	**Jonathan Reynolds**	Nov 2021 – Sep 2023
Shadow Secretary of State for Business and Trade	**Jonathan Reynolds**	Sep 2023 – July 2024
Shadow Minister for Business and Consumers	Lucy Powell	Apr 2020 – May 2021
Shadow Minister for Business and Consumers	Seema Malhotra	May 2021 – Dec 2021
Shadow Minister for Small Business, Consumers and Labour Markets	Seema Malhotra	Dec 2021 – Sep 2023
Shadow Minister for Investment and Small Business	Rushanara Ali	Sep 2023 – July 2024
Shadow Minister for Industry and Decarbonisation (Note: Position jointly with shadow Department for Energy Security and Net Zero teams.)	Sarah Jones	Sep 2023 – July 2024
Shadow Minister for Business and Industry	Bill Esterson	Dec 2021 – Sep 2023
Shadow Minister for Climate Change (Note: Position in the shadow BEIS team from 2020 to 2021 and Climate Change and Net Zero team from 2021.)	Matthew Pennycook	Apr 2020 – Dec 2021
Shadow Minister for Employment Rights and Protections (Note: Position jointly with the shadow BIS and Future of Work teams.)	Justin Madders	Dec 2021 – Sep 2023
Shadow Minister for Business, Employment Rights and Levelling Up (Note: Position jointly with shadow Department for Levelling Up, Housing and Communities teams.)	Justin Madders	Sep 2023 – July 2024
Shadow Minister for Trade	Gareth Thomas	Sep 2023 – July 2024
Shadow Minister for Exports	Afzal Khan	Sep 2023 – Nov 2023
Shadow Minister for Exports	Tan Dhesi	Nov 2023 – July 2024
Shadow Minister for the Green New Deal and Energy (Note: Position in the shadow BEIS team from 2020 to 2021 and Climate Change and Net Zero team from 2021.)	Alan Whitehead	Apr 2020 – Dec 2021
Shadow Minister for Labour	The Baroness Hayter of Kentish Town	Apr 2020 – Oct 2021
Shadow Minister for Science, Research and Digital (Note: Position jointly with the shadow BEIS and DCMS teams.)	Chi Onwurah	Apr 2020 – Dec 2021
Shadow Minister for Science, Research and Innovation	Chi Onwurah	Dec 2021 – Sep 2023
Parliamentary Private Secretary	Sam Tarry	Apr 2020 – Jan 2021
Shadow Spokesperson for Business, Energy and Industrial Strategy	The Lord Bassam of Brighton	Apr 2020 – Sep 2023
Shadow Spokesperson for Business, Energy and Industrial Strategy	The Lord Stevenson of Balmacara	Apr 2020 – Jan 2021; Feb 2023 – Sep 2023
Shadow Spokesperson for Business, Energy and Industrial Strategy	The Lord Lennie	May 2021 – Feb 2023
Shadow Spokesperson for Business, Energy and Industrial Strategy	The Baroness Chapman of Darlington	Dec 2021 – June 2022; Feb 2023 – Oct 2023
Shadow Spokesperson for Business, Energy and Industrial Strategy	Lord Leong	February 2023 – July 2024
Shadow Spokesperson for Business, Energy and Industrial Strategy	Lord McNicol	October 2023 – July 2024
Shadow Spokesperson for Energy	The Lord Grantchester	Apr 2020 – Jan 2022
Opposition Whip in the House of Lords	The Baroness Blake of Leeds	May 2021 – Oct 2023

Employment Rights and Protections (2020–21)
Future of Work (2021–2023)
Shadow Secretary of State for the Future of Work	**Angela Rayner**	May 2021 – Sep 2023
Shadow Secretary of State for Employment Rights and Protections	**Andy McDonald**	Apr 2020 – Sep 2021
Shadow Minister for Employment Rights	Imran Hussain	Apr 2020 – Sep 2023
Shadow Minister for Employment Rights and Protections (Note: Position jointly with the shadow BIS and Future of Work teams.)	Justin Madders	Dec 2021 – Sep 2023
Parliamentary Private Secretary to the Shadow Employment Secretary	Mary Foy	Apr 2020 – Oct 2020
Parliamentary Private Secretary to the Shadow Future of Work Secretary	Florence Eshalomi (Note: Post joint with the Cabinet Office, Future of Work and LOTO teams due to Angela Rayner's several briefs.)	May 2021 – Sep 2023

Treasury
Shadow Chancellor of the Exchequer	**Anneliese Dodds**	Apr 2020 – May 2021
Shadow Chancellor of the Exchequer	**Rachel Reeves**	May 2021 – July 2024
Shadow Chief Secretary to the Treasury	Bridget Phillipson	Apr 2020 – Nov 2021
Shadow Chief Secretary to the Treasury	Pat McFadden	Nov 2021 – Sep 2023
Shadow Chief Secretary to the Treasury	**Darren Jones**	Sep 2023 – July 2024
Shadow Financial Secretary to the Treasury	Dan Carden	Apr 2020 – Oct 2020
Shadow Financial Secretary to the Treasury	James Murray	Oct 2020 – July 2024
Shadow Economic Secretary to the Treasury Shadow City Minister	Pat McFadden	Apr 2020 – Nov 2021
Shadow Economic Secretary to the Treasury Shadow City Minister	Tulip Siddiq	Dec 2021 – July 2024
Shadow Exchequer Secretary to the Treasury	Wes Streeting	Apr 2020 – Oct 2020
Shadow Exchequer Secretary to the Treasury	Abena Oppong-Asare	Oct 2020 – Sep 2023
Shadow Exchequer Secretary to the Treasury	Tanmanjeet Singh Dhesi	Sep 2023 – Nov 2023
Shadow Exchequer Secretary to the Treasury	Lord Livermore	Nov 2023 – July 2024
Parliamentary Private Secretary	Abena Oppong-Asare	Apr 2020 – Oct 2020
Parliamentary Private Secretary	Tonia Antoniazzi	Jun 2021 – Dec 2021
Parliamentary Private Secretary	Debbie Abrahams	Jan 2022 – Feb 2023
Parliamentary Private Secretary	Samantha Dixon	Feb 2023 – July 2024
Shadow Spokesperson for the Treasury	The Lord Davidson of Glen Clova	Apr 2020 – May 2021
Shadow Spokesperson for the Treasury	The Lord Tunnicliffe	Apr 2020 – May 2023
Shadow Spokesperson for the Treasury	The Baroness Chapman of Darlington	Feb 2023 – Oct 2023
Shadow Spokesperson for the Treasury	Lord Livermore	April 2023 – Nov 2023

=== Environment ===
Climate Change and Net Zero (2021–2023)
Energy Security and Net Zero (2023–)
Shadow Secretary of State of Climate Change and Net Zero	**Ed Miliband**	Nov 2021 – July 2024
Shadow Minister for Climate Change (Note: Position in the shadow BEIS team from 2020 to 2021 and Climate Change and Net Zero team from 2021.)	Olivia Blake	Dec 2021 – June 2022
Shadow Minister for Climate Change	Kerry McCarthy	June 2022 – July 2024
Shadow Minister for the Green New Deal and Energy (Note: Position in the shadow BEIS team from 2020 to 2021 and Climate Change and Net Zero team from 2021.)	Alan Whitehead	Dec 2021 – Sep 2023
Shadow Minister for Energy Security	Alan Whitehead	Sep 2023 – July 2024
Shadow Minister for Industry and Decarbonisation (Note: Position jointly with shadow Department for Business and Trade teams.)	Sarah Jones	Sep 2023 – July 2024
Shadow Minister for Clean Power and Consumers	Jeff Smith	Sep 2023 – July 2024
Parliamentary Private Secretary	Mick Whitley	Dec 2021 – Dec 2021
Shadow Spokesperson for Business, Energy and Industrial Strategy	The Lord Bassam of Brighton	Apr 2020 – Sept 2023
Shadow Spokesperson for Business, Energy and Industrial Strategy	The Lord Lennie	May 2021 – July 2024
Shadow Spokesperson for Business, Energy and Industrial Strategy	The Baroness Chapman of Darlington	Dec 2021 – June 2022
Shadow Spokesperson for Energy	The Lord Grantchester	Apr 2020 – Jan 2022
Opposition Whip in the House of Lords	The Baroness Blake of Leeds	May 2021 – July 2024

Environment, Food and Rural Affairs
Shadow Secretary of State for Environment, Food and Rural Affairs	**Luke Pollard**	Apr 2020 – Nov 2021 (Note: On leave from August to October 2021.)
Shadow Secretary of State for Environment, Food and Rural Affairs	**Daniel Zeichner** (acting)	Aug 2021 – Oct 2021
Shadow Secretary of State for Environment, Food and Rural Affairs	**Jim McMahon**	Nov 2021 – Sep 2023
Shadow Secretary of State for Environment, Food and Rural Affairs	**Steve Reed**	Sep 2023 – July 2024
Shadow Minister for Air Quality	Ruth Jones	Dec 2021 – Sep 2023
Shadow Minister for Environmental Protection and Animal Welfare	Ruth Jones	Sep 2023 – July 2024
Shadow Minister for the Natural Environment and Air Quality	Lloyd Russell-Moyle	Apr 2020 – Jul 2020
Shadow Minister for the Natural Environment and Air Quality	Ruth Jones	Aug 2020 – Dec 2021
Shadow Minister for the Natural Environment and Climate Change	Alex Sobel	Dec 2021 – Sep 2023
Shadow Minister for Nature and Rural Affairs	Toby Perkins	Sep 2023 – July 2024
Shadow Minister for Flooding, Oceans and Coastal Communities	Emma Hardy	Sep 2023 – July 2024
Shadow Minister for Nature, Water and Flooding	Olivia Blake	May 2021 – Dec 2021
Shadow Minister for Flooding	Stephanie Peacock	Apr 2020 – May 2021
Shadow Minister for Food, Farming and Fisheries	Daniel Zeichner	Apr 2020 – May 2021
Shadow Minister for Food, Farming and Rural Affairs	Daniel Zeichner	May 2021 – Sep 2023
Shadow Minister for Food, Farming and Fisheries	Daniel Zeichner	Sep 2023 – July 2024
Parliamentary Private Secretary	Ruth Jones	Apr 2020 – Aug 2020
Shadow Spokesperson for Environment, Food and Rural Affairs	The Lord Grantchester	Apr 2020 – May 2021
Shadow Spokesperson for Environment, Food and Rural Affairs	The Baroness Jones of Whitchurch	Apr 2020 – July 2022
Shadow Spokesperson for Environment, Food and Rural Affairs	The Baroness Hayman of Ullock	Oct 2020 – July 2024
Shadow Spokesperson for Environment, Food and Rural Affairs	The Baroness Anderson of Stoke-on-Trent	Feb 2023 – Oct 2023
Opposition Whip in the House of Lords	The Lord Khan of Burnley	May 2021 – Dec 2021

=== Foreign relations ===
Foreign and Commonwealth Affairs (2020–21)
Foreign, Commonwealth and Development Affairs (2021–present)
Shadow Secretary of State for Foreign and Commonwealth Affairs	**Lisa Nandy**	Apr 2020 – Nov 2021
Shadow Secretary of State for Foreign, Commonwealth and Development Affairs	**David Lammy**	Nov 2021 – July 2024
Shadow Cabinet Minister for International Development	Preet Gill	Nov 2021 – Sep 2023
Shadow Cabinet Minister for International Development	**Lisa Nandy**	Sep 2023 – July 2024
Shadow Minister for Africa (Note: Position jointly with the shadow Foreign Affairs and International Development teams from 2020 to 2021.)	Stephen Doughty	Apr 2020 – Dec 2021
Shadow Minister for Africa	Lyn Brown	Dec 2021 – July 2024
Shadow Minister for Asia and the Pacific	Stephen Kinnock	Apr 2020 – Dec 2021
Shadow Minister for Asia and the Pacific	Catherine West	Dec 2021 – July 2024
Shadow Minister for Europe and the Americas	Catherine West	Apr 2020 – Dec 2021
Shadow Minister for Europe and the Americas	Stephen Doughty	Dec 2021 – Sep 2023
Shadow Minister for Europe and North America	Stephen Doughty	Sep 2023 – July 2024
Shadow Minister for the Middle East and North Africa	Wayne David	Apr 2020 – Dec 2021
Shadow Minister for the Middle East and North Africa	Bambos Charalambous	Dec 2021 – Jun 2023
Shadow Minister for the Middle East and North Africa	Wayne David	June 2023 – July 2024
Shadow Minister for Peace and Disarmament	Fabian Hamilton	Apr 2020 – Dec 2021
Shadow Minister for Peace and Disarmament, Latin America and the Caribbean	Fabian Hamilton	Dec 2021 – Sep 2023
Shadow Minister for Latin America and the Caribbean	Anna McMorrin	Sep 2023 – July 2024
Parliamentary Private Secretary	Sarah Owen	Apr 2020 – Oct 2020
Parliamentary Private Secretary	Janet Daby	Dec 2021 – July 2024
Shadow Spokesperson for Foreign and Commonwealth Affairs (Note: Position jointly with the shadow Foreign Affairs and International Development teams from 2020 to 2021.)	The Lord Collins of Highbury	Apr 2020 – Dec 2021
Shadow Spokesperson for Foreign, Commonwealth and Development Affairs	The Lord Collins of Highbury	Dec 2021 – July 2024
Shadow Spokesperson for Foreign, Commonwealth and Development Affairs	The Baroness Smith of Basildon	Feb 2023 – Oct 2023

International Development (2020–21)
Shadow Secretary of State for International Development	**Preet Gill**	Apr 2020 – Nov 2021
Shadow Minister for International Development	Anna McMorrin	Apr 2020 – May 2021
Shadow Minister for International Development	Stephen Doughty (Note: Position jointly with the shadow Foreign Affairs and International Development teams from 2020 to 2021.)	Apr 2020 – Dec 2021
Shadow Minister for International Development	Yasmin Qureshi	Apr 2020 – Dec 2021
Parliamentary Private Secretary	Fleur Anderson	Apr 2020 – Jan 2021
Shadow Spokesperson for International Development (Note: Position jointly with the shadow Foreign Affairs and International Development teams from 2020 to 2021.)	The Lord Collins of Highbury	Apr 2020 – Dec 2021

International Trade (2020–2023)
Shadow Secretary of State for International Trade	**Emily Thornberry**	Apr 2020 – Nov 2021
Shadow Secretary of State for International Trade	**Nick Thomas-Symonds**	Nov 2021 – Sep 2023
Shadow Minister for Brexit and EU Negotiations (Note: Position jointly with the shadow Cabinet Office and International Trade teams.)	Paul Blomfield	Apr 2020 – Jan 2021
Shadow Minister for International Trade	Bill Esterson	Apr 2020 – Dec 2021
Shadow Minister for International Trade	Gareth Thomas	Apr 2020 – Sep 2023
Shadow Minister for International Trade	Nia Griffith	Dec 2021 – Sep 2023
Shadow Minister for International Trade	Ruth Cadbury	Dec 2021 – Sep 2023
Parliamentary Private Secretary	Charlotte Nichols	Apr 2020 – Nov 2020
Shadow Spokesperson for International Trade	The Lord Stevenson of Balmacara	Apr 2020 – Jan 2021
Shadow Spokesperson for International Trade	The Lord Bassam of Brighton	Apr 2020 – Sep 2023
Shadow Spokesperson for International Trade	The Lord Lennie	May 2021 – Sep 2023
Shadow Spokesperson for International Trade	The Baroness Blake of Leeds	December 2021 – Sep 2023

Defence
Shadow Secretary of State for Defence	**John Healey**	Apr 2020 – July 2024
Shadow Minister for the Armed Forces	Stephen Morgan	Apr 2020 – Dec 2021
Shadow Minister for the Armed Forces	Stephen Kinnock	Dec 2021 – Feb 2022
Shadow Minister for the Armed Forces	Luke Pollard	Feb 2022 – July 2024
Shadow Minister for Defence Procurement	Khalid Mahmood	Apr 2020 – Apr 2021
Shadow Minister for Defence Procurement	Chris Evans	May 2021 – Sep 2023
Shadow Minister for Defence Procurement	Maria Eagle	Sep 2023 – July 2024
Shadow Minister for Veterans	Sharon Hodgson	Apr 2020 – May 2021
Shadow Minister for Veterans	Stephanie Peacock	May 2021 – July 2022
Shadow Minister for Veterans	Rachel Hopkins	July 2022 – Nov 2023
Shadow Minister for Veterans	Steve McCabe	Nov 2023 – July 2024
Parliamentary Private Secretary	Chris Evans	Apr 2020 – May 2021
Parliamentary Private Secretary	Rachel Hopkins	May 2021 – Dec 2021
Parliamentary Private Secretary	Paulette Hamilton	
Shadow Spokesperson for Defence	The Lord Touhig	Apr 2020 – May 2021
Shadow Spokesperson for Defence	The Lord Tunnicliffe	Apr 2020 – July 2024
Shadow Spokesperson for Defence	The Lord Coaker	May 2021 – July 2024
Shadow Spokesperson for Defence	The Baroness Anderson of Stoke-on-Trent	Sep 2023 – July 2024

|}

=== Law and order ===
Home Department
Shadow Secretary of State for the Home Department	**Nick Thomas-Symonds**	Apr 2020 – Nov 2021
Shadow Secretary of State for the Home Department	**Yvette Cooper**	Nov 2021 – July 2024
Shadow Minister for Crime Reduction and Courts (Note: Position jointly with the shadow Home Department and Justice teams.)	Bambos Charalambous	Apr 2020 – May 2021
Shadow Minister for Crime Reduction and Courts	Holly Lynch	May 2021 – Dec 2021
Shadow Minister for Crime Reduction	Naz Shah	Dec 2021 – Nov 2023
Shadow Minister for Crime Reduction	Feryal Clark	Nov 2023 – July 2024
Shadow Minister for Domestic Violence and Safeguarding	Jess Phillips	Apr 2020 – Nov 2023
Shadow Minister for Domestic Violence and Safeguarding	Alex Davies-Jones	Nov 2023 – July 2024
Shadow Minister for Immigration	Holly Lynch	Apr 2020 – May 2021
Shadow Minister for Immigration	Bambos Charalambous	May 2021 – Dec 2021
Shadow Minister for Immigration	Jack Dromey	Dec 2021 – Jan 2022
Shadow Minister for Immigration	Stephen Kinnock	Feb 2022 – July 2024
Shadow Minister for Policing and the Fire Service	Sarah Jones	Apr 2020 – Sep 2023
Shadow Minister for Policing	Alex Norris	Sep 2023 – July 2024
Shadow Minister for Security	Conor McGinn	Apr 2020 – Dec 2021
Shadow Minister for Security	Holly Lynch	Dec 2021 – Sep 2023
Shadow Minister for Security	Dan Jarvis	Sep 2023 – July 2024
Parliamentary Private Secretary	Taiwo Owatemi	Apr 2020 – Sep 2021
Shadow Spokesperson for Home Affairs	The Lord Kennedy of Southwark	Apr 2020 – May 2021
Shadow Spokesperson for Home Affairs	The Lord Rosser	Apr 2020 – Feb 2023
Shadow Spokesperson for Home Affairs	The Lord Coaker	May 2021 – July 2024
Shadow Spokesperson for Home Affairs	The Lord Ponsonby of Shulbrede	May 2021 – July 2024

Justice
Shadow Secretary of State for Justice Shadow Lord Chancellor	**David Lammy**	Apr 2020 – Nov 2021
Shadow Secretary of State for Justice Shadow Lord Chancellor	**Steve Reed**	Nov 2021 – Sep 2023
Shadow Secretary of State for Justice Shadow Lord Chancellor	**Shabana Mahmood**	Sep 2023 – July 2024
Shadow Minister for Courts and Sentencing	Alex Cunningham	Apr 2020 – Sep 2023
Shadow Minister for Courts and Legal Services	Alex Cunningham	Sep 2023 – July 2024
Shadow Minister for Crime Reduction and Courts (Note: Position jointly with the shadow Home Department and Justice teams.)	Bambos Charalambous	Apr 2020 – May 2021
Shadow Minister for Crime Reduction and Courts	Holly Lynch	May 2021 – Dec 2021
Shadow Minister for Legal Aid	Karl Turner	Apr 2020 – Oct 2021
Shadow Minister for Legal Aid	Andy Slaughter	Oct 2021 – Dec 2021
Shadow Minister for Legal Aid	Afzal Khan	Dec 2021 – Sep 2023
Shadow Minister for Prisons and Probation	Lyn Brown	Apr 2020 – Dec 2021
Shadow Minister for Prisons and Probation	Ellie Reeves	Dec 2021 – Sep 2023
Shadow Minister for Prisons, Parole and Probation	Ruth Cadbury	Sep 2023 – July 2024
Shadow Minister for Victims and Youth Justice	Peter Kyle	Apr 2020 – May 2021
Shadow Minister for Victims and Youth Justice	Anna McMorrin	May 2021 – Sep 2023
Shadow Minister for Victims and Sentencing	Kevin Brennan	Sep 2023 – July 2024
Shadow Minister for Youth Justice	Janet Daby	Sep 2023 – July 2024
Parliamentary Private Secretary	Darren Jones	Apr 2020 – May 2020
Parliamentary Private Secretary	Ruth Cadbury	May 2020 – May 2021
Shadow Spokesperson for Justice	The Lord Falconer of Thoroton	Apr 2020 – Nov 2021
Shadow Spokesperson for Justice	The Lord Ponsonby of Shulbrede	Apr 2020 – July 2024
Shadow Spokesperson for Justice	The Baroness Chapman of Darlington	Dec 2021 – Feb 2023

Law Officers
Shadow Attorney General for England and Wales; Shadow Advocate General for Northern Ireland	**The Lord Falconer of Thoroton**	Apr 2020 – Nov 2021
Shadow Attorney General for England and Wales; Shadow Advocate General for Northern Ireland	**Emily Thornberry**	Nov 2021 – July 2024
Shadow Solicitor General for England and Wales	Ellie Reeves	Apr 2020 – Dec 2021
Shadow Solicitor General for England and Wales	Andy Slaughter	Dec 2021 – Nov 2023
Shadow Solicitor General for England and Wales	Karl Turner	Nov 2023 – July 2024
Shadow Advocate General for Scotland	The Lord Davidson of Glen Clova	Apr 2020 – May 2021
Shadow Advocate General for Scotland	The Lord Falconer of Thoroton	May 2021 – Nov 2021
Parliamentary Private Secretary	Darren Jones	Apr 2020 – May 2020
Parliamentary Private Secretary	Ruth Cadbury	May 2020 – May 2021

=== Parliament ===
House Leaders
Shadow Leader of the House of Commons	**Valerie Vaz**	Apr 2020 – May 2021
Shadow Leader of the House of Commons	**Thangam Debbonaire**	May 2021 – Sep 2023
Shadow Leader of the House of Commons	**Lucy Powell**	Sep 2023 – July 2024
Shadow Deputy Leader of the House of Commons	Afzal Khan	Apr 2020 – Dec 2021
Shadow Deputy Leader of the House of Commons	Jessica Morden	Dec 2021 – Sep 2023
Shadow Deputy Leader of the House of Commons	Nick Smith	Sep 2023 – July 2024
Shadow Leader of the House of Lords	**The Baroness Smith of Basildon**	Apr 2020 – July 2024
Shadow Deputy Leader of the House of Lords	The Baroness Hayter of Kentish Town	Apr 2020 – Oct 2021
Shadow Deputy Leader of the House of Lords	The Lord Collins of Highbury	Oct 2021 – July 2024

House of Commons Whips
Opposition Chief Whip in the House of Commons	**Nick Brown**	Apr 2020 – May 2021
Opposition Chief Whip in the House of Commons	**Alan Campbell**	May 2021 – July 2024
Opposition Deputy Chief Whip in the House of Commons	Alan Campbell	Apr 2020 – May 2021
Opposition Deputy Chief Whip in the House of Commons	Lilian Greenwood	May 2021 – Sep 2023
Opposition Deputy Chief Whip in the House of Commons	Holly Lynch (Legislation)	Sep 2023 – July 2024
Opposition Deputy Chief Whip in the House of Commons	Mark Tami (Accommodation and Pairing)	Sep 2023 – July 2024
Opposition Pairing Whip in the House of Commons	Mark Tami	Apr 2020 – Sep 2023
Shadow Vice Chamberlain of Her Majesty's Household	Jessica Morden	Apr 2020 – Sep 2023
Opposition Whip in the House of Commons	Chris Elmore Senior Opposition Whip(jointly with Deputy Party Chair)	Apr 2020 – July 2024
Opposition Whip in the House of Commons	Colleen Fletcher	Apr 2020 – July 2024
Opposition Whip in the House of Commons	Jeff Smith	Apr 2020 – May 2021
Opposition Whip in the House of Commons	Liz Twist	Apr 2020 – Sep 2023
Opposition Whip in the House of Commons	Bambos Charalambous	Apr 2020 – May 2021
Opposition Whip in the House of Commons	Rosie Duffield	Apr 2020 – May 2020
Opposition Whip in the House of Commons	Florence Eshalomi	Apr 2020 – Dec 2020
Opposition Whip in the House of Commons	Mary Glindon	Apr 2020 – July 2024
Opposition Whip in the House of Commons	James Murray	Apr 2020 – Oct 2020
Opposition Whip in the House of Commons	Marie Rimmer	Apr 2020 – Dec 2021
Opposition Whip in the House of Commons	Matt Western	Apr 2020 – Mar 2021
Opposition Whip in the House of Commons	Gill Furniss	Jul 2020 – Jan 2022
Opposition Whip in the House of Commons	Feryal Clark	May 2021 – Dec 2021
Opposition Whip in the House of Commons	Sarah Owen	May 2021 – Jan 2023
Opposition Whip in the House of Commons	Gerald Jones (Note: Position jointly with shadow Scottish Office teams.)	Dec 2021 – July 2024
Opposition Whip in the House of Commons	Taiwo Owatemi	Dec 2021 – July 2024
Opposition Whip in the House of Commons	Navendu Mishra	Jan 2022 – Sep 2023
Opposition Whip in the House of Commons	Tonia Antoniazzi	Oct 2022 – July 2024
Opposition Whip in the House of Commons	Christian Wakeford	Nov 2022 – July 2024
Opposition Whip in the House of Commons	Samantha Dixon	Sep 2023 – July 2024
Opposition Whip in the House of Commons	Kim Leadbeater	Sep 2023 – Mar 2024
Opposition Whip in the House of Commons	Andrew Western	Sep 2023 – July 2024
Opposition Whip in the House of Commons	Jeff Smith Senior Opposition Whip	Nov 2023 – July 2024
Opposition Whip in the House of Commons	Keir Mather	Mar 2024 – July 2024

House of Lords Whips (Note: Whips serving opposition teams are noted in brackets.)
Opposition Chief Whip in the House of Lords	**The Lord McAvoy**	Apr 2020 – Jun 2021
Opposition Chief Whip in the House of Lords	**The Lord Kennedy of Southwark**	Jun 2021 – July 2024
Opposition Deputy Chief Whip in the House of Lords	The Lord Tunnicliffe	Apr 2020 – June 2022
Opposition Deputy Chief Whip in the House of Lords	The Baroness Wheeler (Health and Social Care)	Apr 2020 – July 2024
Opposition Whip in the House of Lords	The Lord Collins of Highbury	Apr 2020 – July 2024
Opposition Whip in the House of Lords	The Lord Grantchester	Apr 2020 – May 2021
Opposition Whip in the House of Lords	The Lord Griffiths of Burry Port	Apr 2020 – May 2020
Opposition Whip in the House of Lords	The Lord Kennedy of Southwark	Apr 2020 – May 2021
Opposition Whip in the House of Lords	The Lord Lennie	Apr 2020 – Oct 2023
Opposition Whip in the House of Lords	The Lord Livermore	Apr 2020 – Jul 2020; Oct 2023 – July 2024
Opposition Whip in the House of Lords	The Lord McNicol of West Kilbride	Apr 2020 – Apr 2020
Opposition Whip in the House of Lords	The Lord Stevenson of Balmacara	Apr 2020 – Jan 2021
Opposition Whip in the House of Lords	The Baroness Wilcox of Newport (Education, Work and Pensions)	Mar 2020 – July 2024
Opposition Whip in the House of Lords	The Baroness Hayman of Ullock	Oct 2020 – July 2024
Opposition Whip in the House of Lords	The Baroness Blake of Leeds (BEIS, International Trade)	May 2021 – July 2024
Opposition Whip in the House of Lords	The Lord Khan of Burnley (DEFRA)	May 2021 – July 2024
Opposition Whip in the House of Lords	The Baroness Merron (DCMS)	May 2021 – July 2024
Opposition Whip in the House of Lords	The Baroness Chapman of Darlington	Jun 2021 – Dec 2022
Opposition Whip in the House of Lords	The Lord Coaker	Dec 2021 – July 2024
Opposition Whip in the House of Lords	Baroness Taylor of Stevenage	Jan 2023 – July 2024
Opposition Whip in the House of Lords	Lord Leong	Feb 2023 – July 2024
Opposition Whip in the House of Lords	The Baroness Twycross	Feb 2023 – July 2024
Opposition Whip in the House of Lords	The Baroness Anderson of Stoke-on-Trent	Feb 2023 – July 2024
Opposition Whip in the House of Lords	The lord Hunt of Kings Heath	Jan 2024 – July 2024

=== Social services ===
Child Poverty
Shadow Secretary of State for Child Poverty	**Wes Streeting**	May 2021 – Nov 2021

Education
Shadow Secretary of State for Education	**Rebecca Long-Bailey**	Apr 2020 – Jun 2020
Shadow Secretary of State for Education	**Kate Green**	Jun 2020 – Nov 2021
Shadow Secretary of State for Education	**Bridget Phillipson**	Nov 2021 – July 2024
Shadow Minister for Apprenticeships and Life-Long Learning	Toby Perkins	Apr 2020 – Sep 2023
Shadow Minister for Skills	Seema Malhotra	Sep 2023 – July 2024
Shadow Minister for Children and Early Years	Tulip Siddiq	Apr 2020 – Dec 2021
Shadow Minister for Children and Early Years	Helen Hayes	Dec 2021 – July 2024
Shadow Minister for Further Education and Universitiesto March 2021, Higher Education from March 2021	Emma Hardy	Apr 2020 – Mar 2021
Shadow Minister for Further Education and Universitiesto March 2021, Higher Education from March 2021	Matt Western	Mar 2021 – July 2024
Shadow Minister for Schools	Margaret Greenwood	Apr 2020 – Oct 2020
Shadow Minister for Schools	Wes Streeting	Oct 2020 – May 2021
Shadow Minister for Schools	Peter Kyle	May 2021 – Nov 2021
Shadow Minister for Schools	Stephen Morgan	Dec 2021 – Sep 2023
Shadow Minister for Schools	Catherine McKinnell	Sep 2023 – July 2024
Parliamentary Private Secretary	Christian Wakeford	May 2022 – July 2024
Shadow Spokesperson for Education	The Lord Bassam of Brighton	Apr 2020 – May 2021
Shadow Spokesperson for Education	The Lord Watson of Invergowrie	Apr 2020 – April 2022
Shadow Spokesperson for Education	The Baroness Sherlock	May 2021 – May 2022
Shadow Spokesperson for Education	The Baroness Chapman of Darlington	May 2022 – Feb 2023
Shadow Spokesperson for Education	The Baroness Twycross	Feb 2023 – July 2024
Shadow Spokesperson for Education	The Baroness Thornton	Feb 2023 – Oct 2023
Opposition Whip in the House of Lords	The Baroness Wilcox of Newport	Mar 2020 – July 2024

Health and Social Care
Shadow Secretary of State for Health and Social Care	**Jonathan Ashworth**	Apr 2020 – Nov 2021
Shadow Secretary of State for Health and Social Care	**Wes Streeting**	Nov 2021 – July 2024
Shadow Minister for Health	Karin Smyth	Sep 2023 – July 2024
Shadow Minister for Health	Feryal Clark	Sep 2023 – Nov 2023
Shadow Minister for Mental Health	**Rosena Allin-Khan**	Apr 2020 – May 2021
Shadow Secretary of State for Mental Health	**Rosena Allin-Khan**	May 2021 – Nov 2021
Shadow Cabinet Minister for Mental Health	**Rosena Allin-Khan**	Nov 2021 – Sep 2023
Shadow Minister for Women's Health and Mental Health	Abena Oppong-Asare	Sep 2023 – July 2024
Shadow Minister for Primary Care and Patient Safety	Feryal Clark	Dec 2021 – Sep 2023
Minister for Public Health	Andrew Gwynne	Dec 2021 – Sep 2023
Shadow Minister for Primary Care and Public Health	Preet Gill	Sep 2023 – July 2024
Shadow Minister for Public Health and Patient Safety	Alex Norris	Apr 2020 – Dec 2021
Shadow Minister for Secondary Care, Workforce and Patient Health	Justin Madders	Apr 2020 – Dec 2021
Shadow Minister for Social Care	Liz Kendall	Apr 2020 – Sep 2023
Shadow Minister for Social Care	Karin Smyth (acting)	Dec 2021 – Nov 2022
Shadow Minister for Social Care	Andrew Gwynne	Sep 2023 – July 2024
Parliamentary Private Secretary	Nadia Whittome	Apr 2020 – Sep 2020
Parliamentary Private Secretary	Ashley Dalton	
Shadow Spokesperson for Health and Social Care	The Baroness Thornton	Apr 2020 – April 2022
Shadow Spokesperson for Health and Social Care	The Baroness Merron	May 2021 – July 2024
Shadow Spokesperson for Social Care, Opposition Whip in the House of Lords	The Baroness Wheeler	Apr 2020 – July 2024

Department for Science, Innovation and Technology
Shadow Secretary of State for Science, Innovation and Technology	**Peter Kyle**	Sep 2023 – July 2024
Shadow Minister for Creative Industries and Digital	Chris Bryant	Sep 2023 – July 2024
Shadow Minister for Tech and Digital Economy	Alex Davies-Jones	Sep 2023 – Nov 2023
Shadow Minister for Tech and Digital Economy	Chris Evans	Nov 2023 – July 2024
Shadow Minister for AI and Intellectual Property	Matt Rodda	Sep 2023 – July 2024
Shadow Minister for Science, Research & Innovation	Chi Onwurah	Sep 2023 – July 2024
Shadow Spokesperson for Science Innovation and Technology	The Lord Bassam of Brighton	Sep 2023 – July 2024
Shadow Spokesperson for Science Innovation and Technology	The Lord Stevenson of Balmacara	Sep 2023 – July 2024
Shadow Spokesperson for Science Innovation and Technology	The Baroness Jones of Whitchurch	Oct 2023 – July 2024

Work and Pensions
Shadow Secretary of State for Work and Pensions	**Jonathan Reynolds**	Apr 2020 – Nov 2021
Shadow Secretary of State for Work and Pensions	**Jonathan Ashworth**	Nov 2021 – Sep 2023
Shadow Secretary of State for Work and Pensions	**Liz Kendall**	Sep 2023 – July 2024
Shadow Minister for Child Poverty Strategy	Kate Green	Apr 2020 – Jun 2020
Shadow Minister for Disabled People	Vicky Foxcroft	Apr 2020 – July 2024
Shadow Minister for Employment	Seema Malhotra	Apr 2020 – May 2021
Shadow Minister for Employment	Andy McDonald	May 2021 – Sep 2021
Shadow Minister for Employment	Alison McGovern	Dec 2021 – July 2024
Shadow Minister for Pensions	Jack Dromey	Apr 2020 – Jan 2021
Shadow Minister for Pensions	Matt Rodda	Jan 2021 – Sep 2023
Shadow Minister for Pensions	Gill Furniss	Sep 2023 – July 2024
Shadow Minister for Social Security	Karen Buck	May 2021 – Sep 2023
Shadow Minister for Social Security	Chris Evans	Sep 2023 – Nov 2023
Shadow Minister for Social Security	Alison McGovern	Jan 2024 – July 2024
Parliamentary Private Secretary	Tonia Antoniazzi	Apr 2020 – Dec 2020
Shadow Spokesperson for Work and Pensions	The Baroness Sherlock	Apr 2020 – July 2024
Opposition Whip in the House of Lords	The Baroness Wilcox of Newport	Mar 2020 – Feb 2023
Opposition Whip in the House of Lords	The Baroness Thornton	Feb 2023 – Oct 2023

=== Transport ===
Transport
Shadow Secretary of State for Transport	Jim McMahon	Apr 2020 – Nov 2021
Shadow Secretary of State for Transport	**Louise Haigh**	Nov 2021 – July 2024
Shadow Minister for Aviation and Maritime	Mike Kane	Apr 2020 – July 2024
Shadow Minister for Buses and Local Transport	Matt Rodda	Apr 2020 – Jan 2021
Shadow Minister for Buses and Local Transport	Sam Tarry	Jan 2021 – July 2022
Shadow Minister for Buses and Taxis	Simon Lightwood	Sep 2022 – Sep 2023
Shadow Minister for Local Transport (including buses, taxis and light rail)	Simon Lightwood	Sep 2023 – July 2024
Shadow Minister for Green Transport	Kerry McCarthy	Apr 2020 – Nov 2021
Shadow Minister for Railways	Tanmanjeet Singh Dhesi	Apr 2020 – Sep 2023
Shadow Minister for Railways	Stephen Morgan	Sep 2023 – July 2024
Shadow Minister for Roads	Gill Furniss	Jan 2022 – Sep 2023
Shadow Minister for Roads	Bill Esterson	Sep 2023 – July 2024
Parliamentary Private Secretary	Alex Davies-Jones	Apr 2020 – Feb 2021
Shadow Spokesperson for Transport	The Lord Rosser	Apr 2020 – Feb 2023
Shadow Spokesperson for Transport	The Lord Tunnicliffe	Apr 2020 – July 2024
Shadow Spokesperson for Transport	The Baroness Taylor of Stevenage	Feb 2023 – Oct 2023
Shadow Spokesperson for Transport	The Lord Liddle	Oct 2023 – July 2024

=== Women and equalities ===
Equalities Office
Shadow Secretary of State for Women and Equalities	**Marsha de Cordova**	Apr 2020 – Sep 2021
Shadow Secretary of State for Women and Equalities	**Anneliese Dodds**	Sep 2021 – July 2024
Shadow Minister for Faiths, Women and Equalities (Note: Position jointly with the shadow CLG and Women & Equalities teams.)	Janet Daby	Jul 2020 – Dec 2020
Shadow Minister for Women and Equalities	Gill Furniss	Apr 2020 – Jul 2020
Shadow Minister for Women and Equalities	Charlotte Nichols	Nov 2020 – Sep 2021
Shadow Minister for Women and Equalities	Taiwo Owatemi	Sep 2021 – Sep 2022
Shadow Minister for Women and Equalities	Yasmin Qureshi	Oct 2022 – Nov 2023
Shadow Minister for Women and Equalities	Ashley Dalton	Nov 2023 – July 2024
Parliamentary Private Secretary	Rachel Hopkins	Apr 2020 – Oct 2020
Shadow Spokesperson for Women and Equalities	The Lord Collins of Highbury	Apr 2020 – Sep 2020; Feb 2023 – July 2024
Shadow Spokesperson for Women and Equalities	The Baroness Hayter of Kentish Town	Apr 2020 – Sep 2020
Shadow Spokesperson for Women and Equalities	The Baroness Wilcox of Newport	Sep 2020 – May 2021
Shadow Spokesperson for Women and Equalities	The Baroness Thornton	May 2021 – July 2024

== Reshuffles and changes ==
Keir Starmer appointed his first shadow cabinet on 5 and 6 April 2020, and completed the appointment of shadow portfolios on 9 April 2020, opposition whips on 14 April 2020, and Parliamentary Private Secretaries (PPSs) on 14 May 2020.

=== 2020 ===
April

In the initial Shadow Transport team appointments, Mike Kane was Shadow Regional Transport Minister, Kerry McCarthy Shadow Green Transport and Aviation Minister, and Matt Rodda Shadow Buses Minister. Kane was subsequently appointed McCarthy's Aviation brief, alongside Maritime, and Rodda covered the Regional Transport brief.

Iain McNicol was originally appointed as an Opposition Whip in the Lords, but stood down on 15 April pending the results an investigation into his conduct following a leaked report.

Following a period of leave from the role, Tony Lloyd stood down as Shadow Northern Ireland Secretary on 28 April. He was succeeded by Louise Haigh, who was appointed to the position on an interim basis during his absence.

In late April, Party Chair Angela Rayner appointed Marsha de Cordova as Lead on Equality and Inclusion within the party, Tulip Siddiq as Parliamentary Lead on Party Development and Sam Tarry as Parliamentary Lead on Campaigns and Organisation.

May

Darren Jones stepped down as PPS to the Shadow Justice and Law Officer teams upon his election as Chair of the Business, Energy and Industrial Strategy Select Committee.

Rosie Duffield resigned as an opposition whip on 31 May after being found to have broken coronavirus lockdown rules.

June

Starmer sacked Shadow Education Secretary Rebecca Long-Bailey on 25 June, and announced Shadow Child Poverty Strategy Minister Kate Green as her replacement two days later.

July

Shadow Women and Equalities Minister Gill Furniss moved to become an opposition whip on 10 July, and was succeeded by Shadow Faiths Minister Janet Daby, who became Shadow Minister for Faiths, Women and Equalities.

Lloyd Russell-Moyle credited a "right-wing media campaign" for his resignation as Shadow Environment Minister on 16 July, and was replaced by Ruth Jones on 12 August. Charlotte Nichols succeeded Jones as PPS to the Shadow Northern Ireland Secretary, also remaining PPS to the Shadow International Trade Secretary.

September

After rebelling against the Labour whip on the Overseas Operations Bill, Olivia Blake, Nadia Whittome and Beth Winter resigned from their PPS posts on 24 September 2020.

October

Dan Carden resigned as Shadow Treasury Minister on 15 October, informing the leadership of his intention to vote against Labour whip on the Covert Human Intelligence Sources (Criminal Conduct) bill. Shadow Education Minister Margaret Greenwood and PPSs Mary Foy, Rachel Hopkins, Kim Johnson, Navendu Mishra and Sarah Owen also resigned later on the same date after rebelling against the Labour whip on the legislation. Owen had succeeded Beth Winter as PPS to the Shadow Chancellor of the Duchy of Lancaster earlier in the month. On 16 October, Wes Streeting was promoted to Shadow Education Minister, and James Murray and Abena Oppong-Asare became Shadow Treasury Ministers.

December

Janet Daby resigned as Shadow Faiths Minister on 7 December following her "misjudged" comments about registrars and same-sex partnerships.

Shadow Cultural Industries Minister Tracy Brabin announced she would be stepping down to focus on her candidacy for Mayor of West Yorkshire on 16 December. Shadow Sport Minister Alison McGovern was given the Cultural Industries brief, becoming Shadow Minister for Cultural Industries and Sport.

After voting against the Labour whip for the European Union future relationship bill on 30 December, Shadow Work & Pensions and Scotland PPS Tonia Antoniazzi, Opposition Whip Florence Eshalomi and Shadow Cabinet Office Minister Helen Hayes resigned from the front bench.

=== 2021 ===
January

In a minor reshuffle on 7 January, Shadow Pensions Minister Jack Dromey and PPS Fleur Anderson became Shadow Cabinet Office Ministers. Matt Rodda succeeded Dromey in the Pensions brief and Sam Tarry filled the vacancy left by Rodda in the Shadow Transport team.

February

Karin Smyth announced her intention to step down as Shadow Northern Ireland Minister on 26 February to focus on constituency work and other issues, and was replaced by PPS Alex Davies-Jones. Emma Hardy resigned as Shadow FE and Universities Minister for similar reasons on 8 March, and was succeeded by Opposition Whip Matt Western.

April

Sarah Owen announced that she had rejoined the opposition front bench on 14 April, returning to her former role as PPS to Shadow Chancellor of the Duchy of Lancaster Rachel Reeves.

Resigning Shadow Defence Procurement Minister in April 2021, Khalid Mahmoud revealed his departure from the front bench in an opinion piece criticising the party after the May 2021 local election results.

May

Starmer conducted a post-local election reshuffle from 8 to 9 May, which began with the sacking of Angela Rayner as Party Chair and Campaign Coordinator. However, she successfully negotiated a larger role as Shadow Chancellor of the Duchy of Lancaster and Shadow Secretary of State for the Future of Work. Rosena Allin-Khan, Rachel Reeves and Cat Smith received promotions, alongside Alan Campbell, Shabana Mahmood, Lucy Powell and Wes Streeting who joined the Shadow Cabinet. Allin-Khan and Smith became Secretaries of State for their previous portfolios, and Streeting was given the new position of Shadow Child Poverty Secretary. Anneliese Dodds and Thangam Debbonaire changed roles, but Nick Brown and Valerie Vaz left the opposition front bench. Dodds and Mahmood also replaced Jim McMahon and Jo Stevens as front bench Labour NEC representatives.

Carolyn Harris resigned as PPS to Starmer on 11 May following allegations of spreading rumours about Angela Rayner, and was succeeded by Shadow Defence Minister Sharon Hodgson on 14 May.

Shadow Local Government Minister Kate Hollern quit on 13 May after facing allegations of interfering in a sexual harassment complaint. She was replaced by Opposition Whip Jeff Smith in a wider front bench reshuffle on 14 May, which also saw changes including Bambos Charalambous and Holly Lynch switching roles, Mike Amesbury's brief being split with Ruth Cadbury, and Paul Blomfield leaving the front bench. Rachel Hopkins rejoined the front bench as PPS to Shadow Defence Secretary John Healey.

A House of Lords front bench reshuffle also took place in May, in which The Lord Kennedy of Southwark took over from The Lord McAvoy as Opposition Chief Whip. The Baroness Blake of Leeds joined the Housing, Communities and Local Government team, The Lord Coaker joined the Defence and Home Department teams, The Lord Khan of Burnley joined the DEFRA team, and The Baroness Merron joined the Health and Social Care team. All four had been newly appointed to the Lords and nominated by Starmer.

June

The Baroness Chapman of Darlington joined the shadow cabinet upon her appointment as a Shadow Minister of State for the Cabinet Office on 22 June, serving as the opposite number to The Lord Frost.

Tonia Antoniazzi announced her appointment as PPS to Shadow Chancellor of the Exchequer Rachel Reeves on 23 June.

August

In the wake of a mass-shooting in his constituency, Shadow Environment Secretary Luke Pollard announced his intention to "step back" from his role for a month on 30 August. Shadow Environment Minister Daniel Zeichner covered Pollard's portfolio in his absence.

September

Marsha de Cordova resigned as Shadow Women and Equalities Secretary on 14 September to focus on her constituency, and was replaced by Anneliese Dodds on 21 September. Shadow Women and Equalities Minister Charlotte Nichols also stepped down at the same time for "personal reasons" and was succeeded by Taiwo Owatemi.

Andy McDonald resigned as Shadow Secretary of State for Employment Rights and Protections on 27 September, without a successor.

October

On 20 October, The Lord Collins of Highbury succeeded The Baroness Hayter of Kentish Town as Shadow Deputy Leader of the House of Lords. Hayter stepped down to become Chair of the House of Lords' International Agreements Committee.

November

In a Shadow Cabinet reshuffle on 29 November 2021, Yvette Cooper returned to the front bench as Shadow Home Secretary. Pat McFadden joined the shadow cabinet as Shadow Chief Secretary to the Treasury as did Peter Kyle who became Shadow Secretary of State for Northern Ireland. Lord Falconer, Kate Green, Luke Pollard and Nia Griffith all left.

Most members of the Shadow Cabinet had their portfolios changed, with Lisa Nandy moving from Foreign Affairs to Shadow Secretary of State for Levelling Up, Housing and Communities (A combination of Housing and Communities and Local Government). Ed Miliband became the revived portfolio of Shadow Secretary of State for Climate Change and Net Zero, with the Business and Industrial Strategy part of his former portfolio going to Jonathan Reynolds. David Lammy took on Foreign Affairs and was replaced as Shadow Lord Chancellor by Steve Reed. Nick Thomas-Symonds became Shadow Secretary of State for International Trade, replacing Emily Thornberry who became Shadow Attorney General for England and Wales. Bridget Phillipson became Shadow Secretary of State for Education, Wes Streeting became Shadow Secretary of State for Health and Social Care, Jonathan Ashworth became Shadow Secretary of State for Work and Pensions, Lucy Powell became Shadow Secretary of State for Digital, Culture, Media and Sport and Jim McMahon became Shadow Secretary of State for Environment, Food and Rural Affairs, Louise Haigh was made Shadow Secretary of State for Transport and Jo Stevens was made Shadow Secretary of State for Wales.

The Shadow Secretary of States for Mental Health and International Development were demoted to shadow ministers, but still sitting in the shadow cabinet, at a rank similar to Shadow Chief Secretary to the Treasury. Preet Gill became Shadow Cabinet Minister for International Development under the Shadow Foreign Secretary and Rosena Allin-Khan became Shadow Cabinet Minister for Mental Health under the Shadow Health Secretary.

The position of Shadow Secretary of State for Housing was combined with Communities and Local Government to become the Shadow Secretary of State for Levelling Up, Housing and Communities, to shadow the government department of the same name. The positions of Shadow Secretary of State for Young People and Democracy, Shadow Secretary of State for Child Poverty and Shadow Secretary of State for Employment Rights and Protections were all abolished. The Shadow Secretary of State for Business, Energy and Industrial Strategy role was split into Shadow Secretary of State for Climate Change and Net Zero and Shadow Secretary of State for Business and Industrial Strategy.

Kerry McCarthy stepped down as Shadow Green Transport Minister for 'personal reasons'.

December

Appointments for Shadow Ministers, Spokespeople and PPSs were completed on 4 December.

Shadow Minister Rachael Maskell and PPS Mick Whitley resigned on 14 December, defying the party whip to oppose mandatory vaccination for NHS staff.

Kate Osborne was appointed PPS to the shadow Northern Ireland team on 21 December.

=== 2022 ===
January

- Debbie Abrahams joined the shadow Treasury team.
- Shadow Immigration Minister Jack Dromey died on 7 January.
- Navendu Mishra was appointed as a whip on 8 January.
- Gill Furniss was appointed Shadow Roads Minister, leaving the Whips' Office. Her brief covers green transport, transport decarbonisation, future transport and roads.
- The Lord Grantchester Leaves the Shadow Front Bench

February

Stephen Kinnock was appointed Shadow Immigration Minister on 3 February, and Luke Pollard returned to the front bench to replace him as Shadow Armed Forces Minister.

The Baroness Chapman of Darlington no longer an Opposition Whip 21/2/22

March

Barbara Keeley was appointed Shadow Arts and Civil Society Minister on 11 March, succeeding Rachael Maskell. Jeff Smith, another Shadow DCMS Minister, had covered the brief whilst the position was vacant.

April

Lord Watson of Invergowrie no longer Shadow Spokesman for Education 28 April 2022

May

Christian Wakeford was appointed Parliamentary Private Secretary to Bridget Phillipson, the shadow secretary of state for education.

The Baroness Chapman of Darlington replaces Baroness Sherlock as Shadow Education Spokesman

Baroness Thornton no longer Shadow Spokesman for Health 10 May 2022

June

The Baroness Chapman of Darlington no longer Shadow Spokesman for International trade 17 June 2022

Lord Tunnicliffe no longer Shadow Deputy Chief Whip 17 June 2022

Kerry McCarthy was appointed Shadow Climate Change Minister on 29 June, succeeding Olivia Blake who resigned citing personal reasons. Mike Amesbury resigns as Shadow Local Government Minister on 30 June.

July

Baroness Jones of Whitchurch no longer Shadow Spokesman for the Environment 21 July 2022

Stephanie Peacock replaces Chris Elmore as Shadow Minister for Media, Data and Digital Infrastructure 22 July 2022

Sam Tarry Sacked as Shadow Minister for Buses and Local Transport, for unauthorized media appearances related to the National Union of Rail, Maritime and Transport Workers strike.

September

Simon Lightwood was appointed Shadow Minister for Buses and Taxis at Labour Party conference.

Conor McGinn steps down as Deputy National Campaign Coordinator and Shadow Minister without Portfolio

Taiwo Owatemi Shadow Minister for Women & Equalities and Opposition Whip Resigned

October

Lord Stevenson of Balmacara appointed Shadow Spokesman for Culture, Media and Sport

Paula Barker replaces Sarah Owen as Shadow Minister for Homelessness and Rough Sleeping, Sarah Owen remains Shadow Minister for Faith

Yasmin Qureshi replaces Taiwo Owatemi as Shadow Minister for Women & Equalities

Tonia Antoniazzi appointed as an Opposition Whip

November

Christian Wakeford appointed as an Opposition Whip.

December

The Baroness Chapman of Darlington ceased to be an Opposition Whip in the House of Lords, she later became Chancellor of Teesside University.

=== 2023 ===
==== January ====
- Sarah Owen no longer an Opposition Whip
- Baroness Taylor of Stevenage was appointed as an opposition whip in the Lords.

==== February ====
===== 9 February =====
- Samantha Dixon replaces Debbie Abrahams as Parliamentary Private Secretary in the Treasury

===== 20 February =====
- Lord Rosser no longer Shadow Spokesman for Transport and Home Office
- The Baroness Chapman of Darlington no longer Shadow Spokesman for Education and Justice
- Lord Stevenson of Balmacara no longer Shadow Spokesman for Culture, Media and Sport
- The Baroness Wilcox of Newport no longer Shadow Spokesman for Work and Pensions
- Baroness Wheeler no longer Shadow Spokesman for Levelling Up

===== 21 February =====
- Baroness Twycross appointed Shadow Spokesman for Education and an Opposition Whip
- The Baroness Taylor of Stevenage appointed Shadow Spokesman for Transport and Levelling Up
- Baroness Thornton appointed Shadow Spokesman for Education and Work and Pensions
- Lord Lennie no longer Shadow Spokesman for Business, appointed Shadow Spokesman for Energy
- Lord Leong appointed Shadow Spokesman for Business and an Opposition Whip
- The Baroness Chapman of Darlington appointed Shadow Spokesman for Business and The Treasury
- The Baroness Smith of Basildon appointed Shadow Spokesman for the Foreign Office
- Lord Collins of Highbury appointed Shadow Spokesman for the Cabinet Office and Equalities
- Lord Kennedy of Southwark appointed Shadow Spokesman for the Cabinet Office
- Lord Stevenson of Balmacara appointed Shadow Spokesman for Science
- Jessica Morden appointed Parliamentary Private Secretary to the Leader of the Opposition replacing Sharon Hodgson

==== April ====
Lord Livermore appointed Shadow Spokesman for the Treasury and an Opposition Whip 17 April 2023

==== May ====
Lord Tunnicliffe no longer Shadow Spokesman for the Treasury 3/5/23

==== June ====
Bambos Charalambous was removed as Shadow Minister for the Middle East and North Africa after he was suspended from the party.

Wayne David replaces Bambos Charalambous at the Foreign Office.

==== September ====
2023 British shadow cabinet reshuffle

20 September

- Nav Mishra appointed Parliamentary Private Secretary to the Deputy Leader of the Opposition replacing Florence Eshalomi

==== October ====
26 October

- The Baroness Chapman of Darlington no longer Shadow Spokesperson for Business & Trade and the Treasury
- Baroness Blake no longer Shadow Spokesperson for Business & Trade
- Lord Kennedy of Southwark no longer Shadow Spokesperson for the Cabinet Office
- The Lord Collins of Highbury no longer Shadow Spokesperson for the Cabinet Office
- Baroness Merron no longer Shadow Spokesperson for Culture, Media & Sport
- Baroness Thornton no longer Shadow Spokesperson for Education and Work & Pensions
- The Baroness Anderson of Stoke-on-Trent no longer Shadow Spokesperson for Environment, Food & Rural Affairs
- The Baroness Smith of Basildon no longer Shadow Spokesperson for the Foreign Office and Scotland and Cabinet Office
- Baroness Hayman of Ullock no longer Shadow Spokesperson for Levelling Up, Housing & Communities
- The Baroness Taylor of Stevenage no longer Shadow Spokesperson for Transport
- lord Lennie no longer an Opposition Whip

27 October

- Lord McNicol appointed Shadow Spokesperson for Business & Trade and Scotland
- Baroness Thornton appointed Shadow Spokesperson for Culture, Media & Sport
- Lord Liddle appointed Shadow Spokesperson for Transport
- Baroness Jones of Whitchurch appointed Shadow Spokesperson for Science, Innovation & Technology

==== November ====
On 8 November 2023, Imran Hussain resigns as Shadow Minister for the New Deal for Working People from the opposition frontbench citing Keir Starmer's response to the Gaza war.

On 15 November 2023, Yasmin Qureshi resigned from the frontbench to vote for a SNP motion demanding a ceasefire in Gaza. Other MPs to resign included Afzal Khan and Paula Barker.

also resigned Jess Phillips, Sarah Owen, Rachel Hopkins, Naz Shah, Andy Slaughter

On 27 November 2023, Shadow Ministerial Appointments

- Tan Dhesi appointed Shadow Minister for Exports, replacing Afzal Khan
- Alex Davies-Jones appointed Shadow Minister for Domestic Violence and Safeguarding, replacing Jess Phillips
- Feryal Clark appointed Shadow Minister for Crime Reduction, replacing Naz Shah, Feryal Clark no longer Shadow Minister for Health
- Karl Turner appointed Shadow Solicitor General, replacing Andy Slaughter
- Liz Twist appointed Shadow Minister for Local Government, replacing Sarah Owen
- Baroness Sherlock appointed Shadow Minister for Faith, replacing Sarah Owen
- Jim McMahon appointed Shadow Minister for Devolution and the English Regions, replacing Paula Barker
- Steve McCabe appointed Shadow Minister for Veterans, replacing Rachel Hopkins
- Chris Evans appointed Shadow Minister for Tech and Digital Economy, replacing Alex Davies-Jones, Chris Evans no longer Shadow Minister for Social Security
- Michael Shanks appointed Shadow Minister of State for Scotland
- Ashley Dalton appointed Shadow Minister for Women and Equalities, replacing Yasmin Qureshi
- Lord Livermore appointed Shadow Exchequer Secretary, replacing Tan Dhesi, also no longer an Opposition Whip
- Jeff Smith appointed Opposition Whip (Senior Legislation Whip)

=== 2024 ===
==== January ====
- Alison McGovern appointed Shadow Minister for Social Security jointly with Employment
- Lord Hunt of Kings Heath appointed an Opposition whip

==== March ====
- 26 March – Keir Mather appointed an Opposition whip replacing Kim Leadbeater

== See also ==
- British Government frontbench
- Cabinet of the United Kingdom
- Frontbench Team of Ian Blackford
- Opposition frontbench of Jeremy Corbyn
- Leader of the Opposition (United Kingdom)
- List of British shadow cabinets
- Official Opposition Shadow Cabinet
- Parliamentary opposition
- Shadow Cabinet of Keir Starmer
- Shadow Cabinet
