= Opposition frontbench of Jeremy Corbyn =

The frontbench of Her Majesty's Loyal Opposition in the Parliament of the United Kingdom consists of the Shadow Cabinet and other shadow ministers of the political party currently serving as the Official Opposition. From 2015 to 2020, Her Majesty's Loyal Opposition was the Labour Party, and the Leader of the Opposition was Jeremy Corbyn.

Key

Member of the House of Commons
Member of the House of Lords
Privy Counsellor
Shadow Cabinet full members **in bold**
Shadow Cabinet attendees **in bold italics**

== Leader of the Opposition and Cabinet Office ==
Office of the Leader of the Opposition
Leader of Her Majesty's Most Loyal Opposition Leader of the Labour Party	**Jeremy Corbyn**	Sep 2015 – Apr 2020
Deputy Leader of Her Majesty's Most Loyal Opposition Deputy Leader of the Labour Party	**Tom Watson**	Sep 2015 – Dec 2019
Shadow First Secretary of State	**Angela Eagle**	Sep 2015 – Jun 2016
Shadow First Secretary of State	**Emily Thornberry**	Jun 2017 – Apr 2020
Chair of the Labour Party	**Tom Watson**	Sep 2015 – Jun 2017
Chair of the Labour Party	**Ian Lavery**	Jun 2017 – Apr 2020
Parliamentary Private Secretary to the Leader of the Opposition	Kate Osamor	Sep 2015 – Jan 2016
Parliamentary Private Secretary to the Leader of the Opposition	Steve Rotheram	Sep 2015 – May 2017
Parliamentary Private Secretary to the Leader of the Opposition	Kate Hollern	Jul 2017 – Jan 2020
Parliamentary Private Secretary to the Leader of the Opposition	Tanmanjeet Singh Dhesi	Jan 2020 – Apr 2020
Parliamentary Private Secretary to the Deputy Leader of the Opposition	Jo Stevens	Sep 2015 – Jan 2016
Parliamentary Private Secretary to the Deputy Leader of the Opposition	Jim McMahon	Jan 2016 – Oct 2016
Parliamentary Private Secretary to the Deputy Leader of the Opposition	Ruth Smeeth	2017 – Mar 2019

Cabinet Office
Shadow Minister for the Cabinet Office	**Tom Watson**	Sep 2015 – Oct 2016
Shadow Minister for the Cabinet Office	**Ian Lavery**	Oct 2016 – Feb 2017
Shadow Minister for the Cabinet Office	**Jon Trickett**	Feb 2017 – Apr 2020
Shadow Minister for Young People and Voter Registration	**Gloria De Piero**	Sep 2015 – Jun 2016
Shadow Minister for Voter Engagement and Youth Affairs	**Cat Smith**	Jun 2016 – Apr 2020
Shadow Minister without Portfolio	**Jonathan Ashworth**	Sep 2015 – Oct 2016
Shadow Minister without Portfolio	**Andrew Gwynne**	Oct 2016 – Jun 2017
Shadow Minister without Portfolio	**Ian Lavery**	Feb 2017 – Apr 2020
National Campaign Coordinator	**Jon Trickett**	Jul 2016 – Feb 2017
National Campaign Coordinator	**Ian Lavery**	Feb 2017 – Apr 2020
National Campaign Coordinator	**Andrew Gwynne**	Feb 2017 – Apr 2020
Shadow Minister for Civil Service and Digital Reform	Louise Haigh	Sep 2015 – Oct 2016
Shadow Minister for Civil Society	Anna Turley	Sep 2015 – Jun 2016
Shadow Minister for Trade Unions and Civil Society	Ian Lavery	Sep 2015 – Oct 2016
Shadow Minister for the Cabinet Office (junior)	Wayne David	Sep 2015 – Jun 2016
Shadow Minister for the Cabinet Office (junior)	Laura Smith	Jan 2018 – Jun 2018
Shadow Minister for the Cabinet Office (junior)	Jo Platt	Jul 2018 – Dec 2019
Shadow Minister for the Cabinet Office (junior)	Chris Matheson	Jan 2018 – Apr 2020
Shadow Minister for the Cabinet Office (junior)	Stephanie Peacock	Jan 2020 – Apr 2020
Parliamentary Private Secretary to the Shadow Cabinet Office Minister	Jo Stevens	Sep 2015 – Jan 2016
Parliamentary Private Secretary to the Shadow Cabinet Office Minister	Jim McMahon	Jan 2016 – Oct 2016
Parliamentary Private Secretary to the Shadow Cabinet Office Minister	Emma Dent Coad	Jan 2018 – Dec 2019
Shadow Spokesperson for the Cabinet Office	The Baroness Hayter of Kentish Town	Sep 2015 – Jun 2017
Shadow Spokesperson for the Cabinet Office	The Baroness Hayter of Kentish Town	Jun 2018 – Jul 2019
Shadow Spokesperson for the Cabinet Office	The Baroness Hayter of Kentish Town	Sep 2019 – Apr 2020
Shadow Spokesperson for the Cabinet Office	The Lord Hunt of Kings Heath	Jun 2017 – May 2018
Shadow Spokesperson for the Cabinet Office	The Baroness Smith of Basildon	Jun 2018 – Apr 2020

National Executive Committee
Front Bench Representative on the National Executive Committee of the Labour Party	Jonathan Ashworth	Sep 2015 – Oct 2016
Front Bench Representative on the National Executive Committee of the Labour Party	Angela Eagle	Sep 2015 – Jun 2016
Front Bench Representative on the National Executive Committee of the Labour Party	Rebecca Long-Bailey	Sep 2015 – Apr 2020
Front Bench Representative on the National Executive Committee of the Labour Party	Jon Trickett	Jul 2016 – Apr 2020
Front Bench Representative on the National Executive Committee of the Labour Party	Kate Osamor	Oct 2016 – Dec 2018
Front Bench Representative on the National Executive Committee of the Labour Party	Diane Abbott	Jan 2019 – Apr 2020

== Devolved and local government ==
Communities and Local Government (2015–18)
Housing, Communities and Local Government (2018–20)
Shadow Secretary of State for Communities and Local Government Shadow Minister for the Constitutional Convention	**Jon Trickett**	Sep 2015 – Jun 2016
Shadow Secretary of State for Communities and Local Government Shadow Minister for the Constitutional Convention	**Grahame Morris**	Jun 2016 – Oct 2016
Shadow Secretary of State for Communities and Local Government Shadow Minister for the Constitutional Convention	**Teresa Pearce** (acting)	Oct 2016 – May 2017
Shadow Secretary of State for Communities and Local Government	**Andrew Gwynne**	Jun 2017 – Jan 2018
Shadow Secretary of State for Housing, Communities and Local Government	**Andrew Gwynne**	Jan 2018 – Apr 2020
Shadow Minister for Communities	Stephen Morgan	Jul 2019 – Apr 2020
Shadow Minister for Devolution and Local Government	Emma Lewell-Buck	Jan 2016 – Jun 2016
Shadow Minister for Devolution and Local Government	Jim McMahon	Oct 2016 – Apr 2020
Shadow Minister for Local Government	Steve Reed	Sep 2015 – Jun 2016
Shadow Minister for Local Government	Roberta Blackman-Woods	Oct 2016 – Jul 2017
Shadow Minister for Local Government	Yvonne Fovargue	Jul 2017 – Mar 2019
Shadow Minister for London	Andy Slaughter	Oct 2016 – Jun 2017
Shadow Minister	Liz McInnes	Sep 2015 – Jun 2016
Shadow Minister	Kate Hollern	Oct 2016 – Apr 2020
Shadow Minister	Gareth Thomas	Oct 2016 – Jun 2017
Parliamentary Private Secretary	Paula Sherriff	Sep 2015 – Jan 2016
Parliamentary Private Secretary	Stephen Morgan	Jul 2017 – Jul 2019
Shadow Spokesperson	The Lord Beecham	Sep 2015 – Apr 2020
Shadow Spokesperson	The Lord Kennedy of Southwark	Sep 2015 – Apr 2020

Housing and Planning (2015–16)
Housing (2016–20)
Shadow Minister for Housing and Planning	**John Healey**	Sep 2015 – Jun 2016
Shadow Secretary of State for Housing	**John Healey**	Oct 2016 – Apr 2020
Shadow Minister for Housing	Roberta Blackman-Woods	Sep 2015 – Jun 2016
Shadow Minister for Housing	Roberta Blackman-Woods	Oct 2016 – Jul 2017
Shadow Minister for Housing	Teresa Pearce	Sep 2015 – Oct 2016
Shadow Minister for Housing	Ruth Cadbury	Oct 2016 – Jun 2017
Shadow Minister for Housing	Andy Slaughter	Oct 2016 – Jun 2017
Shadow Minister for Housing	Tony Lloyd	Jul 2017 – Jan 2018
Shadow Minister for Housing	Melanie Onn	Jul 2017 – Mar 2019
Shadow Minister for Housing	Sarah Jones	May 2018 – Apr 2020
Shadow Minister for Housing	Alex Cunningham	Apr 2019 – Apr 2020
Shadow Minister for Planning	Roberta Blackman-Woods	Jan 2018 – Dec 2019
Parliamentary Private Secretary	Matthew Pennycook	Sep 2015 – Jun 2016
Parliamentary Private Secretary	Chris Matheson	Oct 2016 – 2017
Parliamentary Private Secretary	Sarah Jones	Jan 2018 – May 2018
Parliamentary Private Secretary	James Frith	May 2018 – Dec 2019
Shadow Spokesperson for Housing	The Lord Beecham	Sep 2015 – Apr 2020
Shadow Spokesperson for Housing	The Lord Kennedy of Southwark	Sep 2015 – Apr 2020

Northern Ireland
Shadow Secretary of State for Northern Ireland	**Vernon Coaker**	Sep 2015 – Jun 2016
Shadow Secretary of State for Northern Ireland	**Dave Anderson**	Jun 2016 – May 2017
Shadow Secretary of State for Northern Ireland	**Owen Smith**	Jun 2017 – Mar 2018
Shadow Secretary of State for Northern Ireland	**Tony Lloyd**	Mar 2018 – Apr 2020
Shadow Minister for Northern Ireland	Stephen Pound	Sep 2015 – Dec 2019
Shadow Minister for Northern Ireland	Karin Smyth	Jul 2018 – Apr 2020
Parliamentary Private Secretary	Ruth Smeeth	Sep 2015 – Jun 2016
Shadow Spokesperson for Northern Ireland	The Lord McAvoy	Sep 2015 – Jan 2018
Shadow Spokesperson for Northern Ireland	The Baroness Smith of Basildon	Jun 2018 – Apr 2020

Scotland
Shadow Secretary of State for Scotland	**Ian Murray**	Sep 2015 – Jun 2016
Shadow Secretary of State for Scotland	**Dave Anderson**	Jul 2016 – May 2017
Shadow Secretary of State for Scotland	**Lesley Laird**	Jun 2017 – Dec 2019
Shadow Secretary of State for Scotland	**Tony Lloyd**	Dec 2019 – Apr 2020
Shadow Minister for Scotland	Wayne David	Sep 2015 – Jun 2016
Shadow Minister for Scotland	Paul Sweeney	Jul 2017 – Dec 2019
Parliamentary Private Secretary	Ruth Smeeth	Sep 2015 – Jun 2016
Shadow Spokesperson for Scotland	The Lord McAvoy	Sep 2015 – Jan 2018
Shadow Spokesperson for Scotland	The Lord Davidson of Glen Clova	Jun 2018 – Apr 2020

Wales
Shadow Secretary of State for Wales	**Nia Griffith**	Sep 2015 – Jun 2016
Shadow Secretary of State for Wales	**Paul Flynn**	Jul 2016 – Oct 2016
Shadow Secretary of State for Wales	**Jo Stevens**	Oct 2016 – Jan 2017
Shadow Secretary of State for Wales	**Christina Rees**	Feb 2017 – Apr 2020
Shadow Minister for Wales	Susan Elan Jones	Sep 2015 – Jun 2016
Shadow Minister for Wales	Gerald Jones	Oct 2016 – Jul 2017
Shadow Minister for Wales	Chris Ruane	Jul 2017 – Dec 2019
Parliamentary Private Secretary	Gerald Jones	Sep 2015 – Jun 2016
Parliamentary Private Secretary	Tonia Antoniazzi	Jan 2018 – Jun 2018
Shadow Spokesperson for Wales	The Baroness Morgan of Ely	Sep 2015 – May 2016
Shadow Spokesperson for Wales	The Baroness Morgan of Ely	Oct 2016 – Jan 2017
Shadow Spokesperson for Wales	The Lord Griffiths of Burry Port	Sep 2017 – Apr 2020

== Digital, culture, media and sport ==
Culture, Media and Sport (2015–17)
Digital, Culture, Media and Sport (2017–20)
Shadow Secretary of State for Culture, Media and Sport	**Michael Dugher**	Sep 2015 – Jan 2016
Shadow Secretary of State for Culture, Media and Sport	**Maria Eagle**	Jan 2016 – Jun 2016
Shadow Secretary of State for Culture, Media and Sport	**Kelvin Hopkins**	Jul 2016 – Oct 2016
Shadow Secretary of State for Culture, Media and Sport	**Tom Watson**	Oct 2016 – Jul 2017
Shadow Secretary of State for Digital, Culture, Media and Sport	**Tom Watson**	Jul 2017 – Dec 2019
Shadow Secretary of State for Digital, Culture, Media and Sport	**Tracy Brabin**	Jan 2020 – Apr 2020
Shadow Minister for Arts and Culture	Thangam Debbonaire	Jan 2016 – Jun 2016
Shadow Minister for Arts and Heritage	Kevin Brennan	Oct 2016 – Apr 2020
Shadow Minister for Culture and the Digital Economy	Chi Onwurah (Note: Joint with BIS (2015-16).)	Sep 2015 – Oct 2016
Shadow Minister for Civil Society	Steve Reed	Oct 2016 – Jun 2019
Shadow Minister for Civil Society	Vicky Foxcroft	Jun 2019 – Apr 2020
Shadow Minister for the Digital Economy	Louise Haigh	Oct 2016 – Jul 2017
Shadow Minister for Digital	Liam Byrne	Jul 2017 – Apr 2020
Shadow Minister for Sport and Tourism	Clive Efford	Sep 2015 – Jun 2016
Shadow Minister for Sport	Rosena Allin-Khan	Oct 2016 – Jan 2020
Shadow Minister for Sport	Catherine West	Jan 2020 – Apr 2020
Parliamentary Private Secretary	Tulip Siddiq	Sep 2015 – Oct 2016
Parliamentary Private Secretary	Ruth Smeeth	2017 – Mar 2019
Shadow Spokesperson	The Lord Stevenson of Balmacara	Sep 2015 – Jun 2017
Shadow Spokesperson	The Lord Griffiths of Burry Port	Jun 2017 – Apr 2020

== Economy ==
Treasury
Shadow Chancellor of the Exchequer	**John McDonnell**	Sep 2015 – Apr 2020
Shadow Chief Secretary to the Treasury	**Seema Malhotra**	Sep 2015 – Jun 2016
Shadow Chief Secretary to the Treasury	**Rebecca Long-Bailey**	Jun 2016 – Feb 2017
Shadow Chief Secretary to the Treasury	**Peter Dowd**	Feb 2017 – Apr 2020
Shadow Financial Secretary to the Treasury	Rob Marris	Sep 2015 – Jun 2016
Shadow Financial Secretary to the Treasury	Peter Dowd	Oct 2016 – Feb 2017
Shadow Financial Secretary to the Treasury	Anneliese Dodds	Jul 2017 – Apr 2020
Shadow Economic Secretary to the Treasury Shadow City Minister	Richard Burgon	Sep 2015 – Jun 2016
Shadow Economic Secretary to the Treasury Shadow City Minister	Jonathan Reynolds	Oct 2016 – Apr 2020
Shadow Exchequer Secretary to the Treasury	Rebecca Long-Bailey	Sep 2015 – Jun 2016
Shadow Exchequer Secretary to the Treasury	Lyn Brown	Jan 2018 – Apr 2020
Shadow Minister for Sustainable Economics	Clive Lewis	Jan 2018 – Apr 2020
Parliamentary Private Secretary to the Shadow Chancellor	Peter Dowd	Sep 2015 – Oct 2016
Parliamentary Private Secretary to the Shadow Chancellor	Naz Shah	Feb 2016 – Apr 2016
Parliamentary Private Secretary to the Shadow Chancellor	Karen Lee	Jul 2017 – Jan 2018
Parliamentary Private Secretary to the Shadow Chancellor	Thelma Walker	Jan 2018 – Dec 2019
Parliamentary Private Secretary to the Shadow Chief Secretary	Julie Cooper	Sep 2015 – Oct 2016
Shadow Spokesperson for the Treasury	The Lord Davidson of Glen Clova	Sep 2015 – Apr 2020
Shadow Spokesperson for the Treasury	The Lord Davies of Oldham	Sep 2015 – Apr 2020
Shadow Spokesperson for the Treasury	The Lord Tunnicliffe	Sep 2015 – Apr 2020

Business, Innovation and Skills (2015–16)
Business, Energy and Industrial Strategy (2016–20)
Shadow Secretary of State for Business, Innovation and Skills	**Angela Eagle**	Sep 2015 – Jun 2016
Shadow Secretary of State for Business, Innovation and Skills	**Jon Trickett**	Jul 2016 – Jul 2016
Shadow Secretary of State for Business, Energy and Industrial Strategy	**Jon Trickett**	Jul 2016 – Oct 2016
Shadow Secretary of State for Business, Energy and Industrial Strategy	**Clive Lewis**	Oct 2016 – Feb 2017
Shadow Secretary of State for Business, Energy and Industrial Strategy	**Rebecca Long-Bailey**	Feb 2017 – Apr 2020
Shadow Secretary of State for Employment Rights	**Laura Pidcock**	Sep 2019 – Dec 2019
Shadow Secretary of State for Employment Rights	**Rachael Maskell**	Jan 2020 – Apr 2020
Shadow Minister for Climate Justice and Green Jobs	Danielle Rowley	Jun 2019 – Dec 2019
Shadow Minister for Consumer Affairs and Science	Yvonne Fovargue	Sep 2015 – Jun 2016
Shadow Minister for Energy and Climate Change	Alan Whitehead	Oct 2016 – Apr 2020
Shadow Minister for Further Education and Skills (Note: Joint with Business, Innovation and Skills and Education (2015-16).)	Gordon Marsden	Sept 2015 – Oct 2016
Shadow Minister for Industrial Strategy	Chi Onwurah (Science and Innovation)	Sep 2015 – Apr 2020
Shadow Minister for International Climate Change	Barry Gardiner	Jul 2016 – Apr 2020
Shadow Minister for Labour	Jack Dromey	Oct 2016 – Jan 2018
Shadow Minister for Labour	Laura Pidcock	Jan 2018 – Nov 2019
Shadow Minister for Labour	Justin Madders (acting)	Jul 2018 – Mar 2019
Shadow Minister for Labour	The Baroness Hayter of Kentish Town	Sep 2019 – Apr 2020
Shadow Minister for Small Business	Bill Esterson	Sep 2015 – Apr 2020
Shadow Minister for Steel, Postal Affairs and Consumer Protection	Gill Furniss	Oct 2016 – Apr 2020
Shadow Minister for Trade and Industry	Stephen Doughty	Jun 2015 – Oct 2015
Shadow Minister for Trade, Investment and Intellectual Property	Kevin Brennan	Sep 2015 – Jun 2016
Parliamentary Private Secretary	Stephen Kinnock	Sep 2015 – Jun 2016
Parliamentary Private Secretary	Dan Carden	Jul 2017 – Jan 2018
Parliamentary Private Secretary	Bambos Charalambous	Jan 2018 – Jan 2020
Shadow Spokesperson for Business, Innovation and Skills Shadow Spokesperson for Business, Energy and Industrial Strategy	The Lord Stevenson of Balmacara	Sep 2015 – Jun 2017
Shadow Spokesperson for Business, Innovation and Skills Shadow Spokesperson for Business, Energy and Industrial Strategy	The Baroness Hayter of Kentish Town	Sep 2015 – Jul 2019
Shadow Spokesperson for Business, Innovation and Skills Shadow Spokesperson for Business, Energy and Industrial Strategy	The Lord Mendelsohn	May 2015 – Jan 2018
Shadow Spokesperson for Energy and Climate Change	The Lord Grantchester	Jul 2016 – Apr 2020

== Environment ==
Energy and Climate Change (2015–16)
Shadow Secretary of State for Energy and Climate Change	**Lisa Nandy**	Sep 2015 – Jun 2016
Shadow Secretary of State for Energy and Climate Change	**Barry Gardiner**	Jun 2016 – Jul 2016
Shadow Minister for Energy and Climate Change	Barry Gardiner	Sep 2015 – Jun 2016
Shadow Minister for Energy and Climate Change	Alan Whitehead	Sep 2015 – Jun 2016
Shadow Minister for Energy and Climate Change	Clive Lewis	Sep 2015 – Jun 2016
Parliamentary Private Secretary	Harry Harpham	Sep 2015 – Oct 2015
Parliamentary Private Secretary	Gill Furniss	May 2016 – Oct 2016
Shadow Spokesperson for Energy and Climate Change	The Lord Grantchester	Sep 2015 – Jul 2016
Shadow Spokesperson for Energy and Climate Change	The Baroness Worthington	Sep 2015 – Nov 2015

Environment, Food and Rural Affairs
Shadow Secretary of State for Environment, Food and Rural Affairs	**Kerry McCarthy**	Sep 2015 – Jun 2016
Shadow Secretary of State for Environment, Food and Rural Affairs	**Rachael Maskell**	Jun 2016 – Feb 2017
Shadow Secretary of State for Environment, Food and Rural Affairs	**Sue Hayman**	Feb 2017 – Dec 2019
Shadow Secretary of State for Environment, Food and Rural Affairs	**Luke Pollard**	Jan 2020 – Apr 2020
Shadow Minister for the Natural Environment	Alex Cunningham	Sep 2015 – Jun 2016
Shadow Minister for Farming and Rural Communities	Mary Glindon	Oct 2016 – Jul 2017
Shadow Minister for Farming and Rural Communities	David Drew	Jul 2017 – Dec 2019
Shadow Minister for Farming and Rural Communities	Daniel Zeichner	Jan 2020 – Apr 2020
Shadow Minister for Flooding and Costal Communities	Sue Hayman	Oct 2016 – Feb 2017
Shadow Minister for Flooding and Costal Communities	Holly Lynch	Jul 2017 – Jul 2018
Shadow Minister for Flooding and Costal Communities	Luke Pollard	Jul 2018 – Jan 2020
Shadow Minister for Flooding and Costal Communities	Ruth Jones	Jan 2020 – Apr 2020
Shadow Minister for Waste and Recycling	Sandy Martin	Oct 2018 – Dec 2019
Shadow Minister for Waste and Recycling	Alan Whitehead	Jan 2020 – Apr 2020
Shadow Minister for Environment, Food and Rural Affairs	Nick Smith	Sep 2015 – Oct 2016
Shadow Minister for Environment, Food and Rural Affairs	Alan Whitehead	Oct 2016 – Apr 2020
Parliamentary Private Secretary	Colleen Fletcher	Sep 2015 – Jun 2016
Parliamentary Private Secretary	Chris Matheson	Oct 2016 – Jul 2017
Parliamentary Private Secretary	Luke Pollard	Jul 2017 – Jul 2018
Parliamentary Private Secretary	Abena Oppong-Asare	Jan 2020 – Apr 2020
Shadow Spokesperson for Environment, Food and Rural Affairs	The Lord Grantchester	Sep 2015 – Apr 2020
Shadow Spokesperson for Environment, Food and Rural Affairs	The Baroness Jones of Whitchurch	Sep 2015 – Apr 2020

== Foreign relations ==
Foreign and Commonwealth Affairs
Shadow Secretary of State for Foreign and Commonwealth Affairs	**Hilary Benn**	Sep 2015 – Jun 2016
Shadow Secretary of State for Foreign and Commonwealth Affairs	**Emily Thornberry**	Jun 2016 – Apr 2020
Shadow Minister for the Americas, Far East and Overseas Territories	Lloyd Russell-Moyle	Jan 2020 – Apr 2020
Shadow Minister for Europe	Pat McFadden	Sep 2015 – Jan 2016
Shadow Minister for Europe	Pat Glass	Jan 2016 – Jun 2016
Shadow Minister for Europe	Fabian Hamilton	Jun 2016 – Jul 2016
Shadow Minister for Europe	Khalid Mahmood	Oct 2016 – Apr 2020
Shadow Minister for the Middle East	Fabian Hamilton	Jun 2017 – Apr 2020
Shadow Minister for Peace and Disarmament (Note: Joint with Defence and FCO)	Fabian Hamilton	Nov 2016 – Apr 2020
Shadow Minister for South Asia, Sub-Saharan Africa and the Commonwealth	Stephen Doughty	Oct 2015 – Jan 2016
Shadow Minister for South Asia, Sub-Saharan Africa and the Commonwealth	Fabian Hamilton	Jan 2016 – Jul 2016
Shadow Minister for South Asia, Sub-Saharan Africa and the Commonwealth	Liz McInnes	Oct 2016 – Dec 2019
Shadow Minister for South Asia, Sub-Saharan Africa and the Commonwealth	Afzal Khan	Jan 2020 – Apr 2020
Shadow Minister for Foreign and Commonwealth Affairs	David Hanson	Sep 2015 – Oct 2015
Shadow Minister for Foreign and Commonwealth Affairs	Diana Johnson	Sep 2015 – Jun 2016
Shadow Minister for Foreign and Commonwealth Affairs	Catherine West	Sep 2015 – Jun 2017
Shadow Minister for Foreign and Commonwealth Affairs	Helen Goodman	Jul 2017 – Dec 2019
Parliamentary Private Secretary	Paul Blomfield	Sep 2015 – Jun 2016
Parliamentary Private Secretary	Danielle Rowley	Jul 2017 – Jun 2019
Parliamentary Private Secretary	Alex Sobel	Aug 2019 – Apr 2020
Shadow Spokesperson for Foreign and Commonwealth Affairs	The Baroness Morgan of Ely	Sep 2015 – May 2016
Shadow Spokesperson for Foreign and Commonwealth Affairs	The Lord Collins of Highbury	Sep 2015 – Apr 2020

International Development
Shadow Secretary of State for International Development	**Diane Abbott**	Sep 2015 – Jun 2016
Shadow Secretary of State for International Development	**Kate Osamor**	Jun 2016 – Dec 2018
Shadow Secretary of State for International Development	**Dan Carden**	Dec 2018 – Apr 2020
Shadow Minister for International Development	Mike Kane	Sep 2015 – Jun 2016
Shadow Minister for International Development	Imran Hussain	Jan 2016 – Jul 2017
Shadow Minister for International Development	Roberta Blackman-Woods	Jul 2017 – Jan 2018
Shadow Minister for International Development	Dan Carden	Jan 2018 – Dec 2018
Shadow Minister for International Development	Preet Gill	Jan 2018 – Apr 2020
Shadow Minister for International Development	Alex Norris	Mar 2019 – Apr 2020
Parliamentary Private Secretary	Imran Hussain	Sep 2015 – Jan 2016
Parliamentary Private Secretary	Ellie Reeves	Feb 2018 – Jun 2018
Parliamentary Private Secretary	Zarah Sultana	Jan 2020 – Apr 2020
Shadow Spokesperson for International Development	The Lord Collins of Highbury	Sep 2015 – Apr 2020

International Trade
Shadow Secretary of State for International Trade	**Barry Gardiner**	Jul 2016 – Apr 2020
Shadow Minister for International Trade	Bill Esterson	Oct 2016 – Apr 2020
Shadow Minister for International Trade	Judith Cummins	Jan 2018 – Apr 2020
Parliamentary Private Secretary	Anna McMorrin	Jan 2018 – Jun 2018
Shadow Spokesperson for International Trade	The Lord Mendelsohn	Jul 2016 – Jan 2018
Shadow Spokesperson for International Trade	The Lord Stevenson of Balmacara	May 2019 – Apr 2020

Exiting the European Union
Shadow Secretary of State for Exiting the European Union	**Emily Thornberry**	Jul 2016 – Oct 2016
Shadow Secretary of State for Exiting the European Union	**Keir Starmer**	Oct 2016 – Apr 2020
Shadow Minister for Exiting the European Union	Matthew Pennycook	Oct 2016 – Sep 2019
Shadow Minister for Exiting the European Union	Jenny Chapman	Oct 2016 – Dec 2019
Shadow Minister for Exiting the European Union	Paul Blomfield	Oct 2016 – Apr 2020
Shadow Minister for Exiting the European Union	Thangam Debbonaire	Jan 2020 – Apr 2020
Parliamentary Private Secretary	Karin Smyth	Oct 2016 – Jul 2017
Parliamentary Private Secretary	Emma Hardy	Jul 2017 – Jan 2020
Shadow Spokesperson for Exiting the European Union	The Baroness Hayter of Kentish Town	Jul 2016 – Jul 2019
Shadow Spokesperson for Exiting the European Union	The Baroness Hayter of Kentish Town	Sep 2019 – Jan 2020

== Law and order ==
Defence
Shadow Secretary of State for Defence	**Maria Eagle**	Sep 2015 – Jan 2016
Shadow Secretary of State for Defence	**Emily Thornberry**	Jan 2016 – Jun 2016
Shadow Secretary of State for Defence	**Clive Lewis**	Jun 2016 – Oct 2016
Shadow Secretary of State for Defence	**Nia Griffith**	Oct 2016 – Apr 2020
Shadow Minister for the Armed Forces	Kevan Jones	Sep 2015 – Jan 2016
Shadow Minister for the Armed Forces	Kate Hollern	Jan 2016 – Oct 2016
Shadow Minister for the Armed Forces and Defence Procurement	Wayne David	Oct 2016 – Jan 2020
Shadow Minister for Defence Procurement	Stephen Morgan	Jan 2020 – Apr 2020
Shadow Minister for Peace and Disarmament (Note: Joint with Defence and FCO)	Fabian Hamilton	Nov 2016 – Apr 2020
Shadow Minister for Veterans	Rachael Maskell	Sep 2015 – Jun 2016
Shadow Minister for Veterans	Gerald Jones	Jul 2017 – Apr 2020
Shadow Minister for Defence	Toby Perkins	Sep 2015 – Jun 2016
Parliamentary Private Secretary	Gerald Jones	Sep 2015 – Jun 2016
Parliamentary Private Secretary	Fiona Onasanya	Jul 2017 – Jan 2018
Parliamentary Private Secretary	Ged Killen	Feb 2018 – Jun 2018
Shadow Spokesperson for Defence	The Lord Touhig	Sep 2015 – Oct 2017
Shadow Spokesperson for Defence	The Lord Tunnicliffe	Oct 2016 – Apr 2020

Home Affairs
Shadow Secretary of State for the Home Department	**Andy Burnham**	Sep 2015 – Oct 2016
Shadow Secretary of State for the Home Department	**Diane Abbott**	Oct 2016 – Apr 2020
Shadow Secretary of State for the Home Department	**Lyn Brown** (acting)	Jun 2017 – Jun 2017
Shadow Minister for Crime Reduction	Lyn Brown	Sep 2015 – Jun 2016
Shadow Minister for Crime Reduction	Rupa Huq	Oct 2016 – May 2017
Shadow Minister for Fire and Emergency Services	Chris Williamson	Jul 2017 – Jan 2018
Shadow Minister for Fire and Emergency Services	Karen Lee	Jan 2018 – Dec 2019
Shadow Minister for Immigration	Keir Starmer	Sep 2015 – Jun 2016
Shadow Minister for Immigration	Afzal Khan	Jul 2017 – Jan 2020
Shadow Minister for Immigration	Bell Ribeiro-Addy	Jan 2020 – Apr 2020
Shadow Minister for Policing	Jack Dromey	Sep 2015 – Jun 2016
Shadow Minister for Policing	Lyn Brown	Oct 2016 – Jun 2017
Shadow Minister for Policing	Louise Haigh	Jul 2017 – Apr 2020
Shadow Minister for Preventing Abuse	Sarah Champion	Sep 2015 – Jun 2016
Shadow Minister for Safeguarding	Sarah Champion	Jul 2016 – Oct 2016
Shadow Minister for Safeguarding	Carolyn Harris	Oct 2016 – Jul 2017
Shadow Minister for Security	Nick Thomas-Symonds	Jul 2017 – Apr 2020
Parliamentary Private Secretary	Carolyn Harris	Sep 2015 – Oct 2016
Parliamentary Private Secretary	Elanor Smith	2017 – Dec 2019
Parliamentary Private Secretary	Kate Osborne	Jan 2020 – Apr 2020
Shadow Spokesperson for Home Affairs	The Lord Kennedy of Southwark	Sep 2015 – Apr 2020
Shadow Spokesperson for Home Affairs	The Lord Rosser	Sep 2015 – Apr 2020

Justice
Shadow Secretary of State for Justice Shadow Lord Chancellor	**The Lord Falconer of Thoroton**	Sep 2015 – Jun 2016
Shadow Secretary of State for Justice Shadow Lord Chancellor	**Richard Burgon**	Jun 2016 – Apr 2020
Shadow Minister for Prisons	Jenny Chapman	Sep 2015 – Jan 2016
Shadow Minister for Prisons	Jo Stevens	Jan 2016 – Oct 2016
Shadow Minister for Prisons	Imran Hussain	Jul 2017 – Apr 2020
Shadow Minister for Courts and Legal Aid	Andy Slaughter	Sep 2015 – Jun 2016
Shadow Minister for Courts and Legal Aid	Christina Rees	Jan 2016 – Jun 2016
Shadow Minister for Courts and Legal Aid	Christina Rees	Oct 2016 – Feb 2017
Shadow Minister for Courts and Legal Aid	Yasmin Qureshi	Oct 2016 – Apr 2020
Shadow Minister for Justice	Wayne David	Sep 2015 – Jun 2016
Shadow Minister for Justice	Karl Turner	Sep 2015 – Jan 2016
Shadow Minister for Justice	Gloria De Piero	Jul 2017 – Jul 2019
Shadow Minister for Justice	Bambos Charalambous	Jan 2020 – Apr 2020
Parliamentary Private Secretary	Christina Rees	Sep 2015 – Jan 2016
Parliamentary Private Secretary	Chris Matheson	Jan 2016 – Jul 2016
Parliamentary Private Secretary	Lloyd Russell-Moyle	Jul 2017 – Jan 2020
Parliamentary Private Secretary	Rachel Hopkins	Mar 2020 – Apr 2020
Shadow Spokesperson for Justice	The Lord Bach	Sep 2015 – May 2016
Shadow Spokesperson for Justice	The Lord Beecham	Sep 2015 – Apr 2020

Law Officers
Shadow Attorney General for England and Wales Shadow Advocate General for Northern Ireland	**Catherine McKinnell**	Sep 2015 – Jan 2016
Shadow Attorney General for England and Wales Shadow Advocate General for Northern Ireland	**Karl Turner**	Jan 2016 – Jun 2016
Shadow Attorney General for England and Wales Shadow Advocate General for Northern Ireland	**The Baroness Chakrabarti**	Oct 2016 – Apr 2020
Shadow Solicitor General for England and Wales	Karl Turner	Sep 2015 – Jan 2016
Shadow Solicitor General for England and Wales	Jo Stevens	Jan 2016 – Oct 2016
Shadow Solicitor General for England and Wales	Nick Thomas-Symonds	Oct 2016 – Apr 2020
Shadow Advocate General for Scotland	The Lord Davidson of Glen Clova	Sep 2015 – Apr 2020

== Parliament ==
House Leaders
Shadow Leader of the House of Commons	**Chris Bryant**	Sep 2015 – Jun 2016
Shadow Leader of the House of Commons	**Paul Flynn**	Jul 2016 – Oct 2016
Shadow Leader of the House of Commons	**Valerie Vaz**	Oct 2016 – Apr 2020
Shadow Lord President of the Council	**Jon Trickett**	Jun 2016 – Apr 2020
Shadow Deputy Leader of the House of Commons	Melanie Onn	Sep 2015 – Jun 2016
Shadow Deputy Leader of the House of Commons	Cat Smith	Dec 2016 – Jul 2017
Shadow Deputy Leader of the House of Commons	Karin Smyth	Jul 2017 – Apr 2020
Parliamentary Private Secretary	Neil Coyle	Sep 2015 – Jun 2016
Leader of the Opposition in the House of Lords	**The Baroness Smith of Basildon**	Sep 2015 – Apr 2020
Deputy Leader of the Opposition in the House of Lords	The Lord Hunt of Kings Heath	Sep 2015 – Jun 2017
Deputy Leader of the Opposition in the House of Lords	The Baroness Hayter of Kentish Town	Jun 2017 – Apr 2020

House of Commons Whips
Opposition Chief Whip in the House of Commons	**Rosie Winterton**	Sep 2015 – Oct 2016
Opposition Chief Whip in the House of Commons	**Nick Brown**	Oct 2016 – Apr 2020
Opposition Deputy Chief Whip in the House of Commons	Alan Campbell	Sep 2015 – Apr 2020
Opposition Pairing Whip in the House of Commons	Mark Tami	Sep 2015 – Apr 2020
Opposition Whip in the House of Commons	Judith Cummins	Sep 2015 – Jan 2018
Opposition Whip in the House of Commons	Vicky Foxcroft	Sep 2015 – Jun 2019
Opposition Whip in the House of Commons	Sue Hayman	Sep 2015 – Oct 2016
Opposition Whip in the House of Commons	Holly Lynch	Sep 2015 – Oct 2016
Opposition Whip in the House of Commons	Conor McGinn	Sep 2015 – Oct 2016
Opposition Whip in the House of Commons	Conor McGinn	Jan 2020 – Apr 2020
Opposition Whip in the House of Commons	Jessica Morden	Sep 2015 – Apr 2020
Opposition Whip in the House of Commons	Grahame Morris	Sep 2015 – Jun 2016
Opposition Whip in the House of Commons	Angela Rayner	Sep 2015 – Jan 2016
Opposition Whip in the House of Commons	Jeff Smith	Sep 2015 – Apr 2020
Opposition Whip in the House of Commons	David Anderson	Jan 2016 – Jun 2016
Opposition Whip in the House of Commons	Nic Dakin	Oct 2016 – Dec 2019
Opposition Whip in the House of Commons	Thangam Debbonaire	Oct 2016 – Apr 2020
Opposition Whip in the House of Commons	Chris Elmore	Oct 2016 – Apr 2020
Opposition Whip in the House of Commons	Nick Smith	Oct 2016 – Nov 2019
Opposition Whip in the House of Commons	Karl Turner	Oct 2016 – Jul 2017
Opposition Whip in the House of Commons	Fiona Onasanya	Jan 2018 – Dec 2018
Opposition Whip in the House of Commons	Stephanie Peacock	Jan 2018 – Mar 2019
Opposition Whip in the House of Commons	Helen Hayes	Jan 2020 – Apr 2020
Opposition Whip in the House of Commons	Alex Norris	Feb 2020 – Apr 2020
Opposition Whip in the House of Commons	Matt Western	Feb 2020 – Apr 2020

House of Lords Whips
Opposition Chief Whip in the House of Lords	**The Lord Bassam of Brighton**	Sep 2015 – Jan 2018
Opposition Chief Whip in the House of Lords	**The Lord McAvoy**	Jan 2018 – Apr 2020
Opposition Deputy Chief Whip in House of Lords	The Lord McAvoy	Sep 2015 – Jan 2018
Opposition Deputy Chief Whip in House of Lords	The Lord Tunnicliffe	Sep 2015 – Apr 2020
Opposition Deputy Chief Whip in House of Lords	The Baroness Wheeler	Jan 2018 – Apr 2020
Senior Opposition Whip in the House of Lords	The Baroness Sherlock	Sep 2015 – Apr 2020
Senior Opposition Whip in the House of Lords	The Baroness Wheeler	Sep 2015 – Jan 2018
Opposition Whip in the House of Lords	The Lord Collins of Highbury	Sep 2015 – Apr 2020
Opposition Whip in the House of Lords	The Lord Grantchester	Sep 2015 – Apr 2020
Opposition Whip in the House of Lords	The Lord Kennedy of Southwark	Sep 2015 – Apr 2020
Opposition Whip in the House of Lords	The Baroness Morgan of Ely	Sep 2015 – May 2016
Opposition Whip in the House of Lords	The Lord Stevenson of Balmacara	Sep 2015 – Apr 2020
Opposition Whip in the House of Lords	The Lord Touhig	Sep 2015 – Sep 2016
Opposition Whip in the House of Lords	The Lord Lennie	Oct 2016 – Apr 2020
Opposition Whip in the House of Lords	The Lord Griffiths of Burry Port	Sep 2017 – Apr 2020
Opposition Whip in the House of Lords	The Lord McNicol of West Kilbride	Sep 2018 – Apr 2020

== Social services ==
Education
Shadow Secretary of State for Education	**Lucy Powell**	Sep 2015 – Jun 2016
Shadow Secretary of State for Education	**Pat Glass**	Jun 2016 – Jun 2016
Shadow Secretary of State for Education	**Angela Rayner**	Jul 2016 – Apr 2020
Shadow Minister for Children and Families	Sharon Hodgson	Sep 2015 – Jun 2016
Shadow Minister for Children and Families	Emma Lewell-Buck	Oct 2016 – Mar 2019
Shadow Minister for Children and Families	Steve Reed	Jun 2019 – Apr 2020
Shadow Minister for Early Years	Pat Glass	Sep 2015 – Jan 2016
Shadow Minister for Early Years	Jenny Chapman	Jan 2016 – Jun 2016
Shadow Minister for Early Years	Tulip Siddiq	Oct 2016 – Jan 2017
Shadow Minister for Early Years	Tulip Siddiq	Jan 2020 – Apr 2020
Shadow Minister for Early Years	Tracy Brabin	Jul 2017 – Jan 2020
Shadow Minister for Higher Education, Further Education and Skills (Note: Joint with Business, Innovation and Skills and Education (2015-16).)	Gordon Marsden	Sep 2015 – Dec 2019
Shadow Minister for Higher Education, Further Education and Skills	Emma Hardy	Jan 2020 – Apr 2020
Shadow Minister for Schools	Nic Dakin	Sep 2015 – Jun 2016
Shadow Minister for Schools	Mike Kane	Oct 2016 – Apr 2020
Parliamentary Private Secretary	Jess Phillips	Sep 2015 – Jun 2016
Parliamentary Private Secretary	Jo Platt	Jul 2017 – Jul 2018
Parliamentary Private Secretary	Navendu Mishra	Jan 2020 – Apr 2020
Shadow Spokesperson for Education	The Lord Watson of Invergowrie	Sep 2015 – Apr 2020
Shadow Spokesperson for Education	The Lord Stevenson of Balmacara	Jul 2016 – Jun 2017
Shadow Spokesperson for Education	The Lord Hunt of Kings Heath	Jun 2017 – May 2018
Shadow Spokesperson for Education	The Lord Bassam of Brighton	Mar 2019 – Apr 2020

Health (2015–18)
Health and Social Care (2018–20)
Shadow Secretary of State for Health	**Heidi Alexander**	Sep 2015 – Jun 2016
Shadow Secretary of State for Health	**Diane Abbott**	Jun 2016 – Oct 2016
Shadow Secretary of State for Health	**Jonathan Ashworth**	Oct 2016 – Jan 2018
Shadow Secretary of State for Health and Social care	**Jonathan Ashworth**	Jan 2018 – Apr 2020
Shadow Minister for Mental Health	**Luciana Berger**	Sep 2015 – Jun 2016
Shadow Minister for Mental Health and Social Care	**Barbara Keeley**	Oct 2016 – Apr 2020
Shadow Minister for Community Health	Julie Cooper	Oct 2016 – Dec 2019
Shadow Minister for Mental Health and Social Care (junior)	Paula Sherriff	Jan 2018 – Dec 2019
Shadow Minister for Older People, Social Care and Carers	Barbara Keeley	Sept 2015 – Jun 2016
Shadow Minister for Public Health	Andrew Gwynne	Sep 2015 – Jun 2016
Shadow Minister for Public Health	Sharon Hodgson	Oct 2016 – Apr 2020
Shadow Minister	Justin Madders	Sep 2015 – Mar 2019
Parliamentary Private Secretary	Karin Smyth	Sep 2015 – Jun 2016
Parliamentary Private Secretary	Alex Norris	Jul 2017 – Mar 2019
Shadow Spokesperson	The Lord Hunt of Kings Heath	Sep 2015 – Nov 2017
Shadow Spokesperson	The Lord Hunt of Kings Heath	Jan 2018 – May 2018
Shadow Spokesperson	The Baroness Thornton	Nov 2017 – Apr 2020
Shadow Spokesperson	The Baroness Wheeler	Jun 2018 – Apr 2020

Work and Pensions
Shadow Secretary of State for Work and Pensions	**Owen Smith**	Sep 2015 – Jun 2016
Shadow Secretary of State for Work and Pensions	**Debbie Abrahams**	Jun 2016 – May 2018
Shadow Secretary of State for Work and Pensions	**Margaret Greenwood**	May 2018 (Note: Acting: March 2018 - May 2018.) – Apr 2020
Shadow Minister for Employment	Emily Thornberry	Sep 2015 – Jan 2016
Shadow Minister for Employment	Nick Thomas-Symonds	Jan 2016 – Jun 2016
Shadow Minister for Employment	Margaret Greenwood (and Inequalities)	Oct 2016 – May 2018
Shadow Minister for Employment	Mike Amesbury	Jul 2018 – Apr 2020
Shadow Minister for Disabled People	Debbie Abrahams	Sep 2015 – Jun 2016
Shadow Minister for Disabled People	Marie Rimmer	Feb 2017 – Oct 2017
Shadow Minister for Disabled People	Marsha de Cordova	Oct 2017 – Apr 2020
Shadow Minister for Pensions	Nick Thomas-Symonds	Sep 2015 – Jan 2016
Shadow Minister for Pensions	Angela Rayner	Jan 2016 – Jul 2016
Shadow Minister for Pensions	Alex Cunningham	Oct 2016 – Dec 2017
Shadow Minister for Pensions	Jack Dromey	Jan 2018 – Apr 2020
Parliamentary Private Secretary	Margaret Greenwood	Sep 2015 – Oct 2016
Parliamentary Private Secretary	Mike Amesbury	Jan 2018 – Jul 2018
Parliamentary Private Secretary	Claudia Webbe	Feb 2020 – Apr 2020
Shadow Spokesperson for Work and Pensions	The Lord McKenzie of Luton	Sep 2015 – Apr 2020
Shadow Spokesperson for Work and Pensions	The Baroness Sherlock	Sep 2015 – Apr 2020

== Transport ==
Transport
Shadow Secretary of State for Transport	**Lilian Greenwood**	Sep 2015 – Jun 2016
Shadow Secretary of State for Transport	**Andy McDonald**	Jun 2016 – Apr 2020
Shadow Minister for Local Transport	Cat Smith	Until Jan 2018
Shadow Minister for Local Transport	Matt Rodda	Jan 2018 – Apr 2020
Shadow Minister for Shipping, Aviation and Road Safety	Karl Turner	Jul 2017 – Apr 2020
Shadow Minister for Rail	Jonathan Reynolds	Sep 2015 – Jan 2016
Shadow Minister for Rail	Andy McDonald	Jan 2016 – Jun 2016
Shadow Minister for Rail	Pat Glass	Oct 2016 – May 2017
Shadow Minister for Rail	Rachael Maskell	Jul 2017 – Jan 2020
Shadow Minister for Transport	Richard Burden	Sep 2015 – Jun 2016
Shadow Minister for Transport	Richard Burden	Oct 2016 – Jun 2017
Shadow Minister for Transport	Daniel Zeichner	Sep 2015 – Jun 2017
Parliamentary Private Secretary	Mary Glindon	Sep 2015 – Jun 2016
Parliamentary Private Secretary	Matt Rodda	Jul 2017 – Jan 2018
Parliamentary Private Secretary	Ruth George	Feb 2018 – Dec 2019
Shadow Spokesperson for Transport	The Lord Rosser	Sep 2015 – Apr 2020
Shadow Spokesperson for Transport	The Lord Tunnicliffe	Feb 2018 – Apr 2020

== Women and equalities ==
Women and Equalities
Shadow Minister for Women and Equalities	**Kate Green**	Sep 2015 – Jun 2016
Shadow Minister for Women and Equalities	**Angela Rayner**	Jun 2016 – Oct 2016
Shadow Minister for Women and Equalities	**Sarah Champion**	Oct 2016 – Jun 2017
Shadow Secretary of State for Women and Equalities	**Sarah Champion**	Jun 2017 – Aug 2017
Shadow Secretary of State for Women and Equalities	**Dawn Butler**	Aug 2017 – Apr 2020
Shadow Minister for Diverse Communities	**Dawn Butler**	Oct 2016 – Feb 2017
Shadow Minister for Diverse Communities	**Dawn Butler**	Jun 2017 – Aug 2017
Shadow Minister for Women and Equalities (junior)	Cat Smith	Sep 2015 – Jun 2016
Shadow Minister for Women and Equalities (junior)	Kate Osamor	Jan 2016 – Jun 2016
Shadow Minister for Women and Equalities (junior)	Paula Sherriff	Oct 2016 – Jan 2018
Shadow Minister for Women and Equalities (junior)	Carolyn Harris	Jul 2017 – Apr 2020
Shadow Minister for Women and Equalities (junior)	Naz Shah	Jul 2018 – Apr 2020
Parliamentary Private Secretary	Rosie Duffield	Jan 2018 – Jun 2018
Shadow Spokesperson for Women and Equalities	The Baroness Hayter of Kentish Town	Sep 2015 – Jan 2017
Shadow Spokesperson for Women and Equalities	The Baroness Gale	Jan 2017 – Apr 2020

== Reshuffles and changes ==
=== 2016 ===
January

Paula Sherriff resigned as Jon Trickett's PPS.

Jim McMahon was appointed PPS to Tom Watson, Deputy Leader of the Labour Party.

February

Naz Shah was appointed PPS to John McDonnell, Shadow Chancellor.

April

Naz Shah resigned as a PPS after her past comments about Israel were uncovered.

October

Karin Smyth was appointed as PPS to Keir Starmer, Shadow Brexit Secretary.

=== 2017 ===
July

The following appointments were made:

- Dan Carden as PPS to Rebecca Long-Bailey, Shadow BEIS Secretary.
- Helen Goodman as a Shadow Foreign Affairs Minister, with responsibilities including the Americas, Australasia, Far East and Polar Regions.
- Emma Hardy as PPS to Keir Starmer, Shadow Brexit Secretary.
- Jo Platt as PPS to Angela Rayner, Shadow Education Secretary.
- Luke Pollard as PPS to Sue Hayman, Shadow DEFRA Secretary.
- Matt Rodda as PPS to Andy McDonald, Shadow Transport Secretary.
- Danielle Rowley as PPS to Emily Thornberry, Shadow Foreign Secretary.
- Lloyd Russell-Moyle as PPS to Richard Burgon, Shadow Justice Secretary.

=== 2018 ===
January

The following appointments were made:

- Mike Amesbury as PPS to Debbie Abrahams, Shadow Work and Pensions Secretary.
- Lyn Brown as a Shadow Treasury Minister, responsible for social inclusion and mobility.
- Bambos Charalambous as PPS to Rebecca Long-Bailey.
- Emma Dent Coad as PPS to Jon Trickett.
- Rosie Duffield as PPS to Dawn Butler.
- Clive Lewis as a Shadow Treasury Minister, responsible for economic sustainability.
- Sarah Jones as PPS to John Healey.

February

The following appointments were made:

- Ruth George as PPS to Andy McDonald, Shadow Transport Secretary.
- Ged Killen as PPS to Nia Griffith, Shadow Defence Secretary.
- Ellie Reeves as PPS to Kate Osamor, Shadow International Development Secretary.

May

James Frith was appointed PPS to John Healey, Shadow Housing Secretary.

June

Shadow Cabinet Office Minister Laura Smith and PPSs Tonia Antoniazzi, Rosie Duffield, Ged Killen, Anna McMorrin and Ellie Reeves resigned on 13 June after defying the whip on a Brexit vote.

July

Karin Smyth, Shadow Deputy Commons Leader, was appointed Shadow Northern Ireland Minister. Luke Pollard was promoted from PPS to the Shadow DEFRA Secretary to Shadow DEFRA Minister on an acting basis whilst Holly Lynch was on maternity leave.

October

Sandy Martin was appointed Shadow DEFRA Minister.

=== 2019 ===
January

Diane Abbott replaced Kate Osamor as a front bench representative on the Labour NEC.

March

Alex Norris was appointed Shadow International Development Minister on an acting basis.

Ruth Smeeth resigned as PPS to Tom Watson after serving in the role for two years.

April

Alex Cunningham was appointed Shadow Housing Minister.

July

Stephen Morgan was appointed Shadow Communities and Local Government Minister. Justin Madders was appointed acting Shadow BEIS Minister whilst Laura Pidcock as maternity cover for Laura Pidcock, and continued to serve in the Health and Social Care team.

Gloria de Piero resigned as a Shadow Justice Minister.

August

Alex Sobel was appointed as PPS to Emily Thornberry, Shadow Foreign Secretary.

=== 2020 ===
January

Ruth Jones, Alan Whitehead and Daniel Zeichner were appointed as Shadow DEFRA Ministers, Tulip Siddiq as Shadow Education Minister, Catherine West as Shadow DCMS Minister, and Abena Oppong-Asare and Navendu Mishra appointed as PPSs.

Later in the month, the following appointments were made:

- Bambos Charalambous as a Shadow Justice Minister, leading on legal aid and victims.
- Helen Hayes as an Opposition Whip.
- Conor McGinn as an Opposition Whip.
- Kate Osborne as PPS to Diane Abbott, Shadow Home Secretary.
- Stephanie Peacock as a Shadow Cabinet Office Minister, responsible for the Office of Veterans and government procurement.
- Bell Ribeiro-Addy as Shadow Immigration Minister.
- Zarah Sultana as PPS to Dan Carden, Shadow International Development Secretary.

February

Claudia Webbe was appointed PPS to Margaret Greenwood, Shadow Work and Pensions Secretary, on 26 February.

March

Rachel Hopkins was appointed PPS to Richard Burgon, Shadow Justice Secretary.
