= Richard Rosser, Baron Rosser =

British politician and peer (1944–2024)

The Right Honourable The Lord Rosser
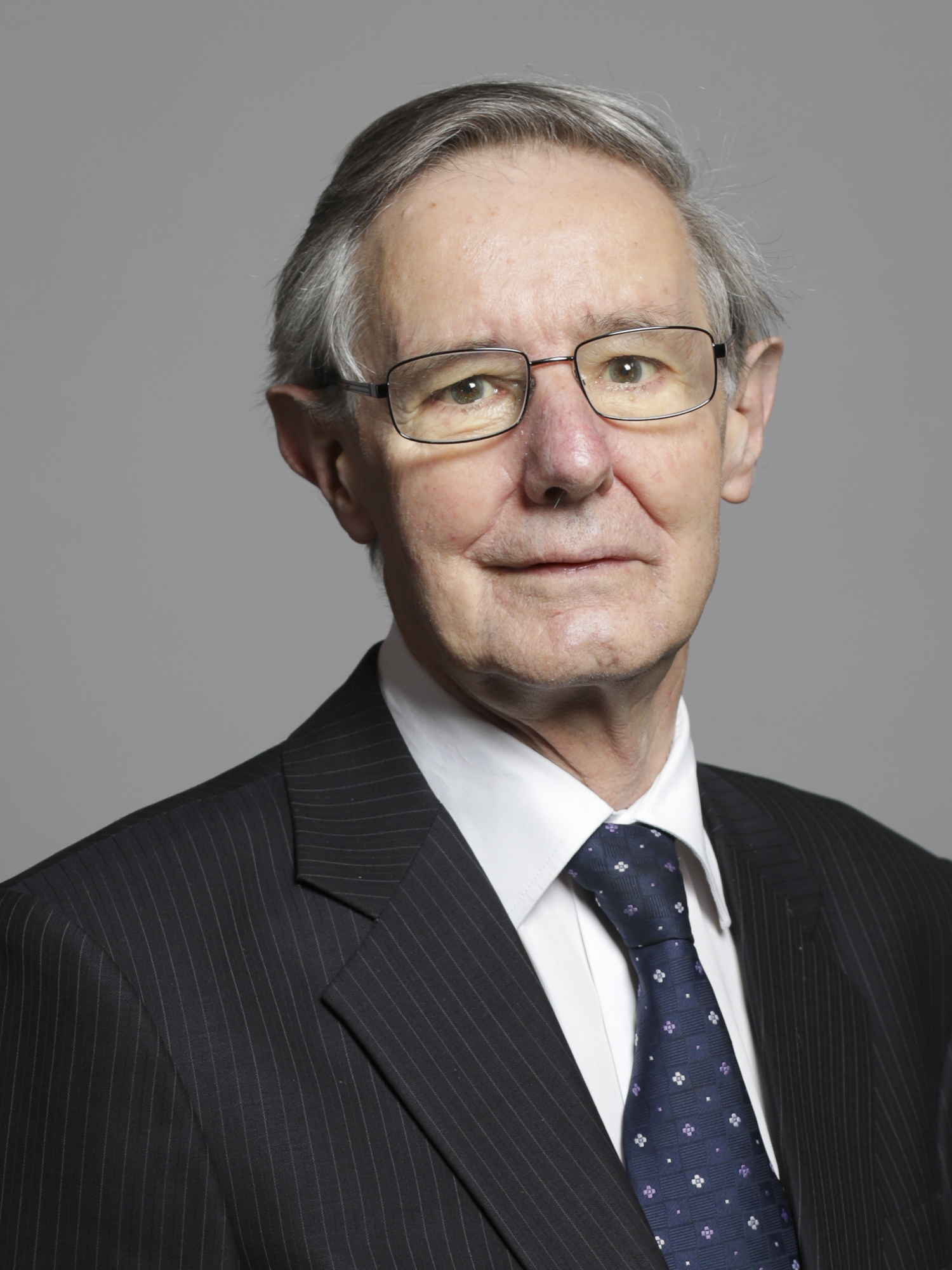
- Official portrait, 2020

Member of the House of Lords
- Lord Temporal
- Life peerage 14 June 2004 – 10 April 2024

Chairman of the National Executive Committee of the Labour Party
- In office 1997–1998

Personal details
- Born: 5 October 1944 Northwood, Middlesex, England
- Died: 10 April 2024 (aged 79)
- Party: Labour

Richard Andrew Rosser, Baron Rosser (5 October 1944 – 10 April 2024) was a British trade union leader and Labour politician who was a member of the House of Lords. He latterly served as Shadow Spokesperson for Transport and Home Affairs in the House of Lords.

== Trade union career ==
Initially employed by London Transport he joined the staff of the Transport Salaried Staffs' Association (TSSA) early in his working career, representing London Transport's white-collar staff in negotiations with the management. He rose through the ranks of the TSSA to be an Assistant General Secretary (one of two, at the time), and in 1989 he was elected General Secretary of the union (i.e. in day-to-day control, but answerable to an elected Executive Committee of lay members, and to the Annual Conference). Rosser was re-elected twice, serving a total of fifteen years in office before his retirement in 2004 – a record second only to the thirty years (1906-1936) served by Alexander Walkden.

During his time at the TSSA, Rosser was also a magistrate and was Chairman of the National Executive Committee of the Labour Party in 1997–98.

== Political activity ==
Rosser was the Labour candidate for Croydon Central at the general election of February 1974, but was not elected.

== House of Lords ==
Following his retirement from TSSA Rosser was created a life peer on 14 June 2004 as Baron Rosser, of Ickenham in the London Borough of Hillingdon, taking his seat in the House of Lords on the Labour Party benches in the summer of 2004. In addition to transport matters, he took an interest in penal policy, being chair of the Prison Service Audit Committee and a non-executive member of the Prison Service change programme board.

Rosser served as an Opposition Whip and Spokesperson for the Labour Party on defence, home affairs and transport at various times from 2010. He stood down from the Labour front bench in 2022 due to ill health. Lord Rosser died on 10 April 2024, at the age of 79.

Coat of arms of Richard Rosser, Baron Rosser

Crest
A stag lodged reguardant Argent attired and unguled Or supporting with the dexter forefoot a wheel Azure.
Escutcheon
Or on each of three pallets Azure issuing in base couped and embowed in chief a sword blade issuing in base Argent a chief dancetty throughout of three points upwards Azure.
Supporters
Dexter a unicorn dimidiated with a lion Argent winged horned armed and unguled Or sinister a unicorn dimidiated with a lion Or winged horned and unguled Argent.
Motto
Per Unitatem Proficimus (Through Unity We Progress)

Trade union offices
Preceded by Bert Lyons	General Secretary of the Transport Salaried Staffs' Association; 1989–2004	Succeeded by Gerry Doherty
Party political offices
Preceded by Robin Cook	Chair of the Labour Party; 1997–1998	Succeeded by Brenda Etchells
