= Shadow Minister for Peace and Disarmament =

Member of the opposition frontbench

- Appointer: Leader of the Opposition
- Inaugural holder: Fabian Hamilton
- Formation: 8 November 2016
- Abolished: 5 September 2023

In British politics, the Shadow Minister for Peace and Disarmament was a position within the opposition that deals with issues surrounding North Africa, the Middle East, North Korea and policy on nuclear weapons. The position was created by Jeremy Corbyn and had no equivalent in His Majesty's Government.

== List of Shadow Ministers for Peace and Disarmament ==
Name	Portrait	Term of office		Political party	Leader
Fabian Hamilton		8 November 2016	5 September 2023	Labour	Jeremy Corbyn Keir Starmer
