= Wilf Stevenson, Baron Stevenson of Balmacara =

British Baron (born 1947)

The Right Honourable The Lord Stevenson of Balmacara
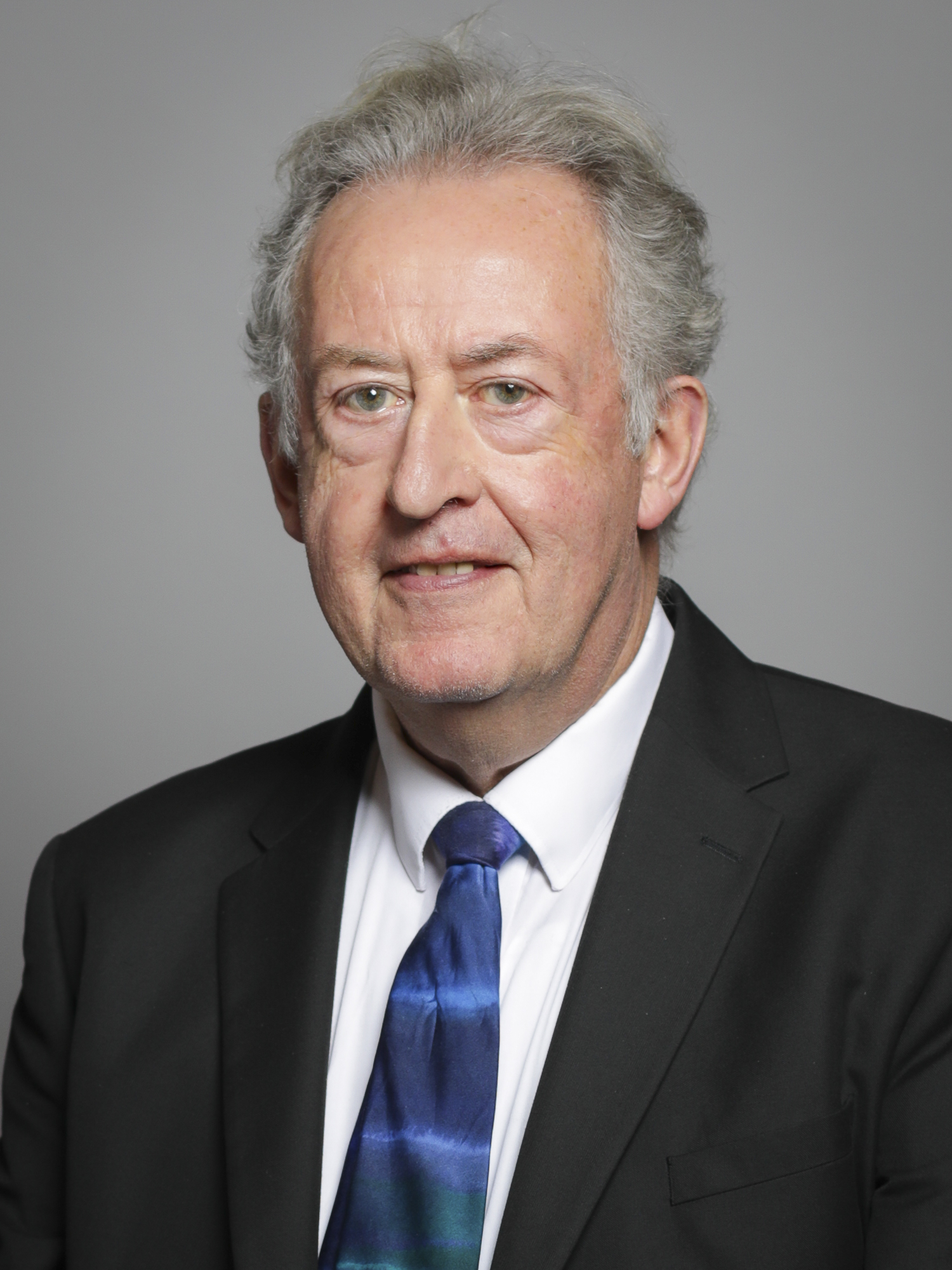

Member of the House of Lords
- Lord Temporal
- Life peerage 13 July 2010

Personal details
- Born: 19 April 1947 (age 79)
- Party: Labour
- Education: Edinburgh Academy; University College, Oxford

Robert Wilfrid "Wilf" Stevenson, Baron Stevenson of Balmacara (born 19 April 1947) is a Labour Party life peer and former adviser to Gordon Brown.

== Early life ==
Stevenson is the son of James Alexander Stevenson and Elizabeth Anne Stevenson (née Macrae). He was born with hypospadias, which he talked about in a parliamentary debate in 2018.

== Education ==
Stevenson was educated at Edinburgh Academy, at the time an independent boarding school for boys (now a co-educational day school). He then went on to study at University College, Oxford, obtaining an MA in Chemistry, and later at Napier Polytechnic (now Edinburgh Napier University), where he received an accountancy diploma (ACCA).

== Career ==
Stevenson began his career as a Research Officer at the Edinburgh University Students' Association (1970–74). He then spent thirteen years as a secretary at Napier College of Commerce and Technology in Edinburgh, before becoming Deputy Director (1987–88) and then Director (1988–97) of the British Film Institute. From 1997 to 2008 he was the Director of the Smith Institute, a social-democratic think-tank named in honour of former Labour Party leader John Smith. After leaving government in 2010 he became the Chairman of the Foundation for Credit Counselling, remaining in that role until his retirement in 2015.

Stevenson was a Governor of Prestwood Lodge School from 2008 to 2010. In 2008 he was awarded a Hon. DArts from Napier University.

== Political career ==
Stevenson is a long-term friend and confidant of the former Prime Minister Gordon Brown; the two first met when Brown was an undergraduate student in the early 1970s. From 2008 to 2010, he was a Senior Policy Adviser at the Prime Minister's Office.

Stevenson was created a Life Peer on 13 July 2010, taking the title Baron Stevenson of Balmacara, of Little Missenden in the County of Buckinghamshire. He has served as an Opposition Whip since 2011.

== Family ==
In 1972, he married Jennifer Grace Antonio, whom he later divorced in 1979. In 1991, he married Ann Minogue; they have one son, Tobin, and two daughters, Iona and Flora.

== Bibliography ==
- Gordon Brown, Kofi Annan and Wilf Stevenson (eds.), Gordon Brown, speeches 1997–2006 (London: Bloomsbury, 2006). ISBN 9780747588375
- Gordon Brown and Wilf Stevenson (eds.), Moving Britain Forward: Selected Speeches, 1997–2006 (London: Bloomsbury, 2006). ISBN 9780747588382
- Gordon Brown and Wilf Stevenson (eds.), The Change We Choose: speeches 2007–2009 (Edinburgh: Mainstream Publications, 2010) ISBN 9781845966324

Orders of precedence in the United Kingdom
Preceded by The Lord Macdonald of River Glaven	Gentlemen; Baron Stevenson of Balmacara	Followed by The Lord Howard of Lympne
