= Christopher Lennie, Baron Lennie =

British politician

The Right Honourable The Lord Lennie
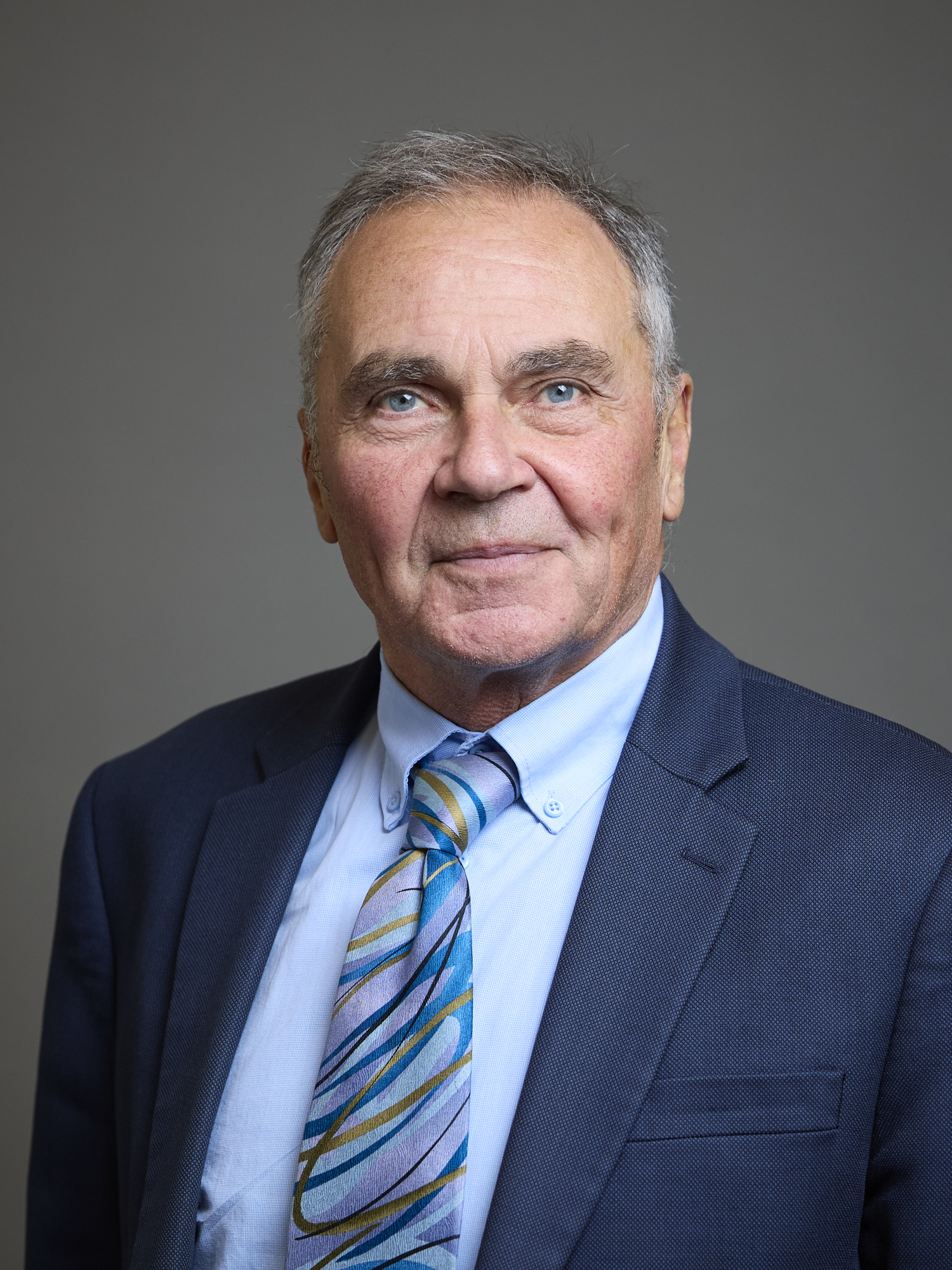
- Official portrait, 2024

Deputy General Secretary of the Labour Party
- In office 2001–2012 Serving with Alicia Kennedy (2006–11)
- Leader: Tony Blair; Gordon Brown; Ed Miliband
- General Secretary: David Triesman; Matt Carter; Peter Watt; Ray Collins; Iain McNicol

Member of the House of Lords
- Lord Temporal
- Life peerage 22 September 2014

Personal details
- Born: 22 February 1953 (age 73)
- Party: Labour
- Other offices: 2016–present: Opposition Whip in the Lords; 2021–present: Shadow BEIS Spokesperson; 2021–present: Shadow International Trade Spokesperson

Christopher John Lennie, Baron Lennie (born 22 February 1953) is a British politician and life peer who served as Deputy General Secretary of the Labour Party from 2001 to 2012. He has been an Opposition Whip in the House of Lords since 2016 and a Shadow Spokesperson since 2021.

== Political career ==
Lennie was regional director of the Labour Party in Northern England, and appointed Assistant General Secretary of the national party after the 2001 general election. He also served as Acting General Secretary on a couple of occasions.

He was shortlisted alongside Iain McNicol, then GMB Political Officer, to become General Secretary of the Labour Party in 2011. Despite reportedly being party leader's Ed Miliband's favoured candidate, Labour's NEC selected McNicol in a move seen as a departure from the New Labour era.

Lennie was appointed as a life peer in the House of Lords on 22 September 2014, as Baron Lennie of Longsands Tynemouth in the County of Tyne and Wear. He joined the opposition front bench as a whip in October 2016, and became a Shadow Spokesperson for Business, Energy and Industrial Strategy and International Trade in May 2021.

Party political offices
Vacant	Deputy General Secretary of the Labour Party; 2001 – 2011	Vacant
Orders of precedence in the United Kingdom
Preceded by The Lord Scriven	Gentlemen; Baron Lennie	Followed by The Lord Cashman
