= Opposition Deputy Chief Whip in House of Lords =

Opposition Deputy Chief Whip is a position in the Opposition Frontbench in the House of Lords. The office holder tends to be shared by two members, each responsible for supervising whips in the chamber and reporting to the Leader and Chief Whip. As is the custom in the Lords, the officeholder acts as a spokesperson, as well as their duties as a Whip. It is currently held by Conservative Peers Baroness Stedman-Scott, Lord Jamieson and Baroness Bloomfield of Hinton Waldrist.
