= Pontypool Free Press =

The Pontypool Free Press
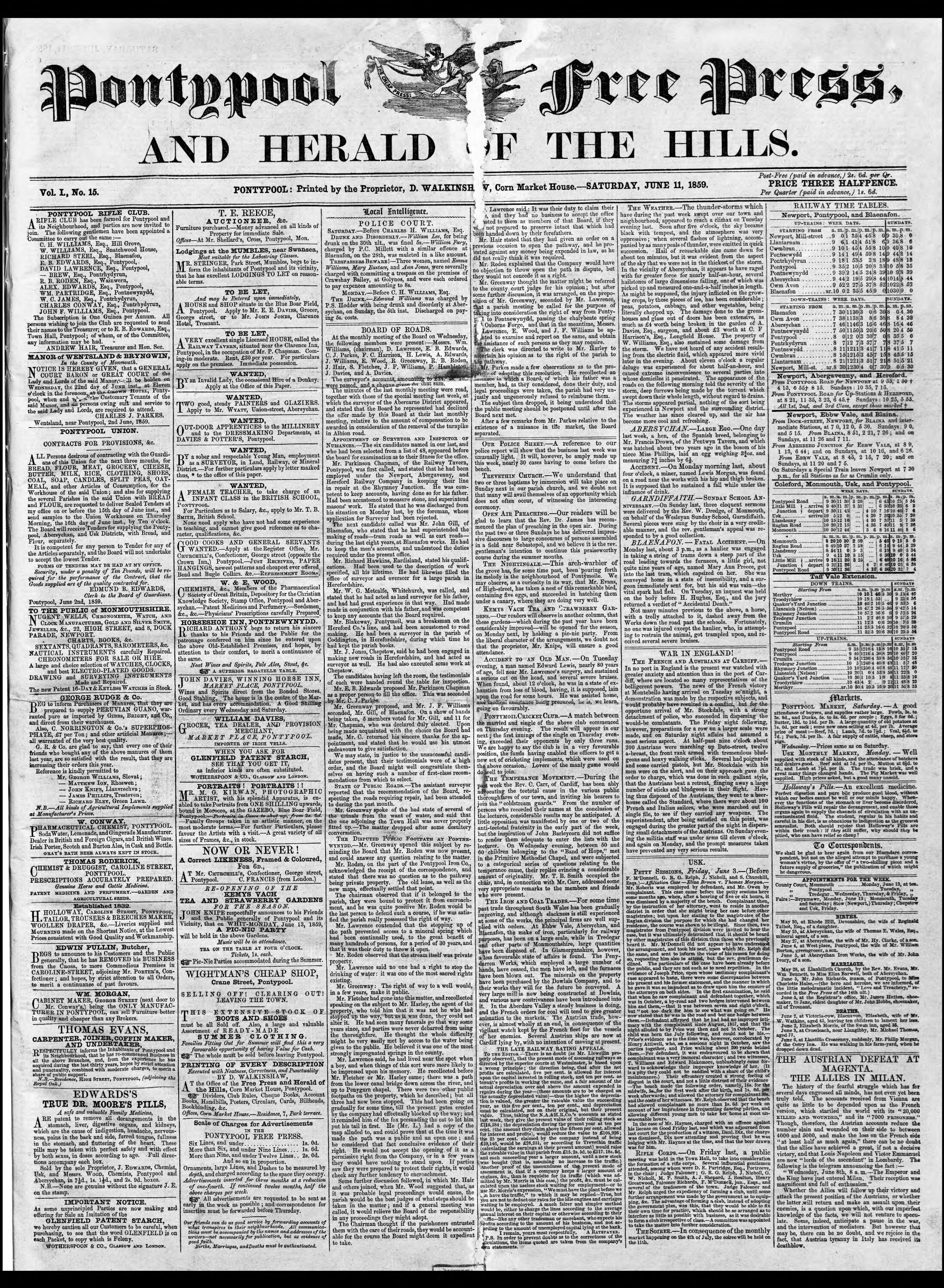
- Pontypool Free Press front page 11 June 1859
- Type: Weekly newspaper
- Format: Tabloid
- Owner(s): Newsquest
- Founder(s): David Walkinshaw
- Publisher: Newsquest Media (Southern) Ltd
- Deputy editor: Nicole Garnon
- Managing editor: Kevin Ward
- Founded: 1859
- Headquarters: Cardiff Road, Maesglas, Newport NP20 3QN
- Circulation: 1,614 (as of 2023)
- Sister newspapers: South Wales Argus, Penarth Times, Barry & District News
- ISSN: 1757-3076
- OCLC number: 500055627
- Website: freepressseries.co.uk

The Pontypool Free Press is an English language weekly regional newspaper that was originally published in Pontypool, as the Pontypool Free Press and Herald of the Hills, in 1859 and is circulated in Pontypool and the surrounding area of Torfaen, in south-east Wales.

== History ==
The Pontypool Free Press and Herald of the Hills was established in 1859, with the first edition on 5 March 1859. It was printed and published in Pontypool, in English, by the proprietor David Walkinshaw. (Note: Walkinshaw is commemorated as the founder of the paper in a stained glass window in the Church of St Michael and All Angels, New Inn.) In 1877 Henry Hughes Junior agreed to purchase the paper, along with the Pontypool Local Register and the Pontypool Almanack, for £1,000 from Walkinshaw. (Note: In 1870, Hughes had built a printing works, the Griffin Press, which remained in operation until 1988 when it was converted into flats.. The former offices of the paper are now known as Henry Hughes House.)

The name of the newspaper changed on 5 July 1879, to The Pontypool Free Press, and on 2 April 1909 to The Free Press of Monmouthshire.

In the 1980s, Don Touhig, later to become the Member of Parliament for Islwyn and a life peer, was editor of the newspaper. Touhig worked on the paper from 1968 to 1994, starting as a journalist, and ending as general manager of the Free Press Group.

An edition covering Chepstow was added in 1980, with other editions added later, giving four titles produced by the Free Press Group:

- Abergavenny Free Press
- Chepstow Free Press
- Monmouth Free Press
- Pontypool Free Press

In 1997 the Bailey Newspaper Group, the then owners of the Free Press Group, was bought by Southern Newspapers, based in Southampton. In 1998 Southern Newspapers changed its name to Newscom and, in 2000, was bought by the Newsquest Media Group.

== Current owners ==
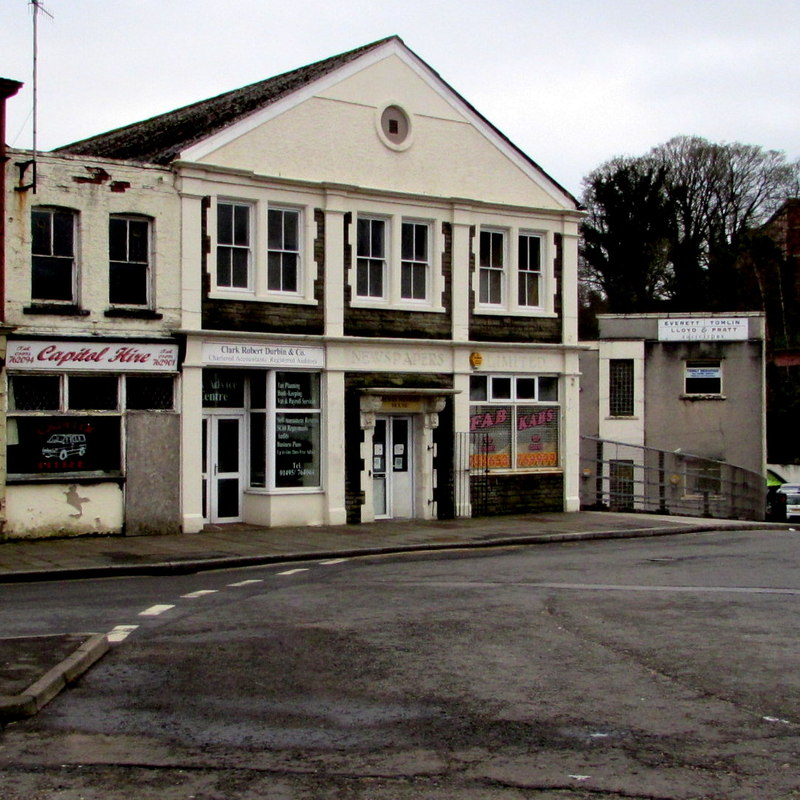
Former offices of the Pontypool Free Press

In November 2008 Newsquest Media (Southern) Ltd merged the Abergavenny, Chepstow, and Monmouth editions into one edition covering Monmouthshire called The Free Press. The Pontypool Free Press continued as a separate edition.

In November 2011 Newsquest moved the editorial staff to its regional headquarters, at the offices of the South Wales Argus, in Newport, closing its offices in Pontypool and Chepstow. Soon after, Torfaen County Borough Council offered the paper an office at the Pontypool Civic Centre, and journalists now use the office as a drop-in centre every Friday.

The paper maintains a close relationship with the local rugby club, Pontypool RFC, as "Official Media Partner".

The paper is part of a group of papers covering some of south-east Wales, including the South Wales Argus, Penarth Times, and the Penarth & District News. The papers are all based at Cardiff Road, Maesglas, Newport NP20 3QN, with Kevin Ward as Regional Managing Editor and Nicole Garnon as Deputy Editor. The paper is currently released as a tabloid and in 2013 had an average circulation of 5,022 (including The Free Press) with a cover price of £0.40.

== Archives ==
Paper, and microfiche, archives of the Pontypool Free Press and The Free Press of Monmouthshire are held at Gwent Archives, Ebbw Vale and Newport Central Library.

An online digital archive of the paper (1859–1869 and 1872–1893) is available from Welsh Newspapers Online.
