= Labour Listens =

Consultative exercise by the British Labour Party

Labour Listens was a consultative exercise by the British Labour Party. It was appointed after Labour's third successive defeat in 1987 (having previously lost in 1979 and 1983) to discover why Labour was unpopular and to help the party formulate policies more in tune with public opinion. Neil Kinnock, the leader of the Labour Party at the time, called it "the biggest consultation exercise with the British public any political party has ever undertaken".

In September 1987, the chairman of Labour's home policy committee, Tom Sawyer, wrote in The Times:

There is a wide recognition that June 11 cannot be shrugged off as a temporary setback. We won barely one in three votes and in large areas of southern England we trailed in as outsiders. For too many people Labour simply lacked “X” appeal. Was it policy or image, credibility or leadership? It was all of these, in different measures for different people...We need to tackle our policy review in a serious and systematic way. First we need a period to think carefully what went wrong. We have to show the electorate we are prepared to listen and learn...Above all we need to listen to the people whose votes we need to win, without neglecting our supporters. Our policies must be in touch with their concerns, and in tune with their aspirations.

Labour Listens was launched on 25 January 1988 by senior shadow Cabinet members Roy Hattersley and Frank Dobson in Brighton, an area where Labour did badly in the election. This was the first of eleven regional meetings.

Tony Benn attacked Labour Listens because he believed it would lead to the abandonment of traditional Labour values by the Labour leadership. He argued that Britain needed policies based on conviction espoused by a radical and tolerant socialist party. Benn also said, "You can win an election with a pink flag and you can win an election with a pink rose, but you cannot win an election with an ear trumpet." Arthur Scargill was also a critic of the publicity campaign surrounding Labour Listens: "We do not need Saatchi & Saatchi and red roses. Marx and Engels and the red blood flag of socialism should be put on the agenda of British politics."

In May 1988, a report by Labour's campaign strategy committee that reviewed Labour's performance since the previous autumn said that Labour Listens had only limited success. Eric Shaw argued that when Labour Listens was launched it was accorded importance almost equivalent to the wide-ranging Policy Review but "the party never really decided whether it was primarily a public relations ploy or a serious consultative exercise. As a result it fell between two stools and was an embarrassing flop. Specially organised public meetings were poorly attended and produced little of value. By the end of the first phase of the review ‘Labour Listens’ was allowed, quietly and unobtrusively, to wither away".

In the aftermath of the Conservatives' massive defeat to Labour in 1997, the Conservatives launched a similar exercise called "Listening to Britain".
