= Chris Evans (British politician) =

Welsh politician (born 1977)

Chris Evans MP
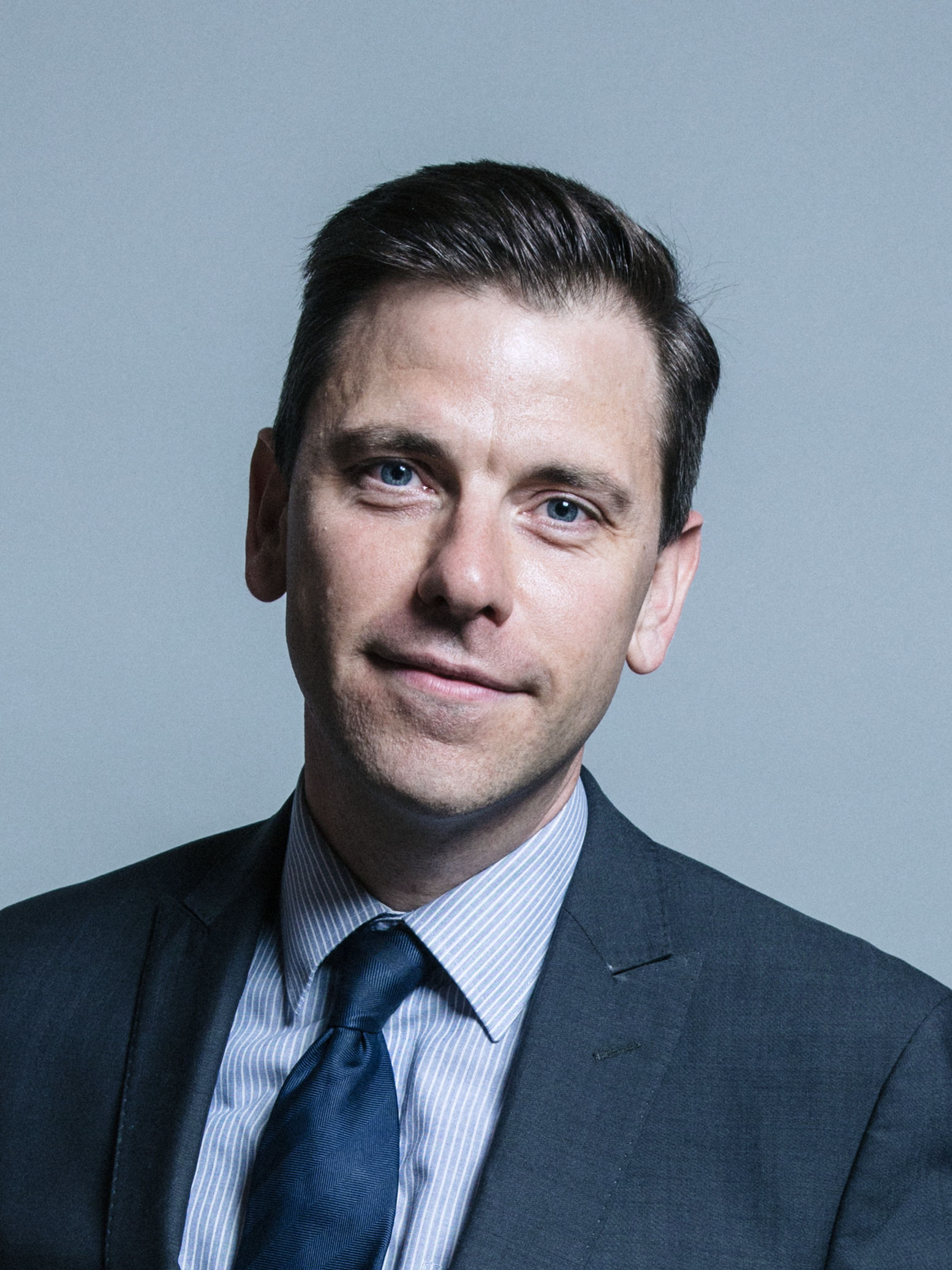
- Official portrait, 2017

Member of Parliament
- Incumbent
- Assumed office 6 May 2010
- Preceded by: Don Touhig
- Constituency: Islwyn (2010–2024); Caerphilly (2024–present)
- Majority: 6,419 (16.8%)
Shadow portfolios
2023–2024	Tech and Digital Economy
2023–2023	Social Security
2021–2023	Defence Procurement

Personal details
- Born: Christopher James Evans; 17 July 1977 (age 49) Llwynypia, Mid Glamorgan, Wales
- Party: Labour Co-op
- Spouse: Julia Ockenden (m. 2013)
- Education: Trinity College, Carmarthen
- Website: chrisevansmp.com

Christopher James Evans (born 17 July 1977) is a British politician serving as Member of Parliament (MP) for Caerphilly since 2024, and previously for Islwyn from 2010 to 2024. He is a member of the Labour and Co-operative parties.

== Early life ==
Chris Evans was born on 17 July 1977 in Llwynypia, Mid Glamorgan and raised in Rhondda. He graduated with a history degree from Trinity College, Carmarthen.

At the age of 13 he suffered a serious leg injury in a road traffic collision and underwent months of recovery: he later stated that the experience, on top of the stress caused by his parents' divorce, had caused him to develop body dysmorphic disorder.

Before being elected to Parliament he worked as a bookmaker, in a bank and as a trade union official. He worked as a parliamentary researcher to then-Islwyn MP Don Touhig for four years.

== Parliamentary career ==
He was the Labour candidate for Cheltenham at the 2005 general election, but lost. However, at the 2010 general election he was elected MP for the safe Labour seat of Islwyn.

His maiden speech focused on affordable lending and pay day loans. Since being elected he has campaigned against fuel poverty and in January 2011 led a Westminster Hall debate and spoke out against energy price rises. He is also a campaigner for the introduction of a Presumption of Death Act.

He led a Westminster Hall debate on employment opportunities for people with inflammatory bowel disease.

Evans was a member of the Justice Select Committee. In July 2012, after two years as an MP, he was promoted to the Shadow Department of Environment, Food and Rural Affairs as Parliamentary Private Secretary to shadow Secretary of State Mary Creagh Following a reshuffle in October 2013, Evans joined Labour's Shadow Treasury Team as Parliamentary Private Secretary to Chief Secretary to the Treasury, Chris Leslie.

He supported Owen Smith in the failed attempt to replace Jeremy Corbyn in the 2016 Labour Party (UK) leadership election.

In March 2012, Evans introduced a ten-minute rule bill called 'The Banking Responsibility and Disclosure Bill' which aimed to tackle the growing problem of financial exclusion to ensure that banks are responsible for their actions. He has written several articles on this topic.

On 19 January 2012, Evans said that he had been attacked by a dog which left a one-inch scar on his middle finger as he called on the government to take action against irresponsible dog owners. Since then, he has been campaigning to promote responsible dog ownership. In May 2012 he held a Westminster Hall debate on dangerous dog legislation and called on the government to introduce the compulsory microchipping of all dogs, recorded by a single national database.

In 2013, Evans launched a work experience program in Islwyn to help combat the problem of youth unemployment. Working alongside 200 local businesses, the scheme offers 6–8 week work placements for 18 to 24-year-olds out of work. The Islwyn Work Experience Programme is voluntary with applicants receiving additional help from Job Centre Plus to continue looking for permanent work. It was launched alongside local businesses at a media event at the Crosskeys campus of Coleg Gwent.

In September 2020, Evans was appointed a vice-chair of Labour Friends of Israel.

With his constituency being abolished by the 2023 Periodic Review of Westminster constituencies, Evans successfully contested Caerphilly at the 2024 general election.

=== Labour Frontbench ===
Evans was promoted to the position of Shadow Minister for Defence Procurement in the minor May 2021 reshuffle, filling the vacant position following Khalid Mahmood's resignation a month earlier. This role shadows the Minister for Defence Procurement at the Ministry of Defence who has responsibility for the Defence Equipment Plan, relations with the defence industry and exports, science and technology. Evans has been a member of Labour's Shadow Defence Team since 2020 when he became Parliamentary Private Secretary to the Shadow Secretary of State for Defence.

In the 2023 British shadow cabinet reshuffle, he became Shadow Minister for Social Security.

== Personal life ==
Evans married Julia Ockenden, a former head of public affairs at the BBC, in December 2013.

He is a published author whose work includes biographies of football manager Don Revie and boxer Freddie Mills.

Parliament of the United Kingdom
Preceded by Don Touhig	Member of Parliament for Islwyn; 2010–2024	Constituency abolished
Preceded by Wayne David	Member of Parliament for Caerphilly; 2024–present	Incumbent
