= Neil Kinnock =

Welsh politician (born 1942)

The Right Honourable The Lord Kinnock PC
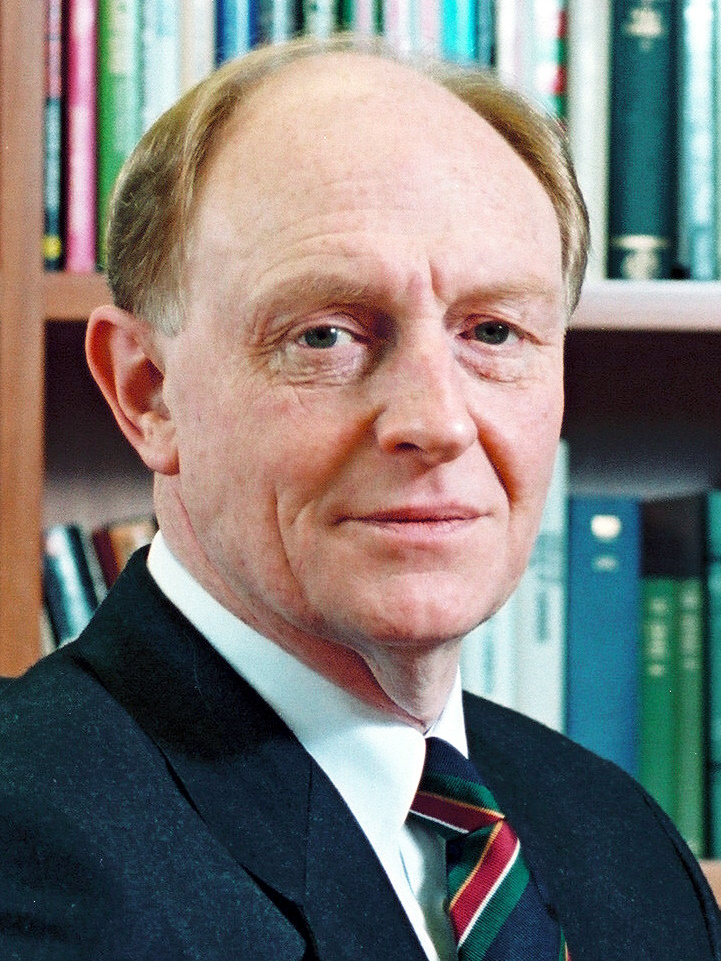
- Official portrait, 1995

Vice-President of the European Commission
- In office 16 September 1999 – 21 November 2004 Serving with Loyola de Palacio
- President: Romano Prodi

European Commissioner for Administrative Reform
- In office 16 September 1999 – 21 November 2004
- President: Romano Prodi
- Preceded by: Erkki Liikanen
- Succeeded by: Siim Kallas

European Commissioner for Transport
- In office 16 February 1995 – 16 September 1999
- President: Jacques Santer; Manuel Marín (acting)
- Preceded by: Karel Van Miert
- Succeeded by: Loyola de Palacio

Leader of the Opposition
- In office 2 October 1983 – 18 July 1992
- Monarch: Elizabeth II
- Prime Minister: Margaret Thatcher; John Major
- Preceded by: Michael Foot
- Succeeded by: John Smith

Leader of the Labour Party
- In office 2 October 1983 – 18 July 1992
- Deputy: Roy Hattersley
- Preceded by: Michael Foot
- Succeeded by: John Smith

Shadow Secretary of State for Education and Science
- In office 14 July 1979 – 2 October 1983
- Leader: James Callaghan; Michael Foot
- Preceded by: Gordon Oakes
- Succeeded by: Giles Radice

Member of the House of Lords
- Lord Temporal
- Life peerage 28 January 2005

Member of Parliament for Islwyn Bedwellty (1970–1983)
- In office 18 June 1970 – 20 January 1995
- Preceded by: Harold Finch
- Succeeded by: Don Touhig

Personal details
- Born: Neil Gordon Kinnock; 28 March 1942 (age 84) Tredegar, Wales
- Party: Labour
- Spouse: Glenys Parry (m. 1967; died 2023)
- Children: 2, including Stephen
- Education: Lewis School; Cardiff University (BA)
- Neil Kinnock's voice Kinnock presents proposals to the European Commission on modernising its human resources policy Recorded 30 October 2001

Neil Gordon Kinnock, Baron Kinnock (born 28 March 1942) is a Welsh politician who was Leader of the Opposition and Leader of the Labour Party from 1983 to 1992. He was a Member of Parliament (MP) from 1970 to 1995, first for Bedwellty and then for Islwyn. He was Vice-President of the European Commission from 1999 to 2004. Kinnock was positioned on the soft left of the Labour Party.

Born and raised in South Wales, Kinnock was first elected to the House of Commons in the 1970 general election. He became the Labour Party's shadow education minister after the Conservatives won power in the 1979 general election. After the party under Michael Foot suffered a landslide defeat to Margaret Thatcher in the 1983 election, Kinnock was elected Leader of the Labour Party and Leader of the Opposition. During his tenure as leader, Kinnock proceeded to fight the party's left wing, especially the Militant tendency, and he opposed NUM leader Arthur Scargill's methods in the 1984–1985 miners' strike. He led the party during most of the Thatcher government, which included its third successive election defeat when Thatcher won the 1987 general election. Although Thatcher had won another landslide, Labour regained sufficient seats for Kinnock to remain Leader of the Opposition following the election.

Kinnock led the Labour Party to a surprise fourth consecutive defeat at the 1992 general election, despite the party being ahead of John Major's Conservative government in most opinion polls, which had predicted either a narrow Labour victory or a hung parliament. Shortly afterwards, he resigned as Leader of the Labour Party; he was succeeded in the ensuing leadership election by John Smith. He left the House of Commons in 1995 to become a European commissioner. He went on to become Vice-President of the European Commission under Romano Prodi from 1999 to 2004, before being elevated to the House of Lords as Baron Kinnock in 2005. Until the summer of 2009, he was also the chairman of the British Council and the president of Cardiff University.

== Early life ==
Kinnock, an only child, was born in Tredegar, Wales on 28 March 1942. His father, Gordon Herbert Kinnock, was a former coal miner who later worked as a labourer, whilst his mother, Mary Kinnock (née Howells), was a district nurse. The Kinnock family lived in a terraced house in the mining town, where Neil grew up surrounded by the close-knit community typical of the South Wales Valleys. Gordon died of a heart attack in November 1971 at the age of 64, and Mary died the following month at 61.

In 1953, aged eleven, Kinnock began his secondary education at Lewis School, Pengam, once described by David Lloyd George as ‘the Eton of the Valleys’, but an institution Kinnock later criticised for its record on corporal punishment. The school was a direct grant grammar school that served pupils from across the Rhymney Valley and Monmouthshire, and Kinnock performed well academically, particularly in history and English. He went on to the University College of South Wales and Monmouthshire in Cardiff (now Cardiff University), where he graduated in 1965 with a degree in Industrial Relations and History. The following year, Kinnock obtained a postgraduate diploma in education. From August 1966 to May 1970, he worked as a tutor for a Workers' Educational Association (WEA).

At university, Kinnock was active in student politics and became involved with the Labour Party. During his time at Cardiff, he met Glenys Parry, a fellow student studying education. Kinnock later recalled that his work with the WEA exposed him to the concerns of working-class communities across South Wales and helped develop his skills as a public speaker.

== Member of Parliament ==
=== Early parliamentary career (1970–1979) ===
In June 1969, Kinnock secured the Labour Party nomination for the Bedwellty constituency in South Wales, narrowly defeating an endorsed candidate of the National Union of Mineworkers (Great Britain) who was twice his age. The constituency was later redesignated as Islwyn before the 1983 general election. He was first elected to the House of Commons on 18 June 1970 with a majority of 22,000 votes, and held the seat by massive majorities throughout his parliamentary career.

On entering Parliament, Kinnock immediately aligned himself with the left wing of the parliamentary Labour Party, joining the Tribune Group. His maiden speech was an abrasive attack on the Conservative government during a debate on the National Health Service. In his first address to the Commons, he announced to the assembled MPs: "I am the first male member of my family for about three generations who can have reasonable confidence in expecting that I will leave this earth with more or less the same number of fingers, hands, legs, toes and eyes as I had when I was born."

During the 1970–1974 parliament, he spoke frequently in debates and conscientiously attended to the needs of his Bedwellty constituents. However, his parliamentary performance would later become controversial. Thereafter, his attendance in Parliament dropped off significantly; and by the early 1980s he had one of the ten worst attendance records of all contemporary MPs. This poor attendance record reflected his increasing focus on national political activities and media appearances rather than routine parliamentary business.

Kinnock's political views during the 1970s were characterised by firmly left-wing positions typical of the Tribune Group within the Labour Party. By 1974, he was described as a vocal advocate of the standard left-wing position on nuclear weapons, the Common Market, public ownership, incomes policy, and arms embargoes to South Africa, Chile, and El Salvador. During the 1970s, Kinnock was a fierce critic of the Labour governments of Harold Wilson and James Callaghan. He rejected offers of ministerial positions on ideological grounds, with one Conservative newspaper labelling him a "left wing fanatic" in 1978. In December 1974, he wrote an article on nationalisation in Labour Monthly, delivering a bitter criticism of the capitalist system.

From 1974 to 1975, Kinnock served as parliamentary private secretary to Michael Foot, who was then Secretary of State for Employment. This position gave him valuable experience of government operations and brought him into close contact with one of Labour's most prominent left-wing figures. Although he served briefly as Foot's parliamentary private secretary, he turned down offers of ministerial positions in the Wilson and Callaghan governments, preferring to maintain his independence on the backbenches.

During this period, Kinnock wrote two books that reflected his political thinking: Wales and the Common Market (1971) and As Nye Said (1980). The latter was a collection of speeches and writings by Aneurin Bevan, the Welsh Labour politician and health secretary during the government of prime minister Clement Attlee who had been Tredegar's MP before Kinnock.

In the 1975 referendum on Britain's membership of the European Communities, Kinnock campaigned for Britain to leave the Common Market. He led the Welsh opposition to legislation providing for limited self-government for Wales, arguing that the misfortunes of Welsh working people could best be redressed "in a single [British] nation and in a single economic unit". His stance was vindicated when Welsh voters overwhelmingly rejected the devolution proposals in the 1979 Welsh devolution referendum.

In the years from 1974 to 1979, Kinnock had gained a national following among the left wing of the Labour Party and in the country at large. He appeared frequently on television and spoke at many local Labour Party and trade union meetings. His reputation as a gifted orator grew during this period, and he became one of the most recognisable faces of Labour's left wing.

=== The SDP breakaway and Labour's internal crisis (1980–1983) ===
The late 1970s and early 1980s marked a period of profound crisis for the Labour Party that would fundamentally shape Kinnock's political trajectory. Following Labour's defeat at the 1979 general election, the party moved decisively to the left under new leader Michael Foot, adopting policies including unilateral nuclear disarmament and withdrawal from the European Economic Community. These leftward shifts, combined with organisational changes that increased the power of trade unions and constituency activists in selecting the party leader through a new electoral college system, alarmed many on the party's right wing.

The breaking point came in January 1981 with the Limehouse Declaration, when four former Labour Cabinet ministers—Roy Jenkins, David Owen, Bill Rodgers, and Shirley Williams—announced their intention to form the Social Democratic Party (SDP). In total, 28 Labour MPs would eventually defect to the new party, representing the most significant parliamentary split in British politics since the war. The SDP quickly formed an electoral alliance with the Liberal Party, creating a formidable centrist challenge that threatened to displace Labour as the main opposition to the Conservatives.

Kinnock found himself in a complex position during this crisis. As a member of the Tribune Group left, he was sympathetic to many of the policies that had driven the SDP defectors away, yet he was also increasingly aware of the electoral damage caused by Labour's internal divisions. In 1981, while still serving as Labour's education spokesman, Kinnock was alleged to have effectively scuppered Tony Benn's attempt to replace Denis Healey as Labour's Deputy Leader by first supporting the candidacy of the more traditionalist Tribunite John Silkin and then urging Silkin supporters to abstain on the second, run-off, ballot. This tactical manoeuvring demonstrated Kinnock's growing political sophistication and his determination to prevent the hard left from gaining complete control of the party leadership. In his opinion, the party "needed the contest like we needed bubonic plague".

Following Labour's defeat in the general election of 1979, Kinnock's political orientation underwent an abrupt change. James Callaghan appointed Kinnock to the Shadow cabinet as education spokesman, thus ending his years as a back-bench "rebel". His ambition was noted by parliamentary colleagues, with David Owen's opposition to electoral college reforms attributed to concerns that such changes would favour Kinnock's eventual succession to the leadership. Kinnock remained as education spokesman following the resignation of Callaghan as Leader of the Labour Party and the election of Michael Foot as his successor in late 1980.

Kinnock became a member of the National Executive Committee of the Labour Party in October 1978. As Shadow Education Secretary, Kinnock developed expertise in education policy and became a prominent critic of Conservative education reforms. He used his position to advocate for comprehensive education and oppose proposals for education vouchers and the restoration of grammar schools. His work in this role enhanced his profile within the party and demonstrated his ability to handle a major policy portfolio.

The existential threat posed by the SDP-Liberal Alliance became clear when the Alliance achieved remarkable success in early by-elections. Shirley Williams won Crosby in November 1981, achieving what was then the biggest reversal in by-election history, whilst Roy Jenkins narrowly won Glasgow Hillhead in March 1982. Opinion polls regularly showed the Alliance ahead of both main parties, raising the real possibility that Labour could be reduced to third-party status.

Kinnock was known as a left winger, and gained prominence for his attacks on Margaret Thatcher's handling of the Falklands War in 1982. He questioned the government's conduct of the conflict and criticised what he saw as unnecessary military action, positions that reflected his anti-militarist stance but which proved unpopular with many voters who supported the war effort.

=== 1983 general election campaign ===
During the 1983 general election campaign, Kinnock delivered one of his most memorable speeches attacking the Conservative government's policies. Speaking in Bridgend just days before polling, his stark warning about the consequences of a Thatcher victory became emblematic of Labour's campaign message and helped establish Kinnock's reputation as a formidable orator:

If Margaret Thatcher wins on Thursday, I warn you not to be ordinary. I warn you not to be young. I warn you not to fall ill. And I warn you not to grow old.

Despite such passionate campaigning, Labour suffered a devastating defeat, winning only 209 seats and securing just 27.6% of the vote—its worst performance since 1935. The SDP-Liberal Alliance won 25.4% of the vote, coming within just 2% of Labour's total and highlighting the existential threat facing the party. Only the first-past-the-post electoral system saved Labour from complete meltdown, as the Alliance won just 23 seats despite their substantial vote share.

The party's poor performance was attributed to several factors: the continuing popularity of Thatcher following the Falklands War, the split in the anti-Conservative vote caused by the SDP-Liberal Alliance, and Labour's adoption of what many voters saw as extreme left-wing policies including unilateral nuclear disarmament and widespread nationalisation.

Nevertheless, it was Labour's defeat that provided the context for Kinnock's election as party leader in October 1983. He had been an unswerving supporter of Michael Foot, and, partially as a repayment for his loyalty, Foot let it be known following his resignation as leader that he wanted Kinnock to succeed him. At 41, Kinnock's relatively young age and his ability to articulate Labour's values with passion and conviction made him an attractive candidate to modernise the party and restore its electoral prospects against both the Conservatives and the continuing threat from the SDP-Liberal Alliance.

== 1983 leadership election ==
Following Labour's landslide defeat at the 1983 general election, Michael Foot resigned as Leader of the Labour Party aged 69. The scale of the defeat (Labour's worst performance since 1935 with just 27.6% of the vote and 209 seats) created an immediate consensus that fundamental change was necessary. From the outset, it was expected that the much younger Kinnock would succeed him, with Foot himself privately indicating his preference for the Welsh MP to take over.

The leadership contest would be conducted under Labour's new electoral college system, introduced following the party's internal reforms of 1981. This system allocated 40% of the vote to affiliated trade unions, 30% to constituency Labour parties, and 30% to the Parliamentary Labour Party (a structure that had been bitterly contested during the party's period of internal warfare). The system had been designed to reduce the exclusive power of MPs to choose the leader, but it also meant that Kinnock would need to build a coalition across all three sections of the party to secure victory.

Kinnock announced his candidacy on 15 June 1983, immediately positioning himself as the unity candidate who could heal the party's divisions whilst maintaining its socialist principles. His main opponent was Roy Hattersley, the former Shadow Chancellor who represented the party's social democratic right wing. Eric Heffer, representing the hard left, and Peter Shore, a veteran Eurosceptic from the party's centre, also stood, though neither was expected to mount a serious challenge to the two front-runners. The contest highlighted the ideological tensions within the party, with Hattersley campaigning on a platform of immediate policy moderation whilst Kinnock argued for a more gradual approach that would maintain Labour's socialist identity whilst making the party electable.

Despite his reputation as a fiery orator, he demonstrated considerable tactical acumen in building support across the party's various factions. Crucially, he secured the backing of several major trade unions, including the Transport and General Workers' Union led by Ron Todd, who saw in Kinnock a leader who could bridge the gap between left-wing principles and electoral pragmatism. The concurrent deputy leadership contest featured Roy Hattersley, Gwyneth Dunwoody, Denis Healey, and Michael Meacher, with the prospect of a Kinnock-Hattersley partnership being actively promoted as a "dream ticket" that could unite the party's left and right wings.

Kinnock was elected as Labour Party leader on 2 October 1983, securing 71.3% of the electoral college vote (a decisive mandate that exceeded expectations). His vote was distributed as follows: 49.3% from trade unions, 27.4% from constituency parties, and 23.3% from MPs, demonstrating broad-based support across all sections of the party. Roy Hattersley was elected as his deputy with 67.3% of the vote, completing the anticipated "dream ticket".

At 41, Kinnock became the youngest leader in Labour's history, inheriting a party that faced existential challenges on multiple fronts. The Social Democratic Party/Liberal Alliance had won 25.4% of the vote (just 2.2% behind Labour) and threatened to displace the party as the main opposition to the Conservatives. The Alliance's strong performance had raised serious questions about Labour's long-term viability as a major political force. Internally, the party remained riven by factional warfare between the Militant tendency and other elements, whilst organisationally it remained dominated by trade union influence and activist control that many voters found off-putting. The party's policy positions (including unilateral nuclear disarmament, withdrawal from the European Economic Community, and extensive nationalisation) were deeply unpopular with the electorate, as the election result had starkly demonstrated.

The election of the "dream ticket" was generally welcomed by the media and political commentators as offering Labour its best hope of recovery. The Guardian described Kinnock as possessing "the energy and the vision to remake the Labour Party," whilst acknowledging the enormous task ahead. However, some observers questioned whether the partnership could hold together given the ideological differences between Kinnock and Hattersley, particularly on defence and economic policy. The Conservative reaction was notably sanguine, with Margaret Thatcher reportedly viewing Kinnock as less of a threat than other potential Labour leaders (an assessment that would prove premature as Kinnock transformed Labour into a formidable opposition force).

Kinnock's victory speech emphasised themes that would define his leadership: party unity, electability, and the need to reconnect with ordinary voters whilst maintaining Labour's core values. "We have won the right to lead," he declared, "now we must earn the right to govern."

== Early leadership challenges (1983–1985) ==
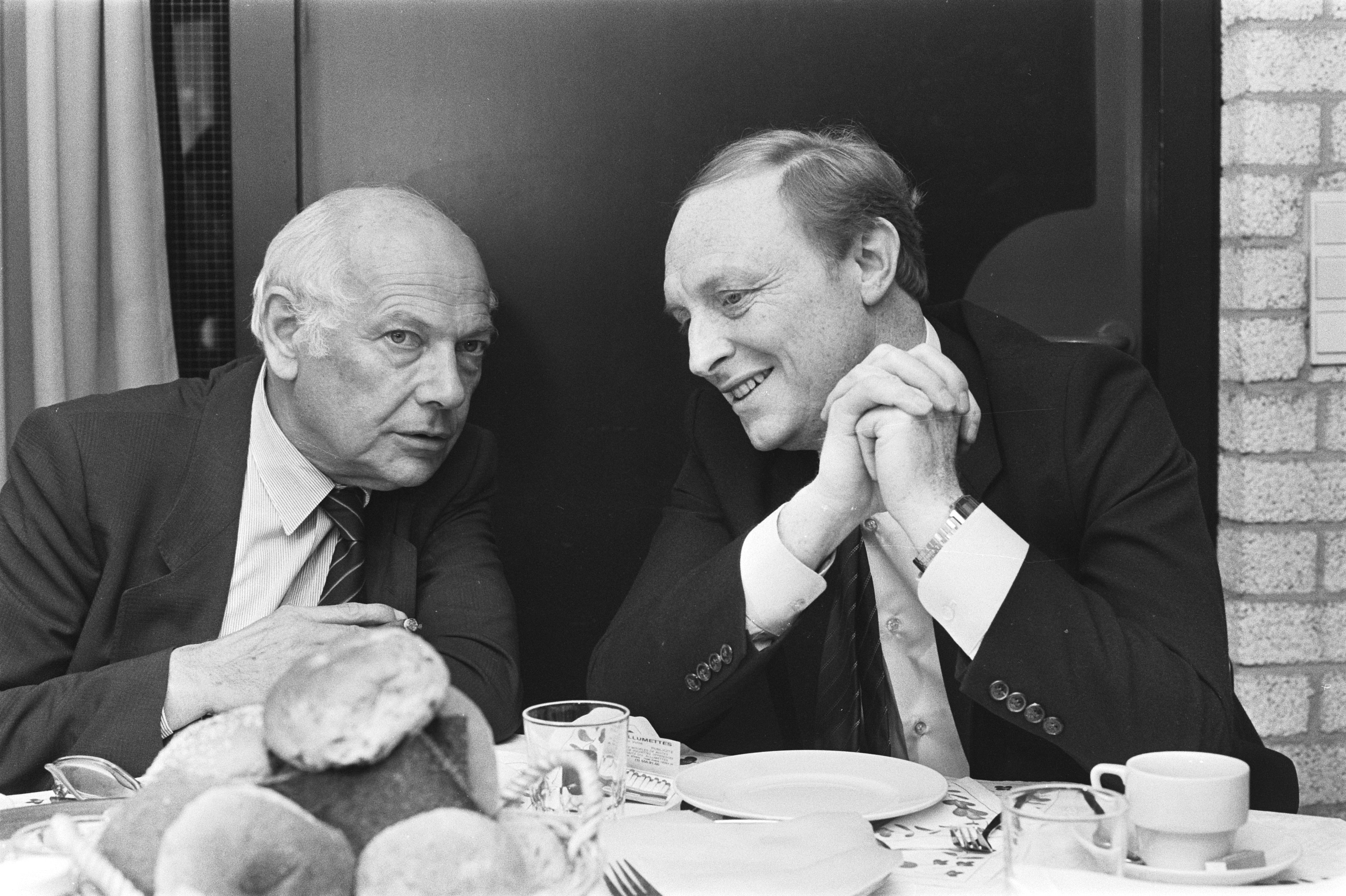
Kinnock meeting Dutch Labour Party leader Joop den Uyl in 1984

Kinnock's leadership faced immediate challenges from two interconnected issues that would shape his early tenure and establish his approach to party management. The first was the ongoing influence of the Trotskyist Militant tendency, which had infiltrated the party organisation and controlled several key constituency parties and councils. The second was the 1984–1985 miners' strike led by Arthur Scargill, which threatened to associate Labour with industrial conflict in the public perception.

=== Shadow Cabinet appointments and early reforms ===
On 31 October 1983, less than a month after becoming leader, Kinnock announced his first Shadow Cabinet. The appointments reflected his intention to balance the party's various factions whilst beginning the process of marginalising the most left-wing elements. Roy Hattersley became Deputy Leader and Shadow Chancellor, whilst veteran figures like Peter Shore (Shadow Leader of the House and Trade and Industry) and Denis Healey (Shadow Foreign Secretary) retained senior positions. Significantly, Kinnock appointed Gerald Kaufman as Shadow Home Secretary and John Silkin as Shadow Defence Secretary, both seen as moderating influences.

The new leader moved quickly to assert his authority over party organisation. In a notable early decision, he appointed Derek Foster, who had been serving as his Parliamentary Private Secretary, to contest the Chief Whip position. Foster's narrow victory over the favourite Norman Hogg by a single vote in 1985 demonstrated Kinnock's growing influence within the Parliamentary Labour Party.

Kinnock also began the process of modernising Labour's communications and public image. In 1985, he appointed Peter Mandelson as the party's Director of Communications, a crucial decision that would transform Labour's media strategy. Mandelson, who had previously worked as a television producer at London Weekend Television, brought professional media expertise to a party that had traditionally relied on amateur publicity efforts. Under his direction, Labour began to adopt more sophisticated campaigning techniques and a more disciplined approach to media relations.

=== The miners' strike and party tensions ===
Although Kinnock had come from the Tribune left wing of the party, he recognised that Labour's association with militant tactics was damaging to the party's electoral prospects. He was almost immediately placed in serious difficulty when Arthur Scargill led the National Union of Mineworkers (NUM) into a national strike without a nationwide ballot. Kinnock supported the aim of the strike—which he dubbed the "case for coal"—but, as an MP from a mining area, was bitterly critical of the tactics employed. When heckled at a Labour Party rally for referring to the killing of David Wilkie as "an outrage", Kinnock lost his temper and accused the hecklers of "living like parasites off the struggle of the miners" and implied that Scargill had lied to the striking miners.

Kinnock's criticism of Scargill's methods reflected a broader strategic calculation about Labour's electoral prospects. In 1985, he publicly criticised the strike's tactics at the Labour Party conference, arguing that the violence and the NUM leadership's attitude to court actions had been counterproductive:

The strike wore on. The violence built up because the single tactic chosen was that of mass picketing, and so we saw policing on a scale and with a system that has never been seen in Britain before. The court actions came, and by the attitude to the court actions, the NUM leadership ensured that they would face crippling damages as a consequence. To the question: "How did this position arise?", the man from the lodge in my constituency said: "It arose because nobody really thought it out."

This willingness to criticise a major trade union leader marked a significant departure from traditional Labour Party solidarity and demonstrated Kinnock's determination to distance the party from actions he considered electorally damaging. His relationship with Scargill would remain deeply antagonistic, with Kinnock later stating: "Oh I detest him. I did then, I do now, and it's mutual." Kinnock blamed Scargill for the failure of the strike.

=== Shadow Cabinet reshuffles and policy evolution ===
The October 1984 Shadow Cabinet elections provided Kinnock with an opportunity to reshape his team. On 26 October 1984, he conducted a significant reshuffle that reflected his evolving strategy. Most notably, he transferred Trade and Industry from Peter Shore to John Smith, a rising figure from the party's centre-right, whilst John Prescott replaced Smith as Shadow Employment Secretary. Gwyneth Dunwoody took over as Shadow Transport Secretary, and significantly, Eric Heffer, a prominent left-wing figure, was dropped from the Shadow Cabinet entirely.

These appointments reflected Kinnock's strategic approach to party management. By promoting figures like Smith and Prescott - both seen as more pragmatic than the outgoing left-wing appointees - he began the gradual process of shifting the party's centre of gravity whilst maintaining representation for different factions. The exclusion of Heffer, who had been a vocal supporter of Militant and other left-wing causes, sent a clear signal about the direction of party policy.

=== The 1985 conference speech and confronting Militant ===
The strike's defeat in March 1985 provided the backdrop for Kinnock's most decisive moment as leader. At the 1985 Labour Party conference, with the party's credibility damaged by association with both the failed strike and the chaotic behaviour of Militant-controlled Liverpool City Council, Kinnock delivered a devastating attack that would define his leadership and demonstrate his determination to reclaim the party from the Militant tendency.

Earlier in 1985, left-wing councils had protested at Government restriction of their budgets by refusing to set budgets, with the Militant-dominated Liverpool City Council creating particular chaos by issuing 31,000 redundancy notices to its own workers. In his conference speech, Kinnock launched a furious assault on Militant's conduct:

I'll tell you what happens with impossible promises. You start with far-fetched resolutions. They are then pickled into a rigid dogma, a code, and you go through the years sticking to that, outdated, misplaced, irrelevant to the real needs, and you end in the grotesque chaos of a Labour council – a Labour council – hiring taxis to scuttle round a city handing out redundancy notices to its own workers ... I am telling you, no matter how entertaining, how fulfilling to short-term egos – you can't play politics with people's jobs and with people's services or with their homes.

The speech was an important moment in establishing Kinnock's authority within the party. Eric Heffer, a Liverpool MP and member of the National Executive Committee, walked off the conference stage in disgust, but Kinnock had demonstrated his determination to assert control over the party's direction. The process culminated in June 1986 with the expulsion of Derek Hatton, deputy leader of Liverpool council and high-profile Militant supporter.

=== Left-wing reaction and accusations of betrayal ===
Kinnock's confrontational approach towards both Militant and the miners' strike generated intense criticism from the Labour left, who accused him of betraying the party's working-class base during a period of unprecedented Conservative assault on trade unions and industrial communities. The criticism was particularly painful for Kinnock given his own mining heritage - as he later reflected, "nothing hurt so much as the pain inflicted when Arthur Scargill persuaded some of the mineworkers that Kinnock, the son and grandson of Welsh miners, had betrayed them".

The miners' strike period represented "probably the worst 12 months of Kinnock's life". Critics from the left viewed his refusal to give unconditional support to the strike as tantamount to strikebreaking. At the 1984 Labour conference, Kinnock's attempt to appear even-handed by condemning violence "of the stone-throwers and battering ram-carriers" alongside "the violence of cavalry charges, the truncheon groups and the shield-bangers" was seen by many activists as a false equivalence that ignored the scale of state violence deployed against miners.

Left-wing critics argued that Kinnock was prioritising electoral respectability over solidarity with workers facing the most sustained attack on trade union rights since the 1920s. Tony Benn, who later came to view Kinnock as "the great betrayer", represented this perspective, arguing that the party was "paying the price" for "soft-pedalling our advocacy for socialism". The impact of Kinnock's 1985 conference speech against Militant was particularly traumatic for party activists. One observer noted that the conference emitted "a curious sound as if it had been wounded", with Tony Benn reduced to tears, comforting a young delegate whilst lamenting: "I just can't understand what they've done to our party".

This sense of betrayal was compounded by the timing of Kinnock's actions. Critics argued that whilst Margaret Thatcher was "ripping like a hurricane through the labour movement's hard-won post-war gains - the welfare state, near-full employment, and trade union rights - Kinnock chose to lay into those within his own ranks desperately trying to mount some sort of defence". Many on the left saw Kinnock as attacking the wrong enemy at the wrong time, focusing internal battles when the party should have been uniting against Conservative policies that were devastating industrial communities across Britain.

The left's criticism extended beyond specific tactical disagreements to fundamental questions about the direction of the Labour Party. Kinnock's willingness to distance himself from militant trade unionism and left-wing councils was seen as part of a broader accommodation with Thatcherism that would ultimately lead to the emergence of New Labour. Contemporary left-wing analyses suggested that Kinnock was laying the groundwork for Labour's eventual transformation into "an overt party of big business", sacrificing socialist principles for electoral acceptability.

Despite these criticisms, Kinnock's strategy succeeded in establishing his authority within the party. By 1986, according to The Economist, his personal dominance within the Labour Party had "come to exceed that of any Labour Party leader since Clement Attlee in the 1940s and 1950s". However, the cost of this authority - in terms of alienating substantial sections of the party's activist base and undermining Labour's connection to the trade union movement during its hour of greatest need - would continue to influence debates about Kinnock's legacy and the broader direction of the Labour Party for decades to come.

=== Party modernisation and policy reform ===
Having established his authority within the party, Kinnock embarked on a comprehensive modernisation programme designed to make Labour electable again. This involved both organisational reforms and fundamental policy changes that would distance the party from its left-wing image whilst maintaining its appeal to traditional supporters. The transformation was symbolised by Labour's adoption of a new logo—a continental social democratic style red rose replacing the party's old Liberty logo—under the direction of Kinnock's communications director Peter Mandelson.

Kinnock was determined to move the party's political standing to a more centrist position to improve its chances of winning a future general election. Under his leadership, the Labour Party began abandoning unpopular positions, particularly the wholesale nationalisation of industries, although this process would not be completed until Tony Blair revamped Clause IV in 1995. Kinnock stressed economic growth, which had broader appeal to the middle class than redistributive policies, and he accepted continued membership of the European Economic Community, reversing the party's previous commitment to immediate withdrawal.

The modernisation efforts showed early signs of success. By 1986, Labour was achieving excellent local election results and managed to seize the Fulham seat from the Conservatives at an April by-election. However, Labour still faced the persistent challenge of the SDP-Liberal Alliance, and many voters remained unconvinced by the party's transformation, particularly on defence policy where Labour maintained its commitment to unilateral nuclear disarmament.

== 1987 general election ==
The continuing threat from the SDP-Liberal Alliance became starkly apparent in early-1987 when Labour lost the Greenwich by-election to the SDP's Rosie Barnes on 26 February. This defeat raised the real possibility that Labour might finish third in the popular vote at the upcoming general election, potentially losing its status as Official Opposition. Coming after a series of impressive Alliance by-election victories, the Greenwich defeat confirmed that Labour's existential crisis remained unresolved after nearly four years of Kinnock's leadership.

Labour responded with a professionally managed campaign under Peter Mandelson's direction. The party's new approach was evident in a party election broadcast directed by Hugh Hudson (of Chariots of Fire fame) and popularly known as "Kinnock: The Movie". The broadcast featured scenes of Kinnock and his wife Glenys walking on the Great Orme in Llandudno to Beethoven's "Ode to Joy", intended to present him as a family man whilst connecting with a broader Welsh identity beyond the mining communities of his upbringing. The broadcast included his speech to the Welsh Labour Party conference asking why he was the "first Kinnock in a thousand generations" to go to university. The broadcast led to a 16-point increase in Kinnock's personal popularity ratings.

Kinnock's campaign speeches focused on unemployment (which remained above 3 million despite recent falls), the underfunding of the NHS, and inequality in Thatcher's Britain. However, Labour's campaign faced significant difficulties over defence policy. When interviewed by David Frost on 24 May, Kinnock claimed that Labour's alternative defence strategy in the event of a Soviet attack would be "using the resources you've got to make any occupation totally untenable". Thatcher responded two days later, attacking Labour's defence policy as a programme for "defeat, surrender, occupation, and finally, prolonged guerrilla fighting ... I do not understand how anyone who aspires to Government can treat the defence of our country so lightly".

The Conservative Party's campaign focused on lower taxes, a strong economy, and defence. The party noted that unemployment had fallen below 3 million for the first time since 1981, and that inflation was at 4% (its lowest level since the 1960s). [ell and Saatchi & Saatchi produced attack advertisements, including a poster showing a British soldier's arms raised in surrender with the caption "Labour's Policy On Arms" (a reference to Labour's policy of unilateral nuclear disarmament). The national newspapers largely backed the Conservative government, particularly The Sun, which published anti-Labour articles with headlines such as "Why I'm backing Kinnock, by Stalin".

The election results on 11 June reflected Kinnock's strategic focus on maintaining Labour's position as the main opposition. Labour secured 30.8% of the vote compared to the SDP-Liberal Alliance's 22.6%, a gap of 8.2 points that ended the Alliance's challenge to Labour's status. The Conservatives won 376 seats to Labour's 229, giving Thatcher a third consecutive victory with a majority of 102 seats. Labour gained 20 seats whilst remaining in opposition.

The election results revealed a geographically polarised Britain. The Conservatives dominated Southern England and gained additional seats from Labour in London, but performed poorly in Northern England, Scotland, and Wales, losing many seats they had won at previous elections. Labour made significant gains in Scotland and Wales but lost ground in key Southern constituencies, highlighting the electoral mountain they still needed to climb. Kinnock himself increased his share of the vote in Islwyn by almost 12%, demonstrating his continued strong personal support in Wales.

The election's significance for Labour lay in ending the SDP-Liberal Alliance as a threat to Labour's position. The Alliance's poor performance led to the merger of the SDP and Liberal parties into the Liberal Democrats in 1988, though this process involved the departure of David Owen and several other prominent SDP figures. Labour was now the undisputed main opposition party, setting up a binary choice against the Conservatives at future elections.

Kinnock acknowledged that whilst the result was disappointing, it had achieved the strategic objective of securing Labour's position as a major political force. The campaign had demonstrated the party's organisational competence, whilst the defeat of the Alliance ensured that Labour would face the Conservatives directly at the next election.

== Policy review and organisational change (1987–1990) ==
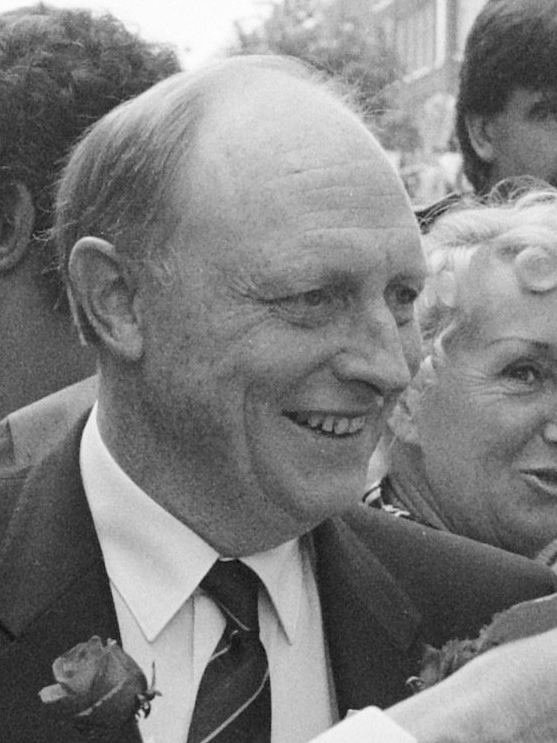
Kinnock in 1989

The 1987 election result provided Kinnock with the mandate to accelerate Labour's transformation through comprehensive policy reform. The second phase of his leadership was dominated by the Policy Review, a wide-ranging study designed to formulate popular policies and move the party towards electability. On 14 September 1987, Tom Sawyer, chairman of Labour's home policy committee, put forward the Policy Review plan in a paper after consultation with Kinnock. Sawyer's recommendations included how Labour could win back the skilled working class and reviewed the party's policies on enterprise, wealth creation, taxation, and social security.

The process began with "Labour Listens" in autumn 1987, a series of public consultations that marked a break with the party's traditional approach of formulating policies internally. The home policy committee voted overwhelmingly in favour of Sawyer's three-year plan to produce a new statement of Labour's policies by 1990, and the Labour Party's annual conference endorsed the Policy Review on 28 September 1987. However, the initiative faced criticism from MPs on the party's left, with Tony Benn unsuccessfully proposing an alternative paper titled "The Aims and Objectives of the Labour Party" that included proposals for leaving NATO, ending nuclear power, and abolishing the House of Lords.

The first stage of the Policy Review reported on 25 May 1988, producing seven policy reports containing 40,000 words. Policies traditionally supported by the Labour left, including withdrawal from the European Economic Community and extensive nationalisation, were abandoned, as were very high income tax rates for top earners. By 1988, the party had produced a new statement of aims and values modelled on Anthony Crosland's social-democratic thinking, emphasising equality rather than public ownership. On 5 June 1988, Kinnock announced that Labour would not unilaterally abolish Britain's nuclear weapons but would use Trident as a bargaining chip to achieve multilateral nuclear disarmament.

The policy changes provoked significant internal opposition. Tony Benn launched an eight-month campaign challenging Kinnock for the leadership in 1988, calling it a "campaign for socialism" and arguing that the party was not electable if it pursued its current course. Benn's supporters launched their own manifesto, but the challenge lacked full support even from the party's left wing, with David Blunkett arguing that any challenge would certainly result in defeat and give Kinnock an air of "omnipotence". On 2 October 1988, Kinnock won the leadership contest with 89% of the electoral college vote, a result interpreted as an endorsement of the Policy Review. The day after Kinnock's victory, the Labour Party conference endorsed the Policy Review by a margin of 5 to 1.

The policy review coincided with a significant improvement in Labour's electoral fortunes; Labour came first in the 1989 European Parliament election, winning 39% of the vote; the first time Labour had topped a national poll since 1974. This was driven largely by the unpopular poll tax which was destroying Conservative support. The Community Charge, as it was officially known, replaced domestic rates with a flat-rate tax that proved deeply unpopular across all social classes. Introduced in Scotland in April 1989 and England and Wales in April 1990, the tax sparked widespread civil disobedience, with millions refusing to pay and mass demonstrations culminating in the Trafalgar Square riot of 31 March 1990. Kinnock initially criticised the violence, describing protesters as "Toy Town revolutionaries" whilst supporting Labour's opposition to the tax itself.

In December 1989, Kinnock completed another break with Labour's past by abandoning the party's support for closed shops, a decision that further distanced the party from its image of being controlled by trade unions. The abandonment of closed shops was particularly symbolic as it represented a rejection of one of the trade union movement's most cherished principles, demonstrating Kinnock's determination to modernise the party's relationship with organised labour.

By 1990, the Policy Review had transformed Labour's commitments in areas where the party seemed most out of line with voters, including nationalisation, trade union power, high taxation, and defence. The final stage of the review was completed in 1990 with the publication of "Looking to the Future", which laid out Labour's new policy framework. The document accepted most of the Conservative privatisations and abandoned plans for widespread re-nationalisation, whilst maintaining Labour's commitment to social justice through different means. The party also introduced constitutional reforms that reduced the influence of local party activists in policy-making and strengthened the leadership's control over party organisation and communications. However, Thatcher's departure removed a major electoral asset for Labour, as polling showed that Kinnock's personal ratings relative to Major were less favourable than they had been against Thatcher.

The transformation was not without significant opposition from the party's left wing, who viewed Kinnock's modernisation as a betrayal of Labour's socialist principles. Tony Benn, the standard-bearer of the Labour left, became increasingly critical of Kinnock's leadership, describing his interviews in 1984 as "like processed cheese coming out of a mincing machine". The left's anger intensified as Kinnock continued to distance himself from traditional socialist policies and confronted left-wing councils and trade unions. Many on the left felt that whilst Margaret Thatcher was dismantling the post-war consensus and attacking trade union rights, Kinnock was directing his fire against Labour's own supporters rather than the Conservative government.

The economic and social devastation of the period provided a stark backdrop to these political struggles. Coal mining employment, which had stood at 247,000 in 1976, fell dramatically to 44,000 by 1993. Between 1979 and 1990, Margaret Thatcher's government closed 115 coal mines, representing 80% of all mining jobs lost during her tenure. The closure programme accelerated following the miners' strike, devastating mining communities across South Wales, Yorkshire, and other traditional Labour heartlands. Kinnock, despite his own mining heritage, supported the principle that uneconomic pits should close whilst calling for proper consultation and support for affected communities.

Labour's response to the continuing pit closures reflected the party's difficult position during the era of deindustrialisation. Whilst supporting miners' right to defend their livelihoods, Kinnock recognised that the party was caught between "unstoppable economic restructuring and job losses that affected its traditional voters". When Terry Fields, the Militant-supporting Labour MP, was imprisoned in July 1991 for refusing to pay the poll tax, Kinnock commented that "law makers must not be law breakers", further infuriating the left who saw this as abandoning a principled Labour MP. The left viewed such statements as evidence that Kinnock had completely abandoned Labour's working-class roots in favour of middle-class respectability.

The organisational changes were accompanied by broader shifts in party culture and approach. Under Kinnock's leadership, Labour adopted new campaigning techniques, developed its media relations under Peter Mandelson, and formulated policies designed to appeal to a wider electoral base whilst retaining the party's commitment to social justice. The period also saw Labour grappling with other major political developments, including the Gulf War of 1991, where Kinnock supported the international coalition whilst criticising the government's consultation of Parliament. By 1990, opinion polls showed Labour consistently ahead of the Conservatives, suggesting that the combination of policy modernisation and Conservative unpopularity had made the party electable.

== 1992 general election ==
When Margaret Thatcher resigned in November 1990, Kinnock initially celebrated, describing it as "very good news" and demanding an immediate general election. However, the elevation of John Major as Conservative leader and Prime Minister transformed the political landscape. Major's more conciliatory style and his replacement of the poll tax with council tax neutralised many of the issues that had been driving support towards Labour. Despite the deepening recession, Labour's substantial poll leads evaporated, with some surveys showing the Conservatives ahead by 1991.

As 1992 dawned, the recession had still not ended and unemployment topped 2.5 million, but most opinion polls suggested either a hung parliament or a narrow Labour victory. Major called the election on 11 March 1992, as was widely expected, the day after Chancellor Norman Lamont had delivered the Budget. Parliament was dissolved on 16 March, with polling day set for 9 April. Labour entered the campaign confident, having gained four seats from the Conservatives in by-elections since 1987 and with the party transformed into what appeared to be a credible alternative government.

=== The campaign ===
The parties campaigned on the familiar battlegrounds of taxation and healthcare. Major became known for delivering his speeches whilst standing on an upturned soapbox during public meetings, abandoning the overly cautious battle-plan of "John Major in the round" events limited to supporters. Starting in Luton on 28 March, Major's soapbox tour became the defining image of his campaign, allowing him to engage directly with voters including hecklers whilst projecting an image of ordinary accessibility that contrasted with the more stage-managed Labour events.

The Conservative campaign focused heavily on taxation, producing memorable attack advertisements including the "Labour's Double-Whammy" poster showing a boxer wearing gloves marked "tax rises" and "inflation". The party successfully exploited Labour's John Smith's "shadow budget", which proposed increases in National Insurance contributions on higher earners to fund improvements to child benefit and the state pension. The Conservatives presented this as a "tax bombshell" that would threaten the aspirations of Middle England voters.

Labour suffered a significant early setback with the "War of Jennifer's Ear" controversy. On 24 March, Labour broadcast a party election broadcast about a five-year-old girl with glue ear who had waited a year for a simple operation, contrasting her case with that of a girl who received quick private treatment. The broadcast was intended to highlight alleged Conservative underfunding of the NHS, but when the girl was identified as Jennifer Bennett, a fierce political row erupted over the accuracy of the broadcast and the ethics of using a child's illness for political advantage. The controversy dominated news coverage for several days, derailing Labour's attempts to make healthcare a central campaign issue and forcing the party to largely avoid the subject thereafter.

Immigration also became a contentious issue when Home Secretary Kenneth Baker made a controversial speech claiming that under Labour, "the floodgates would be opened for immigrants from developing countries". There was also confusion within Labour's Shadow Cabinet over the party's stance on proportional representation, with different spokespersons giving contradictory statements about potential electoral reform.

=== The Sheffield Rally ===
The campaign's most notorious moment came with Labour's rally at Sheffield Arena on 1 April 1992. The event, in preparation for eighteen months and costing £100,000, was attended by 10,000 Labour Party members including the entire shadow cabinet. The rally was the brainchild of strategist Philip Gould, modelled on American presidential conventions with sound and light performances and celebrity endorsements. Kinnock was flown in by helicopter and the shadow cabinet paraded through the crowd to the stage, being introduced with titles such as "The next Home Secretary" and "The next Prime Minister".

The rally culminated with an emotional Kinnock taking the podium and shouting what was generally reported as "We're all right!" four times, though Kinnock later claimed he had shouted "Well all right!" in the manner of a rock and roll singer. Although Labour's internal polls suggested the event had little effect on the party's support, media commentators thought the rally appeared "triumphalist" to television viewers. Opinion polls on 1 April (dubbed "Red Wednesday") had shown a clear Labour lead, but this fell considerably in the following day's polls, with many observers blaming the Sheffield Rally for the decline.

In later interviews, Kinnock expressed regret about the event, particularly criticising the last-minute change of choreography that added to the triumphalist impression. "There was a sort of tangible political heat coming off it," he reflected. "So instead of modest competence, which is what I wanted to portray, and most of the campaign did, we had this entry into the arena." However, subsequent analysis has questioned whether the rally was genuinely decisive, with some arguing it merely provided a convenient explanation for Labour's defeat after the fact.

=== Media hostility and the final days ===
The Conservative-supporting press maintained a hostile campaign against Labour throughout. The Sun ran a series of anti-Labour articles culminating on election day with the front-page headline "If Kinnock wins today, will the last person to leave Britain please turn out the lights", featuring Kinnock's head in a lightbulb. The Daily Mail and Daily Express carried tables and real-life cases purporting to show how much more ordinary people would pay under Labour's tax proposals, with focus groups finding that these tabloids were a key source of information for many floating voters.

=== The result and aftermath ===
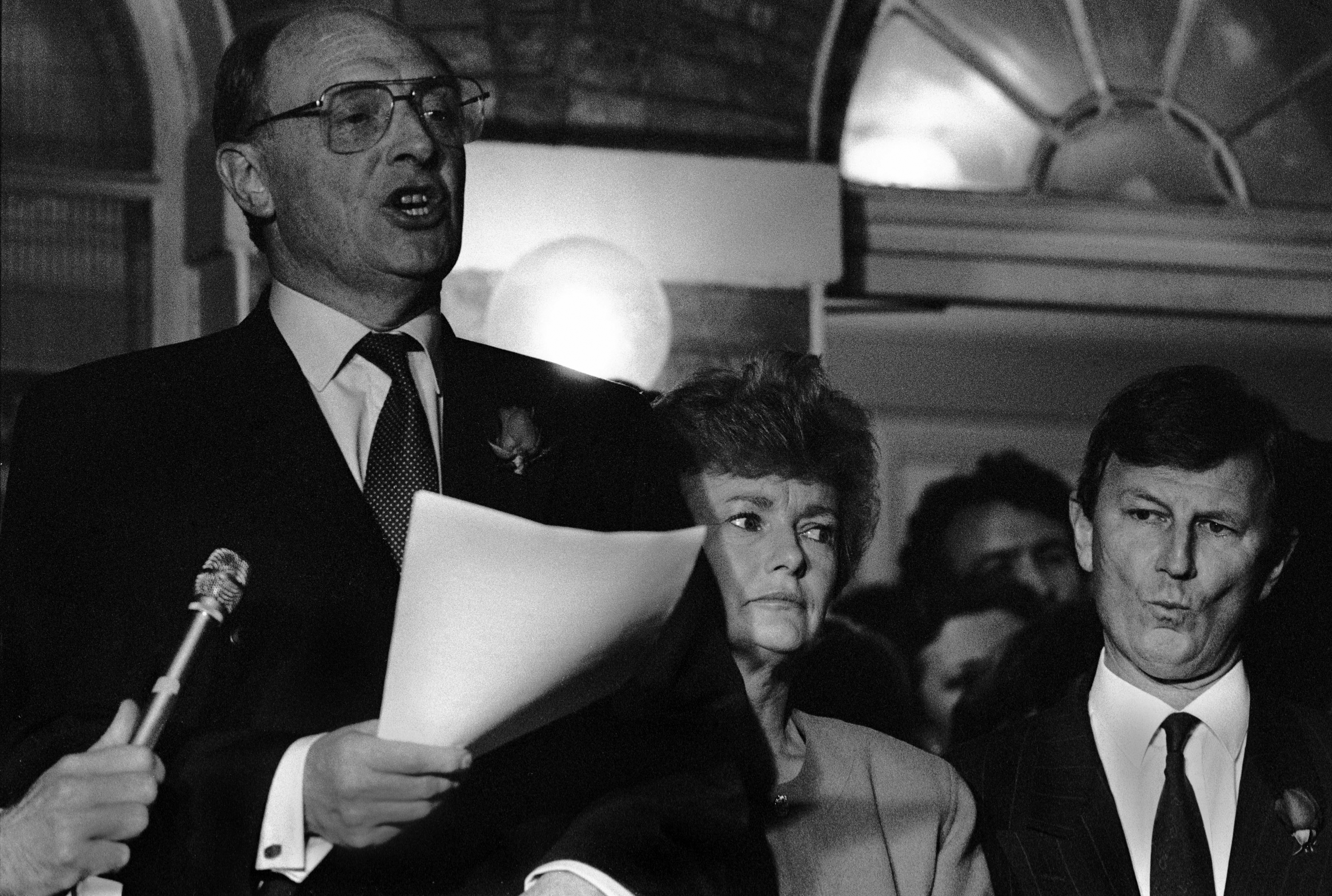
Kinnock conceding the 1992 general election

The Conservatives won a fourth consecutive term with a majority of 21 seats, confounding polls and commentators who had predicted either a hung parliament or narrow Labour victory. The party secured 14.1 million votes (the highest total ever recorded by any British party) and 41.9% of the vote, compared to Labour's 11.5 million votes and 34.4%. The result took many by surprise, leading to an inquiry into polling methodology and widespread analysis of what had gone wrong for Labour.

Post-election polling found that 49% of voters thought they would be worse off under Labour's tax policies, compared to 30% who thought they would benefit. The Conservative tax campaign appeared to have been successful in "rationalising Tory waverers' decision to vote Conservative" whilst playing on broader fears about Labour's economic competence. The defeat was particularly crushing given Labour's expectations of victory and the widespread belief that after thirteen years of Conservative rule, it was time for change.

Kinnock resigned as party leader on 13 April 1992, ending a nine-year tenure that had transformed Labour from what some considered an unelectable protest movement into a credible party of government. In his resignation speech, he blamed The Sun and other right-wing media for Labour's defeat, though the following day's Sun headline "It's The Sun Wot Won It" was later described by Rupert Murdoch as "tasteless and wrong".

== Post-parliamentary career ==
Kinnock announced his resignation as Leader of the Labour Party on 13 April 1992, ending nearly a decade in the role. John Smith, previously Shadow Chancellor, was elected on 18 July as his successor.

Kinnock remained on the Advisory Council of the Institute for Public Policy Research, which he helped set up in the 1980s.

Kinnock was an enthusiastic supporter of Ed Miliband's campaign for the Leadership of the Labour Party in 2010, and was reported as telling activists, when Miliband won, "We've got our party back" – although Miliband, like Kinnock, failed to lead the party back into government, and resigned after the Conservatives were re-elected with a small majority in 2015. Labour received their lowest seat tally under Miliband since the 1987 general election; when Kinnock was leader at that time.

In 2011, he participated in the Welsh family history television programme Coming Home where he discovered hitherto unknown information about his family.

He is a vice president of the Fabian Society.

=== European Union Commissioner ===
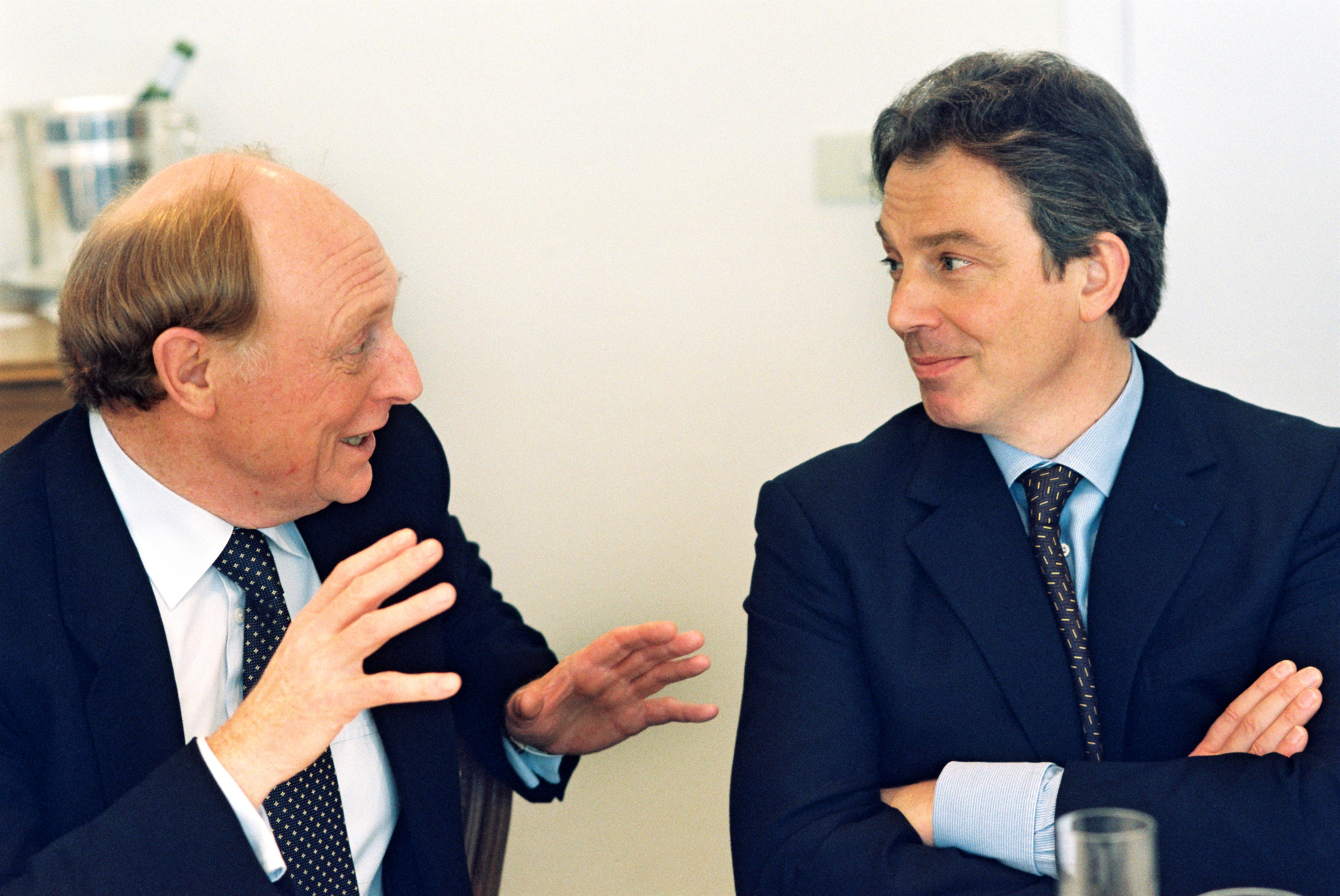
Kinnock with Tony Blair in 2000

Kinnock was appointed one of the UK's two members of the European Commission, which he served first as Transport Commissioner under President Jacques Santer, in early 1995; marking the end of his 25 years in the House of Commons. This appointment occurred less than a year after the death of his successor John Smith and Tony Blair's subsequent election as party leader.

Kinnock was obliged to resign as part of the forced, collective resignation of the Commission in 1999. He was re-appointed to the Commission under new President Romano Prodi. He now became one of the Vice-Presidents of the European Commission, with responsibility for Administrative Reform and the Audit, Linguistics and Logistics Directorates General. His term of office as a Commissioner was due to expire on 30 October 2004, but was delayed owing to the withdrawal of the new Commissioners. During his second Commission term, he oversaw the introduction of new staff regulations for EU officials, which included substantial salary reductions for staff employed after 1 May 2004, reduced pension entitlements for existing employees, and revised employment conditions. These reforms generated significant opposition among EU staff, though the budgetary pressures driving the changes had been mandated by Member States through the Council.

In February 2004, it was announced that with effect from 1 November 2004, Kinnock would become head of the British Council. Coincidentally, at the same time, his son Stephen became head of the British Council branch in Saint Petersburg, Russia. At the end of October, it was announced that he would become a Member of the House of Lords (intending to be a working peer), when he was able to leave his EU responsibilities. In 1977, he had remained in the House of Commons, with Dennis Skinner, while other MPs walked to the Lords to hear the Queen's speech opening the new parliament. He had dismissed going to the Lords in recent interviews. Kinnock explained his change of attitude, despite the continuing presence of ninety hereditary peers and appointment by patronage, by asserting that the Lords was a good base for campaigning.

=== Life peerage ===
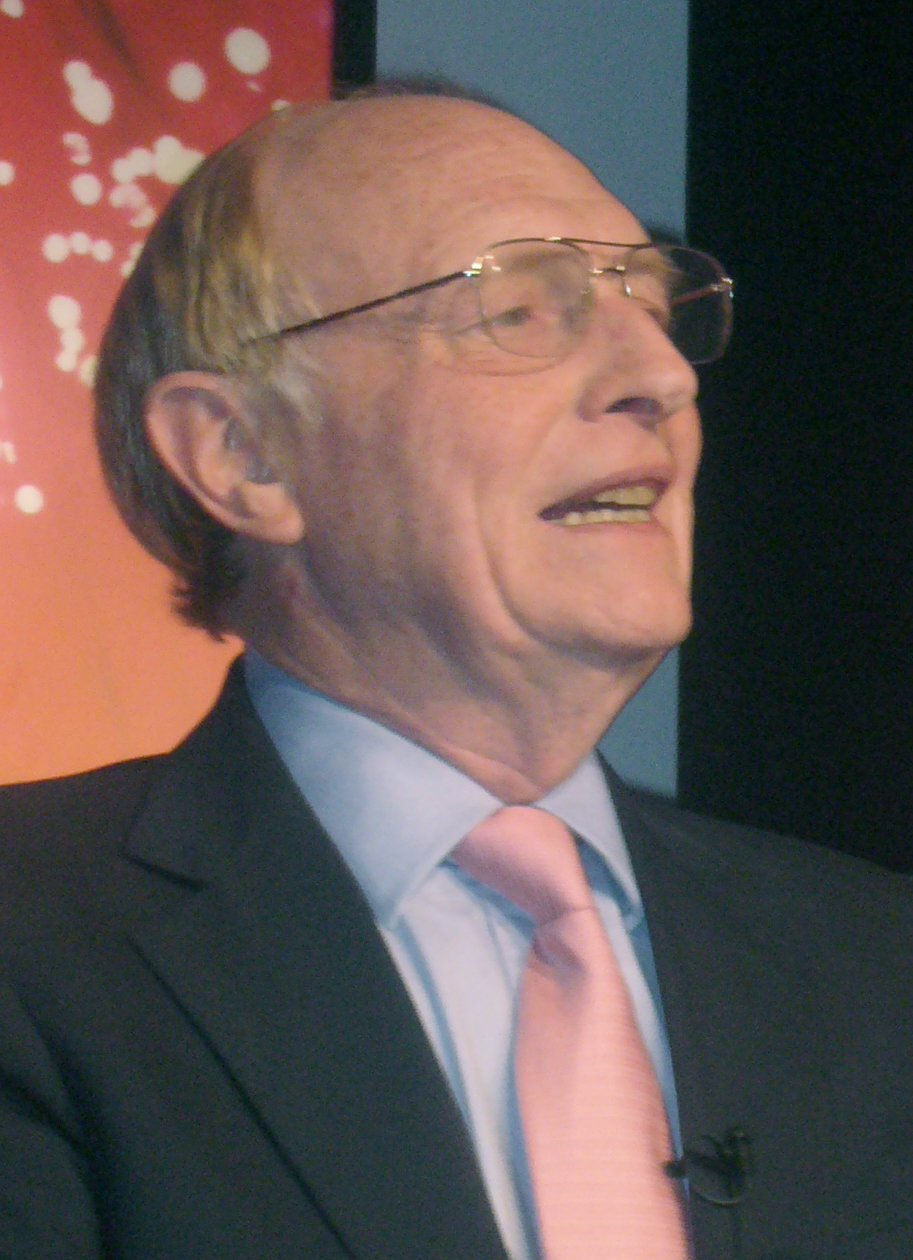
Kinnock in 2007

On 28 January 2005, Kinnock was created a life peer as Baron Kinnock, of Bedwellty in the County of Gwent, and was introduced to the House of Lords on 31 January 2005. On assuming his seat, he stated: "I accepted the kind invitation to enter the House of Lords as a working peer for practical political reasons." When his peerage was first announced, he said: "It will give me the opportunity ... to contribute to the national debate on issues like higher education, research, Europe and foreign policy."

Kinnock's peerage meant that the Labour and Conservative parties were equal in numbers in the upper house of Parliament (subsequently the number of Labour members overtook the number of Conservative members for several years). He was a long-time critic of the House of Lords, and his acceptance of a peerage led him to be accused of hypocrisy by Will Self, among others.

== Views ==
=== Early political positions ===
Kinnock's early political career was characterised by firmly left-wing positions typical of the Tribune Group within the Labour Party. Political observers described him as holding left-wing views on most matters and talking in the language of the radical post-Bevan left. By 1974, he was described as a vocal advocate of the standard left-wing position on nuclear weapons, the Common Market, public ownership, incomes policy, and arms embargoes to South Africa, Chile, and El Salvador.

During the 1970s, Kinnock was a fierce critic of the Labour governments of Harold Wilson and James Callaghan. He rejected offers of ministerial positions on ideological grounds, with one Conservative newspaper labelling him a "left wing fanatic" in 1978. In December 1974, he wrote an article on nationalisation in Labour Monthly, delivering a bitter criticism of the capitalist system. In 1978, at the Labour National Executive Committee, he advocated for reflation, increased spending on health, job-swap schemes, better housing, and ending stock relief for businesses.

Kinnock condemned the Labour government following its election defeat in 1979, saying that for the third time the Labour Party had saved capitalism, and lost. As late as October 1984, after becoming party leader, he was still describing the market system as short-sighted and speculative, arguing it would never produce the plenty necessary to meet human need.

=== Anti-apartheid ===
At Cardiff University, Kinnock organised protests against apartheid in South Africa, campaigning for the release of Nelson Mandela. This anti-apartheid activism continued throughout his parliamentary career, and in 2014 he was awarded the Order of the Companions of O.R. Tambo by South Africa for his "excellent contribution to constantly speaking the truth during the apartheid period" and for fighting for Mandela's release whilst supporting those in exile.

=== Welsh identity and devolution ===
Kinnock is a supporter of Welsh devolution, with proposals for a Welsh Assembly included in the Labour Party's 1992 manifesto when he was leader. However, in the build up to the 1979 Welsh devolution referendum, the Labour government was in favour of devolution for Wales. Kinnock was among only six South Wales MPs who opposed devolution, supporting an amendment to the Wales Act requiring not merely a simple majority, but also support from 40% of the entire electorate. He later clarified that he supports devolution in principle, but found the proposed settlement at the time as failing to address the economic disparities in the UK, particularly following the closure of coal mines in Wales. In 2023, Kinnock supported a paper outlining an expanded devolution settlement by Centre Think Tank called "Devolution Revolution" which he described as offering a clear route map towards workable and fair devolution for the whole of the UK.

=== Evolution from left to centre ===
Kinnock's political journey from the left wing to a more centrist position became evident during his leadership of the Labour Party. By October 1988, he was telling Labour Party conference delegates of his intention to work within the market economy, stating that even after years of Labour government implementation, there would still be a market economy. This represented a significant shift from his earlier position that the market system could never produce sufficient plenty to meet human needs.

The transformation accelerated with the Policy Review process after 1987, where Kinnock moved the party away from traditional socialist policies. He was instrumental in abandoning the party's commitment to widespread nationalisation and unilateral nuclear disarmament, instead embracing a social democratic approach modelled on Anthony Crosland's thinking, which emphasised equality rather than public ownership. While at university, Kinnock participated in Campaign for Nuclear Disarmament activities and was a member and frequent speaker for CND in his early political career. As Labour leader, he initially supported the party's policy of unilateral nuclear disarmament. By 1989 he had abandoned this position, later saying that he had been misguided in his early support for CND. In 2015, he warned Jeremy Corbyn that the British people would not vote for unilateral disarmament.

=== Economic and taxation policy ===
Kinnock has consistently advocated for progressive taxation, particularly wealth taxes. In 2025, he called for a 2% annual wealth tax on assets above £10 million, which he argued would raise over £12 billion annually. He has also suggested removing VAT exemptions on private healthcare to provide funding for public services.

Kinnock has warned against raising income tax, arguing that this would burden people whose real incomes have stagnated over recent decades. On nationalisation, Kinnock has evolved from his early left-wing positions. In 2022, he described nationalisation as a means for operation rather than a political or economic end, and supported Gordon Brown's call for temporary nationalisation of energy firms unable to offer decreased prices, though he questioned the word "temporary".

=== Social policy and welfare ===
In 2025, Kinnock called for the government to scrap the two-child limit, describing rising levels of child poverty as something that would make Charles Dickens furious. He suggested such measures could be funded by a wealth tax on the top 1% of earners, describing his approach as the economics of Robin Hood.

=== Immigration and demographics ===
Kinnock supports controlled immigration whilst recognising demographic realities. He argues that all countries must have effective control of their borders but emphasises that the UK's rapidly ageing population means extending welcome to people with relevant skills will be necessary for economic prosperity. He has criticised the inclusion of university students in immigration statistics, describing this practice as incompetent and misleading since most students return to their home countries or work elsewhere after graduation.

On the broader immigration debate, Kinnock has stated that whilst immigration is fundamental to addressing demographic challenges, open borders are impossible in a world unbalanced by climate change and asymmetrical economics, requiring managed migration balanced by the development of domestic skills.

=== Defence and foreign policy ===
Kinnock favours defence bonds to finance increased defence expenditure, citing their successful use in financing previous conflicts. He believes that the UK has been engaged in an undeclared technological and propaganda war waged by Russia and, to a considerable extent, China.

=== Brexit ===
Kinnock strongly opposed Brexit. In 2018, he stated that Britain could either take the risks and costs of leaving the EU or have the stability, growth and revenues vital for crucial public services like the NHS and social care, and argued for stopping Brexit to save the NHS or seeking European Economic Area membership.

=== Contemporary political strategy ===
Kinnock has been highly critical of Labour's approach to combating Reform UK, describing elements within the party encouraging appeasement as fundamentally wrong. He argues that if people are offered two versions of a particular political brand, they will always choose the genuine one, and believes accomplishment in government is the best way to counter populist politics.

== Personal life ==
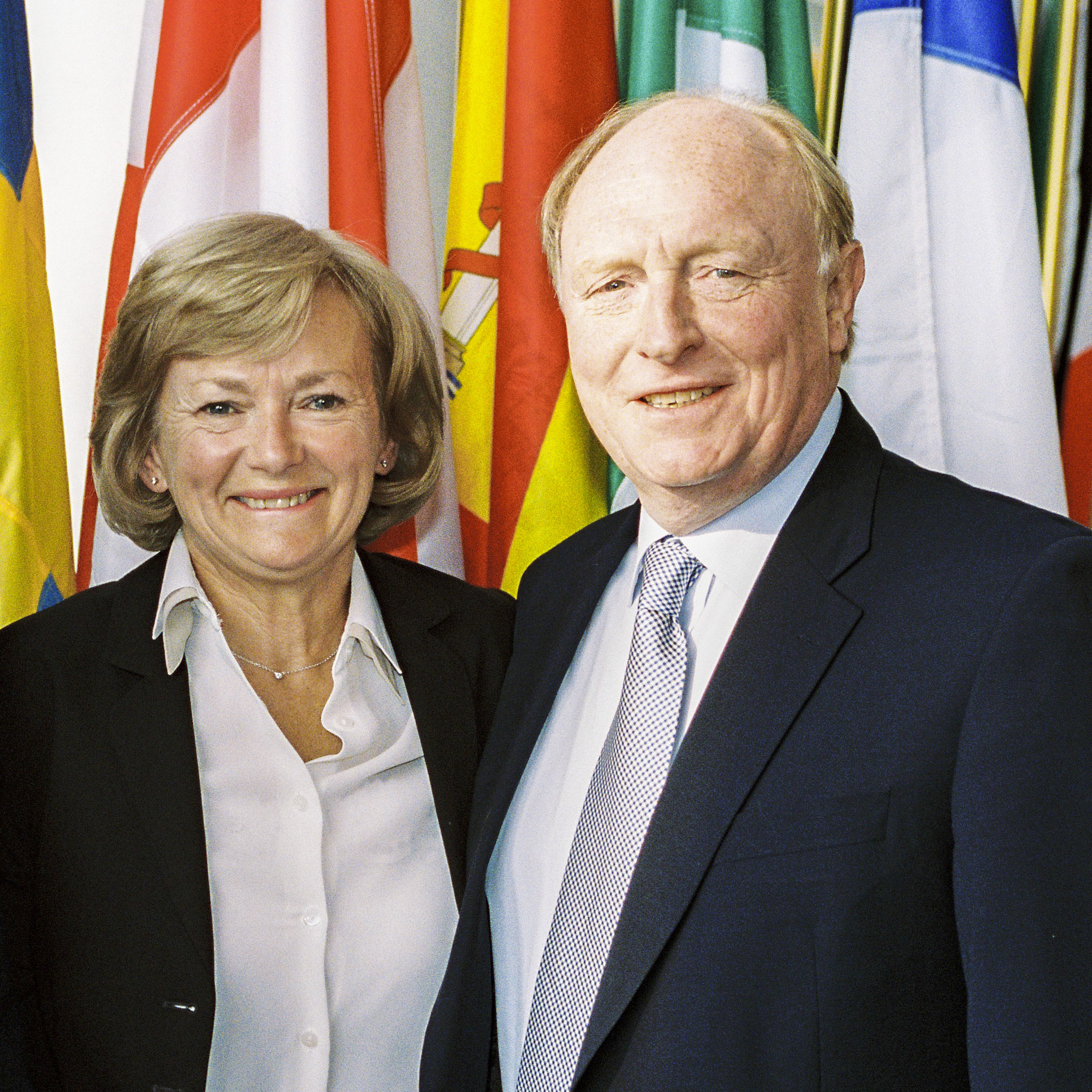
Neil and Glenys Kinnock in 2002

Kinnock met Glenys Kinnock (née Parry) in the early 1960s whilst studying at University College, Cardiff, where they were known as "the power and the glory" - with Glenys characterised as "the power" - and married on 25 March 1967. His wife was the UK's Minister for Africa and the United Nations from 2009–2010, and a Labour Member of the European Parliament (MEP) from 1994–2009. Her elevation to the peerage in 2009 made them among the few married couples to hold hereditary or life titles independently. In 2008, they relocated from Peterston-super-Ely, a village near Cardiff, to Tufnell Park, London, to be closer to their daughter and their grandchildren. For many years, while Kinnock was an MP, the couple had lived in Clovelly Road, Ealing. Glenys' death was announced on 3 December 2023.

They have a son, Stephen, and a daughter, Rachel, who works in the media and in 2025 became a trustee of The Jo Cox Foundation. Stephen Kinnock is married to Helle Thorning-Schmidt, who was Prime Minister of Denmark from 2011 to 2015.

On 26 April 2006, Kinnock was given a six-month driving ban after being found guilty of two speeding offences along the M4 motorway, west of London.

Kinnock is a Cardiff City F.C. fan and regularly attends matches. He is a follower of rugby union and supports London Welsh RFC at club level, regularly attending Wales games.

He was portrayed by both Chris Barrie and Steve Coogan in the satirical TV programme Spitting Image, and by Euan Cuthbertson in the Scottish film In Search of La Che.

In 2014, Kinnock was painted by artist Edward Sutcliffe. The portrait was exhibited at the Royal Society of Portrait Painters Annual Exhibition that year.

Kinnock has been described as an agnostic and an atheist. He is a Patron of Humanists UK.

Parliament of the United Kingdom
Preceded by Harold Finch	Member of Parliament for Bedwellty; 1970–1983	Constituency abolished
New constituency	Member of Parliament for Islwyn; 1983–1995	Succeeded by Don Touhig
Political offices
Preceded by Mark Carlisle	Shadow Secretary of State for Education and Science; 1979–1983	Succeeded by Giles Radice
Preceded by Michael Foot	Leader of the Opposition; 1983–1992	Succeeded by John Smith
Preceded by Bruce Millan	British European Commissioner; 1995–2004; Served alongside: Chris Patten	Succeeded by Peter Mandelson
Preceded by Karel Van Miert as European Commissioner for Transport, Credit, Investment, and Consumer Protection	European Commissioner for Transport; 1995–1999	Succeeded by Loyola de Palacio as European Commissioner for Parliamentary Relations, Transport and Energy
Preceded by Erkki Liikanen as European Commissioner for Budget, Personnel and Administration	European Commissioner for Administrative Reform; 1999–2004	Succeeded by Siim Kallas as European Commissioner for Administrative Affairs, Audit and Anti-Fraud
Party political offices
Preceded by Michael Foot	Leader of the Labour Party; 1983–1992	Succeeded by John Smith
Preceded by Syd Tierney	Chair of the Labour Party; 1987–1988	Succeeded by Dennis Skinner
Orders of precedence in the United Kingdom
Preceded by Chris Patten	Gentlemen; Baron Kinnock	Followed by The Lord Stevens of Kirkwhelpington
