= 1995 Islwyn by-election =

UK parliamentary by-election

- 16 February 1995

The Islwyn seat in the House of Commons. Elected by simple majority using first past the post. Triggered by resignation of incumbent
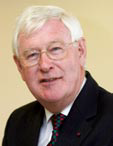

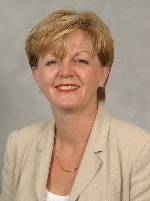
			LD
Candidate	Don Touhig	Jocelyn Davies	John Bushell
Party	Labour	Plaid Cymru	Liberal Democrats
Popular vote	16,030	2,933	2,448
Percentage	69.2	12.7	10.6
Swing	▼5.1pp	▲8.8pp	▲4.9pp
Member of Parliament before election
Neil Kinnock
Labour
Elected Member of Parliament
Don Touhig
Labour

A by-election was held in the Welsh parliamentary constituency of Islwyn on 16 February 1995 following the resignation on 20 January of Neil Kinnock who was appointed as a European Commissioner.

Whilst being a safe Labour seat and a comfortable victory, the Conservative party suffered a serious drop in support which saw them lose their election deposit, gaining less than 5% of the vote. The Conservative candidate, Robert Buckland, would later be elected as MP for South Swindon 15 years later, and would go on to serve in the cabinet.

== Result ==
1995 Islwyn by-election
Party	Candidate	Votes	%	±%
Labour	Don Touhig	16,030	69.2	−5.1
Plaid Cymru	Jocelyn Davies	2,933	12.7	+8.8
Liberal Democrats	John Bushell	2,448	10.6	+4.9
Conservative	Robert Buckland	913	3.9	−10.9
Monster Raving Loony	Screaming Lord Sutch	506	2.2	+0.9
UKIP	Hugh Hughes	289	1.2	N/A
Natural Law	Trevor Rees	47	0.2	N/A
Majority		13,097	56.5	−3.0
Turnout		23,166	45.1	−36.3
Registered electors		50,971		
Labour hold		Swing	-2.90	

== See also ==
- Lists of United Kingdom by-elections
