= Penarth Times =

Weekly newspaper

- Type: Weekly newspaper
- Format: Tabloid
- Owner: Newsquest
- Language: English
- Circulation: 1,276 (as of 2023)
- Website: penarthtimes.co.uk

The Penarth Times is a weekly newspaper serving the town of Penarth in South Wales. The paper focuses on local stories of interest, with local advertisements, announcements and letters. It is released in tabloid form every Thursday, but is sold through the week in local shops.
