= Policy Review (Labour Party) =

British political review undertaken in 1987

The Policy Review was a wide-ranging study by the British Labour Party. It was appointed to formulate popular policies in the aftermath of Labour's third successive electoral defeat in 1987.

On 14 September 1987, the chairman of Labour's home policy committee, Tom Sawyer, put forward the Policy Review plan in a paper, after consultation with Labour's leader, Neil Kinnock. Sawyer's paper included recommendations on how Labour could win back the skilled working class and it reviewed Labour's policies on enterprise, wealth creation, taxation and social security. The home policy committee voted overwhelmingly in favour of Sawyer's three-year plan to produce a new statement of Labour's policies by 1990. The Labour Party's annual conference voted to endorse the Policy Review on 28 September.

However, MPs on the left of the Labour Party criticised the Policy Review. At the home police committee meeting that endorsed the Review, Tony Benn unsuccessfully put forward an alternative paper titled The Aims and Objectives of the Labour Party. This included proposals for leaving NATO, ending nuclear power, abolition of the House of Lords, the democratisation of the magistracy and the introduction of assessors into the High Court to supervise judges. The paper also stated that Labour should support everyone's right to follow their own conscience, even if this involved breaking the law. Benn said: "There is a real risk that if we are seen to be abandoning our faith, in the search for media approval, we could be seen as a purely opportunistic party that is prepared to say anything to get into office and is ready to sacrifice good policies when the opinion polls swing against us". At a socialist conference held in Benn's constituency of Chesterfield on 24/25 October, left-wing Labour figures such as Arthur Scargill, Ken Livingstone and Eric Heffer attacked the Policy Review. Scargill said Labour's new realism was "class collaboration" that offered "palliatives not revolutionary change".

The first stage of the Policy Review reported on 25 May 1988, with seven policy reports that contained 40,000 words. Policies traditionally supported by the Labour Left (such as withdrawal from the European Community and nationalisation) were dropped, as were very high income tax rates for top earners. On 5 June, Kinnock said for the first time that Labour would not unilaterally abolish Britain's nuclear weapons but would use Trident as a bargaining chip to achieve multilateral nuclear disarmament.

In opposition to the direction Kinnock was leading the party, Benn launched an eight-month campaign for the position of Labour leader in 1988. On 2 October, Kinnock won with 88.6% of the vote and his victory was interpreted as an endorsement of the Policy Review. On the day after Kinnock's victory, the Labour Party's conference endorsed the Policy Review by a margin of 5 to 1.

On 9 May 1989, Labour's National Executive Committee voted to endorse the defence policy review by 17 votes to 8. This committed Labour to multilateral nuclear disarmament. At the Labour Party conference in October 1989, the Policy Review documents were endorsed by large majorities.
