= Islwyn (UK Parliament constituency) =

UK Parliament constituency (1983–2024)

Coordinates: 51.653°N 3.190°W

- Former county constituency for the House of Commons
- Boundary of Islwyn in Wales
- Preserved county: Gwent
- Electorate: 54,792 (December 2010)
- Major settlements: Blackwood, Risca, Pontllanfraith, Newbridge

1983–2024
- Seats: One
- Created from: Bedwellty and Abertillery
- Replaced by: Blaenau Gwent and Rhymney; Caerphilly; Newport West and Islwyn
- Senedd: Islwyn, South Wales East

Islwyn (Welsh pronunciation: [ˈɪslʊɨn]) was a constituency in Wales represented in the House of Commons of the Parliament of the United Kingdom. The area, historically known for coal-mining, had voted for Labour Party candidates since it was created effective at the 1983 general election. Islwyn's first Member of Parliament (MP) was Neil Kinnock, who represented it until he resigned from Parliament in 1995. Kinnock also served as Leader of the Labour Party and Leader of the Opposition from 1983 until 1992.

The constituency was abolished as part of the 2023 review of Westminster constituencies and under the June 2023 final recommendations of the Boundary Commission for Wales for the 2024 general election. Its wards were split between Blaenau Gwent and Rhymney, Caerphilly, and Newport West and Islwyn.

== Boundaries ==
Map of boundaries 2010–2024

1983–2010: The Borough of Islwyn.

2010–2024: The Caerphilly County Borough electoral divisions of Aberbargoed, Abercarn, Argoed, Blackwood, Cefn Fforest, Crosskeys, Crumlin, Maesycwmmer, Newbridge, Pengam, Penmaen, Pontllanfraith, Risca East, Risca West, and Ynysddu.

== Members of Parliament ==
Election	Member	Party	Notes
1983	Neil Kinnock	Labour	Leader of the Labour Party & Leader of the Opposition 1983–1992
1995 by-election	Don Touhig	Labour Co-op	Junior Defence Minister
2010	Chris Evans	Labour Co-op	Latterly sat for Caerphilly
2024	Constituency abolished		

== Elections ==
=== Elections in the 1980s ===
General election 1983: Islwyn
Party	Candidate	Votes	%	±%
Labour	Neil Kinnock	23,183	59.4	N/A
SDP	David Johnson	8,803	22.5	N/A
Conservative	Michael Bevan	5,511	14.1	N/A
Plaid Cymru	William Richards	1,574	4.0	N/A
Majority		14,380	36.9	N/A
Turnout		39,071	77.7	N/A
Registered electors		50,259		
Labour win (new seat)				

General election 1987: Islwyn
Party	Candidate	Votes	%	±%
Labour	Neil Kinnock	28,901	71.3	+11.9
Conservative	John Twitchen	5,954	14.7	+0.6
SDP	Jacqui Gasson	3,746	9.2	−13.3
Plaid Cymru	William Richards	1,932	4.8	+0.8
Majority		22,947	56.6	+19.7
Turnout		40,533	80.4	+2.7
Registered electors		50,414		
Labour hold		Swing		

=== Elections in the 1990s ===
General election 1992: Islwyn
Party	Candidate	Votes	%	±%
Labour	Neil Kinnock	30,908	74.3	+3.0
Conservative	Peter Bone	6,180	14.9	+0.2
Liberal Democrats	Michael Symonds	2,352	5.7	−3.5
Plaid Cymru (Green)	Helen Mary Jones	1,606	3.9	−0.9
Monster Raving Loony	Screaming Lord Sutch	547	1.3	N/A
Majority		24,728	59.4	+2.8
Turnout		41,593	81.4	+1.0
Registered electors		51,079		
Labour hold		Swing	+1.4	

1995 Islwyn by-election
Party	Candidate	Votes	%	±%
Labour Co-op	Don Touhig	16,030	69.2	−5.1
Plaid Cymru	Jocelyn Davies	2,933	12.7	+8.8
Liberal Democrats	John Bushell	2,448	10.6	+4.9
Conservative	Robert Buckland	913	3.9	−11.0
Monster Raving Loony	Screaming Lord Sutch	506	2.2	+0.8
UKIP	Hugh Hughes	289	1.2	N/A
Natural Law	Trevor Rees	47	0.2	N/A
Majority		13,097	56.5	−2.9
Turnout		23,166	45.1	−36.3
Registered electors		50,971		
Labour Co-op hold		Swing	−2.9	

General election 1997: Islwyn
Party	Candidate	Votes	%	±%
Labour Co-op	Don Touhig	26,995	74.2	−0.1
Liberal Democrats	Christopher Worker	3,064	8.4	+2.7
Conservative	David Walters	2,864	7.9	−7.0
Plaid Cymru	Darren Jones	2,272	6.2	+2.3
Referendum	Susan Monaghan	1,209	3.3	N/A
Majority		23,391	65.8	+6.4
Turnout		36,404	72.0	−9.4
Registered electors		50,540		
Labour Co-op hold		Swing	−1.5	

=== Elections in the 2000s ===
General election 2001: Islwyn
Party	Candidate	Votes	%	±%
Labour Co-op	Don Touhig	19,505	61.5	−12.7
Liberal Democrats	Kevin Etheridge	4,196	13.2	+4.8
Plaid Cymru	Leigh Thomas	3,767	11.9	+5.7
Conservative	Phillip Howells	2,543	8.0	+0.1
Independent	Paul Taylor	1,263	4.0	N/A
Socialist Labour	Mary Millington	417	1.3	N/A
Majority		15,309	48.3	−17.5
Turnout		31,691	61.9	−10.1
Registered electors		51,230		
Labour Co-op hold		Swing	−8.7	

General election 2005: Islwyn
Party	Candidate	Votes	%	±%
Labour Co-op	Don Touhig	19,687	63.8	+2.3
Plaid Cymru	Jim Criddle	3,947	12.8	+0.9
Liberal Democrats	Lee Dillon	3,873	12.5	−0.7
Conservative	Phillip Howells	3,358	10.9	+2.9
Majority		15,740	51.0	+2.7
Turnout		30,865	61.0	−0.9
Registered electors		50,095		
Labour Co-op hold		Swing	+0.7	

=== Elections in the 2010s ===
General election 2010: Islwyn
Party	Candidate	Votes	%	±%
Labour Co-op	Chris Evans	17,069	49.2	−15.1
Conservative	Dan Thomas	4,854	14.0	+3.0
Plaid Cymru	Steffan Lewis	4,518	13.0	+0.2
Liberal Democrats	Ashgar Ali	3,597	10.4	−1.8
Independent	Dave Rees	1,495	4.3	N/A
BNP	John Voisey	1,320	3.8	N/A
UKIP	Jason Crew	936	2.7	N/A
Independent	Paul Taylor	901	2.6	N/A
Majority		12,215	35.2	−15.8
Turnout		34,690	63.3	+3.0
Registered electors		54,866		
Labour Co-op hold		Swing	−9.1	

General election 2015: Islwyn
Party	Candidate	Votes	%	±%
Labour Co-op	Chris Evans	17,336	49.0	−0.2
UKIP	Joe Smyth	6,932	19.6	+16.9
Conservative	Laura Anne Jones	5,366	15.2	+1.2
Plaid Cymru	Lyn Ackerman	3,794	10.7	−2.3
Liberal Democrats	Brendan D'Cruz	950	2.7	−7.7
Green	Peter Varley	659	1.9	N/A
Monster Raving Loony	Von Magpie Baron	213	0.6	N/A
TUSC	Josh Rawcliffe	151	0.4	N/A
Majority		10,404	29.4	−5.8
Turnout		35,401	63.6	+0.3
Registered electors		55,697		
Labour Co-op hold		Swing		

General election 2017: Islwyn
Party	Candidate	Votes	%	±%
Labour Co-op	Chris Evans	21,238	58.8	+9.8
Conservative	Dan Thomas	9,826	27.2	+12.0
Plaid Cymru	Darren Jones	2,739	7.6	−3.1
UKIP	Joe Smyth	1,605	4.4	−15.2
Liberal Democrats	Matthew Kidner	685	1.9	−0.8
Majority		11,412	31.6	+2.2
Turnout		36,093	64.2	+0.6
Registered electors		56,256		
Labour Co-op hold		Swing	−1.1	

General election 2019: Islwyn
Party	Candidate	Votes	%	±%
Labour Co-op	Chris Evans	15,356	44.7	−14.1
Conservative	Gavin Chambers	9,892	28.8	+1.6
Brexit Party	James Wells	4,834	14.1	N/A
Plaid Cymru	Zoe Hammond	2,286	6.7	−0.9
Liberal Democrats	Jo Watkins	1,313	3.8	+1.9
Green	Catherine Linstrum	669	1.9	N/A
Rejected ballots		145		
Majority		5,464	15.9	−15.7
Turnout		34,350	62.0	−2.2
Registered electors		55,423		
Labour Co-op hold		Swing	−7.9	

Of the 145 rejected ballots:

- 53 were either unmarked or it was uncertain who the vote was for.
- 92 voted for more than one candidate.

== See also ==
- Islwyn (Senedd constituency)
- List of UK Parliament constituencies in Gwent
- List of UK Parliament constituencies in Wales

Parliament of the United Kingdom
Preceded by Blaenau Gwent	Constituency represented by the leader of the opposition 1983–1992	Succeeded by Monklands East
