= Starmer shadow cabinet =

UK shadow cabinet from 2020 to 2024

Starmer Shadow Cabinet
- Shadow cabinet of the United Kingdom
- 2020–2024
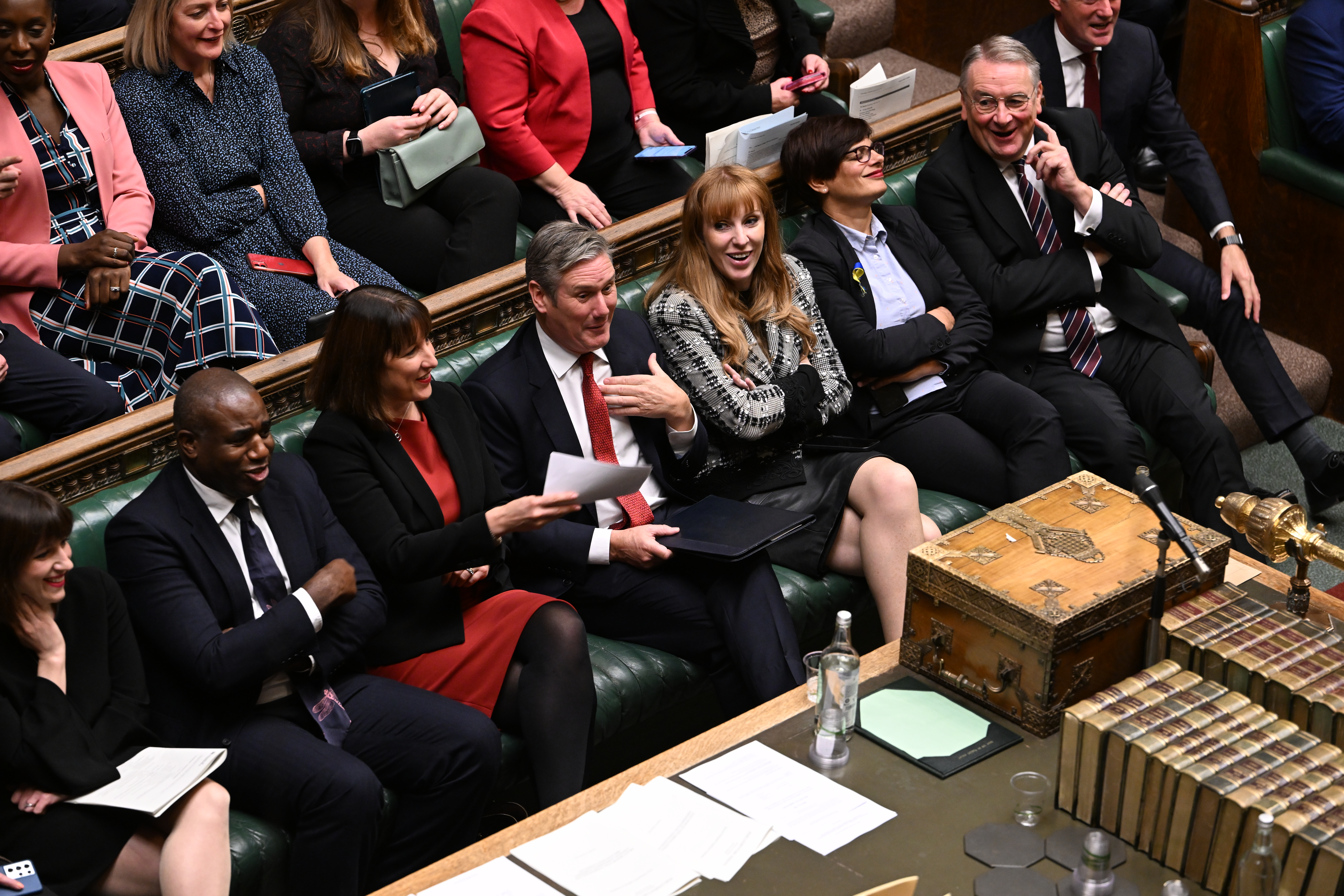
- Starmer with members of his shadow cabinet at a session of Prime Minister's Questions in 2022
- Date formed: 4 April 2020
- Date dissolved: 5 July 2024

People and organisations
- Monarch: Elizabeth II; Charles III
- Leader of the Opposition: Keir Starmer
- Shadow Deputy PM: Angela Rayner
- Member party: Labour Party
- Status in legislature: Official Opposition

History
- Incoming formation: 2020 leadership election
- Outgoing formation: 2024 general election
- Legislature terms: 2019 UK Parliament
- Predecessor: Corbyn shadow cabinet
- Successor: Sunak shadow cabinet

Keir Starmer assumed the position of Leader of the Opposition after being elected as leader of the Labour Party on 4 April 2020; the election was triggered by Jeremy Corbyn's resignation following the Labour Party's electoral defeat at the 2019 general election when Boris Johnson formed a majority Conservative government. Starmer appointed his Shadow cabinet on 5 and 6 April. He reshuffled his Shadow Cabinet five times: in June 2020, May 2021, June 2021, November 2021 and 2023.

His Shadow Cabinet appointments included MPs associated with the various wings of the party. Angela Rayner was appointed deputy labour leader and shadow deputy prime minister, while Rachel Reeves and Yvette Cooper were appointed as shadow chancellor and Shadow Home Secretary, respectively. Former Labour leader Ed Miliband was appointed shadow energy and climate secretary. Other notable appointments included David Lammy as Shadow Foreign Secretary and Wes Streeting as shadow health secretary. A reshuffle of the Shadow Cabinet was undertaken in September 2023, which was dominated by Blairites and demoted MPs on the soft left.

Following the achievement by the Labour Party of a majority in the 2024 general election, the shadow cabinet was disbanded after Starmer became Prime Minister of the United Kingdom on 5 July 2024, succeeding Rishi Sunak of the Conservative Party.

== Shadow Cabinet ==
=== April 2020 – May 2021 ===
Key
Sits in the House of Commons
Sits in the House of Lords

Official Opposition Shadow Cabinet of the United Kingdom[]
Portfolio	Shadow Minister	Constituency	Term
Shadow cabinet ministers
Leader of the Opposition; Leader of the Labour Party	Keir Starmer (Note: This member is also a Privy Counsellor)	Holborn and St Pancras	Apr 2020 – July 2024
Deputy Leader of the Opposition; Deputy Leader of the Labour Party; Shadow First Secretary of State	Angela Rayner	Ashton-under-Lyne	Apr 2020 – July 2024
Chair of the Labour Party; National Campaign Coordinator	Angela Rayner	Ashton-under-Lyne	Apr 2020 – May 2021
Shadow Chancellor of the Exchequer	Anneliese Dodds	Oxford East	Apr 2020 – May 2021
Shadow Foreign Secretary	Lisa Nandy	Wigan	Apr 2020 – Nov 2021
Shadow Home Secretary	Nick Thomas-Symonds	Torfaen	Apr 2020 – Nov 2021
Shadow Chancellor of the Duchy of Lancaster; Shadow Minister for the Cabinet Office (Note: De facto.)	Rachel Reeves	Leeds West	Apr 2020 – May 2021
Shadow Lord Chancellor; Shadow Secretary of State for Justice	David Lammy	Tottenham	Apr 2020 – Nov 2021
Shadow Secretary of State for Defence	John Healey	Wentworth and Dearne	Apr 2020 – July 2024
Shadow Secretary of State for Business, Energy and Industrial Strategy	Ed Miliband	Doncaster North	Apr 2020 – Nov 2021
Shadow Secretary of State for International Trade	Emily Thornberry	Islington South and Finsbury	Apr 2020 – Nov 2021
Shadow Secretary of State for Work and Pensions	Jonathan Reynolds	Stalybridge and Hyde	Apr 2020 – Nov 2021
Shadow Secretary of State for Health and Social Care	Jonathan Ashworth	Leicester South	Oct 2016 – Nov 2021
Shadow Secretary of State for Education	Rebecca Long-Bailey	Salford and Eccles	Apr 2020 – June 2020
Shadow Secretary of State for Education	Kate Green	Stretford and Urmston	Jun 2020 – Nov 2021
Shadow Secretary of State for Digital, Culture, Media and Sport	Jo Stevens	Cardiff Central	Apr 2020 – Nov 2021
Shadow Chief Secretary to the Treasury	Bridget Phillipson	Houghton and Sunderland South	Apr 2020 – Nov 2021
Shadow Secretary of State for Environment, Food and Rural Affairs	Luke Pollard	Plymouth Sutton and Devonport	Apr 2020 – Nov 2021
Shadow Secretary of State for Communities and Local Government	Steve Reed	Croydon North	Apr 2020 – Nov 2021
Shadow Secretary of State for Housing	Thangam Debbonaire	Bristol West	Apr 2020 – May 2021
Shadow Secretary of State for Transport	Jim McMahon	Oldham West and Royton	Apr 2020 – Nov 2021
Shadow Secretary of State for International Development	Preet Gill	Birmingham Edgbaston	Apr 2020 – Sep 2023
Shadow Secretary of State for Northern Ireland	Louise Haigh	Sheffield Heeley	Apr 2020 – Nov 2021
Shadow Secretary of State for Scotland	Ian Murray	Edinburgh South	Apr 2020 – July 2024
Shadow Secretary of State for Wales	Nia Griffith	Llanelli	Apr 2020 – Nov 2021
Shadow Secretary of State for Women and Equalities	Marsha de Cordova	Battersea	Apr 2020 – Sep 2021
Shadow Secretary of State for Employment Rights and Protections	Andy McDonald	Middlesbrough	Apr 2020 – Sep 2021
Shadow Minister for Mental Health	Rosena Allin-Khan	Tooting	Apr 2020 – Sep 2023
Shadow Minister for Young People and Voter Engagement	Cat Smith	Lancaster and Fleetwood	Jun 2016 – Nov 2021
Shadow Attorney General for England and Wales	Charlie Falconer	Member of the House of Lords	Apr 2020 – Nov 2021
Shadow Leader of the House of Commons	Valerie Vaz	Walsall South	Oct 2016 – May 2021
Opposition Chief Whip in the House of Commons	Nick Brown	Newcastle upon Tyne East	Oct 2016 – May 2021
Shadow Leader of the House of Lords	Angela Smith	Member of the House of Lords	May 2015 – July 2024
Opposition Chief Whip in the House of Lords	Tommy McAvoy	Member of the House of Lords	Jan 2018 – Jun 2021

=== May 2021 – November 2021 ===
Key
Sits in the House of Commons
Sits in the House of Lords

Official Opposition Shadow Cabinet of the United Kingdom []
Portfolio	Shadow Minister	Constituency	Term
Shadow cabinet ministers
Leader of the Opposition; Leader of the Labour Party	Keir Starmer	Holborn and St Pancras	Apr 2020 – July 2024
Deputy Leader of the Opposition; Deputy Leader of the Labour Party; Shadow First Secretary of State	Angela Rayner	Ashton-under-Lyne	Apr 2020 – July 2024
Shadow Chancellor of the Duchy of Lancaster; Shadow Minister for the Cabinet Office; Shadow Secretary of State for the Future of Work	Angela Rayner	Ashton-under-Lyne	May 2021 – Sep 2023
Shadow Chancellor of the Exchequer	Rachel Reeves	Leeds West	May 2021 – July 2024
Shadow Foreign Secretary	Lisa Nandy	Wigan	Apr 2020 – Nov 2021
Shadow Home Secretary	Nick Thomas-Symonds	Torfaen	Apr 2020 – Nov 2021
Shadow Lord Chancellor; Shadow Secretary of State for Justice	David Lammy	Tottenham	Apr 2020 – Nov 2021
Shadow Secretary of State for Defence	John Healey	Wentworth and Dearne	Apr 2020 – July 2024
Shadow Secretary of State for Business, Energy and Industrial Strategy	Ed Miliband	Doncaster North	Apr 2020 – Nov 2021
Shadow Secretary of State for International Trade	Emily Thornberry	Islington South and Finsbury	Apr 2020 – Nov 2021
Shadow Secretary of State for Work and Pensions	Jonathan Reynolds	Stalybridge and Hyde	Apr 2020 – Nov 2021
Shadow Secretary of State for Health and Social Care	Jonathan Ashworth	Leicester South	Oct 2016 – Nov 2021
Shadow Secretary of State for Education	Kate Green	Stretford and Urmston	Jun 2020 – Nov 2021
Shadow Secretary of State for Digital, Culture, Media and Sport	Jo Stevens	Cardiff Central	Apr 2020 – Nov 2021
Shadow Secretary of State for Environment, Food and Rural Affairs	Luke Pollard	Plymouth Sutton and Devonport	Apr 2020 – Nov 2021
Shadow Secretary of State for Communities and Local Government	Steve Reed	Croydon North	Apr 2020 – Nov 2021
Shadow Secretary of State for Housing	Lucy Powell	Manchester Central	May 2021 – Nov 2021
Shadow Secretary of State for Transport	Jim McMahon	Oldham West and Royton	Apr 2020 – Nov 2021
Shadow Secretary of State for International Development	Preet Gill	Birmingham Edgbaston	Apr 2020 – Sep 2023
Shadow Secretary of State for Northern Ireland	Louise Haigh	Sheffield Heeley	Apr 2020 – Nov 2021
Shadow Secretary of State for Scotland	Ian Murray	Edinburgh South	Apr 2020 – July 2024
Shadow Secretary of State for Wales	Nia Griffith	Llanelli	Apr 2020 – Nov 2021
Shadow Secretary of State for Women and Equalities	Marsha de Cordova	Battersea	Apr 2020 – Sep 2021
Shadow Secretary of State for Women and Equalities	Anneliese Dodds	Oxford East	Sept 2021 – July 2024
Chair of the Labour Party	Anneliese Dodds	Oxford East	May 2021 – July 2024
Shadow Secretary of State for Employment Rights and Protections	Andy McDonald	Middlesbrough	Apr 2020 – Sep 2021
Shadow Secretary of State for Mental Health	Rosena Allin-Khan	Tooting	Apr 2020 – Sep 2023
Shadow Secretary of State for Young People and Democracy	Cat Smith	Lancaster and Fleetwood	Jun 2016 – Nov 2021
Shadow Secretary of State for Child Poverty	Wes Streeting	Ilford North	May 2021 – Nov 2021
Shadow Minister of State at the Cabinet Office	Jenny Chapman	Member of the House of Lords	Jun 2021 – July 2024
Shadow Chief Secretary to the Treasury	Bridget Phillipson	Houghton and Sunderland South	Apr 2020 – Nov 2021
Labour Party National Campaign Coordinator	Shabana Mahmood	Birmingham Ladywood	May 2021 – Sep 2023
Shadow Attorney General for England and Wales	Charlie Falconer	Member of the House of Lords	Apr 2020 – Nov 2021
Shadow Leader of the House of Commons	Thangam Debbonaire	Bristol West	May 2021 – Sep 2023
Opposition Chief Whip in the House of Commons	Alan Campbell	Tynemouth	May 2021 – July 2024
Shadow Leader of the House of Lords	Angela Smith	Member of the House of Lords	May 2015 – July 2024
Opposition Chief Whip in the House of Lords	Roy Kennedy	Member of the House of Lords	Jun 2021 – July 2024

=== November 2021 – September 2023 ===
Key
Sits in the House of Commons
Sits in the House of Lords

Official Opposition Shadow Cabinet of the United Kingdom
Portfolio	Shadow Minister	Constituency	Term
Shadow cabinet ministers
Leader of the Opposition; Leader of the Labour Party	Keir Starmer (Note: This member is also a Privy Counsellor)	Holborn and St Pancras	Apr 2020 – July 2024
Deputy Leader of the Opposition; Deputy Leader of the Labour Party; Shadow First Secretary of State	Angela Rayner	Ashton-under-Lyne	Apr 2020 – July 2024
Shadow Chancellor of the Duchy of Lancaster; Shadow Minister for the Cabinet Office; Shadow Secretary of State for the Future of Work	Angela Rayner	Ashton-under-Lyne	May 2021 – Sep 2023
Shadow Chancellor of the Exchequer	Rachel Reeves	Leeds West	May 2021 – July 2024
Shadow Secretary of State for Foreign, Commonwealth and Development Affairs	David Lammy	Tottenham	Nov 2021 – July 2024
Shadow Secretary of State for the Home Department	Yvette Cooper	Normanton, Pontefract and Castleford	Nov 2021 – July 2024
Shadow Lord Chancellor; Shadow Secretary of State for Justice	Steve Reed	Croydon North	Nov 2021 – Sep 2023
Shadow Secretary of State for Defence	John Healey	Wentworth and Dearne	Apr 2020 – July 2024
Shadow Secretary of State for Climate Change and Net Zero	Ed Miliband	Doncaster North	Nov 2021 – July 2024
Shadow Secretary of State for Business and Industrial Strategy	Jonathan Reynolds	Stalybridge and Hyde	Nov 2021 – July 2024
Shadow Secretary of State for International Trade	Nick Thomas-Symonds	Torfaen	Nov 2021 – Sep 2023
Shadow Secretary of State for Work and Pensions	Jonathan Ashworth	Leicester South	Nov 2021 – Sep 2023
Shadow Secretary of State for Health and Social Care	Wes Streeting	Ilford North	Nov 2021 – July 2024
Shadow Secretary of State for Education	Bridget Phillipson	Houghton and Sunderland South	Nov 2021 – July 2024
Shadow Secretary of State for Digital, Culture, Media and Sport	Lucy Powell	Manchester Central	Nov 2021 – Sep 2023
Shadow Secretary of State for Environment, Food and Rural Affairs	Jim McMahon	Oldham West and Royton	Nov 2021 – Sep 2023
Shadow Secretary of State for Levelling Up, Housing and Communities	Lisa Nandy	Wigan	Nov 2021 – Sep 2023
Shadow Secretary of State for Transport	Louise Haigh	Sheffield Heeley	Nov 2021 – July 2024
Shadow Secretary of State for Northern Ireland	Peter Kyle	Hove	Nov 2021 – Sep 2023
Shadow Secretary of State for Scotland	Ian Murray	Edinburgh South	Apr 2020 – July 2024
Shadow Secretary of State for Wales	Jo Stevens	Cardiff Central	Nov 2021 – July 2024
Shadow Secretary of State for Women and Equalities	Anneliese Dodds	Oxford East	Sept 2021 – July 2024
Chair of the Labour Party	Anneliese Dodds	Oxford East	May 2021 – July 2024
Shadow Minister of State at the Cabinet Office	Baroness Chapman of Darlington	Member of the House of Lords	Jun 2021 – July 2024
Shadow Chief Secretary to the Treasury	Pat McFadden	Wolverhampton South East	Nov 2021 – Sep 2023
Shadow Cabinet Minister for International Development	Preet Gill	Birmingham Edgbaston	Apr 2020 – Sep 2023
Shadow Cabinet Minister for Mental Health	Rosena Allin-Khan	Tooting	Apr 2020 – Sep 2023
Labour Party National Campaign Coordinator	Shabana Mahmood	Birmingham Ladywood	May 2021 – Sep 2023
Shadow Attorney General for England and Wales	Emily Thornberry	Islington South and Finsbury	Nov 2021 – July 2024
Shadow Leader of the House of Commons	Thangam Debbonaire	Bristol West	May 2021 – Sep 2023
Opposition Chief Whip in the House of Commons	Alan Campbell	Tynemouth	May 2021 – July 2024
Shadow Leader of the House of Lords	Baroness Smith of Basildon	Member of the House of Lords	May 2015 – July 2024
Opposition Chief Whip in the House of Lords	Lord Kennedy of Southwark	Member of the House of Lords	Jun 2021 – July 2024

=== September 2023 – July 2024 ===
Portfolio	Shadow Minister	Constituency	Term
Shadow cabinet ministers
Leader of the Opposition; Leader of the Labour Party	Keir Starmer	Holborn and St Pancras	Apr 2020 – July 2024
Deputy Leader of the Opposition; Deputy Leader of the Labour Party	Angela Rayner	Ashton-under-Lyne	Apr 2020 – July 2024
Shadow Deputy Prime Minister of the United Kingdom; Shadow Secretary of State for Levelling Up, Housing and Communities	Angela Rayner	Ashton-under-Lyne	Sep 2023 – July 2024
Shadow Chancellor of the Exchequer	Rachel Reeves	Leeds West	May 2021 – July 2024
Shadow Secretary of State for Foreign, Commonwealth and Development Affairs	David Lammy	Tottenham	Nov 2021 – July 2024
Shadow Secretary of State for the Home Department	Yvette Cooper	Normanton, Pontefract and Castleford	Nov 2021 – July 2024
Shadow Chancellor of the Duchy of Lancaster; Labour Party National Campaign Co-ordinator	Pat McFadden	Wolverhampton South East	Sep 2023 – July 2024
Shadow Lord Chancellor; Shadow Secretary of State for Justice	Shabana Mahmood	Birmingham Ladywood	Sep 2023 – July 2024
Shadow Secretary of State for Defence	John Healey	Wentworth and Dearne	Apr 2020 – July 2024
Shadow Secretary of State for Science, Innovation and Technology	Peter Kyle	Hove	Sep 2023 – July 2024
Shadow Secretary of State for Energy Security and Net Zero	Ed Miliband	Doncaster North	Nov 2021 – July 2024
Shadow Secretary of State for Business and Trade	Jonathan Reynolds	Stalybridge and Hyde	Sep 2023 – July 2024
Shadow Secretary of State for Work and Pensions	Liz Kendall	Leicester West	Sep 2023 – July 2024
Shadow Secretary of State for Health and Social Care	Wes Streeting	Ilford North	Nov 2021 – July 2024
Shadow Secretary of State for Education	Bridget Phillipson	Houghton and Sunderland South	Nov 2021 – July 2024
Shadow Secretary of State for Culture, Media and Sport	Thangam Debbonaire	Bristol West	Sep 2023 – July 2024
Shadow Secretary of State for Environment, Food and Rural Affairs	Steve Reed	Croydon North	Sep 2023 – July 2024
Shadow Secretary of State for Transport	Louise Haigh	Sheffield Heeley	Nov 2021 – July 2024
Shadow Secretary of State for Northern Ireland	Hilary Benn	Leeds Central	Sep 2023 – July 2024
Shadow Secretary of State for Scotland	Ian Murray	Edinburgh South	Apr 2020 – July 2024
Shadow Secretary of State for Wales	Jo Stevens	Cardiff Central	Nov 2021 – July 2024
Shadow Secretary of State for Women and Equalities	Anneliese Dodds	Oxford East	Sept 2021 – July 2024
Chair of the Labour Party	Anneliese Dodds	Oxford East	May 2021 – July 2024
Shadow Minister without Portfolio	Nick Thomas-Symonds	Torfaen	Sep 2023 – July 2024
Shadow Chief Secretary to the Treasury	Darren Jones	Bristol North West	Sep 2023 – July 2024
Shadow Cabinet Minister for International Development	Lisa Nandy	Wigan	Sep 2023 – July 2024
Shadow Paymaster General	Jonathan Ashworth	Leicester South	Sep 2023 – July 2024
Shadow Attorney General for England and Wales	Emily Thornberry	Islington South and Finsbury	Nov 2021 – July 2024
Deputy National Campaign Coordinator	Ellie Reeves	Lewisham West and Penge	Sep 2023 – July 2024
Shadow Leader of the House of Commons	Lucy Powell	Manchester Central	Sep 2023 – July 2024
Opposition Chief Whip in the House of Commons	Alan Campbell	Tynemouth	May 2021 – July 2024
Shadow Leader of the House of Lords	Baroness Smith of Basildon	Member of the House of Lords	May 2015 – July 2024
Opposition Chief Whip in the House of Lords	Lord Kennedy of Southwark	Member of the House of Lords	Jun 2021 – July 2024

== Shadow Ministers by department ==
In April 2020, Starmer's shadow cabinet was appointed over the course of the week following the leadership election, which included former leader Ed Miliband, as well as both of the candidates he defeated in the contest. He also appointed Anneliese Dodds as Shadow Chancellor of the Exchequer, making her the first woman to serve in that position in either a ministerial or shadow ministerial capacity.

On 25 June 2020, Starmer dismissed his former leadership rival Rebecca Long-Bailey from her post as Shadow Secretary of State for Education. Long-Bailey had refused to delete a tweet calling the actress Maxine Peake an "absolute diamond" and linking to an interview in The Independent in which Peake said that the practice of kneeling on someone's neck by US police, as used in the murder of George Floyd in Minneapolis, was "learnt from seminars with Israeli secret services". The original article stated that "the Israeli police has denied this." Starmer said that because the article "contained anti-Semitic conspiracy theories" it should not have been shared by Long-Bailey. The decision to dismiss Long-Bailey was criticised by the Socialist Campaign Group, whose members met with Starmer about the decision. The decision was welcomed by some Jewish groups including the Board of Deputies and the Jewish Labour Movement. Starmer said that "restoring trust with the Jewish community is a number one priority. Antisemitism takes many different forms and it is important that we all are vigilant against it." On 27 June, he replaced her with Kate Green.

On 23 September 2020, three frontbenchers (Olivia Blake, Nadia Whittome, and Beth Winter) rebelled against Labour's position of abstention on the Overseas Operations (Service Personnel and Veterans) Bill and voted against the bill; all three lost their frontbench roles over the issue. This move was seen as an indication of the firm discipline Starmer intended to exert over his party.

In the third reading of the Covert Human Intelligence Sources (Criminal Conduct) Bill on 15 October 2020, the Labour Party stance was to abstain yet 34 Labour MPs rebelled, including shadow ministers Dan Carden and Margaret Greenwood, and five parliamentary private secretaries who all resigned from their frontbench roles. These 34 were penalised the next day by being put on probation for going against the one-line whip to abstain.

In April 2023, after writing an article in The Observer, former Shadow Home Secretary Diane Abbott was suspended as a Labour MP pending an investigation. In the article, Abbott claimed that although "many types of white people with points of difference" such as Jewish, Irish or Traveller people can experience prejudice, they are not subject to racism "all their lives". Abbott later apologised for the article, saying that she had erroneously sent an early draft of her article. A Labour Party statement said that the comments were "deeply offensive and wrong". Starmer said that she was suspended due to anti-Semitism.

Emily Thornberry expressed her disappointment at not being appointed to a senior ministerial position by Sir Keir Starmer, despite her extensive tenure as shadow attorney general. She emphasised her contributions to Labour's policies and committed to supporting Starmer's government despite her personal setback.

== Reshuffles ==
=== May 2021 Shadow Cabinet reshuffle ===
In the aftermath of relatively poor results in the 2021 local elections, Starmer carried out a May 2021 shadow cabinet reshuffle. Starmer dismissed Angela Rayner as Chair of the Labour Party and National Campaign Coordinator following the elections. The move was criticised by John McDonnell, former Shadow Chancellor of the Exchequer, and Andy Burnham, Mayor of Greater Manchester. The major outcome of the reshuffle was the demotion of the Shadow Chancellor, Anneliese Dodds. Rachel Reeves was appointed as the new Shadow Chancellor and Angela Rayner succeeded Reeves as Shadow Chancellor of the Duchy of Lancaster. Nick Brown was dismissed as Chief Whip and replaced by his deputy, Alan Campbell. Valerie Vaz departed as Shadow Leader of the House of Commons and was replaced by Thangam Debbonaire, who in turn was succeeded as Shadow Secretary of State for Housing by Lucy Powell. On 11 May 2021, Starmer's Parliamentary Private Secretary (PPS) Carolyn Harris resigned, which The Times reported was after allegedly spreading false rumours about the private life of Angela Rayner prior to her dismissal. Sharon Hodgson was appointed as Starmer's new PPS.

=== November 2021 Shadow Cabinet reshuffle ===
The November 2021 shadow cabinet reshuffle, which was considered a surprise, included the promotion of Yvette Cooper and David Lammy to Shadow Home Secretary and Shadow Foreign Secretary, respectively, while Miliband was moved from Shadow Secretary of State for Business and Industrial Strategy to Shadow Secretary of State for Climate Change and Net Zero. The appointment of Cooper in particular was described by some commentators as a sign of Labour further splitting from the Corbyn leadership and moving to the right. The BBC's Laura Kuenssberg and Robert Peston of ITV News said that the reshuffle aimed to "combine experience and youth" and end "the fatuous project of trying to ... placate Labour's warring factions", and instead chose "shadow ministers for their perceived ability". In the New Statesman, journalist Stephen Bush suggested that Starmer had "removed underperforming shadow cabinet ministers and rewarded his biggest hitters – but the resulting shadow cabinet looks to be less than the sum of its parts."

=== 2023 ===
In September 2023, Starmer reshuffled his shadow cabinet for the third time since taking over as leader. Writers from The Guardian and Politico said that the Blairite wing of the party had prospered in the reshuffle to the detriment of the soft left of the party. One shadow minister, said of the reshuffle, "It's all the Blairites" and called it "an entirely factional takeover". Starmer said that he was putting his "strongest possible players on the pitch" ahead of the upcoming general election. Tom Belger writing for LabourList described the reshuffle as a continuing of "Labour's right-ward march".

Starmer's deputy Angela Rayner received the shadow levelling up post, replacing Lisa Nandy who was demoted to the shadow minister for international development. The most senior members of the shadow cabinet remained in their positions. Rosena Allin-Khan, who was the shadow minister for mental health before the reshuffle, resigned from the Shadow Cabinet, criticising shadow Health Secretary Wes Streeting's advocacy for outsourcing the NHS to the private sector. She also said that Starmer did "not see a space for a mental health portfolio in a Labour cabinet". The reshuffle coincided with the start of the tenure of Sue Gray as Starmer's new chief of staff.
