= Shadow Minister of State at the Cabinet Office =

Position in the British Shadow Cabinet

Shadow Minister of State for the Cabinet Office
- Incumbent; Baroness Finn since 11 November 2024
- Shadow Cabinet
- Status: Abolished
- Appointer: Leader of the Opposition
- First holder: Baroness Chapman of Darlington
- Website: The Labour Party

The Shadow Minister of State for the Cabinet Office was a position in the British Shadow Cabinet, appointed by the Leader of the Opposition. The post was made to shadow the Cabinet Office in the Lords, particularly Minister of State for the Cabinet Office Lord Frost who is also Chief Negotiator of Task Force Europe. The position is also Shadow Minister for EU Relations and the opposite to Frost. It is also the Opposition Cabinet Spokesperson in the Lords. The position was held by Baroness Chapman of Darlington. She was appointed to the role in June 2021 by Keir Starmer.

== Shadow Minister of State for the Cabinet Office ==
Name	Portrait	Term of office		Party	Leader
Baroness Chapman of Darlington		22 June 2021	5 July 2024	Labour	Keir Starmer
Baroness Neville-Rolfe		1 September 2024	10 November 2024	Conservative	Rishi Sunak
Baroness Finn		11 November 2024	Incumbent	Conservative	Kemi Badenoch

== See also ==
- Shadow Cabinet of Keir Starmer
- Shadow Minister for the Cabinet Office
