= 2023 British shadow cabinet reshuffle =

UK shadow cabinet reshuffle

On 4 September 2023, Keir Starmer, Leader of the UK Labour Party and Leader of the Opposition, carried out a reshuffle of his shadow cabinet. This was his third major reshuffle and was described as promoting his loyalists to senior roles.

Starmer's deputy Angela Rayner received the shadow levelling up post, replacing Lisa Nandy who was demoted to the shadow minister for international development. The most senior members of the shadow cabinet remained in their positions. Rosena Allin-Khan, who was the shadow minister for mental health before the reshuffle, resigned from the Shadow Cabinet, criticising shadow Health Secretary Wes Streeting's advocacy for outsourcing the NHS to the private sector. She also said that Starmer did "not see a space for a mental health portfolio in a Labour cabinet". The reshuffle coincided with the start of the tenure of Sue Gray as Starmer's new chief of staff.

Writers from The Guardian and Politico said that the Blairite wing of the party had prospered in the reshuffle to the detriment of the soft left of the party. One shadow minister, said of the reshuffle, "It's all the Blairites" and called it "an entirely factional takeover". Starmer said that he was putting his "strongest possible players on the pitch" ahead of the upcoming general election. Tom Belger writing for LabourList described the reshuffle as a continuing of "Labour's right-ward march".

== Background ==
The last shadow cabinet reshuffle was carried out in November 2021. Since then the Labour Party has performed strongly in opinion polls in the lead up to the 2024 general election. Labour gains in the by-elections in Wakefield and Selby and Ainsty consolidated their electoral performance as did the 2022 local elections. In August 2023, it was speculated in the media that Deputy Leader of the Labour Party Angela Rayner could have her responsibilities changed. It was reported that most "big guns" were considered to be safe. The reshuffle coincided with the appointment of Sue Gray as Chief of Staff to Keir Starmer.

== Changes ==
Sue Gray took a leading role in the reshuffle. It included the promotion of Blairites Hilary Benn and Pat McFadden who served under Tony Blair and Gordon Brown. Lisa Nandy lost her role as Shadow Secretary of State for Levelling Up, Housing and Communities to become a shadow foreign office minister, the Shadow Overseas Development Minister, which was described by Sam Coates as "unambiguously a demotion". Labour have stated their intention to reinstate the Department for International Development if they win office. Fellow Greater Manchester MP Angela Rayner became the new shadow levelling up secretary and was also given the new role of Shadow Deputy Prime Minister of the United Kingdom. This consolidated her role in any future Labour government. Gray was involved in negotiations with Rayner over her position.

Hilary Benn returned to the Shadow Cabinet as Shadow Secretary of State for Northern Ireland, for the first time since he resigned as Shadow Foreign Secretary in 2016 under Jeremy Corbyn. Gray is believed to have been involved in this appointment as well. Jim McMahon resigned as Shadow Secretary of State for Environment, Food and Rural Affairs, citing ill health, and returned to the backbenches.

Rosena Allin-Khan resigned from the Shadow Cabinet, criticising Shadow Health Secretary Wes Streeting's advocacy for outsourcing the National Health Service (NHS) to the private sector. She also said that Starmer did "not see a space for a mental health portfolio in a Labour cabinet".

== Reaction ==
John Rentoul wrote in The Independent that Starmer delaying the reshuffle was to avoid a revolt from the left wing of the party. The promotion of Andrew Gwynne, a former ally of Jeremy Corbyn from the left of the party, was seen as Starmer extending an olive branch to the party's left wing.

Both Momentum and Compass accused Starmer of promoting a "narrow band of Blairites". Starmer was described as demoting figures from the soft left of the party and promoting in their place his loyalists as well as Blairites. While there were leading figures on the soft left who remained in the shadow cabinet, such as Ed Miliband, Louise Haigh and Angela Rayner, the faction was thought to have lost most of its influence. Owen Jones criticised the amount of Blairites in the new shadow cabinet. Andrew Fisher who was Director of Policy of the Labour Party, under leader Jeremy Corbyn described Starmer as a "weak leader" surrounded by yes men. A shadow minister described the reshuffle as a factional takeover and described it as "all the Blairites" and a "shoring up of the right of the party". Likewise, editor at LabourList, Tom Belger, wrote of the reshuffle, "More Blairites than Blair" and quoted an MP that stated "even Blair didn't have this many Blairites in his cabinet". Belger also stated that the reshuffle signified that "Labour's right-ward march continues".

== Cabinet-level changes ==
Colour key
- Joined the Shadow Cabinet
- Left the Shadow Cabinet
- Portfolio created/renamed

Minister	Position(s) before reshuffle	Position(s) after reshuffle
Jim McMahon MP	Shadow Secretary of State for Environment, Food and Rural Affairs	Backbench MP – Resigned for health reasons
Lisa Nandy MP	Shadow Secretary of State for Levelling Up, Housing and Communities	Shadow Cabinet Minister for International Development
Angela Rayner MP	Shadow First Secretary of State; Deputy Leader of the Labour Party; Shadow Chancellor of the Duchy of Lancaster; Shadow Secretary of State for the Future of Work	Shadow Deputy Prime Minister; Deputy Leader of the Labour Party (Note: Elected office so role cannot be removed); Shadow Secretary of State for Levelling Up, Housing and Communities; Strategic Lead for Labour's New Deal
Shabana Mahmood MP	Labour Party National Campaign Coordinator	Shadow Secretary of State for Justice
Steve Reed MP	Shadow Secretary of State for Justice; Shadow Lord Chancellor	Shadow Secretary of State for Environment, Food and Rural Affairs
Pat McFadden MP	Shadow Chief Secretary to the Treasury	Shadow Chancellor of the Duchy of Lancaster; Labour Party National Campaign Coordinator
Liz Kendall MP	Shadow Minister for Social Care	Shadow Secretary of State for Work and Pensions
Jonathan Ashworth MP	Shadow Secretary of State for Work and Pensions	Shadow Paymaster General
Thangam Debbonaire MP	Shadow Leader of the House of Commons	Shadow Secretary of State for Culture, Media and Sport
Peter Kyle MP	Shadow Secretary of State for Northern Ireland	Shadow Secretary of State for Science, Innovation and Technology
Darren Jones MP	Chair of the Business and Trade Select Committee	Shadow Chief Secretary to the Treasury
Nick Thomas-Symonds MP	Shadow President of the Board of Trade; Shadow Secretary of State for International Trade	Shadow Minister without Portfolio in the Cabinet Office
Hilary Benn MP	Backbench MP	Shadow Secretary of State for Northern Ireland
Lucy Powell MP	Shadow Secretary of State for Digital, Culture, Media and Sport	Shadow Leader of the House of Commons
Rosena Allin-Khan MP	Shadow Cabinet Minister for Mental Health	Backbench MP – Resigned over policy differences
Preet Gill MP	Shadow Cabinet Minister for International Development	Shadow Minister for Primary Care and Public Health
Ellie Reeves MP	Shadow Minister for Prisons and Probation	Labour Party Deputy National Campaign Coordinator

== Junior changes ==
These roles were left vacant following the cabinet-level changes:

- Chair of the Business and Trade Select Committee

On 5 and 6 September, a number of junior changes were announced:

Minister	Position(s) before reshuffle	Position(s) after reshuffle
Stephen Morgan MP	Shadow Schools Minister	Shadow Minister for Rail
Catherine McKinnell MP	Chair of the Petitions Committee	Shadow Schools Minister
Abena Oppong-Asare MP	Shadow Exchequer Secretary to the Treasury	Shadow Minister Women's Health and Mental Health
Alex Norris MP	Shadow Minister for Levelling Up	Shadow Minister for Policing
Sarah Jones MP	Shadow Minister for Policing and the Fire Service	Shadow Minister for Industry and Decarbonisation (new role)
Dan Jarvis MP	Backbench MP	Shadow Minister for Security
Holly Lynch MP	Shadow Minister for Security	Opposition Deputy Chief Whip in the House of Commons (Legislation)
Seema Malhotra MP	Shadow Minister for Small Business, Consumers and Labour Markets	Shadow Minister for Skills
Chris Bryant MP	Chair of the Commons Committee on Standards	Shadow Minister for Creative Industries and Digital
Tanmanjeet Singh Dhesi MP	Shadow Minister for Rail	Shadow Exchequer Secretary to the Treasury
Andrew Gwynne MP	Shadow Minister for Public Health	Shadow Minister for Social Care
Jessica Morden MP	Parliamentary Private Secretary to the Leader of the Opposition and Shadow Deputy Leader of the House of Commons	Shadow Minister for Wales and Parliamentary Private Secretary to the Leader of the Opposition
Rushanara Ali MP	Backbench MP	Shadow Minister for Investment and Small Business
Karin Smyth MP	Backbench MP	Shadow Minister for Health
Fleur Anderson MP	Shadow Paymaster General	Shadow Minister for Northern Ireland
Justin Madders MP	Shadow Minister for Employment Rights and Protection	Shadow Minister for Business, Employment Rights and Levelling Up
Gareth Thomas MP	Shadow Minister for International Trade	Shadow Minister for Trade
Afzal Khan MP	Shadow Minister for Legal Aid	Shadow Minister for Exports
Alan Whitehead MP	Shadow Minister for Green New Deal and Energy	Shadow Minister for Energy Security
Jeff Smith MP	Shadow Minister for Sport, Tourism, Heritage and Music	Shadow Minister for Clean Power and Consumers
Stephanie Peacock MP	Shadow Minister for Media, Data and Digital Infrastructure	Shadow Minister for Sport, Gambling and Media
Lilian Greenwood MP	Opposition Deputy Chief Whip in the House of Commons	Shadow Minister for Arts, Heritage and Civil Society
Barbara Keeley MP	Shadow Minister for Arts and Civil Society	Shadow Minister for Music and Tourism
Toby Perkins MP	Shadow Minister for Apprenticeships and Lifelong Learning	Shadow Minister for Rural Affairs
Emma Hardy MP	Backbench MP	Shadow Minister for Environmental Quality and Resilience
Anna McMorrin MP	Shadow Minister for Victims and Youth Justice	Shadow Minister for Latin America and the Caribbean
Feryal Clark MP	Shadow Minister for Primary Care and Patient Safety	Shadow Minister for Health
Nick Smith MP	Backbench MP	Shadow Deputy Leader of the House of Commons
Florence Eshalomi MP	Shadow Parliamentary Secretary to the Cabinet Office	Shadow Minister for Democracy
Paula Barker MP	Shadow Minister for Homelessness and Rough Sleeping	Shadow Minister for Devolution and the English Regions
Mike Amesbury MP	Backbench MP	Shadow Minister for Building Safety and Homelessness
Imran Hussain MP	Shadow Minister for Work	Shadow Minister for the New Deal for Working People
Maria Eagle MP	Backbench MP	Shadow Minister for Procurement
Janet Daby MP	Backbench MP	Shadow Minister for Youth Justice
Kevin Brennan MP	Backbench MP	Shadow Minister for Victims and Sentencing
Ruth Cadbury MP	Shadow Minister for International Trade	Shadow Minister for Prisons, Parole and Probation
Alex Davies-Jones MP	Shadow Minister for Tech, Gambling and Digital Economy	Shadow Minister for Tech and Digital Economy
Matt Rodda MP	Shadow Minister for Pensions	Shadow Minister for AI and Intellectual Property
Gerald Jones MP	Shadow Minister for Wales	Shadow Minister for Scotland
Bill Esterson MP	Shadow Minister for Business and Industry	Shadow Minister for Roads
Simon Lightwood MP	Shadow Minister for Buses and Taxis	Shadow Minister for Local Transport
Chris Evans MP	Shadow Minister for Defence Procurement	Shadow Minister for Social Security
Gill Furniss MP	Shadow Minister for Roads	Shadow Minister for Pensions
Mark Tami MP	Opposition Pairing Whip	Opposition Deputy Chief Whip in the House of Commons (Accommodation and Pairing)
Alex Sobel MP	Shadow Minister for Nature Recovery and the Domestic Environment	Backbench MP
Nia Griffith MP	Shadow Minister for Exports	Shadow Minister in the Cabinet Office
Fabian Hamilton MP	Shadow Minister for Peace and Disarmament, Latin America and the Caribbean	Backbench MP
Liz Twist MP	Shadow Minister for Scotland	Backbench MP

These roles were vacant on 6 September:

- Chair of the Petitions Committee

== See also ==
- Shadow Cabinet of Keir Starmer
- Official Opposition frontbench
- May 2021 British shadow cabinet reshuffle
- November 2021 British shadow cabinet reshuffle
- 2025 British shadow cabinet reshuffle
