= Oliver Dowden =

Deputy Prime Minister of the United Kingdom from 2023 to 2024

The Right Honourable Sir Oliver Dowden KCB CBE MP
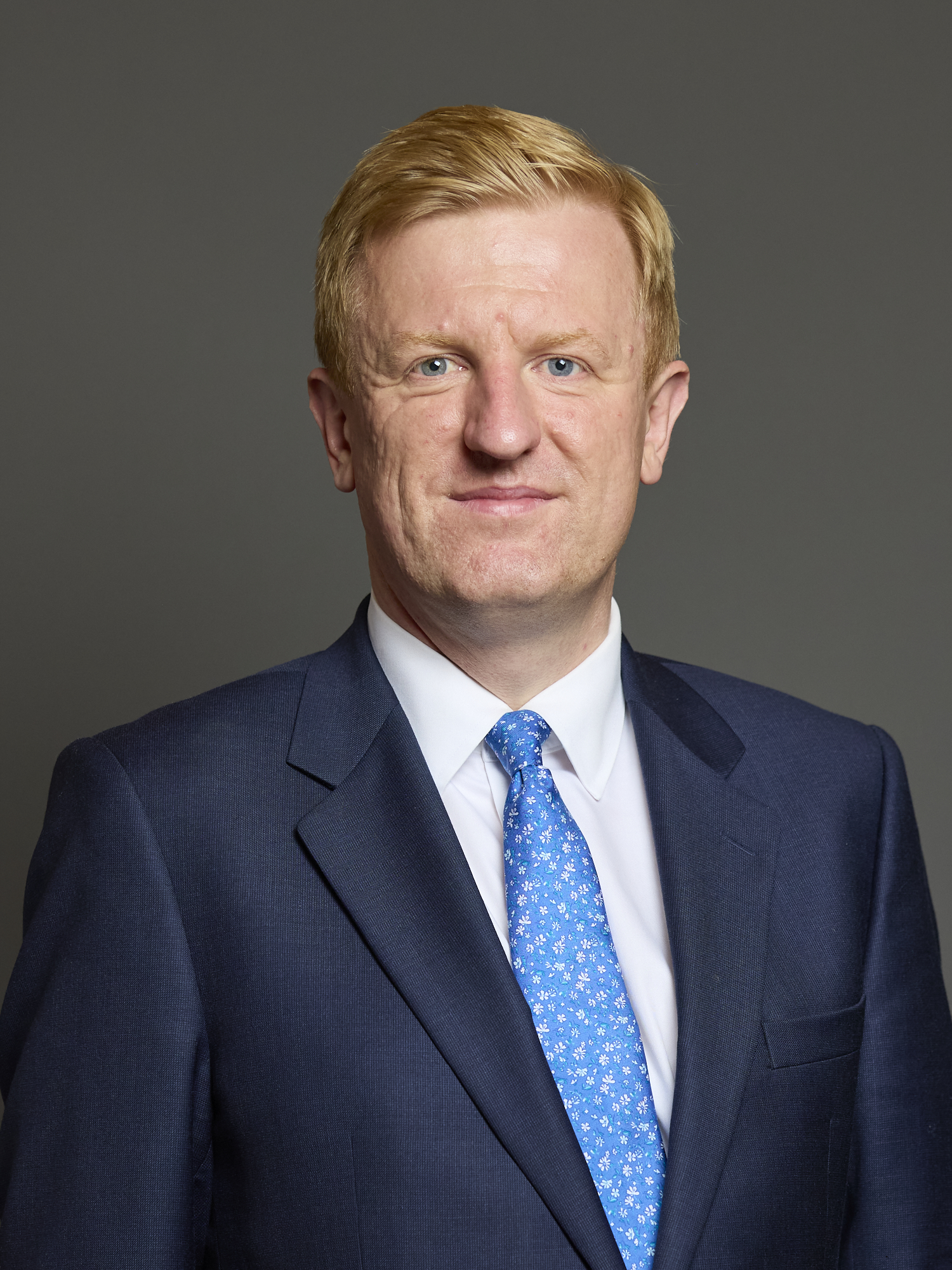
- Official portrait, 2024

Deputy Prime Minister of the United Kingdom
- In office 21 April 2023 – 5 July 2024
- Monarch: Charles III
- Prime Minister: Rishi Sunak
- Preceded by: Dominic Raab
- Succeeded by: Angela Rayner

Chairman of the Conservative Party
- In office 15 September 2021 – 24 June 2022 Serving with Ben Elliot
- Leader: Boris Johnson
- Preceded by: Amanda Milling
- Succeeded by: Andrew Stephenson
Shadow cabinet posts
Shadow Deputy Prime Minister of the United Kingdom
In office 8 July 2024 – 5 November 2024
Leader	Rishi Sunak
Preceded by	Angela Rayner
Succeeded by	Alex Burghart (Note: as Deputy Leader of the Opposition; Office vacant from 5 November 2024 to 1 September 2026.)
Shadow Chancellor of the Duchy of Lancaster
In office 8 July 2024 – 5 November 2024
Leader	Rishi Sunak
Preceded by	Pat McFadden
Succeeded by	Alex Burghart
Ministerial offices 2018‍–‍2024
Secretary of State in the Cabinet Office
In office 9 February 2023 – 5 July 2024
Prime Minister	Rishi Sunak
Preceded by	Office established
Succeeded by	Office abolished
Chancellor of the Duchy of Lancaster
In office 25 October 2022 – 5 July 2024
Prime Minister	Rishi Sunak
Preceded by	Nadhim Zahawi
Succeeded by	Pat McFadden
Minister without Portfolio
In office 15 September 2021 – 24 June 2022
Prime Minister	Boris Johnson
Preceded by	Amanda Milling
Succeeded by	Andrew Stephenson
Secretary of State for Digital, Culture, Media and Sport
In office 13 February 2020 – 15 September 2021
Prime Minister	Boris Johnson
Preceded by	The Baroness Morgan of Cotes
Succeeded by	Nadine Dorries
Minister for the Cabinet Office
In office 24 July 2019 – 13 February 2020
Prime Minister	Boris Johnson
Preceded by	David Lidington
Succeeded by	Michael Gove
Paymaster General
In office 24 July 2019 – 13 February 2020
Prime Minister	Boris Johnson
Preceded by	Jesse Norman
Succeeded by	Penny Mordaunt
Parliamentary Secretary for the Cabinet Office
In office 9 January 2018 – 24 July 2019
Prime Minister	Theresa May
Preceded by	Caroline Nokes
Succeeded by	Simon Hart

Member of Parliament for Hertsmere
- Incumbent
- Assumed office 7 May 2015
- Preceded by: James Clappison
- Majority: 7,992 (16.7%)

Personal details
- Born: Oliver James Dowden; 1 August 1978 (age 48) Park Street, Hertfordshire, England
- Party: Conservative
- Spouse: Blythe Dowden (m. 2008)
- Children: 2
- Education: Parmiter's School; Trinity Hall, Cambridge (BA)
- Website: Parliamentary website

Sir Oliver James Dowden (born 1 August 1978) is a British politician who served as Deputy Prime Minister of the United Kingdom from 2023 to 2024. A member of the Conservative Party, he previously held various ministerial positions under Prime Ministers Theresa May, Boris Johnson and Rishi Sunak between 2018 and 2024. He has been the Member of Parliament (MP) for Hertsmere since 2015.

Dowden served in the Boris Johnson government as Minister for the Cabinet Office and Paymaster General from 2019 to 2020 and Secretary of State for Digital, Culture, Media and Sport from 2020 to 2021. In the 2021 cabinet reshuffle, he was moved to the posts of Co-Chairman of the Conservative Party, serving alongside Ben Elliot, and Minister without Portfolio. He resigned from these roles in June 2022 after two by-election defeats.

Following a stint on the backbenches, he was re-appointed to the Cabinet in October 2022 by Rishi Sunak as Chancellor of the Duchy of Lancaster. He was made Secretary of State in the Cabinet office in February 2023 and, following the resignation of Dominic Raab, was appointed deputy prime minister in April of the same year. Following Labour's victory in the 2024 general election, Dowden was appointed Shadow Deputy Prime Minister in Sunak's caretaker shadow cabinet. The New Statesman named him as the tenth most powerful right-wing figure of 2023.

== Early life and career ==
Oliver Dowden was born on 1 August 1978 in Park Street, Hertfordshire. He grew up there and in Bricket Wood, and was educated at Parmiter's School, a partially selective state comprehensive school in Garston. He said he had an "excellent state education", before going to Trinity Hall, Cambridge, where he read law.

Dowden joined the Conservative Research Department in 2004, moving to PR company Hill & Knowlton in 2007, before returning to the Conservative Party in 2009.

He then worked as a special adviser and David Cameron's deputy chief of staff, where he said most of his time was spent on "day-to-day crisis management". Dowden was regarded as having expertise in the attacking form of political communications, leading to comparisons with Labour's Alastair Campbell.

== Political career ==
=== Early parliamentary career ===
Dowden was elected as MP for Hertsmere at the 2015 general election with 59.3% of the vote and a majority of 18,461 votes. During his election campaign, among the policy priorities he highlighted in his campaign were improving transport infrastructure, preserving green belt land and improving education. He made his maiden speech on 17 June 2015.

He opposed Brexit prior to the 2016 referendum, though he has subsequently supported it citing his "respect" for the verdict of the British people.

Dowden has campaigned in Hertfordshire against development of the local Green Belt, including opposing Welwyn Hatfield Borough Council's draft local plan.

Dowden was re-elected as MP for Hertsmere at the snap 2017 general election with an increased vote share of 61.1% and a decreased majority of 16,951. He was again re-elected at the 2019 general election, with an increased vote share of 62.5% and an increased majority of 21,313.

Dowden is a former officer of the Conservative Friends of Israel, and has twice chaired the APPG for British Jews. Dowden has said he feels a "cultural affinity" with the Jewish community – his constituency of Hertsmere has the largest Jewish population outside of London.

At the 2024 general election, Dowden was again re-elected, with a decreased vote share of 44.7% and a decreased majority of 7,992.

=== Junior ministerial roles ===
In January 2018, Dowden was promoted to parliamentary secretary for the Cabinet Office, as part of Theresa May's cabinet reshuffle. In June 2019, during the 2019 Conservative Party leadership election Dowden, along with Robert Jenrick and Rishi Sunak, wrote an article headlined "The Tories are in deep peril. Only Boris Johnson can save us" for The Times, endorsing former Foreign Secretary Boris Johnson for Prime Minister.

Appointed Minister for the Cabinet Office and Paymaster General by Johnson on 24 July 2019, Dowden was appointed a member of the Privy Council the next day.

As Minister for the Cabinet Office, Dowden led the government's plans to reform public procurement, after the liquidation of the contractor Carillion in 2018.

=== Secretary of State for Digital, Culture, Media and Sport ===
On 13 February 2020, Dowden was appointed Secretary of State for Digital, Culture, Media and Sport, succeeding Baroness Morgan of Cotes, who resigned from the cabinet.

During the COVID-19 pandemic, Dowden introduced a £1.57 billion support package for the arts industry, which received praise from across the sector.

In July 2020 Dowden announced that equipment provided by Chinese telecommunications company Huawei would be removed from the UK's 5G network by 2027.

Dowden asked Netflix to add a "health warning" before episodes of the series The Crown, and warned against younger viewers taking fiction as fact. Netflix did not make these changes until prior to the release of the series' fifth season.

In August 2021, Dowden announced new multi-billion pound data partnerships between the UK, Australia and the Republic of Korea, billed as an opportunity to reduce global barriers to international trade after Brexit. This presaged a series of reforms to the UK's data regime, with the aim of encouraging innovation and economic growth.

Dowden also intervened in the national debate over the so-called "cancellation" of controversial historical figures, advocating a "retain and explain" approach from museums and heritage institutions, which would be "moreist" rather than "Maoist". Dowden had previously said that "woke culture runs contrary to the great liberal traditions of Western democracies".

As the minister responsible for the UK's national collections Dowden opposed the return of historic artefacts held in British museums and galleries that had been brought to Britain during the colonial period. In particular he argued that the Benin Bronzes, most of which had been taken by force by British armed forces from Benin City in what is now Nigeria during a punitive raid in February 1897, should remain in Britain. In an interview with Channel 4 News in September 2021 about the bronzes held in the British Museum, he said "The collections of our great national institutions have been developed over many, many centuries, in many times in questionable circumstances. I think the question now is about what we do with these. I love the Benin bronzes, I've seen them many times throughout my life, and I think them being in the British Museum, which is a world repository of heritage, allows people to see it but that doesn't stop us from sharing it."

In April 2021, Dowden led government opposition to the controversial European Super League proposals, describing the planned breakaway by six Premier League clubs as "appalling" and "tone-deaf".

In June 2023 it was reported in The Daily Telegraph that Dowden had led a secretive governmental unit during his time as Culture Secretary to counter what the British government saw as lockdown dissent and COVID-19 disinformation.

=== Co-Chairman of the Conservative Party ===
On 15 September 2021, Johnson appointed Dowden as an unpaid Minister without Portfolio and Conservative Party Co-chairman during a cabinet reshuffle. In a speech at party headquarters following his appointment, Dowden told Conservative staff to "prepare for the next election".

During his time as co-chairman, Dowden continued to be identified with the controversy over 'woke culture'. On 14 February 2022, Dowden gave a speech in the US to The Heritage Foundation in which he criticised cancel culture, calling it a "painful woke psychodrama" which is sweeping the West and sapping its confidence, further saying that woke ideology is a "dangerous form of decadence". He had made similar remarks to the Conservative Party Conference in October 2021.

In April 2022, the Conservative Government announced a consultation on a measure that would give residents an automatic right to vote on proposals by their local council to change the name of the street in which they live. Street name changes would have to be put to a vote by residents and the result of that vote would have to be taken into account by the council. Dowden said in a press release quoted by the Daily Telegraph: "Labour and Liberal Democrat councils across the country are hiking council tax while squandering hard-earned local taxpayers' money on these woke pet projects that nobody wants. These proposals will give local residents a democratic check against the lefty municipal militants trying to cancel war heroes like Churchill and Nelson." As at August 2022 the consultation had not yet been published.

On 24 June 2022, Dowden resigned as co-chairman of the Conservative Party and Minister without Portfolio following the Conservative defeats at the Tiverton and Honiton by-election and Wakefield by-election, saying: "We cannot carry on with business as usual" and "Somebody must take responsibility".

Dowden declared his support for former Chancellor of the Exchequer Rishi Sunak at the beginning of the July–September leadership contest, before the first round of voting had begun and the day after Prime Minister Boris Johnson announced he would resign after a leadership election had taken place. He also supported Sunak in the October 2022 leadership contest.

=== Chancellor of the Duchy of Lancaster ===
After Sunak became prime minister on 25 October 2022, Dowden was appointed Chancellor of the Duchy of Lancaster, replacing Nadhim Zahawi, and as Secretary of State in the Cabinet Office, a new position, on 9 February 2023. As of 2023, he is therefore responsible for overseeing the implementation of the UK Biological Security strategy.

=== Deputy Prime Minister of the United Kingdom ===
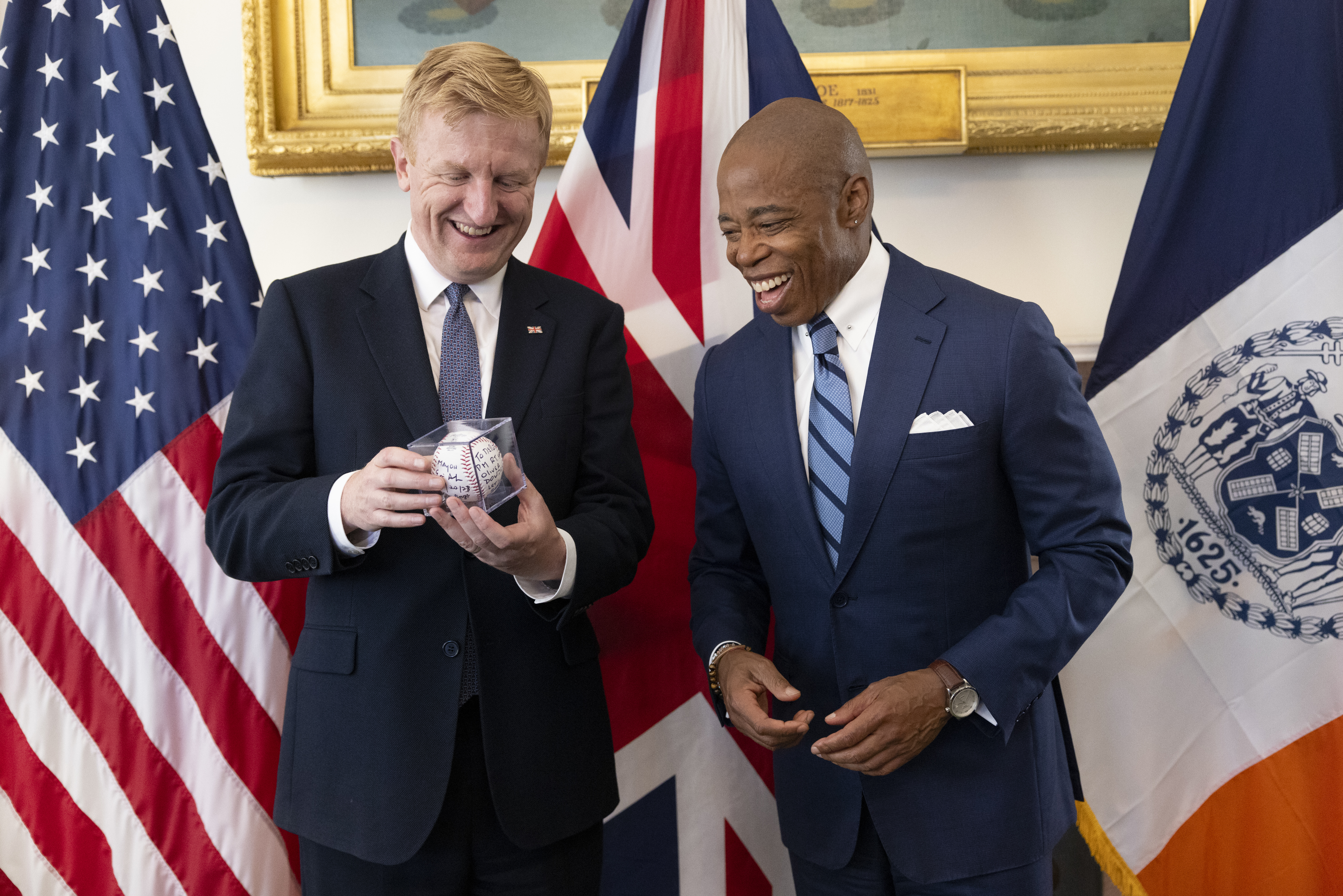
Dowden with New York City Mayor Eric Adams in October 2023

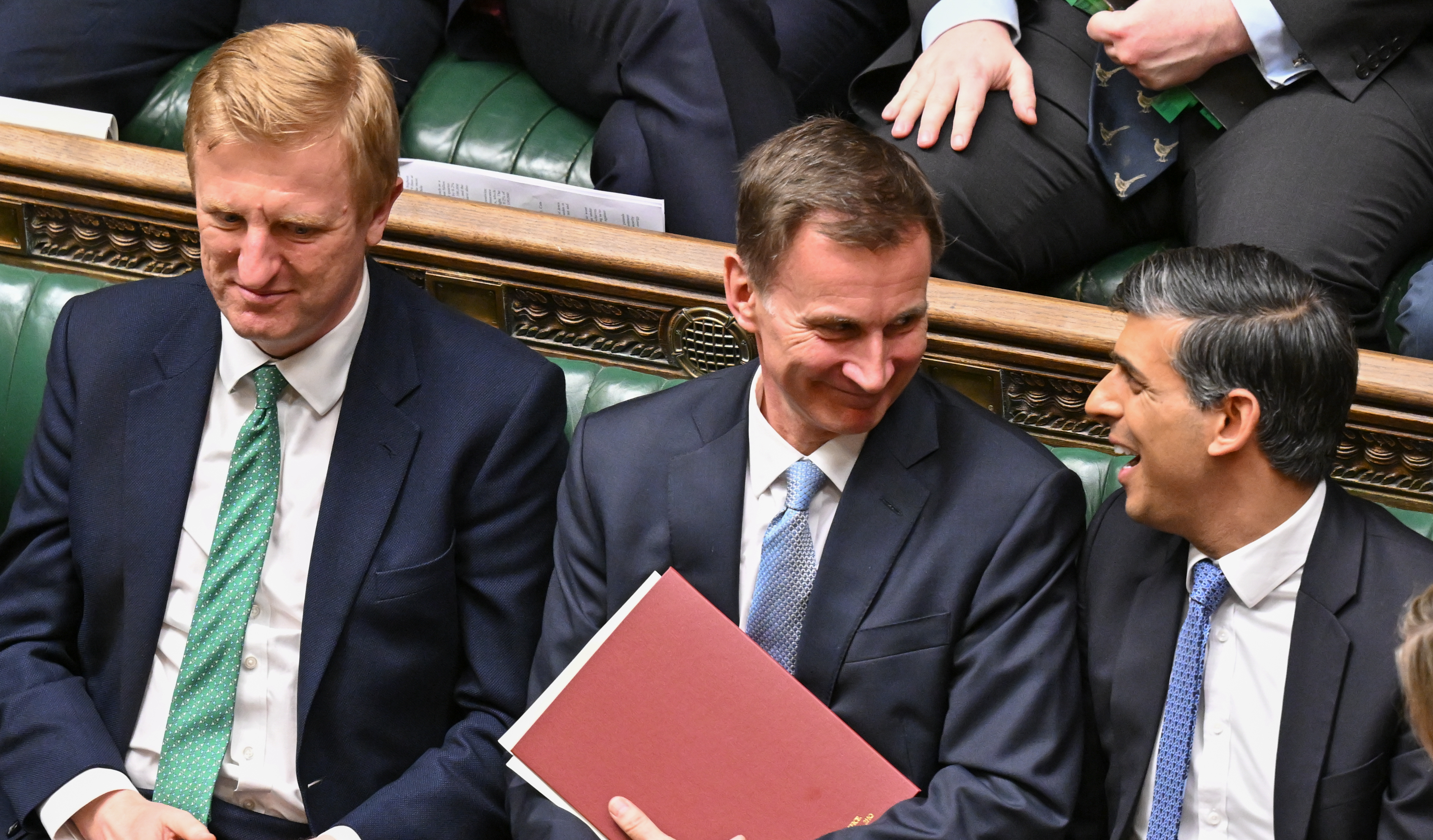
Dowden (left) as Deputy Prime Minister, with Jeremy Hunt and Rishi Sunak, in 2024

On 21 April 2023, following Dominic Raab's resignation after a report over claims he bullied staff was given to Sunak, Dowden was appointed as the deputy prime minister.

As Deputy Prime Minister, Dowden deputised for Sunak at Prime Minister's Questions five times; four in 2023 – on 17 May, 7 June, 5 July and 12 July – and on 24 April 2024. He also took charge of the 'day to day' business of government whilst Sunak was on holiday in August 2023, and in September 2023 he addressed the annual gathering of the United Nations General Assembly in Sunak's place, with a speech on artificial intelligence.

The New Statesman named Dowden as the tenth most powerful right-wing figure of 2023, stating "there are few with as much influence on how the government operates".

On 25 March 2024 Dowden delivered a government statement on Chinese interference with domestic political processes. He indicated that the foreign interference offence might be brought to bear, especially in terms of APT31 which had been unsuccessful in its attempt to access secret data.

=== In opposition ===
Following the Conservative Party's defeat in the 2024 general election and the subsequent formation of the Starmer ministry, Dowden was appointed Shadow Deputy Prime Minister in Rishi Sunak's caretaker Shadow Cabinet.

Angela Rayner jokingly said she would miss her and Dowden's "battle of the gingers" in their last debate at Prime Minister's Questions.

Dowden returned to the backbenches upon the election of Kemi Badenoch as Leader of the Conservative Party.

== Advisory work ==
In September 2022, during a period when he was not in ministerial office, Dowden took up advisory roles with Caxton Associates LP, a global macro hedge fund, and Pierce Protocols (trading as Heni), an art services firm. He resigned both roles on returning to a cabinet role, as Chancellor of the Duchy of Lancaster, in October 2022. According to his entry in the Parliamentary Register of Members' Financial Interests, he returned to the Caxton Associates role in November 2024 and to the Pierce Protocols role in January 2025. In June 2025, Dowden took up another advisory role, with Francisco Partners Management LP, a private equity firm with a technology focus.

== Personal life ==
Dowden is married to Blythe Dowden, a teacher, and they have two children.

== Honours ==
Dowden was appointed a Commander of the Order of the British Empire (CBE) in the 2015 Dissolution Honours on 22 September 2015 for political service as Cameron's deputy chief of staff. On 4 July 2024, he was subsequently appointed Knight Commander of the Order of the Bath (KCB) in the 2024 Dissolution Honours for political and public service.

== Notes ==
Parliament of the United Kingdom
Preceded by James Clappison	Member of Parliament for Hertsmere; 2015–present	Incumbent
Political offices
Preceded by Caroline Nokes	Parliamentary Secretary for the Cabinet Office; 2018–2019	Succeeded by Johnny Mercer
Preceded by David Lidington	Minister for the Cabinet Office; 2019–2020	Succeeded by Michael Gove
Preceded by Jesse Norman	Paymaster General; 2019–2020	Succeeded by Penny Mordaunt
Preceded by The Baroness Morgan of Cotes	Secretary of State for Digital, Culture, Media and Sport; 2020–2021	Succeeded by Nadine Dorries
Preceded by Amanda Milling	Minister without Portfolio; 2021–2022	Succeeded by Andrew Stephenson
Preceded by Nadhim Zahawi	Chancellor of the Duchy of Lancaster; 2022–2024	Succeeded by Pat McFadden
New office	Secretary of State in the Cabinet Office; 2023–2024	Office abolished
Preceded by Dominic Raab	Deputy Prime Minister of the United Kingdom; 2023–2024	Succeeded by Angela Rayner
Preceded by Angela Rayner	Shadow Deputy Prime Minister of the United Kingdom; 2024	Vacant
Preceded by Angela Rayner	Deputy Leader of the Opposition; 2024	Vacant Title next held by Alex Burghart
Preceded by Angela Rayner	Shadow Chancellor of the Duchy of Lancaster; 2024	Succeeded by Alex Burghart
Party political offices
Preceded by Amanda Milling; Ben Elliot	Chairman of the Conservative Party; Serving with Ben Elliot; 2021–2022	Succeeded by Andrew Stephenson
