= Andrew Lansley =

British politician (born 1956)

The Right Honourable The Lord Lansley CBE PC DL
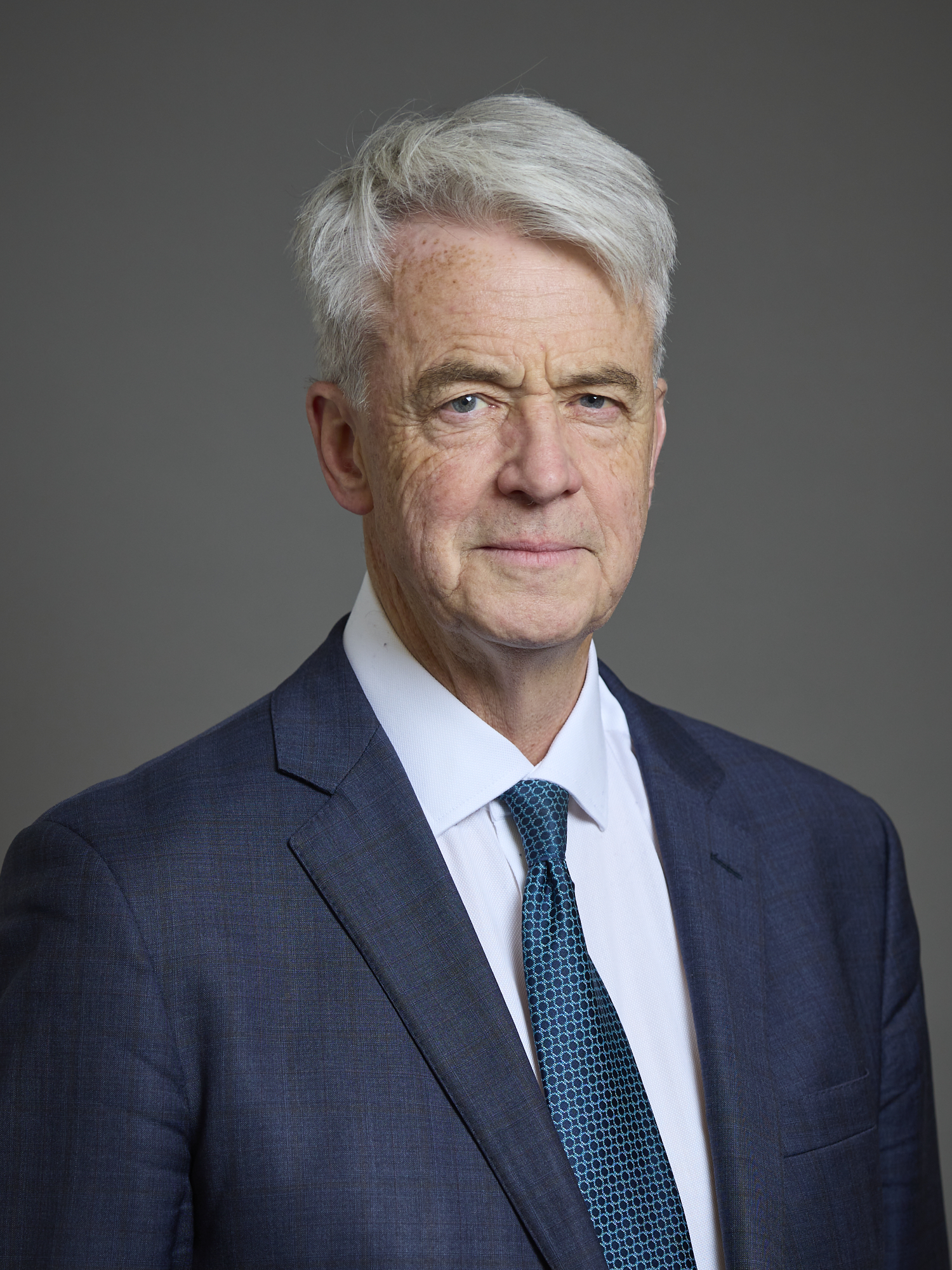
- Official portrait, 2025

Leader of the House of Commons
- In office 4 September 2012 – 14 July 2014
- Prime Minister: David Cameron
- Preceded by: George Young
- Succeeded by: William Hague

Lord Keeper of the Privy Seal
- In office 4 September 2012 – 14 July 2014
- Prime Minister: David Cameron
- Preceded by: George Young
- Succeeded by: The Baroness Stowell of Beeston

Secretary of State for Health
- In office 12 May 2010 – 4 September 2012
- Prime Minister: David Cameron
- Preceded by: Andy Burnham
- Succeeded by: Jeremy Hunt
Shadow cabinet posts
Shadow Secretary of State for Health
In office 19 June 2004 – 11 May 2010
Leader	Michael Howard; David Cameron
Preceded by	Tim Yeo
Succeeded by	Andy Burnham
Shadow Minister for the Cabinet Office
In office 15 June 1999 – 18 September 2001
Leader	William Hague
Preceded by	Office established
Succeeded by	Tim Collins
Parliamentary offices
Member of the House of Lords
Lord Temporal
Life peerage 5 October 2015
Member of Parliament for South Cambridgeshire
In office 1 May 1997 – 30 March 2015
Preceded by	Constituency established
Succeeded by	Heidi Allen

Personal details
- Born: 11 December 1956 (age 69) Hornchurch, England
- Party: Conservative (since 1988)
- Other political affiliations: SDP (until 1988)
- Spouse(s): Marilyn Biggs (Divorced); Sally Low
- Children: 5
- Education: University of Exeter
- Website: Official website

Andrew David Lansley, Baron Lansley (born 11 December 1956) is a British Conservative politician who previously served as Secretary of State for Health and Leader of the House of Commons. He was Member of Parliament (MP) for South Cambridgeshire from 1997 to 2015.

Lansley was born in Hornchurch, Essex, and studied Politics at the University of Exeter. He worked in the civil service before entering politics. He ran the Conservatives' campaign in the 1992 general election while at the Conservative Research Department, and later was Vice-Chairman of the Conservative Party at the 2001 general election.

Lansley was the Shadow Secretary of State for Health from 2004 until 2010, the Secretary of State for Health from 2010 until 2012, and Leader of the House of Commons from 2012 until 2014. As Health Secretary, Lansley was responsible for the government's controversial Health and Social Care Act 2012. Lansley announced his intention to stand down as an MP in 2015, and was awarded a life peerage in the 2015 Dissolution Honours. Following his career in Westminster, Lansley advised corporate clients on healthcare reforms.

== Early life ==
Born in Hornchurch, Essex, Lansley was educated at Brentwood School and the University of Exeter, gaining a BA in politics. In 1977 while at Exeter University, Lansley was elected President of the Guild of Students (Student Union), as a Tory Reform Group candidate.

His father Thomas Stewart Lansley (December 4, 1920 - November 12, 2010) attended Tottenham County School. After the war his father attended a school reunion, which was important, as at that reunion he met Irene, the mother of Andrew Lansley, and were married in 1947. They had three sons. Thomas Lansley was at East Ham Memorial Hospital from 1955 to 1983. His father worked in a pathology laboratory, and became co-founder of the Council for Professions Supplementary to Medicine and President of the Institute of Medical Laboratory Scientists.

His father was awarded the OBE in the 1975 Birthday Honours. His father worked with the Bible Society. His mother died in 2014 in Hertfordshire.

Before entering politics, Lansley had "a promising career in the civil service". Lansley worked for Norman Tebbit for three years as his private secretary at the Department of Trade and Industry. This encompassed the period of the IRA's 1984 Brighton hotel bombing at the Conservative Party Conference in which Tebbit was seriously injured. Lansley and others have been praised by Tebbit for their support at that time.

Lansley went on to become more fully involved in politics. A member of the Social Democratic Party who joined the Conservatives after the SDP dissolved in 1988, he was appointed in 1990 to run the Conservative Research Department. He ran the Conservative campaign for the 1992 general election, which he describes as one of "his proudest career achievements" He suffered a minor stroke in 1992, initially misdiagnosed as an ear infection, but made a full recovery save for permanently losing his sense of "fine balance".

He was appointed a Commander of the Order of the British Empire (CBE) for political service in the 1996 New Year Honours.

== Member of parliament ==
Lansley sought to enter parliament and was selected for the South Cambridgeshire seat where he was subsequently elected as an MP in 1997. He immediately joined the House of Commons health select committee.

At the 2001 election, he again took on a strategy role as a vice-chairman of the Conservative Party. The 2001 election was not a success for the Conservative Party, and its leader William Hague subsequently resigned. Iain Duncan Smith, the new leader, offered Lansley a position following election but he turned this down and, until Michael Howard became Leader, Lansley was a backbencher.

Lansley was appointed a Privy Counsellor upon becoming health secretary on 13 May 2010.

== Shadow cabinet ==
Following Howard's election as party leader, Lansley soon returned to the Conservative frontbench. He served as the Shadow Secretary of State for Health. In his post he developed policies centred on using choice to improve the National Health Service, and was author of a chapter in Dr Tempest's 2006 book The Future of the NHS.

== Cabinet minister ==
After becoming prime minister in May 2010, David Cameron named Lansley as Health Secretary in the Conservative/Liberal Democrat coalition government.

On 4 September 2012, Lansley was moved to the positions of Lord Privy Seal and Leader of the House of Commons, which he retained until 14 July 2014. He was then replaced by William Hague, following Hague's surprise resignation as foreign secretary, and retired from the cabinet to the back benches, announcing the same day that he would not be seeking re-election to the House of Commons at the next election and would hope to find an international role. In the event, the election came on 7 May 2015, and until his appointment to the House of Lords in October Lansley was out of parliament.

=== Proposed health reforms ===
In November 2010, Lansley provoked controversy by factoring into public health related bills representations from fast food companies such as McDonald's, KFC and processed food and drink manufacturers PepsiCo, Kellogg's, Unilever, Mars and Diageo on obesity, diet-related disease and alcohol, said by campaign groups to be the equivalent of handing smoking policy over to the tobacco industry.

In January 2011, ministers published the Health and Social Care Bill, detailing planned reforms that would pave the way for GP consortia to take over management of the NHS from primary care trusts. Prime minister David Cameron said "fundamental changes" were needed in the NHS.

But doctors' leaders believed that GPs could simply have taken charge of PCTs instead, and achieved the same results. The reforms were intended to pave the way for groups of GPs to take control of NHS budgets, with the consortia to take charge in 2013 of about 80% of the funding and of planning and buying everything, from community health centres to hospital services. However, some specialist services such as neurosurgery would be provided by a national board.

In a letter to The Times, British Medical Association chairman Hamish Meldrum, Royal College of Nursing chief executive Peter Carter, and the heads of the Unison and Unite unions, said the speed and scale of the reforms proposed risked undermining the care of patients by putting cost before quality. Criticism of the reforms had been mounting ahead of the publication of the Health and Social Care Bill on 19 January 2011.

Following the widespread criticism, on 4 April 2011, the Government announced a "pause" in the progress of the Health and Social Care Bill to allow the government to 'listen, reflect and improve' on the proposals.

In November 2011, Lansley faced more criticism when he appeared speaking on a video played at NHS patients' bedside in England, the continuous loop video was played to patients as the main free content on the Hospedia system. When asked by Tom Blenkinsop MP, Lansley replied that he received no payment and there was no cost to the taxpayer.

On 13 April 2011, 96 per cent of 497 delegates at the Royal College of Nursing conference backed a motion of no confidence questioning Andrew Lansley's handling of NHS reforms in England. Later that day, Lansley met with 65 nurses at the same conference, and apologised by saying "I am sorry if what I'm setting out to do hasn't communicated itself."

In May 2012, Lansley appeared at the Royal College of Nursing annual conference where he stated that although "the number of qualified nurses has gone down by nearly 3,000... clinical staffing levels overall have gone up by nearly 4,000". His comments at the conference were met with uproar from nurses and union members in the audience with heckling and some shouting "liar". The Royal College's general secretary, Dr Peter Carter criticised the health secretary's claim as being "nonsense that there's more clinical staff than there was two years ago is just incorrect" and later told the health secretary that currently "There is a great deal of unhappiness" amongst nurses and health care professionals, with a standing ovation from the audience.

On 28 June 2012, doctors meeting at a British Medical Association conference voted in favour of calling for Lansley's resignation.

Doctors voted in agreement of a motion stating "This meeting has no confidence in Andrew Lansley, the Secretary of State for Health, and calls for him to resign". In the meeting, Lansley was accused by the BMA of "breaching doctors' trust" over pension agreements, and was accused by Dr Gary Marlowe who tabled the motion that "during the election he (Lansley) misled the public and the profession" regarding the Health and Social Care Bill. Before voting, Marlowe also stated that "The Bill went through a stunning number of amendments and revisions. I believe the most of any Bill. How can we trust someone with such a poor record with our NHS?"

On 4 September 2012, Lansley was replaced in his role as health secretary by Jeremy Hunt, with Lansley becoming Leader of the House of Commons.

In the years that followed, the reforms remained the focus of criticism by both the medical profession and independent bodies. In 2024 an independent report commissioned by the Government described the Lansley reforms as "a calamity without international precedent".

== Salt reduction ==
In 2010, responsibility for nutrition policy was transferred to the Department of Health. As Secretary of State for Health, Andrew Lansley was accused by the BMJ of allowing the food industry to stall progress in reducing salt content in food (subsequently restarted in 2014 by Anna Soubry with publication of new targets effective in 2017).

== Public behaviour ==
A poster critical of Lansley being carried during the 2011 anti-cuts protest in London.

=== Suggested conflicts of interest ===
Until December 2009, Lansley received £134 an hour from a firm of advertisers that represents clients such as Walkers Crisps, McDonald's, Unilever, Mars and Pizza Hut; Private Eye suggests a link between these activities and Lansley's desire to see a more lightly regulated food industry. The same publication suggested a similar link to a Department of Health report on red meat in which the only products listed in the report found to contain suitable amounts of red meat to merit a "Good" rating were a McDonald's Big Mac, and a Peperami (manufactured by Unilever).

While in opposition as health spokesman, Andrew Lansley accepted a donation of £21,000 from John Nash, the chairman of private healthcare provider Care UK and founder of the private equity fund Sovereign Capital, which owns several other private healthcare companies, to help fund his private office, leading to allegations of a conflict of interest. Such companies stand to be the largest beneficiaries of Lansley's bill passed by the Coalition and House of Lords to increase the use of private health providers within the NHS.

As reported in February 2011, Lansley's wife advised attendees at a business conference to "establish positive relationships with decision-makers". Although staff members of Low Associates, the PR firm she runs, had food and drug companies among their clients before joining Low Associates, the firm denies it has any clients in the health sector.

As of 2011, Andrew Lansley's wife, Sally Low, was the managing director of Low Associates. Sally Low denied that Low Associates was involved in lobbying and instead described its activities as provision of "strategic advice" to clients. Low Associates helps people prepare before they give evidence to committees of MPs, and Sally Low gave speeches on improving lobbying skills, in which she said that lobbyists should "establish positive relationships with decision-makers before you need their help". Lobbyist clients of Low Associates personnel have previously worked for a variety of companies including those with an interest in health, such as SmithKline Beecham, Unilever and Procter & Gamble.

=== Recession ===
Lansley wrote a blog entry on the Conservative Party website in November 2008 which included comments that a recession could be "good for us" in many ways, stating: "People tend to smoke less, drink less alcohol, eat less rich food and spend time at home with their families." He later apologised, stating: "I am very sorry for any offence this has caused."

=== Parliamentary expenses ===
In the Parliamentary expenses scandal in 2009, Lansley was accused of 'flipping', or redesignating, his second home, after claiming for renovation of a rural cottage prior to selling it. It is claimed that he then 'flipped' his second home designation to a London flat, and claimed thousands of pounds for furniture. Lansley responded to the claims by stating that his claims were "within the rules". He owns a Pimlico property, but claimed over £7,000 for hotel stays.

== House of Lords ==
Lansley was created a Life Peer, taking the title Baron Lansley, of Orwell in the County of Cambridgeshire, on 5 October 2015.

== Personal life ==
Lansley married his first wife Dr Marilyn Jane Biggs, from Bishop's Stortford, in December 1985 at St James church in Thorley, Hertfordshire. The reception was at Stansted. They had three daughters. They separated in November 1997 and divorced in 2000.

Lansley married Sally Low, with whom he has had a son and a daughter.

In April 2018, Lansley revealed that he had stage 3 bowel cancer. He has called for the government to widen the cancer screening programme on the NHS.

== Honours ==
- Order of the Rising Sun, 2nd Class, Gold and Silver Star (2025)

Parliament of the United Kingdom
New constituency	Member of Parliament for South Cambridgeshire; 1997–2015	Succeeded by Heidi Allen
Political offices
New office	Shadow Minister for the Cabinet Office; 1999–2001	Succeeded by Tim Collins
Preceded by Tim Yeo	Shadow Secretary of State for Health; 2004–2010	Succeeded by Andy Burnham
Preceded by Andy Burnham	Secretary of State for Health; 2010–2012	Succeeded by Jeremy Hunt
Preceded by George Young	Leader of the House of Commons; 2012–2014	Succeeded by William Hague
Preceded by George Young	Lord Privy Seal; 2012–2014	Succeeded by The Baroness Stowell of Beeston
Orders of precedence in the United Kingdom
Preceded by The Lord Polak	Gentlemen; Baron Lansley	Followed by The Lord Oates
