= Shadow Minister for the Cabinet Office =

Position in the British Shadow Cabinet

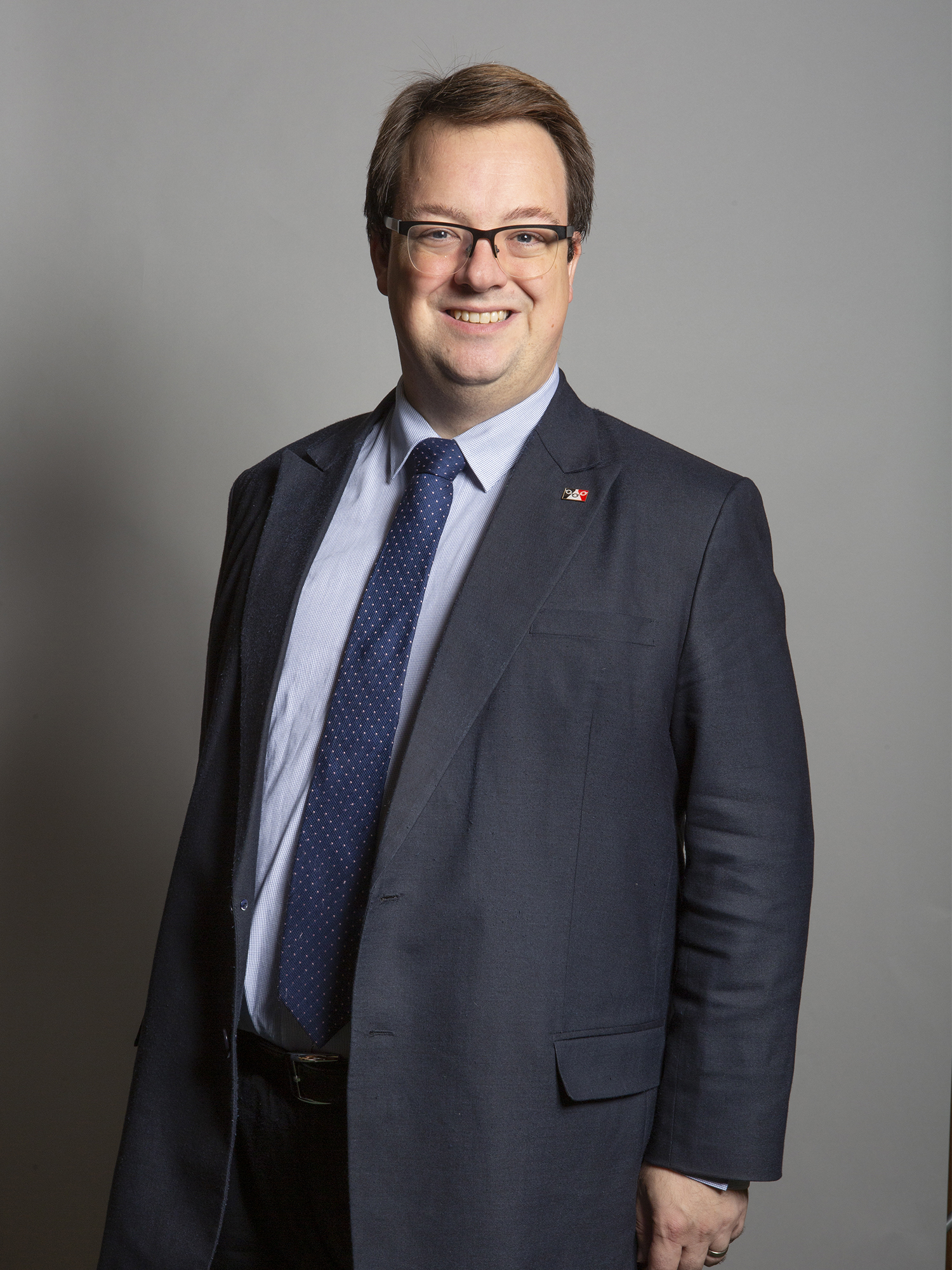
- Incumbent; Mike Wood since 6 September 2024
- Shadow cabinet
- Appointer: Leader of the Opposition
- Formation: 15 June 1999
- First holder: Andrew Lansley

The Shadow Minister for the Cabinet Office is a position on the Official Opposition frontbench attending the British Shadow Cabinet, appointed by the Leader of the Opposition. The post involves holding the Cabinet Office and the Minister for the Cabinet Office to account.

The position has been held by Mike Wood since September 2024.

== Shadow Ministers for the Cabinet Office ==
Name	Portrait	Term of office		Title	Party	Leader
Andrew Lansley		15 June 1999	18 September 2001	Shadow Minister for the Cabinet Office	Conservative	Hague
Tim Collins		18 September 2001	23 July 2002	Shadow Minister for the Cabinet Office	Conservative	Duncan Smith
Unknown						
Francis Maude		2 July 2007	11 May 2010	Shadow Chancellor of the Duchy of Lancaster	Conservative	Cameron
Tessa Jowell		11 May 2010	8 October 2010	Shadow Minister for the Cabinet Office	Labour	Harman
Liam Byrne		8 October 2010	20 January 2011	Shadow Minister for the Cabinet Office	Labour	Miliband
Tessa Jowell		20 January 2011	7 October 2011	Shadow Minister for the Cabinet Office	Labour	Miliband
Jon Trickett		7 October 2011	7 October 2013	Shadow Minister for the Cabinet Office	Labour	Miliband
Michael Dugher		7 October 2013	5 November 2014	Shadow Minister for the Cabinet Office	Labour	Miliband
Lucy Powell		5 November 2014	14 September 2015	Shadow Minister for the Cabinet Office	Labour	Miliband
Lucy Powell		5 November 2014	14 September 2015	Shadow Minister for the Cabinet Office	Labour	Harman
Tom Watson		14 September 2015	7 October 2016	Shadow Minister for the Cabinet Office	Labour	Corbyn
Ian Lavery		7 October 2016	9 February 2017	Shadow Minister for the Cabinet Office	Labour	Corbyn
Jon Trickett		9 February 2017	5 April 2020	Shadow Lord President of the Council	Labour	Corbyn
Rachel Reeves		5 April 2020	9 May 2021	Shadow Chancellor of the Duchy of Lancaster	Labour	Starmer
Angela Rayner		9 May 2021	4 September 2023	Shadow Minister for the Cabinet Office and Shadow Chancellor of the Duchy of Lancaster	Labour	Starmer
Jenny Chapman, Baroness Chapman of Darlington		22 June 2021	5 July 2024	Shadow Minister for the Cabinet Office	Labour	Starmer
Lucy Neville-Rolfe, Baroness Neville-Rolfe		5 July 2024	6 November 2024	Shadow Minister for the Cabinet Office	Conservative	Sunak
Mike Wood		6 November 2024	Incumbent	Shadow Minister for the Cabinet Office	Conservative	Badenoch

== See also ==
- Official Opposition frontbench
- Starmer shadow cabinet
- Shadow Deputy Prime Minister of the United Kingdom
- Shadow Chancellor of the Duchy of Lancaster
- Shadow Minister of State at the Cabinet Office
