= Alex Burghart =

British politician (born 1977)

Alex Burghart MP
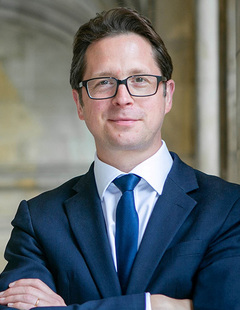
- Official portrait, 2021

Deputy Leader of the Opposition
- Incumbent
- Assumed office 31 August 2026
- Leader: Kemi Badenoch
- Preceded by: Oliver Dowden (Note: Office vacant from 5 November 2024 to 1 September 2026. Previously titled Shadow Deputy Prime Minister)

Deputy Leader of the Conservative Party
- Incumbent
- Assumed office 31 August 2026
- Leader: Kemi Badenoch
- Preceded by: Michael Ancram (Note: Office vacant between 6 December 2005 and 1 September 2026.)
Shadow cabinet positions
Shadow Chancellor of the Duchy of Lancaster
Incumbent
Assumed office 5 November 2024
Leader	Kemi Badenoch
Preceded by	Oliver Dowden
Shadow Secretary of State for Northern Ireland
Incumbent
Assumed office 8 July 2024
Leader	Rishi Sunak; Kemi Badenoch
Preceded by	Hilary Benn
Junior ministerial offices
Parliamentary Secretary for the Cabinet Office
In office 27 October 2022 – 5 July 2024
Prime Minister	Rishi Sunak
Preceded by	Brendan Clarke-Smith
Succeeded by	Georgia Gould
Parliamentary Under-Secretary of State for Pensions and Growth
In office 20 September 2022 (Note: Office vacant between 8 and 20 September 2022.) – 27 October 2022
Prime Minister	Liz Truss; Rishi Sunak
Preceded by	Guy Opperman
Succeeded by	Laura Trott
Parliamentary Under-Secretary of State for Apprenticeships and Skills
In office 17 September 2021 – 6 July 2022
Prime Minister	Boris Johnson
Preceded by	Gillian Keegan
Succeeded by	Vacant
Parliamentary Private Secretary to the Prime Minister
In office 26 July 2019 – 16 September 2021
Prime Minister	Boris Johnson
Preceded by	Andrew Bowie
Succeeded by	Andrew Griffith; Sarah Dines

Member of Parliament for Brentwood and Ongar
- Incumbent
- Assumed office 8 June 2017
- Preceded by: Eric Pickles
- Majority: 5,980 (12.4%)

Personal details
- Born: Michael Alex Burghart; 7 September 1977 (age 49) Wimborne Minster, Dorset, England
- Party: Conservative
- Spouse: Hermione Eyre (m. 2012)
- Children: 2
- Education: Christ Church, Oxford (MA); King's College London (PhD)
- Profession: Teacher
- Website: www.alexburghart.org.uk

Michael Alex Burghart (born 7 September 1977) is a British politician, academic and former teacher who has served as Deputy Leader of the Opposition and Deputy Leader of the Conservative Party since 31 August 2026, as Shadow Secretary of State for Northern Ireland since 8 July 2024, and Shadow Chancellor of the Duchy of Lancaster since 5 November 2024. A member of the Conservative Party, he has been Member of Parliament (MP) for Brentwood and Ongar since 2017.

Born in Dorset, Burghart studied history at Christ Church, Oxford. After a period working as a history tutor at King's College London, Burghart became a political and policy adviser to Tim Loughton in 2008. He then served successively as Director of Policy at the Centre for Social Justice, Director of Strategy and Advocacy for the Children's Commissioner for England Anne Longfield, and as a special adviser in Prime Minister Theresa May's policy team. He was elected to the House of Commons for Brentwood and Ongar at the 2017 general election.

Burghart served as the Parliamentary Private Secretary to Prime Minister Boris Johnson from 2019 to 2021 and was promoted to Parliamentary Under-Secretary of State for Apprenticeships and Skills in the second cabinet reshuffle of the second Johnson ministry. He resigned from this position in July 2022, criticising Johnson's handling of the Chris Pincher scandal. Burghart was appointed Parliamentary Under-Secretary of State for Pensions and Growth in September 2022 and later Parliamentary Secretary for the Cabinet Office in October 2022.

After the Conservative Party's defeat in the 2024 General Election, Burghart was appointed Shadow Secretary of State for Northern Ireland in the Sunak caretaker Shadow Cabinet, and was retained in the post after Kemi Badenoch became leader, also gaining the additional role of Shadow Chancellor of the Duchy of Lancaster. He became Deputy Leader of the Opposition and Deputy Leader of the Conservative Party in September 2026.

== Early life and education ==
Michael Alex Burghart was born on 7 September 1977 in Wimborne Minster in Dorset, the son of two state school teachers. He was educated at the independent Millfield School in Somerset. Burghart studied history at Christ Church, Oxford. He completed his PhD at King's College London in 2007 entitled The Mercian polity, 716–918.

== Career ==
=== Academia ===
After university, Burghart taught history at Warwick School before becoming a history tutor at King's College London. In 2005 he was the lead researcher for the King's College London project on interrogating Anglo-Saxon charters using digital technologies. While at Kings, Burghart contributed towards the Prosopography of Anglo-Saxon England.

=== Policy adviser ===
Burghart became a political and policy adviser to Tim Loughton, who was the then Shadow Minister for Children and Young People in 2008. He moved on to the Department for Education, where he worked on the Munro Review of Child Protection.

In 2012 Burghart became Director of Policy at the Centre for Social Justice. In February 2016 he was appointed Director of Strategy and Advocacy for the Children's Commissioner for England, Anne Longfield. Later that year he became a special adviser of Prime Minister Theresa May's policy team.

=== Writing ===
Burghart is the author of A Better Start in Life: Long-term approaches for the most vulnerable children, published by Policy Exchange in 2013. He often reviews books about early medieval England, writing nine book reviews for The Times Literary Supplement over a period of 12 years, and twelve book reviews for The Spectator over the past decade (correct as of September 2026). He has also written an article in BBC History Magazine.

== Parliamentary career ==
=== Early political career ===
Burghart stood against Labour MP Jeremy Corbyn in Islington North in 2015. He told the Islington Gazette that, if elected, the first thing he would do would be to "[d]ance a jig (and try to resuscitate Jeremy Corbyn)." Although he was not elected, Burghart came second, increasing the Conservative share of the vote from 14.2% to 17.2%.

He was selected for the Brentwood and Ongar safe seat on 28 April 2017 after Sir Eric Pickles announced that he would stand down at the 2017 general election. At the election, Burghart was elected as MP for Brentwood and Ongar, winning 65.8% of the vote and a majority of 24,002.

Burghart has been a member of the Joint Committee on Human Rights and the Work and Pensions Select Committee. He chairs the APPG on Adverse Childhood Experiences and was made PPS to the new prime minister Boris Johnson in July 2019. He was previously Parliamentary Private Secretary to the Attorney General, Geoffrey Cox, and to the Secretary of State for Northern Ireland, Karen Bradley.

=== In government ===
In July 2019, at the formation of the first Johnson ministry, Burghart was appointed Parliamentary Private Secretary to the Prime Minister.

At the 2019 general election, Burghart was re-elected as the MP for Brentwood and Ongar with an increased vote share of 68.6% and an increased majority of 29,065.

On 17 September 2021, Burghart was appointed Parliamentary Under-Secretary of State for Apprenticeships and Skills at the Department for Education during the second cabinet reshuffle of the second Johnson ministry.

On 20 September 2022, Burghart was appointed Parliamentary Under-Secretary of State for Pensions and Growth at the Department for Work and Pensions in Liz Truss's cabinet reshuffle. He was appointed Parliamentary Secretary for the Cabinet Office on 27 October 2022, with responsibilities including the Grenfell Tower Inquiry, the COVID-19 Inquiry, the Government Digital Service and the Central Digital and Data Office.

=== In opposition ===
At the 2024 general election, Burghart was again re-elected, with a decreased vote share of 36.7% and a decreased majority of 5,980. Following the subsequent formation of the Starmer ministry, he was appointed Shadow Northern Ireland Secretary in Rishi Sunak's caretaker Shadow Cabinet.

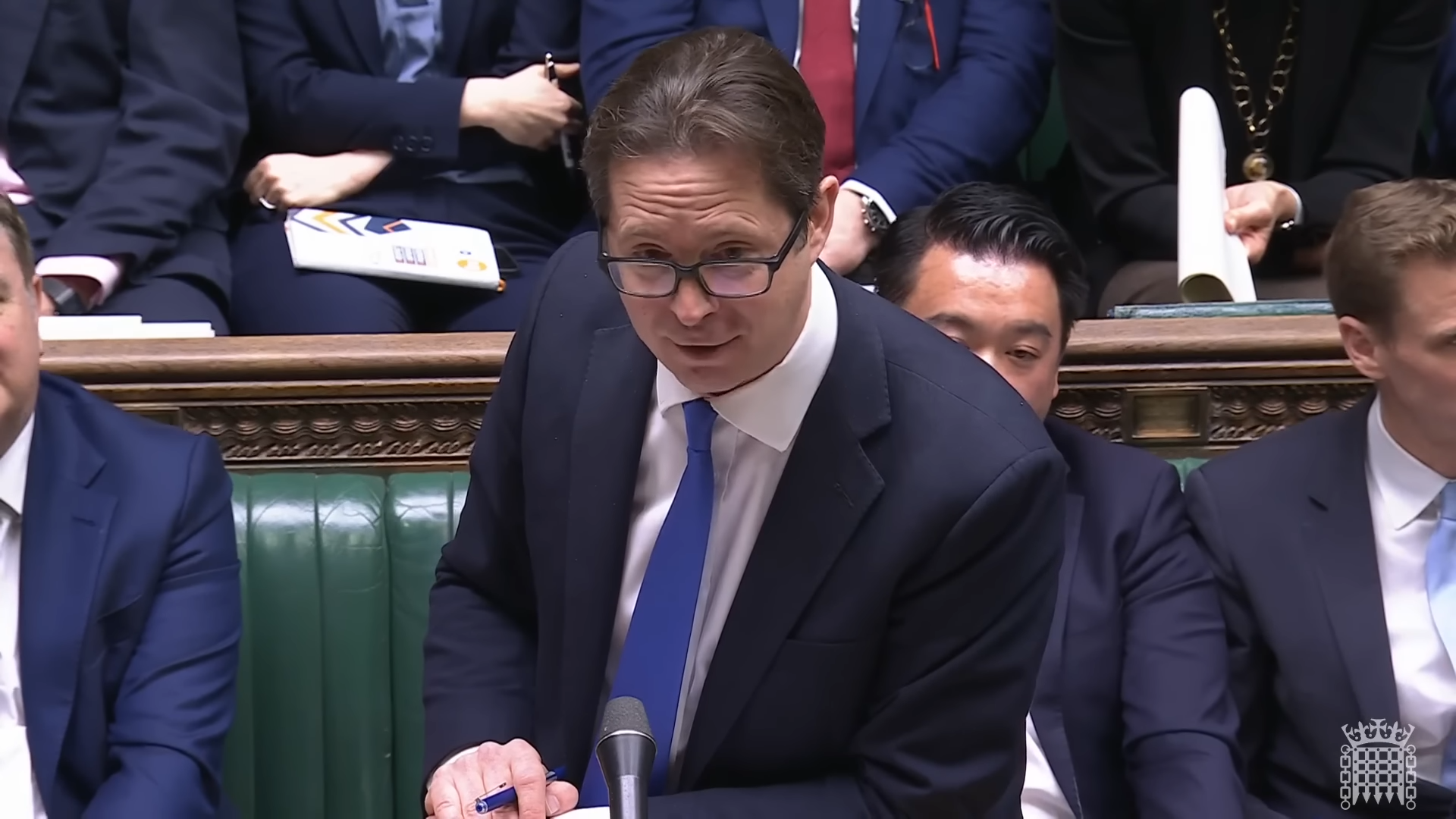
Burghart during deputy Prime Minister's Questions in November 2024

In November 2024, following Kemi Badenoch's election as Conservative Party leader, Burghart was appointed Shadow Chancellor of the Duchy of Lancaster. In this role, he was referred to as Badenoch's de facto deputy by newspapers such as The Guardian and The National, though Burghart himself rejected this label in 2025.

According to The Spectator, Burghart is seen as Badenoch's primary policy figure, influenced by the 1976 Conservative statement The Right Approach. He has been compared to Keith Joseph, who played a similar role for Margaret Thatcher, by ConservativeHome writer William Atkinson.

Burghart stood in for Badenoch at Prime Minister's Questions on 20 November 2024.

In August 2026, during the 2026 British shadow cabinet reshuffle, he was appointed Deputy Leader of the Opposition and Deputy Leader of the Conservative Party by the Conservative leader Kemi Badenoch.

== Personal life ==
Burghart has sat on the Board of the Yarlington Housing Group and was Vice Chair of Governors at Queensmill School for children with autism. In 2012, he married the journalist and novelist Hermione Eyre.

== See also ==
- Shadow Cabinet of Kemi Badenoch
  - Opposition frontbench of Kemi Badenoch

== Notes ==
Parliament of the United Kingdom
Preceded by Sir Eric Pickles	Member of Parliament for Brentwood and Ongar; 2017–present	Incumbent
Political offices
Preceded by Hilary Benn	Shadow Secretary of State for Northern Ireland; 2024–present	Incumbent
Preceded by Oliver Dowden	Shadow Chancellor of the Duchy of Lancaster; 2025–present	Incumbent
Vacant Title last held by Oliver Dowden	Deputy Leader of the Opposition; 2026–present	Incumbent
Party political offices
Vacant Title last held by Michael Ancram	Deputy Leader of the Conservative Party; 2026–present	Incumbent
