= Shadow Chancellor of the Duchy of Lancaster =

Position in the British Shadow Cabinet

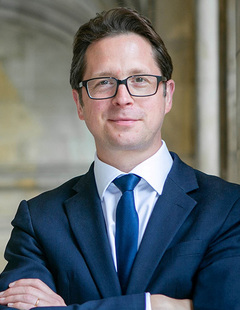
- Incumbent; Alex Burghart since 5 November 2024
- Shadow Cabinet
- Appointer: Leader of the Opposition
- Precursor: Shadow Lord President of the Council (2016-2020)
- Formation: 18 July 1992
- First holder: Mo Mowlam
- Website: The Conservative Party

The shadow chancellor of the Duchy of Lancaster is a position in the British Shadow Cabinet, appointed by the leader of the Opposition. The post involves holding to account the chancellor of the Duchy of Lancaster, who has control over the estates and rents of the Duchy of Lancaster. The position was re-established by Keir Starmer in April 2020, replacing the position of shadow lord president of the council last held by Jon Trickett, which was split from shadow leader of the House of Commons by former Labour leader Jeremy Corbyn.

== List of shadow chancellors of the Duchy of Lancaster ==
Name	Term start	Term end	Concurrent position	Political party	Shadow Cabinet
Mo Mowlam	18 July 1992	29 September 1992	Shadow Minister for the Citizen's Charter	Labour	Smith
Michael Meacher	21 October 1993	20 October 1994	Shadow Minister for the Citizen's Charter	Labour	Smith
Michael Meacher	21 October 1993	20 October 1994	Shadow Minister for the Citizen's Charter	Labour	Beckett
Ann Taylor	20 October 1994	19 October 1995	Shadow Minister for the Citizen's Charter	Labour	Blair
Derek Foster	19 October 1995	2 May 1997	Shadow Minister for the Citizen's Charter	Labour	Blair
Michael Heseltine	2 May 1997	19 June 1997	Deputy Leader of the Opposition; Shadow Secretary of State for Trade and Industry	Conservative	Major
Gillian Shephard	19 June 1997	1 June 1998	Shadow Leader of the House of Commons	Conservative	Hague
George Young	1 June 1998	15 June 1999	Shadow Leader of the House of Commons	Conservative	Hague
George Young	15 June 1999	26 September 2000	Constitutional Affairs spokesman	Conservative	Hague
Angela Browning	26 September 2000	14 September 2001	Shadow Leader of the House of Commons; Constitutional Affairs spokesman	Conservative	Hague
Eric Forth	14 September 2001	11 November 2003	Shadow Leader of the House of Commons	Conservative	Duncan Smith
Vacant	11 November 2003	8 December 2005	Vacant		
Oliver Heald	8 December 2005	2 July 2007	Shadow Secretary of State for Justice	Conservative	Cameron
Francis Maude	2 July 2007	11 May 2010	Shadow Minister for the Cabinet Office	Conservative	Cameron
Vacant	11 May 2010	5 April 2020	Vacant		
Rachel Reeves	5 April 2020	9 May 2021	Shadow Minister for the Cabinet Office	Labour	Starmer
Angela Rayner	9 May 2021	4 September 2023	Shadow Minister for the Cabinet Office; Deputy Leader of the Labour Party; Shadow First Secretary of State	Labour	Starmer
Pat McFadden	4 September 2023	5 July 2024	Labour Party National Campaign Coordinator	Labour	Starmer
Oliver Dowden	8 July 2024	5 November 2024	Shadow Deputy Prime Minister	Conservative	Sunak
Alex Burghart	5 November 2024	Incumbent	Shadow Secretary of State for Northern Ireland	Conservative	Badenoch

== See also ==
- Official Opposition frontbench
- Shadow Cabinet of Rishi Sunak
- Shadow First Secretary of State
- Shadow Minister for the Cabinet Office
