= Chancellor of the Duchy of Lancaster =

Ministerial office in the United Kingdom

United Kingdom Chancellor of the Duchy of Lancaster
- Arms of the Duchy of Lancaster

- Flag of the Duchy of Lancaster

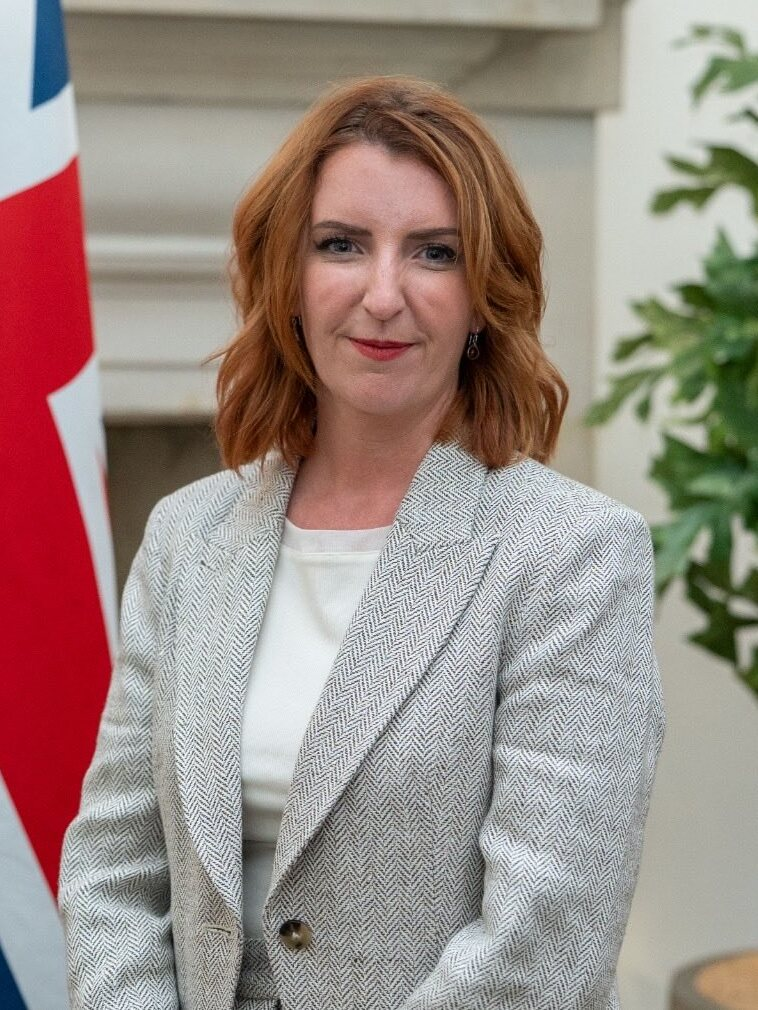
- Incumbent; Louise Haigh since 20 July 2026
- Government of the United Kingdom; Cabinet Office; Duchy of Lancaster
- Style: The Right Honourable (within the UK and Commonwealth)
- Member of: Cabinet; Privy Council; National Security Council
- Reports to: The Monarch; Prime Minister of the United Kingdom
- Nominator: Prime Minister of the United Kingdom
- Appointer: The Monarch; (on the advice of the Prime Minister)
- Term length: At His Majesty's pleasure
- Inaugural holder: Sir Henry de Haydock
- Formation: 1361
- Deputy: Paymaster General
- Salary: £159,038 per annum (2022) (including £91,346 MP salary)
- Website: gov.uk/government/ministers/chancellor-of-the-duchy-of-lancaster

The chancellor of the Duchy of Lancaster is a ministerial office in the Government of the United Kingdom. The role includes as part of its duties the administration of the estates and rents of the Duchy of Lancaster.

Formally, the chancellor of the Duchy of Lancaster is appointed by the Sovereign on the advice of the prime minister, and is answerable to Parliament for the governance of the Duchy. In modern times, however, the involvement of the chancellor in the running of the day-to-day affairs of the Duchy is slight, and the office is held by a senior politician whose main role is usually quite different. It allows the prime minister to appoint an additional minister without portfolio to the Cabinet of the United Kingdom. The corresponding shadow minister is the shadow chancellor of the Duchy of Lancaster.

The role is typically held by a close ally of the prime minister entrusted to support the delivery of their current priorities. In 2021, the role was endowed with responsibility for advising the prime minister on Brexit policy. In the Starmer ministry, the role was given responsibility for supporting delivery of the government's strategic priorities, Cabinet Office policy, cleaning up politics, and national security and resilience. In recent governments, this role has typically been given to the Prime Ministers deputy.

== History ==
Originally, the chancellor was the chief officer in the daily management of the Duchy of Lancaster and the County Palatine of Lancaster (a county palatine merged into the Crown in 1399), but that estate is now run by a deputy, leaving the chancellor as a member of the Cabinet with little obligation in regard to the chancellorship. The position has often been given to a senior Cabinet minister with responsibilities in a particular area of policy for which there is no department with an appropriate portfolio.

In 1491, the office of Vice-Chancellor of the County Palatine of Lancaster was created. The position is now held by a judge of the Chancery Division of the High Court of Justice, who sits in the north west of England, and is no longer appointed to that position as legal officer of the Duchy.

=== Modern times ===
Under the Promissory Oaths Act 1868, the chancellor is required to take the oath of allegiance and the Official Oath. The holder of the office is a minister without portfolio; Sir Oswald Mosley, for example, focused on unemployment after being appointed to the position in 1929 during the second MacDonald ministry.

Following the Dardanelles campaign, Winston Churchill was in 1915 appointed Chancellor of the Duchy of Lancaster, a humiliating loss of the trappings of power.

The chancellor of the Duchy of Lancaster is entitled to a salary under the Ministerial and Other Salaries Act 1975, but section 3 of the act provides that the salary "shall be reduced by the amount of the salary payable to him otherwise than out of moneys so provided in respect of his office". The office of the chancellor of the Duchy of Lancaster is part of the Cabinet Office.

From 1997 until 2009, the holder of the title also served as the Minister for the Cabinet Office. This applied in the case of Alan Milburn, who was given the title by Prime Minister Tony Blair in 2004 and at the same time rejoined the Cabinet. However, in the reshuffle of 5 June 2009, the chancellorship went to the Leader of the House of Lords, the Baroness Royall. In David Cameron's first cabinet, the chancellorship remained with the leader of the House of Lords until 2014.

When David Lidington was appointed chancellor on 8 January 2018, the position of Minister for the Cabinet Office was once again held concurrently. This continued until Michael Gove was appointed chancellor in July 2019. Michael Gove was given responsibility over the Cabinet Office, but did not initially hold the ministerial position of Minister for the Cabinet Office (which is not on a statutory footing). He was later granted that title in the 2020 Cabinet reshuffle and the two positions remained together until February 2022.

== Responsibilities ==
In addition to administering the estates and rents of the Duchy of Lancaster, the chancellor is also a member of the cabinet and advises the prime minister on the development and implementation of government policy. As of 2025, the Chancellor is presently responsible for:

- Missions — supporting delivery of Government's priorities
- Oversight of all Cabinet Office policy
- National security, resilience, and civil contingencies, including:
  - COBR
  - Resilience policy
  - Cyber security
  - State threats
  - National Security and Investment Act 2021
- Propriety and ethics
- Public appointments
- Major events policy

== See also ==
- County Palatine of Lancaster
- Lord Keeper of the Privy Seal
- Minister without portfolio
