= Minister for the Cabinet Office =

Senior ministerial position in the Government of the United Kingdom

United Kingdom Minister for the Cabinet Office
- Royal Arms of His Majesty's Government

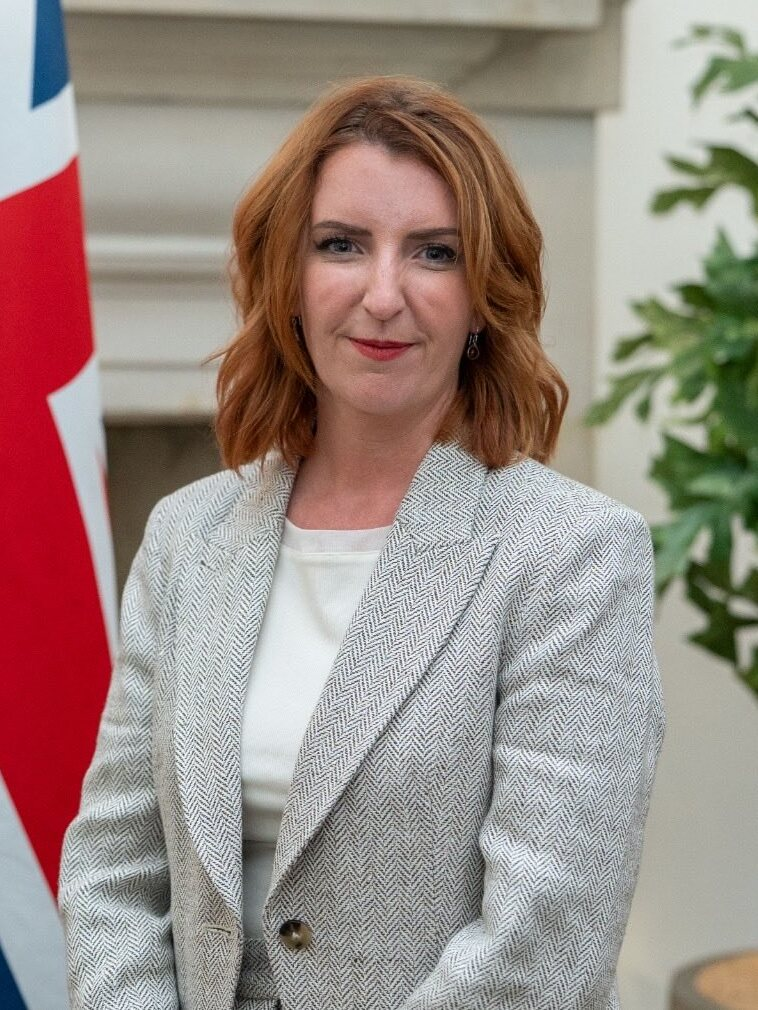
- Incumbent; Louise Haigh since 20 July 2026
- Cabinet Office
- Style: The Right Honourable (within the UK and Commonwealth)
- Type: Minister of the Crown
- Status: Minister of State
- Member of: Cabinet (attending); Privy Council
- Reports to: Prime Minister of the United Kingdom; Chancellor of the Duchy of Lancaster
- Seat: Westminster
- Nominator: Prime Minister
- Appointer: The Monarch; (on the advice of the Prime Minister)
- Term length: At His Majesty's pleasure
- Salary: £121,326 per annum (2022) (including £86,584 MP salary)
- Website: www.gov.uk/government/ministers/minister-for-the-cabinet-office

The minister for the Cabinet Office is a position in the Cabinet Office of the United Kingdom, responsible for the work and policies of the Cabinet Office.

The role has often been held concurrently with that of Chancellor of the Duchy of Lancaster (as is the case currently), making the holder the second highest ranking minister in the Cabinet Office, after the Prime Minister, and a full Cabinet member. At other times, when the Chancellor of the Duchy of Lancaster is held by a separate official (such as between 2022–2026), the Minister for the Cabinet Office is subordinate to them, ranking third in the Cabinet Office and attending Cabinet but not as a full member.

From the second May ministry until mid-2019 when the first Johnson ministry came to power, it functioned as an alternative title to Deputy Prime Minister or First Secretary of State. This practice ended when Dominic Raab was appointed as First Secretary of State on 24 July 2019, by Boris Johnson.

The corresponding shadow minister is the shadow minister for the Cabinet Office.

== Function and status ==
The Cabinet Office has a primary responsibility to support the work of the Prime Minister and ensure the effective running of government. Within this set-up, the Minister for the Cabinet Office has been seen to have varying responsibilities and stature in the government. The role is a flexible one and has variously been described as one or several of the following under different office-holders (and sometimes conflicting accounts of the status of the same office holder):

- Monitoring the co-ordination of the work of government departments
- Chairing or sitting on several Cabinet Committees
- An additional title to indicate special responsibility
- An additional title to indicate seniority

The government describes the minister for the Cabinet Office as being "in overall charge of and responsible for the policy and work of the department, and attends Cabinet".

Damian Green held the office in 2017, simultaneously with the office of First Secretary of State. Green chaired numerous Cabinet Committees and filled in for the Prime Minister at Prime Minister's Questions. By virtue of his responsibilities and as First Secretary of State, he was considered the de facto Deputy Prime Minister. Upon the appointment of David Lidington in 2018, Lidington retained the responsibilities Green had held, but the title of First Secretary of State remained vacant (as did the office of Deputy Prime Minister) until 2019.

As a result, the office between 2017–2019 absorbed the responsibilities of a de facto Deputy Prime Minister, without either of the associated titles usually granted to individuals in the British Government (First Secretary of State or Deputy Prime Minister). In 2019, new Prime Minister Boris Johnson ended this arrangement with the appointment of a new First Secretary of State, Dominic Raab, before upgrading his title again to Deputy Prime Minister in 2021.

== Current minister and responsibilities ==
Louise Haigh has served as the Minister for the Cabinet Office since the 20th of July 2026. She also serves as Chancellor of the Duchy of Lancaster and First Secretary of State alongside her position.

The most recent responsibilities are:

- Oversight of all Cabinet Office policy and appointments
- Oversight of transition period activity and the United Kingdom's future relations with the EU
- Devolution issues and Strengthening the Union
- Leading cross-government and public sector transformation and efficiency
- Oversight of cross-government work on veterans' issues
- Oversight of Cabinet Office responsibilities on National Security and resilience, and the Civil Contingencies Secretariat, including COVID-19
- Supporting the coordination of the cross-government and the devolution aspects of the response to COVID-19

== Ministers for the Cabinet Office ==
Every occupant of the position has simultaneously held one or more sinecure offices, either as Chancellor of the Duchy of Lancaster, Paymaster General, or First Secretary of State. The incumbent Louise Haigh holds both the role of First Secretary of State and Chancellor of the Duchy of Lancaster.

Minister	Term of office		Concurrent office	Party	Prime Minister
David Clark	2 May 1997	27 July 1998	Chancellor of the Duchy of Lancaster	Labour	Blair
Jack Cunningham	27 July 1998	11 October 1999	Chancellor of the Duchy of Lancaster	Labour	Blair
Mo Mowlam	11 October 1999	7 June 2001	Chancellor of the Duchy of Lancaster	Labour	Blair
Gus Macdonald, Baron Macdonald of Tradeston	11 June 2001	13 June 2003	Chancellor of the Duchy of Lancaster	Labour	Blair
Douglas Alexander	13 June 2003	8 September 2004	Chancellor of the Duchy of Lancaster	Labour	Blair
Alan Milburn	8 September 2004	6 May 2005	Chancellor of the Duchy of Lancaster	Labour	Blair
John Hutton	6 May 2005	2 November 2005	Chancellor of the Duchy of Lancaster	Labour	Blair
Jim Murphy (acting)	5 November 2005	5 May 2006	Chancellor of the Duchy of Lancaster	Labour	Blair
Hilary Armstrong	5 May 2006	28 June 2007	Chancellor of the Duchy of Lancaster	Labour	Blair
Ed Miliband	28 June 2007	3 October 2008	Chancellor of the Duchy of Lancaster	Labour	Brown
Liam Byrne	3 October 2008	5 June 2009	Chancellor of the Duchy of Lancaster	Labour	Brown
Tessa Jowell	5 June 2009	11 May 2010	Paymaster General	Labour	Brown
Francis Maude	12 May 2010	11 May 2015	Paymaster General	Conservative	Cameron (Coalition)
Matt Hancock	11 May 2015	14 July 2016	Paymaster General	Conservative	Cameron (II)
Ben Gummer	14 July 2016	11 June 2017	Paymaster General	Conservative	May
Damian Green	11 June 2017	20 December 2017	First Secretary of State	Conservative	May
David Lidington	8 January 2018	24 July 2019	Chancellor of the Duchy of Lancaster	Conservative	May
Oliver Dowden	24 July 2019	13 February 2020	Paymaster General	Conservative	Johnson
Michael Gove	13 February 2020	15 September 2021	Chancellor of the Duchy of Lancaster	Conservative	Johnson
Steve Barclay	15 September 2021	8 February 2022	Chancellor of the Duchy of Lancaster	Conservative	Johnson
Michael Ellis	8 February 2022	6 September 2022	Paymaster General	Conservative	Johnson
Edward Argar	6 September 2022	14 October 2022	Paymaster General	Conservative	Truss
Chris Philp	14 October 2022	25 October 2022	Paymaster General	Conservative	Truss
Jeremy Quin	25 October 2022	13 November 2023	Paymaster General	Conservative	Sunak
John Glen	13 November 2023	5 July 2024	Paymaster General	Conservative	Sunak
Nick Thomas-Symonds	8 July 2024	20 July 2026	Paymaster General; Minister for the Constitution and European Union Relations	Labour	Starmer
Louise Haigh	20 July 2026	Incumbent	Chancellor of the Duchy of Lancaster; First Secretary of State	Labour	Burnham

== Ministers of State at the Cabinet Office ==
Minister of State for the Cabinet Office

- 1997: Derek Foster
- 1997–1999: Peter Kilfoyle
- 1998–2001: Charlie Falconer, Baron Falconer of Thoroton
- 1999–2001: Ian McCartney
- 2001: Sally Morgan, Baroness Morgan of Huyton
- 2001–2002: Barbara Roche
- 2002–2003: Douglas Alexander
- 2004–2005: David Miliband

Minister Assisting the Deputy Prime Minister

- 2012–2015: David Laws

Minister of State in the Cabinet Office

- 2020–2022: Nicholas True, Baron True
- 2021–2022: Alok Sharma (President for COP26)
- 2021: David Frost, Baron Frost (Minister of State for EU Relations)
- 2022–2024: Lucy Neville-Rolfe, Baroness Neville-Rolfe
- 2024: Steve Baker (with responsibility for Windsor Framework implementation)
- 2025–2026: Dan Jarvis
- 2026: Angela Eagle
- 2026–present: Dan Jarvis

Minister of State at the Cabinet Office

- 2025: Douglas Alexander
