= Jenny Chapman =

British politician and life peer (born 1973)

The Right Honourable The Baroness Chapman of Darlington PC
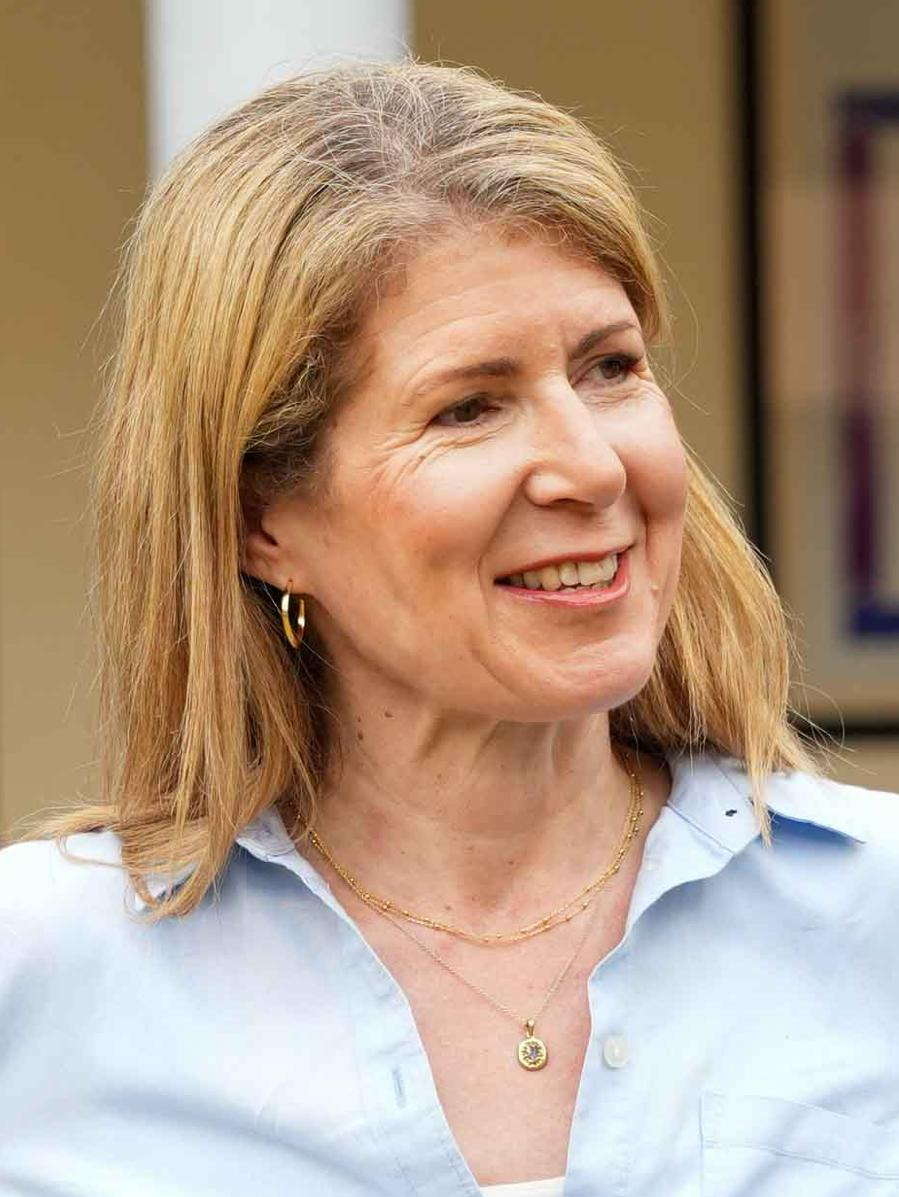
- Chapman in 2026

Minister of State for International Development and Africa
- In office 28 February 2025 – 20 July 2026
- Prime Minister: Keir Starmer
- Preceded by: Anneliese Dodds
- Succeeded by: Kirsty McNeill

Parliamentary Under-Secretary of State for Latin America and Caribbean
- In office 18 July 2024 – 28 February 2025
- Prime Minister: Keir Starmer
- Preceded by: David Rutley
- Succeeded by: Chris Elmore

Member of the House of Lords
- Lord Temporal
- Life peerage 1 February 2021

Member of Parliament for Darlington
- In office 6 May 2010 – 6 November 2019
- Preceded by: Alan Milburn
- Succeeded by: Peter Gibson
Shadow portfolios
2023–2024	Treasury
2021–2024	Minister of State at the Cabinet Office
2023–2023	Business and Trade
2022–2023	Education
2021–2023	Justice
2021–2022	International Trade, Whip
2016–2019	Exiting the European Union
2016–2016	Children and Early Years
2011–2016	Prisons

Member of Darlington Council for Cockerton West
- In office 3 May 2007 – May 2010
- Succeeded by: Jan Cossins

Personal details
- Born: 25 September 1973 (age 52) Surrey, England
- Party: Labour
- Spouse(s): Tony Chapman (m. 2002–2014) Nick Smith (m. 2014)
- Children: 2
- Education: Brunel University (BSc); Durham University (MA)

Jennifer Chapman, Baroness Chapman of Darlington (born 25 September 1973) is a British politician and life peer who served as Minister of State for International Development, Latin America and Caribbean from February 2025 to July 2026. She previously served as Parliamentary Under-Secretary of State for Latin America and Caribbean from 2024 to 2025. A member of the Labour Party, she served as Member of Parliament (MP) for Darlington from 2010 to 2019.

Chapman was political secretary to the Leader of the Opposition, Keir Starmer, from 2020 to 2021. She was made Baroness Chapman of Darlington in February 2021,

As Shadow Minister of State at the Cabinet Office from 2021 to 2023, she served as a member of the shadow cabinet. She was appointed Chancellor of Teesside University in 2023.

== Early life and career ==
Chapman was born in September 1973 in Surrey but moved at a young age to Darlington, where she attended Hummersknott School and Queen Elizabeth Sixth Form College. She completed a Bachelor of Science in psychology at Brunel University in 1996, and later took an MA in archaeology at Durham University in 2004. She had work placements attached to prison psychology departments whilst studying for her undergraduate degree.

== Political career ==
=== Councillor ===
Chapman worked as constituency office manager for Darlington Labour MP Alan Milburn. After a career break to have children, she returned to politics at Darlington Borough Council when she was elected as borough councillor for the Cockerton West ward in 2007.

=== House of Commons ===
In November 2009, Chapman was shortlisted as one of four candidates to succeed Milburn as Labour's parliamentary candidate for Darlington on an open shortlist, i.e. not an all-women shortlist. She was selected to stand for parliament by the local constituency party the following month. She was elected Darlington MP in the 2010 general election with a majority of 3,388. As a result of her election victory, she decided to stand down as a councillor.

In 2011, Chapman was appointed as Shadow Minister for Prisons. She had previously written policy recommendations on the subject of incarceration, including a recommendation that prison officers should receive training to help them rehabilitate inmates. She became Shadow Minister for Childcare and Early Years in January 2016, but resigned in June of the same year among dozens of Labour frontbench colleagues. Chapman campaigned to remain in the European Union in the 2016 EU membership referendum.

She supported Owen Smith in the failed attempt to replace Jeremy Corbyn in the subsequent leadership election held in 2016. She later rejoined the Opposition frontbench as Shadow Minister for Exiting the European Union.

Chapman was one of the many Labour MPs to be defeated at the 2019 general election, losing her seat to Conservative Peter Gibson following 27 years of Labour holding the constituency.

During her time as an MP, she served as a vice-chair of Progress.

After losing her seat, she became chair of Keir Starmer's successful campaign in the 2020 Labour Party leadership election and later accepted the role of political secretary to Starmer in his role as Leader of the Labour Party.

=== House of Lords ===
In December 2020 it was announced that Chapman would join the House of Lords as part of the 2020 Political Honours. In February 2021, she was made Baroness Chapman of Darlington, of Darlington in the County of Durham.

Chapman was removed as Starmer's political director in June 2021, after what The Times referred to as "months of friction" with Labour MPs, and was re-appointed to the frontbench as Shadow Minister for the Cabinet Office, shadowing Lord Frost at Task Force Europe and the Cabinet Office.

Chapman was made Minister of State for International Development, Latin America and Caribbean on 28 February 2025, and appointed to the Privy Council in May that year.

== Personal life ==
Chapman married fellow Labour MP Nick Smith in July 2014. She has two sons from a previous marriage.

In February 2022, Chapman won a libel case against The Sunday Times chief political commentator Tim Shipman. Shipman's May 2021 tweets falsely suggested Chapman had a "secret adulterous relationship" with Labour leader Keir Starmer. Chapman received substantial damages and legal costs.

In August 2023, Chapman was announced as the Chancellor of Teesside University.

Parliament of the United Kingdom
Preceded by Alan Milburn	Member of Parliament for Darlington; 2010–2019	Succeeded by Peter Gibson
Political offices
Preceded by Angela Rayner	Shadow Minister for the Cabinet Office; 2021–2024	Succeeded by Lucy Neville-Rolfe, Baroness Neville-Rolfe
