= Deputy Leader of the Opposition (United Kingdom) =

Senior Member of the Shadow Cabinet

Deputy Leader of His Majesty's Most Loyal Opposition
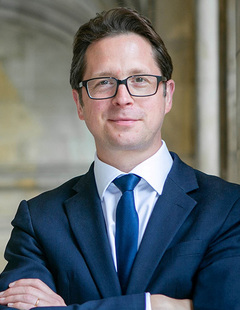
- Incumbent; Alex Burghart since 1 September 2026
- Appointer: Leader of the Opposition
- First holder: Unknown (Note: as Deputy Leader of the Opposition); William Hague (Note: as Senior Member of the Shadow Cabinet); Harriet Harman (Note: as Shadow Deputy Prime Minister of the United Kingdom); Angela Eagle (Note: as Shadow First Secretary of State)
- Website: Shadow Cabinet

The Deputy Leader of His Majesty’s Most Loyal Opposition, or more commonly known as Deputy Leader of the Opposition, is a position in the United Kingdom's Shadow Cabinet. From 2005 to 2010, the office was known as Senior Member of the Shadow Cabinet, and from 2015 to 2023, the office was known as Shadow First Secretary of State. From 2010 to 2015 and again from 2023 to 2024, the office was known as Shadow Deputy Prime Minister.

Even though the role has no specific responsibilities attached to it, the holder of the position shadows the First Secretary of State and/or Deputy Prime Minister of the United Kingdom and deputises for the Leader of the Opposition in Prime Minister's Questions when the First Secretary or Deputy PM is deputising for the Prime Minister.

The position remained vacant from 5 November 2024 until 1 September 2026, when Alex Burghart was appointed to the position by Kemi Badenoch.

== List of Deputy Leaders of the Opposition ==
=== Deputy Leader of the Opposition ===
Deputy Leader	Term of Office		Concurrent position	Political Party	Leader of the Opposition
Vacant	6 December 1916 (Note: Asquith does not appear to have appointed a formal deputy however it appears that Reginald McKenna, Herbert Samuel and Walter Runciman served as de facto deputy leaders.)	14 December 1918		Liberal	H. H. Asquith
Unknown	14 December 1918	25 February 1920		Liberal	Donald Maclean
Donald Maclean	25 February 1920	15 November 1922	Deputy Leader of the Liberal Party	Liberal	H. H. Asquith
Stephen Walsh	15 November 1922	22 November 1922	Deputy Leader of the Labour Party	Labour	J. R. Clynes
J. R. Clynes	22 November 1922	22 January 1924	Deputy Leader of the Labour Party	Labour	Ramsay MacDonald
Unknown	22 January 1924	4 November 1924		Conservative	Stanley Baldwin
J. R. Clynes	4 November 1924	4 June 1929	Deputy Leader of the Labour Party	Labour	Ramsay MacDonald
Unknown	4 June 1929	24 August 1931		Conservative	Stanley Baldwin
J. R. Clynes	24 August 1931	27 October 1931	Deputy Leader of the Labour Party	Labour	Arthur Henderson
Unknown	27 October 1931	5 November 1931		Labour	Unknown (Note: Labour leader Henderson and deputy leader Clynes lost their seats in the House of Commons on 27 October 1931.)
Clement Attlee	5 November 1931	8 October 1935	Deputy Leader of the Labour Party (1932–1935)	Labour	George Lansbury
Vacant	8 October 1935	26 November 1935		Labour	Clement Attlee
Arthur Greenwood	26 November 1935	22 May 1940	Deputy Leader of the Labour Party	Labour	Clement Attlee
Unknown	22 May 1940	22 February 1942		Labour	Hastings Lees-Smith
Unknown	22 May 1940	22 February 1942		Labour	Frederick Pethick-Lawrence
Frederick Pethick-Lawrence	22 February 1942	23 May 1945		Labour	Arthur Greenwood
Arthur Greenwood	23 May 1945	26 July 1945	Deputy Leader of the Labour Party	Labour	Clement Attlee
Anthony Eden	26 July 1945	26 October 1951	Shadow Foreign Secretary	Conservative	Winston Churchill
Oliver Stanley; Acting	January 1949	March 1949	Shadow Chancellor of the Exchequer	Conservative	Winston Churchill
Herbert Morrison	26 October 1951	25 November 1955	Deputy Leader of the Labour Party	Labour	Clement Attlee
Vacant	25 November 1955	2 February 1956		Labour	Herbert Morrison
Vacant	25 November 1955	2 February 1956		Labour	Hugh Gaitskell
Jim Griffiths	2 February 1956	24 October 1959	Deputy Leader of the Labour Party	Labour	Hugh Gaitskell
Aneurin Bevan	24 October 1959	6 July 1960	Deputy Leader of the Labour Party; Shadow Foreign Secretary	Labour	Hugh Gaitskell
Vacant	6 July 1960	10 November 1960		Labour	Hugh Gaitskell
George Brown	10 November 1960	18 January 1963	Deputy Leader of the Labour Party; Shadow Minister of Defence (1960–1962); Shadow Home Secretary (1962–1963)	Labour	Hugh Gaitskell
Vacant	18 January 1963	14 February 1963		Labour	George Brown
George Brown	14 February 1963	16 October 1964	Deputy Leader of the Labour Party; Shadow Home Secretary	Labour	Harold Wilson
Unknown	16 October 1964	29 October 1964		Conservative	Alec Douglas-Home
Reginald Maudling	29 October 1964	20 June 1970	Shadow Chancellor of the Exchequer (1964–1965); Shadow Foreign Secretary (1965); Deputy Leader of the Conservative Party (1965–1970); Shadow Secretary of State for Commonwealth Affairs (1966–1968); Shadow Secretary of State for Defence (1968)	Conservative	Alec Douglas-Home
Reginald Maudling	29 October 1964	20 June 1970	Shadow Chancellor of the Exchequer (1964–1965); Shadow Foreign Secretary (1965); Deputy Leader of the Conservative Party (1965–1970); Shadow Secretary of State for Commonwealth Affairs (1966–1968); Shadow Secretary of State for Defence (1968)	Conservative	Edward Heath
Vacant	20 June 1970	8 July 1970		Labour	Harold Wilson
Roy Jenkins	8 July 1970	10 April 1972	Deputy Leader of the Labour Party; Shadow Chancellor of the Exchequer	Labour	Harold Wilson
Vacant	10 April 1972	25 April 1972		Labour	Harold Wilson
Edward Short	25 April 1972	4 March 1974	Deputy Leader of the Labour Party; Shadow Secretary of State for Education and Science (1972); Shadow Leader of the House of Commons (1972–1974)	Labour	Harold Wilson
Vacant	4 March 1974	12 March 1974		Conservative	Edward Heath
Robert Carr	12 March 1974	11 February 1975	Shadow Chancellor of the Exchequer	Conservative	Edward Heath
William Whitelaw	11 February 1975	4 May 1979	Deputy Leader of the Conservative Party; Shadow Home Secretary (1976–1979)	Conservative	Margaret Thatcher
Michael Foot	4 May 1979	13 November 1980	Deputy Leader of the Labour Party; Shadow Leader of the House of Commons	Labour	James Callaghan
Denis Healey	13 November 1980	2 October 1983	Deputy Leader of the Labour Party; Shadow Foreign Secretary	Labour	Michael Foot
Roy Hattersley	2 October 1983	18 July 1992	Deputy Leader of the Labour Party; Shadow Chancellor of the Exchequer (1983–1987); Shadow Home Secretary (1987–1992)	Labour	Neil Kinnock
Margaret Beckett	18 July 1992	12 May 1994	Deputy Leader of the Labour Party; Shadow Leader of the House of Commons	Labour	John Smith
Vacant	12 May 1994	21 July 1994		Labour	Margaret Beckett
John Prescott	21 July 1994	2 May 1997	Deputy Leader of the Labour Party	Labour	Tony Blair
Michael Heseltine	2 May 1997	19 June 1997	Shadow Secretary of State for Trade and Industry; Shadow Chancellor of the Duchy of Lancaster	Conservative	John Major
Vacant	19 June 1997	1 June 1998		Conservative	William Hague
Peter Lilley	1 June 1998	15 June 1999	Deputy Leader of the Conservative Party	Conservative	William Hague
Vacant	15 June 1999	1 February 2000		Conservative	William Hague
Michael Portillo	1 February 2000	18 September 2001	Shadow Chancellor of the Exchequer	Conservative	William Hague
Michael Ancram	18 September 2001	6 December 2005	Deputy Leader of the Conservative Party; Shadow Foreign Secretary (2001–2005); Shadow Secretary of State for Defence (2005)	Conservative	Iain Duncan Smith; Michael Howard
=== Senior Member of the Shadow Cabinet ===
Senior Member	Term of Office		Concurrent position	Political Party	Leader of the Opposition
William Hague	6 December 2005	11 May 2010	Shadow Foreign Secretary	Conservative	David Cameron
=== Shadow Deputy Prime Minister of the United Kingdom ===
Shadow Deputy Prime Minister	Term of Office		Concurrent position	Political Party	Leader of the Opposition
Jack Straw; Acting	11 May 2010	25 September 2010	Shadow Secretary of State for Justice; Shadow Lord Chancellor	Labour	Harriet Harman
Harriet Harman	7 October 2010	8 May 2015	Deputy Leader of the Labour Party; Chair of the Labour Party; Shadow Secretary of State for International Development (2010–2011); Shadow Secretary of State for Culture, Media and Sport (2011–2015)	Labour	Ed Miliband
=== Shadow First Secretary of State ===
Shadow First Secretary	Term of Office		Concurrent position	Political Party	Leader of the Opposition
Hilary Benn; Acting	11 May 2015	13 September 2015	Shadow Foreign Secretary	Labour	Harriet Harman
Angela Eagle	13 September 2015	27 June 2016	Shadow Secretary of State for Business, Innovation and Skills	Labour	Jeremy Corbyn
Office not in use from June 2016 to June 2017.					Jeremy Corbyn
Emily Thornberry	14 June 2017	5 April 2020	Shadow Foreign Secretary	Labour	Jeremy Corbyn
Angela Rayner	9 April 2020	4 September 2023	Deputy Leader of the Labour Party; Chair of the Labour Party (2020–2021); Shadow Chancellor of the Duchy of Lancaster (2021–2023); Shadow Minister for the Cabinet Office (2021–2023); Shadow Secretary of State for the Future of Work (2021–2023)	Labour	Keir Starmer
=== Shadow Deputy Prime Minister of the United Kingdom ===
Deputy Leader of the Opposition	Term of Office		Concurrent position	Political Party	Leader of the Opposition
Angela Rayner	4 September 2023	5 July 2024	Shadow Secretary of State for Levelling Up, Housing and Communities	Labour	Keir Starmer
Oliver Dowden	5 July 2024	5 November 2024	Shadow Chancellor of the Duchy of Lancaster	Conservative	Rishi Sunak
Vacant (Note: Kemi Badenoch initially did not appoint a formal deputy however a number of frontbenchers stood in for her during this time including Alex Burghart (Shadow Chancellor of the Duchy of Lancaster), Chris Philp (Shadow Home Secretary), Mel Stride (Shadow Chancellor of the Exchequer), James Cartlidge (Shadow Defence Secretary), Andrew Griffith (Shadow Business Secretary), Claire Coutinho (Shadow Energy Secretary) and James Cleverly (Shadow Communities Secretary))	5 November 2024	31 August 2026			Kemi Badenoch
=== Deputy Leader of the Opposition ===
Deputy Leader of the Opposition	Term of Office		Concurrent position	Political Party	Leader of the Opposition
Alex Burghart	31 August 2026	Incumbent	Deputy Leader of the Conservative Party; Shadow Chancellor of the Duchy of Lancaster; Shadow Secretary of State for Northern Ireland	Conservative	Kemi Badenoch

== See also ==
- Official Opposition frontbench
- Shadow Cabinet of Kemi Badenoch
- Shadow Chancellor of the Duchy of Lancaster
- Shadow Minister for the Cabinet Office
