= Corbyn shadow cabinet =

UK shadow cabinet from 2015 to 2020

Corbyn Shadow Cabinet
- Shadow Cabinet of the United Kingdom
- 2015 – 2020
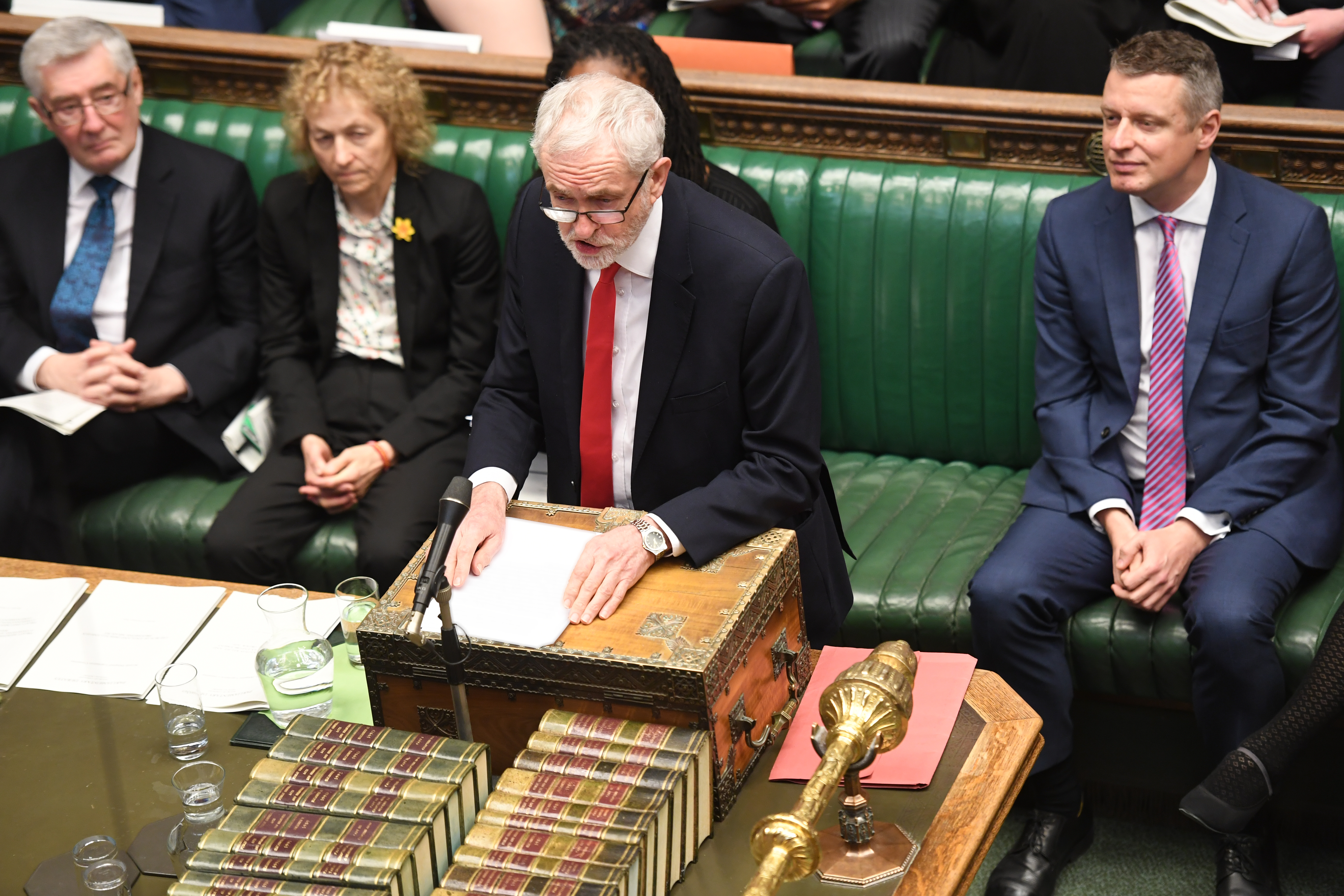
- Corbyn and members of his shadow cabinet at a session of Prime Minister's Questions in 2020
- Date formed: 12 September 2015
- Date dissolved: 4 April 2020

People and organisations
- Monarch: Elizabeth II
- Leader of the Opposition: Jeremy Corbyn
- Shadow First Secretary: Angela Eagle (2015–16); Emily Thornberry (2017–20)
- Member party: Labour Party
- Status in legislature: Official Opposition

History
- Elections: 2015; 2016
- Outgoing election: 2020
- Legislature terms: 2015 UK Parliament; 2017 UK Parliament; 2019 UK Parliament
- Predecessor: Second Harman shadow cabinet
- Successor: Starmer shadow cabinet

Jeremy Corbyn assumed the position of Leader of the Opposition after being elected as leader of the Labour Party on 12 September 2015; the election was triggered by Ed Miliband's resignation following the Labour Party's electoral defeat at the 2015 general election when David Cameron formed a majority Conservative government. The usual number of junior shadow ministers were also appointed.

Corbyn appointed his first Shadow Cabinet in September 2015. A small reshuffle occurred on 5 January 2016, with one further resignation on 11 January 2016. Dozens of further resignations occurred on 26 and 27 June 2016.

The cabinet was reshuffled following the 2017 and 2019 general elections.

== Shadow Cabinet ==
=== September 2015 – January 2016 ===
Sits in the House of Commons
Sits in the House of Lords

Portfolio	Shadow Minister	Constituency	Term
Leader of the Opposition; Leader of the Labour Party	Jeremy Corbyn	Islington North	Sep 2015 – Apr 2020
Deputy Leader of the Labour Party	Tom Watson	West Bromwich East	Sep 2015 – Dec 2019
Chair of the Labour Party	Tom Watson	West Bromwich East	Sep 2015 – June 2017
Shadow Minister for the Cabinet Office	Tom Watson	West Bromwich East	Sep 2015 – Oct 2016
Shadow First Secretary of State; Shadow Secretary of State for Business, Innovation and Skills	Angela Eagle	Wallasey	Sep 2015 – June 2016
Shadow Chancellor of the Exchequer	John McDonnell	Hayes and Harlington	Sep 2015 – Apr 2020
Shadow Chief Secretary to the Treasury	Seema Malhotra	Feltham and Heston	Sep 2015 – June 2016
Shadow Foreign Secretary	Hilary Benn	Leeds Central	May 2015 – June 2016
Shadow Home Secretary	Andy Burnham	Leigh	Sep 2015 – Oct 2016
Shadow Secretary of State for Health	Heidi Alexander	Lewisham East	Sep 2015 – June 2016
Shadow Secretary of State for Education	Lucy Powell	Manchester Central	Sep 2015 – June 2016
Shadow Secretary of State for Work and Pensions	Owen Smith	Pontypridd	Sep 2015 – June 2016
Shadow Secretary of State for Defence	Maria Eagle	Garston and Halewood	Sep 2015 – Jan 2016
Shadow Lord Chancellor; Shadow Secretary of State for Justice	Charlie Falconer	Life peer	May 2015 – June 2016
Shadow Secretary of State for Communities and Local Government; Shadow Minister for the Constitutional Convention	Jon Trickett	Hemsworth	Sep 2015 – June 2016
Shadow Secretary of State for Energy and Climate Change	Lisa Nandy	Wigan	Sep 2015 – June 2016
Shadow Secretary of State for Transport	Lilian Greenwood	Nottingham South	Sep 2015 – June 2016
Shadow Secretary of State for International Development	Diane Abbott	Hackney North and Stoke Newington	Sep 2015 – June 2016
Shadow Secretary of State for Northern Ireland	Vernon Coaker	Gedling	Sep 2015 – June 2016
Shadow Secretary of State for Scotland	Ian Murray	Edinburgh South	May 2015 – June 2016
Shadow Secretary of State for Wales	Nia Griffith	Llanelli	Sep 2015 – June 2016
Shadow Secretary of State for Environment, Food and Rural Affairs	Kerry McCarthy	Bristol East	Sep 2015 – June 2016
Shadow Minister for Women and Equalities	Kate Green	Stretford and Urmston	Sep 2015 – June 2016
Shadow Secretary of State for Culture, Media and Sport	Michael Dugher	Barnsley East	Sep 2015 – Jan 2016
Shadow Minister for Young People and Voter Registration	Gloria De Piero	Ashfield	Sep 2015 – June 2016
Shadow Minister for Mental Health	Luciana Berger	Liverpool Wavertree	Sep 2015 – June 2016
Shadow Minister for Housing and Planning	John Healey	Wentworth and Dearne	Sep 2015 – June 2016
Shadow Minister without Portfolio	Jonathan Ashworth	Leicester South	Sep 2015 – Oct 2016
Shadow Attorney General for England and Wales	Catherine McKinnell	Newcastle North	Sep 2015 – Jan 2016
Shadow Leader of the House of Commons	Chris Bryant	Rhondda	Sep 2015 – June 2016
Opposition Chief Whip in the House of Commons	Rosie Winterton	Doncaster Central	Oct 2010 – Oct 2016
Shadow Leader of the House of Lords	Angela Smith	Life peer	May 2015 – July 2024
Opposition Chief Whip in the House of Lords	Steve Bassam	Life peer	May 2010 – Jan 2018
Leader of the European Parliamentary Labour Party	Glenis Willmott	MEP for East Midlands	Jan 2009 – Oct 2017

=== January – June 2016 ===
Sits in the House of Commons
Sits in the House of Lords

Portfolio	Shadow Minister	Constituency	Term
Leader of the Opposition; Leader of the Labour Party	Jeremy Corbyn	Islington North	Sep 2015 – Apr 2020
Deputy Leader of the Labour Party	Tom Watson	West Bromwich East	Sep 2015 – Dec 2019
Chair of the Labour Party	Tom Watson	West Bromwich East	Sep 2015 – June 2017
Shadow Minister for the Cabinet Office	Tom Watson	West Bromwich East	Sep 2015 – Oct 2016
Shadow First Secretary of State; Shadow Secretary of State for Business, Innovation and Skills	Angela Eagle	Wallasey	Sep 2015 – June 2016
Shadow Chancellor of the Exchequer	John McDonnell	Hayes and Harlington	Sep 2015 – Apr 2020
Shadow Chief Secretary to the Treasury	Seema Malhotra	Feltham and Heston	Sep 2015 – June 2016
Shadow Foreign Secretary	Hilary Benn	Leeds Central	May 2015 – June 2016
Shadow Home Secretary	Andy Burnham	Leigh	Sep 2015 – Oct 2016
Shadow Secretary of State for Health	Heidi Alexander	Lewisham East	Sep 2015 – June 2016
Shadow Secretary of State for Education	Lucy Powell	Manchester Central	Sep 2015 – June 2016
Shadow Secretary of State for Work and Pensions	Owen Smith	Pontypridd	Sep 2015 – June 2016
Shadow Secretary of State for Defence	Emily Thornberry	Islington South and Finsbury	Jan – June 2016
Shadow Lord Chancellor; Shadow Secretary of State for Justice	Charlie Falconer	Life peer	May 2015 – June 2016
Shadow Secretary of State for Communities and Local Government; Shadow Minister for the Constitutional Convention	Jon Trickett	Hemsworth	Sep 2015 – June 2016
Shadow Secretary of State for Energy and Climate Change	Lisa Nandy	Wigan	Sep 2015 – June 2016
Shadow Secretary of State for Transport	Lilian Greenwood	Nottingham South	Sep 2015 – June 2016
Shadow Secretary of State for International Development	Diane Abbott	Hackney North and Stoke Newington	Sep 2015 – June 2016
Shadow Secretary of State for Northern Ireland	Vernon Coaker	Gedling	Sep 2015 – June 2016
Shadow Secretary of State for Scotland	Ian Murray	Edinburgh South	May 2015 – June 2016
Shadow Secretary of State for Wales	Nia Griffith	Llanelli	Sep 2015 – June 2016
Shadow Secretary of State for Environment, Food and Rural Affairs	Kerry McCarthy	Bristol East	Sep 2015 – June 2016
Shadow Minister for Women and Equalities	Kate Green	Stretford and Urmston	Sep 2015 – June 2016
Shadow Secretary of State for Culture, Media and Sport	Maria Eagle	Garston and Halewood	Jan – June 2016
Shadow Minister for Young People and Voter Registration	Gloria De Piero	Ashfield	Sep 2015 – June 2016
Shadow Minister for Mental Health	Luciana Berger	Liverpool Wavertree	Sep 2015 – June 2016
Shadow Minister for Housing and Planning	John Healey	Wentworth and Dearne	Sep 2015 – June 2016
Shadow Minister without Portfolio	Jonathan Ashworth	Leicester South	Sep 2015 – Oct 2016
Shadow Attorney General for England and Wales	Karl Turner	Kingston upon Hull East	Jan – June 2016
Shadow Leader of the House of Commons	Chris Bryant	Rhondda	Sep 2015 – June 2016
Opposition Chief Whip in the House of Commons	Rosie Winterton	Doncaster Central	Oct 2010 – Oct 2016
Shadow Leader of the House of Lords	Angela Smith	Life peer	May 2015 – July 2024
Opposition Chief Whip in the House of Lords	Steve Bassam	Life peer	May 2010 – Jan 2018
Leader of the European Parliamentary Labour Party	Glenis Willmott	MEP for East Midlands	Jan 2009 – Oct 2017

=== June – October 2016 ===
Sits in the House of Commons
Sits in the House of Lords

Portfolio	Shadow Minister	Constituency	Term
Leader of the Opposition; Leader of the Labour Party	Jeremy Corbyn	Islington North	Sep 2015 – Apr 2020
Deputy Leader of the Labour Party	Tom Watson	West Bromwich East	Sep 2015 – Dec 2019
Chair of the Labour Party	Tom Watson	West Bromwich East	Sep 2015 – June 2017
Shadow Minister for the Cabinet Office	Tom Watson	West Bromwich East	Sep 2015 – Oct 2016
Shadow Chancellor of the Exchequer	John McDonnell	Hayes and Harlington	Sep 2015 – Apr 2020
Shadow Chief Secretary to the Treasury	Rebecca Long-Bailey	Salford and Eccles	June 2016 – Feb 2017
Shadow Foreign Secretary	Emily Thornberry	Islington South and Finsbury	June 2016 – April 2020
Shadow Secretary of State for Exiting the European Union	Emily Thornberry	Islington South and Finsbury	July – Oct 2016
Shadow Home Secretary	Andy Burnham	Leigh	Sep 2015 – Oct 2016
Shadow Lord President of the Council	Jon Trickett	Hemsworth	June 2016 – April 2020
Shadow Secretary of State for Business, Innovation and Skills	Jon Trickett	Hemsworth	July 2016
Shadow Secretary of State for Business, Energy and Industrial Strategy	Jon Trickett	Hemsworth	July – October 2016
Shadow Secretary of State for Health	Diane Abbott	Hackney North and Stoke Newington	June – Oct 2016
Shadow Secretary of State for Education	Pat Glass	North West Durham	June 2016
Shadow Secretary of State for Education	Angela Rayner	Ashton-under-Lyne	July 2016 – April 2020
Shadow Minister for Women and Equalities	Angela Rayner	Ashton-under-Lyne	July – Oct 2016
Shadow Secretary of State for Work and Pensions	Debbie Abrahams	Oldham East and Saddleworth	June 2016 – March 2018
Shadow Secretary of State for Defence	Clive Lewis	Norwich South	June – Oct 2016
Shadow Lord Chancellor; Shadow Secretary of State for Justice	Richard Burgon	Leeds East	June 2016 – April 2020
Shadow Secretary of State for Communities and Local Government; Shadow Minister for the Constitutional Convention	Grahame Morris	Easington	June – Oct 2016
Shadow Secretary of State for Energy and Climate Change	Barry Gardiner	Brent North	June – July 2016
Shadow Secretary of State for International Trade; Shadow Minister for Energy and Climate Change	Barry Gardiner	Brent North	July 2016 – April 2020
Shadow Secretary of State for Transport	Andy McDonald	Middlesbrough	June 2016 – April 2020
Shadow Secretary of State for International Development	Kate Osamor	Edmonton	June 2016 – Dec 2018
Shadow Secretary of State for Northern Ireland	Dave Anderson	Blaydon	June 2016 – June 2017
Shadow Secretary of State for Scotland	Dave Anderson	Blaydon	July 2016 – June 2017
Shadow Secretary of State for Wales	Paul Flynn	Newport West	July – Oct 2016
Shadow Leader of the House of Commons	Paul Flynn	Newport West	July – Oct 2016
Shadow Secretary of State for Environment, Food and Rural Affairs	Rachael Maskell	York Central	June 2016 – Feb 2017
Shadow Secretary of State for Culture, Media and Sport	Kelvin Hopkins	Luton North	June – October 2016
Shadow Minister for Voter Engagement and Youth Affairs	Cat Smith	Lancaster and Fleetwood	June 2016 – Nov 2021
Shadow Minister for Mental Health	vacant		
Shadow Minister for Housing and Planning	vacant		
Shadow Minister without Portfolio	Jonathan Ashworth	Leicester South	Sep 2015 – Oct 2016
Shadow Attorney General for England and Wales	Vacant		
Opposition Chief Whip in the House of Commons	Rosie Winterton	Doncaster Central	Oct 2010 – Oct 2016
Leader of the European Parliamentary Labour Party	Glenis Willmott	MEP for East Midlands	Jan 2009 – Oct 2017
**Refused to attend meetings**
Shadow Leader of the House of Lords	Angela Smith	Life peer	May 2015 – July 2024
Opposition Chief Whip in the House of Lords	Steve Bassam	Life peer	May 2010 – Jan 2018

=== October 2016 – February 2017 ===
Sits in the House of Commons
Sits in the House of Lords

Portfolio	Shadow Minister	Constituency	Term
Leader of the Opposition; Leader of the Labour Party	Jeremy Corbyn	Islington North	Sep 2015 – Apr 2020
Deputy Leader of the Labour Party	Tom Watson	West Bromwich East	Sep 2015 – Dec 2019
Chair of the Labour Party	Tom Watson	West Bromwich East	Sep 2015 – June 2017
Shadow Secretary of State for Culture, Media and Sport	Tom Watson	West Bromwich East	Oct 2016 – December 2019
Shadow Chancellor of the Exchequer	John McDonnell	Hayes and Harlington	Sep 2015 – Apr 2020
Shadow Chief Secretary to the Treasury	Rebecca Long-Bailey	Salford and Eccles	June 2016 – Feb 2017
Shadow Foreign Secretary	Emily Thornberry	Islington South and Finsbury	June 2016 – April 2020
Shadow Secretary of State for Exiting the European Union	Sir Keir Starmer	Holborn and St Pancras	Oct 2016 – April 2020
Shadow Home Secretary	Diane Abbott	Hackney North and Stoke Newington	Oct 2016 – April 2020
Shadow Lord President of the Council	Jon Trickett	Hemsworth	June 2016 – April 2020
Shadow Secretary of State for Business, Energy and Industrial Strategy	Clive Lewis	Norwich South	Oct 2016 – Feb 2017
Shadow Secretary of State for Health	Jonathan Ashworth	Leicester South	Oct 2016 – Nov 2021
Shadow Secretary of State for Education	Angela Rayner	Ashton-under-Lyne	July 2016 – April 2020
Shadow Secretary of State for Women and Equalities	Sarah Champion	Rotherham	Oct 2016 – Aug 2017
Shadow Secretary of State for Work and Pensions	Debbie Abrahams	Oldham East and Saddleworth	June 2016 – March 2018
Shadow Secretary of State for Defence	Nia Griffith	Llanelli	Oct 2016 – April 2020
Shadow Lord Chancellor; Shadow Secretary of State for Justice	Richard Burgon	Leeds East	June 2016 – April 2020
Shadow Secretary of State for Communities and Local Government	Teresa Pearce	Erith and Thamesmead	Oct 2016 – June 2017
Shadow Secretary of State for International Trade; Shadow Minister for Energy and Climate Change	Barry Gardiner	Brent North	July 2016 – April 2020
Shadow Secretary of State for Transport	Andy McDonald	Middlesbrough	June 2016 – April 2020
Shadow Secretary of State for International Development	Kate Osamor	Edmonton	June 2016 – Dec 2018
Shadow Secretary of State for Northern Ireland	Dave Anderson	Blaydon	June 2016 – June 2017
Shadow Secretary of State for Scotland	Dave Anderson	Blaydon	July 2016 – June 2017
Shadow Secretary of State for Wales	Jo Stevens	Cardiff Central	Oct 2016 – Jan 2017
Shadow Secretary of State for Environment, Food and Rural Affairs	Rachael Maskell	York Central	June 2016 – Feb 2017
Shadow Minister for Voter Engagement and Youth Affairs	Cat Smith	Lancaster and Fleetwood	June 2016 – Nov 2021
Shadow Minister for Mental Health and Social Care	Barbara Keeley	Worsley and Eccles South	Oct 2016 – April 2020
Shadow Secretary of State for Housing	John Healey	Wentworth and Dearne	Oct 2016 – April 2020
Shadow Minister for the Cabinet Office	Ian Lavery	Wansbeck	Oct 2016 – Feb 2017
Shadow Minister without Portfolio	Andrew Gwynne	Denton and Reddish	Oct 2016 – June 2017
Shadow Attorney General for England and Wales	Shami Chakrabarti	Life peer	Oct 2016 – April 2020
Shadow Leader of the House of Commons	Valerie Vaz	Walsall South	Oct 2016 – May 2021
Opposition Chief Whip in the House of Commons	Nick Brown	Newcastle upon Tyne East	Oct 2016 – May 2021
Shadow Leader of the House of Lords	Angela Smith	Life peer	May 2015 – July 2024
Opposition Chief Whip in the House of Lords	Steve Bassam	Life peer	May 2010 – Jan 2018
Leader of the European Parliamentary Labour Party	Glenis Willmott	MEP for East Midlands	Jan 2009 – Oct 2017

=== February – June 2017 ===
Sits in the House of Commons
Sits in the House of Lords

Portfolio	Shadow Minister	Constituency	Term
Leader of the Opposition; Leader of the Labour Party	Jeremy Corbyn	Islington North	Sep 2015 – Apr 2020
Deputy Leader of the Labour Party	Tom Watson	West Bromwich East	Sep 2015 – Dec 2019
Chair of the Labour Party	Tom Watson	West Bromwich East	Sep 2015 – June 2017
Shadow Secretary of State for Culture, Media and Sport	Tom Watson	West Bromwich East	Oct 2016 – December 2019
Shadow Chancellor of the Exchequer	John McDonnell	Hayes and Harlington	Sep 2015 – Apr 2020
Shadow Chief Secretary to the Treasury	Peter Dowd	Bootle	Feb 2017 – April 2020
Shadow Foreign Secretary	Emily Thornberry	Islington South and Finsbury	June 2016 – April 2020
Shadow Secretary of State for Exiting the European Union	Sir Keir Starmer	Holborn and St Pancras	Oct 2016 – April 2020
Shadow Home Secretary	Diane Abbott	Hackney North and Stoke Newington	Oct 2016 – April 2020
Shadow Lord President of the Council	Jon Trickett	Hemsworth	June 2016 – April 2020
Shadow Minister for the Cabinet Office	Jon Trickett	Hemsworth	Feb 2017 – April 2020
Shadow Secretary of State for Business, Energy and Industrial Strategy	Rebecca Long-Bailey	Salford and Eccles	Feb 2017 – April 2020
Shadow Secretary of State for Health	Jonathan Ashworth	Leicester South	Oct 2016 – Nov 2021
Shadow Secretary of State for Education	Angela Rayner	Ashton-under-Lyne	July 2016 – April 2020
Shadow Secretary of State for Women and Equalities	Sarah Champion	Rotherham	Oct 2016 – Aug 2017
Shadow Secretary of State for Work and Pensions	Debbie Abrahams	Oldham East and Saddleworth	June 2016 – March 2018
Shadow Secretary of State for Defence	Nia Griffith	Llanelli	Oct 2016 – April 2020
Shadow Lord Chancellor; Shadow Secretary of State for Justice	Richard Burgon	Leeds East	June 2016 – April 2020
Shadow Secretary of State for Communities and Local Government	Teresa Pearce	Erith and Thamesmead	Oct 2016 – June 2017
Shadow Secretary of State for International Trade; Shadow Minister for Energy and Climate Change	Barry Gardiner	Brent North	July 2016 – April 2020
Shadow Secretary of State for Transport	Andy McDonald	Middlesbrough	June 2016 – April 2020
Shadow Secretary of State for International Development	Kate Osamor	Edmonton	June 2016 – Dec 2018
Shadow Secretary of State for Northern Ireland	Dave Anderson	Blaydon	June 2016 – June 2017
Shadow Secretary of State for Scotland	Dave Anderson	Blaydon	July 2016 – June 2017
Shadow Secretary of State for Wales	Christina Rees	Neath	Feb 2017 – April 2020
Shadow Secretary of State for Environment, Food and Rural Affairs	Sue Hayman	Workington	Feb 2017 – Dec 2019
Shadow Minister for Voter Engagement and Youth Affairs	Cat Smith	Lancaster and Fleetwood	June 2016 – Nov 2021
Shadow Minister for Mental Health and Social Care	Barbara Keeley	Worsley and Eccles South	Oct 2016 – April 2020
Shadow Secretary of State for Housing	John Healey	Wentworth and Dearne	Oct 2016 – April 2020
Shadow Minister for the Cabinet Office	Ian Lavery	Wansbeck	Oct 2016 – Feb 2017
Shadow Minister without Portfolio	Ian Lavery	Wansbeck	Feb 2017 – April 2020
Shadow Minister without Portfolio	Andrew Gwynne	Denton and Reddish	Oct 2016 – June 2017
Shadow Attorney General for England and Wales	Shami Chakrabarti	Life peer	Oct 2016 – April 2020
Shadow Leader of the House of Commons	Valerie Vaz	Walsall South	Oct 2016 – May 2021
Opposition Chief Whip in the House of Commons	Nick Brown	Newcastle upon Tyne East	Oct 2016 – May 2021
Shadow Leader of the House of Lords	Angela Smith	Life peer	May 2015 – July 2024
Opposition Chief Whip in the House of Lords	Steve Bassam	Life peer	May 2010 – Jan 2018
Leader of the European Parliamentary Labour Party	Glenis Willmott	MEP for East Midlands	Jan 2009 – Oct 2017

=== June 2017 – December 2019 ===
Sits in the House of Commons
Sits in the House of Lords

Portfolio	Shadow Minister	Constituency	Term
Leader of the Opposition; Leader of the Labour Party	Jeremy Corbyn	Islington North	Sep 2015 – Apr 2020
Deputy Leader of the Labour Party	Tom Watson	West Bromwich East	Sep 2015 – Dec 2019
Chair of the Labour Party	Tom Watson	West Bromwich East	Sep 2015 – June 2017
Shadow Secretary of State for Digital, Culture, Media and Sport	Tom Watson	West Bromwich East	Oct 2016 – Nov 2019
Shadow First Secretary of State	Emily Thornberry	Islington South and Finsbury	June 2017 – April 2020
Shadow Foreign Secretary	Emily Thornberry	Islington South and Finsbury	June 2016 – April 2020
Shadow Chancellor of the Exchequer	John McDonnell	Hayes and Harlington	Sep 2015 – Apr 2020
Shadow Chief Secretary to the Treasury	Peter Dowd	Bootle	Feb 2017 – April 2020
Shadow Secretary of State for Exiting the European Union	Sir Keir Starmer	Holborn and St Pancras	Oct 2016 – April 2020
Shadow Home Secretary	Diane Abbott	Hackney North and Stoke Newington	Oct 2016 – April 2020
Shadow Lord President of the Council	Jon Trickett	Hemsworth	June 2016 – April 2020
Shadow Minister for the Cabinet Office	Jon Trickett	Hemsworth	Feb 2017 – April 2020
Shadow Secretary of State for Business, Energy and Industrial Strategy	Rebecca Long-Bailey	Salford and Eccles	Feb 2017 – April 2020
Shadow Secretary of State for Health	Jonathan Ashworth	Leicester South	Oct 2016 – Nov 2021
Shadow Secretary of State for Education	Angela Rayner	Ashton-under-Lyne	July 2016 – April 2020
Shadow Secretary of State for Women and Equalities	Sarah Champion	Rotherham	Oct 2016 – Aug 2017
Shadow Secretary of State for Women and Equalities	Dawn Butler	Brent Central	Aug 2017 – April 2020
Shadow Secretary of State for Work and Pensions	Debbie Abrahams	Oldham East and Saddleworth	June 2016 – March 2018
Shadow Secretary of State for Work and Pensions	Margaret Greenwood	Wirral West	March 2018 – April 2020
Shadow Minister for Labour	Laura Pidcock	North West Durham	Jan 2018 – Sep 2019
Shadow Secretary of State for Employment Rights	Laura Pidcock	North West Durham	Sep – Dec 2019
Shadow Secretary of State for Defence	Nia Griffith	Llanelli	Oct 2016 – April 2020
Shadow Lord Chancellor; Shadow Secretary of State for Justice	Richard Burgon	Leeds East	June 2016 – April 2020
Shadow Secretary of State for Communities and Local Government	Andrew Gwynne	Denton and Reddish	June 2017 – April 2020
Shadow Secretary of State for International Trade; Shadow Minister for Energy and Climate Change	Barry Gardiner	Brent North	July 2016 – April 2020
Shadow Secretary of State for Transport	Andy McDonald	Middlesbrough	June 2016 – April 2020
Shadow Secretary of State for International Development	Kate Osamor	Edmonton	June 2016 – Dec 2018
Shadow Secretary of State for International Development	Dan Carden	Liverpool Walton	Dec 2018 – April 2020
Shadow Secretary of State for Northern Ireland	Owen Smith	Pontypridd	June 2017 – March 2018
Shadow Secretary of State for Northern Ireland	Tony Lloyd	Rochdale	March 2018 – April 2020
Shadow Secretary of State for Scotland	Lesley Laird	Kirkcaldy and Cowdenbeath	June 2017 – Dec 2019
Shadow Secretary of State for Wales	Christina Rees	Neath	Feb 2017 – April 2020
Shadow Secretary of State for Environment, Food and Rural Affairs	Sue Hayman	Workington	Feb 2017 – Dec 2019
Shadow Minister for Voter Engagement and Youth Affairs	Cat Smith	Lancaster and Fleetwood	June 2016 – Nov 2021
Shadow Minister for Mental Health and Social Care	Barbara Keeley	Worsley and Eccles South	Oct 2016 – April 2020
Shadow Secretary of State for Housing	John Healey	Wentworth and Dearne	Oct 2016 – April 2020
Shadow Minister without Portfolio	Ian Lavery	Wansbeck	Feb 2017 – April 2020
Chair of the Labour Party	Ian Lavery	Wansbeck	June 2017 – April 2020
Shadow Attorney General for England and Wales	Shami Chakrabarti	Life peer	Oct 2016 – April 2020
Shadow Leader of the House of Commons	Valerie Vaz	Walsall South	Oct 2016 – May 2021
Opposition Chief Whip in the House of Commons	Nick Brown	Newcastle upon Tyne East	Oct 2016 – May 2021
Shadow Leader of the House of Lords	Angela Smith	Life peer	May 2015 – July 2024
Opposition Chief Whip in the House of Lords	Tommy McAvoy	Life peer	Jan 2018 – May 2021
Leader of the European Parliamentary Labour Party	Glenis Willmott	MEP for East Midlands	Jan 2009 – Oct 2017
Leader of the European Parliamentary Labour Party	Richard Corbett	MEP for Yorkshire and the Humber	Oct 2017 – Jan 2020

=== January – April 2020 ===
Sits in the House of Commons
Sits in the House of Lords

Portfolio	Shadow Minister	Constituency	Term
Leader of the Opposition; Leader of the Labour Party	Jeremy Corbyn	Islington North	Sep 2015 – Apr 2020
Shadow First Secretary of State	Emily Thornberry	Islington South and Finsbury	June 2017 – April 2020
Shadow Foreign Secretary	Emily Thornberry	Islington South and Finsbury	June 2016 – April 2020
Shadow Chancellor of the Exchequer	John McDonnell	Hayes and Harlington	Sep 2015 – Apr 2020
Shadow Chief Secretary to the Treasury	Peter Dowd	Bootle	Feb 2017 – April 2020
Shadow Secretary of State for Exiting the European Union	Sir Keir Starmer	Holborn and St Pancras	Oct 2016 – April 2020
Shadow Home Secretary	Diane Abbott	Hackney North and Stoke Newington	Oct 2016 – April 2020
Shadow Lord President of the Council	Jon Trickett	Hemsworth	June 2016 – April 2020
Shadow Minister for the Cabinet Office	Jon Trickett	Hemsworth	Feb 2017 – April 2020
Shadow Secretary of State for Business, Energy and Industrial Strategy	Rebecca Long-Bailey	Salford and Eccles	Feb 2017 – April 2020
Shadow Secretary of State for Health	Jonathan Ashworth	Leicester South	Oct 2016 – Nov 2021
Shadow Secretary of State for Education	Angela Rayner	Ashton-under-Lyne	July 2016 – April 2020
Shadow Secretary of State for Women and Equalities	Dawn Butler	Brent Central	Aug 2017 – April 2020
Shadow Secretary of State for Work and Pensions	Margaret Greenwood	Wirral West	March 2018 – April 2020
Shadow Secretary of State for Digital, Culture, Media and Sport	Tracy Brabin	Batley and Spen	Jan – April 2020
Shadow Secretary of State for Employment Rights	Rachael Maskell	York Central	Jan – April 2020
Shadow Secretary of State for Defence	Nia Griffith	Llanelli	Oct 2016 – April 2020
Shadow Lord Chancellor; Shadow Secretary of State for Justice	Richard Burgon	Leeds East	June 2016 – April 2020
Shadow Secretary of State for Communities and Local Government	Andrew Gwynne	Denton and Reddish	June 2017 – April 2020
Shadow Secretary of State for International Trade; Shadow Minister for Energy and Climate Change	Barry Gardiner	Brent North	July 2016 – April 2020
Shadow Secretary of State for Transport	Andy McDonald	Middlesbrough	June 2016 – April 2020
Shadow Secretary of State for International Development	Dan Carden	Liverpool Walton	Dec 2018 – April 2020
Shadow Secretary of State for Northern Ireland	Tony Lloyd	Rochdale	March 2018 – April 2020
Shadow Secretary of State for Scotland	Tony Lloyd	Rochdale	Dec 2019 – April 2020
Shadow Secretary of State for Wales	Christina Rees	Neath	Feb 2017 – April 2020
Shadow Secretary of State for Environment, Food and Rural Affairs	Luke Pollard	Plymouth Sutton and Devonport	Jan 2020 – Nov 2021
Shadow Minister for Voter Engagement and Youth Affairs	Cat Smith	Lancaster and Fleetwood	June 2016 – Nov 2021
Shadow Minister for Mental Health and Social Care	Barbara Keeley	Worsley and Eccles South	Oct 2016 – April 2020
Shadow Secretary of State for Housing	John Healey	Wentworth and Dearne	Oct 2016 – April 2020
Shadow Minister without Portfolio	Ian Lavery	Wansbeck	Feb 2017 – April 2020
Chair of the Labour Party	Ian Lavery	Wansbeck	June 2017 – April 2020
Shadow Attorney General for England and Wales	Shami Chakrabarti	Life peer	Oct 2016 – April 2020
Shadow Leader of the House of Commons	Valerie Vaz	Walsall South	Oct 2016 – May 2021
Opposition Chief Whip in the House of Commons	Nick Brown	Newcastle upon Tyne East	Oct 2016 – May 2021
Shadow Leader of the House of Lords	Angela Smith	Life peer	May 2015 – July 2024
Opposition Chief Whip in the House of Lords	Tommy McAvoy	Life peer	Jan 2018 – May 2021
Leader of the European Parliamentary Labour Party	Richard Corbett	MEP for Yorkshire and the Humber	Oct 2017 – Jan 2020

=== Junior ministers by department ===
Key:

Member of the House of Commons
Member of the House of Lords
Privy Counsellor
Shadow Cabinet full members **in bold**
Shadow Cabinet attendees **in bold italics**

==== Leader's Office and Cabinet Office ====
Office of the Leader of the Opposition
Leader of Her Majesty's Most Loyal Opposition; Leader of the Labour Party	**Jeremy Corbyn**
Parliamentary Private Secretary to the Leader of the Opposition	Steve Rotheram (2015–2017)
Parliamentary Private Secretary to the Leader of the Opposition	Kate Hollern (2017–2020)
Parliamentary Private Secretary to the Leader of the Opposition	Tan Dhesi (2020)
Deputy Leader of the Labour Party	**Tom Watson**
Shadow First Secretary of State	**Angela Eagle** (2015–2016)
Shadow First Secretary of State	**Emily Thornberry** (2017–2020)

Cabinet Office
Shadow Minister for the Cabinet Office	**Tom Watson** (2015–2016)
Shadow Minister for the Cabinet Office	**Ian Lavery** (2016–2017)
Shadow Minister for the Cabinet Office	**Jon Trickett** (2017–2020)
Labour Party Chair	**Tom Watson** (2015–2017)
Labour Party Chair	**Ian Lavery** (2017–2020)
Shadow Lord President of the Council	**Jon Trickett** (2016–2020)
Shadow Minister without Portfolio	Jon Ashworth (2015–2016)
Shadow Minister without Portfolio	Andrew Gwynne (2016–2017)
Shadow Minister without Portfolio	Ian Lavery (2017–2020)
Co-National Campaign Coordinators	**Ian Lavery** (2017–2020)
Co-National Campaign Coordinators	**Andrew Gwynne** (2017–2020)
Shadow Minister for Voter Engagement and Youth Affairs	**Gloria De Piero** (2015–2016)
Shadow Minister for Voter Engagement and Youth Affairs	**Cat Smith** (2016–2020)
Shadow Minister of State for the Cabinet Office	Laura Smith (2018)
Shadow Minister of State for the Cabinet Office	Jo Platt (2018–2019)
Shadow Minister of State for the Cabinet Office	**Cat Smith** (2020)
Shadow Ministers for the Cabinet Office	Wayne David (2015–2016)
Shadow Ministers for the Cabinet Office	Ian Lavery (2015–2016)
Shadow Ministers for the Cabinet Office	Chris Matheson (2018–2020)
Shadow Spokesperson in the House of Lords for the Cabinet Office	The Baroness Hayter of Kentish Town

==== Foreign Relations ====
Foreign and Commonwealth Office
Shadow Foreign Secretary	**Hilary Benn** (2015–2016)
Shadow Foreign Secretary	**Emily Thornberry** (2016–2020)
Shadow Minister for Europe	Pat McFadden (2015–2016)
Shadow Minister for Europe	Pat Glass (2016)
Shadow Minister for Europe	Fabian Hamilton (2016)
Shadow Minister for Europe	Khalid Mahmood (2016–2020)
Shadow Minister for Peace and Disarmament	Fabian Hamilton (2016–2020)
Shadow Minister for Americas, Far East and Overseas Territories	Catherine West (2015–2017)
Shadow Minister for Americas, Far East and Overseas Territories	Helen Goodman (2017–2019)
Shadow Minister for Americas, Far East and Overseas Territories	Lloyd Russell-Moyle (2020)
Shadow Minister for the Middle East	Fabian Hamilton (2017–2020)
Shadow Minister for South Asia, Sub-Saharan Africa and the Commonwealth	Stephen Doughty (2015–2016)
Shadow Minister for South Asia, Sub-Saharan Africa and the Commonwealth	Fabian Hamilton (2016)
Shadow Minister for South Asia, Sub-Saharan Africa and the Commonwealth	Liz McInnes (2016–2019)
Shadow Minister for South Asia, Sub-Saharan Africa and the Commonwealth	Afzal Khan (2020)
Shadow Minister for Foreign and Commonwealth Affairs	Diana Johnson (2015–2016)
Shadow Minister for Foreign and Commonwealth Affairs	David Hanson (2015)
Shadow Spokesperson in the House of Lords	The Lord Collins of Highbury (2015–2020)

Defence
Shadow Secretary of State for Defence	**Maria Eagle** (2015–2016)
Shadow Secretary of State for Defence	**Emily Thornberry** (2016)
Shadow Secretary of State for Defence	**Clive Lewis** (2016)
Shadow Secretary of State for Defence	**Nia Griffith** (2016–2020)
Shadow Minister for the Armed Forces	Kevan Jones (2015–2016)
Shadow Minister for the Armed Forces	Kate Hollern (2016)
Shadow Minister for the Armed Forces	Wayne David (2016–2020)
Shadow Minister of State for Armed Forces Personnel and Veterans	Rachael Maskell (2015–2016)
Shadow Minister of State for Armed Forces Personnel and Veterans	Vacant (2016–2017)
Shadow Minister of State for Armed Forces Personnel and Veterans	Gerald Jones (2017–2020)
Shadow Minister for Defence Procurement	Wayne David (2016–2020)
Shadow Minister for Defence Procurement	Stephen Morgan (2020)
Shadow Minister for Defence	Toby Perkins (2015–2016)
Shadow Spokesperson in the House of Lords	The Lord Tunnicliffe

International Development
Shadow Secretary of State for International Development	**Diane Abbott** (2015–2016)
Shadow Secretary of State for International Development	**Kate Osamor** (2016–2018)
Shadow Secretary of State for International Development	**Dan Carden** (2018–2020)
Shadow Minister for International Development	Mike Kane (2015–2016)
Shadow Minister for International Development	Imran Hussain (2016–2017)
Shadow Minister for International Development	Roberta Blackman-Woods (2017–2018)
Shadow Minister for International Development	Dan Carden (2018)
Shadow Minister for International Development	Preet Kaur Gill (2018–2020)

International Trade
Shadow Secretary of State for International Trade	**Barry Gardiner** (2016–2020)
Shadow Minister for International Trade	Bill Esterson (2016–2020)
Shadow Minister for International Trade	Judith Cummins (2018–2020)

Brexit
Shadow Secretary of State for Exiting the European Union	**Emily Thornberry** (2016)
Shadow Secretary of State for Exiting the European Union	**Sir Keir Starmer** (2016–2020)
Shadow Minister for Exiting the European Union	Paul Blomfield (2016–2020)
Shadow Minister for Exiting the European Union	Matthew Pennycook (2016–2019)
Shadow Minister for Exiting the European Union	Jenny Chapman (2016–2019)
Shadow Minister for Exiting the European Union	Thangam Debbonaire (2020)

==== Home Affairs ====
Home Office
Shadow Home Secretary	**Andy Burnham** (2015–2016)
Shadow Home Secretary	**Diane Abbott** (2016–2020)
Shadow Minister for Immigration	Sir Keir Starmer (2015–2016)
Shadow Minister for Immigration	Afzal Khan (2017–2020)
Shadow Minister for Immigration	Bell Ribeiro-Addy (2020)
Shadow Minister for Crime Reduction	Lyn Brown (2015–2016)
Shadow Minister for Crime Reduction	Rupa Huq (2016–2017)
Shadow Minister for Security	Nick Thomas-Symonds (2017–2020)
Shadow Minister for Safeguarding	Sarah Champion (2015–2016)
Shadow Minister for Safeguarding	Carolyn Harris (2016–2020)
Shadow Minister for Policing	Jack Dromey (2015–2016)
Shadow Minister for Policing	Lyn Brown (2016–2017)
Shadow Minister for Policing	Louise Haigh (2017–2020)
Shadow Minister for Fire and Emergency Services	Chris Williamson (2017–2018)
Shadow Minister for Fire and Emergency Services	Karen Lee (2018–2019)

Attorney General's Office
Shadow Attorney General	**Catherine McKinnell** (2015–2016)
Shadow Attorney General	**Karl Turner** (2016)
Shadow Attorney General	**Baroness Chakrabarti** (2016–2020)
Shadow Solicitor General	Karl Turner (2015–2016)
Shadow Solicitor General	Jo Stevens (2016)
Shadow Solicitor General	Nick Thomas-Symonds (2016–2020)

Ministry of Justice
Shadow Justice Secretary	**Lord Falconer** (2015–2016)
Shadow Justice Secretary	**Richard Burgon** (2016–2020)
Shadow Minister for Prisons	Jenny Chapman (2015–2016)
Shadow Minister for Prisons	Imran Hussain (2017–2020)
Shadow Minister for Courts and Legal Aid	Andy Slaughter (2015–2016)
Shadow Minister for Courts and Legal Aid	Yasmin Qureshi (2016–2020)
Shadow Minister for Justice	Wayne David (2015–2016)
Shadow Minister for Justice	Karl Turner (2015–2016)
Shadow Minister for Justice	Jo Stevens (2016)
Shadow Minister for Justice	Christina Rees (2016–2017)
Shadow Minister for Justice	Gloria De Piero (2017–2019)
Shadow Minister for Justice	Bambos Charalambous (2020)

==== Economy ====
Treasury
Shadow Chancellor of the Exchequer	**John McDonnell** (2015–2020)
Shadow Chief Secretary to the Treasury	**Seema Malhotra** (2015–2016)
Shadow Chief Secretary to the Treasury	**Rebecca Long-Bailey** (2016–2017)
Shadow Chief Secretary to the Treasury	**Peter Dowd** (2017–2020)
Shadow Financial Secretary to the Treasury	Rob Marris (2015–2016)
Shadow Financial Secretary to the Treasury	Peter Dowd (2016–2017)
Shadow Financial Secretary to the Treasury	Anneliese Dodds (2017–2020)
Shadow Economic Secretary to the Treasury	Richard Burgon (2015–2016)
Shadow Economic Secretary to the Treasury	Jonathan Reynolds (2016–2020)
Shadow Exchequer Secretary to the Treasury	Lyn Brown (2018–2020)
Shadow Minister for Sustainable Economics	Clive Lewis (2018–2020)
Shadow Treasury Minister	Rebecca Long-Bailey (2015–2016)

Department for Business, Energy and Industrial Strategy
Shadow Secretary of State for Business, Energy and Industrial Strategy	**Angela Eagle** (2015–2016)
Shadow Secretary of State for Business, Energy and Industrial Strategy	**Jon Trickett** (2016)
Shadow Secretary of State for Business, Energy and Industrial Strategy	**Clive Lewis** (2016–2017)
Shadow Secretary of State for Business, Energy and Industrial Strategy	**Rebecca Long-Bailey** (2017–2020)
Shadow Secretary of State for Employment Rights & Protections	**Laura Pidcock** (2019)
Shadow Secretary of State for Employment Rights & Protections	**Rachael Maskell** (2020)
Shadow Minister for Labour	Jack Dromey (2016–2018)
Shadow Minister for Labour	Laura Pidcock (2018–2019)
Shadow Minister for Labour	Justin Madders (2018–2019)
Shadow Minister for Digital Economy	Chi Onwurah (2015–2016)
Shadow Minister for Digital Economy	Louise Haigh (2016–2017)
Shadow Minister for Digital Economy	Liam Byrne (2017–2020)
Shadow Minister for Small Business	Bill Esterson (2015–2020)
Shadow Minister for Business, Innovation & Skills	Yvonne Fovargue (2015–2016)
Shadow Minister for Trade & Investment	Stephen Doughty (2015)
Shadow Minister for Trade & Investment	Kevin Brennan (2015–2016)
Shadow Minister for Higher Education, Further Education & Skills	Gordon Marsden (2015–2019)
Shadow Minister for Industrial Strategy	Chi Onwurah (2016–2020)
Shadow Minister for Steel, Postal Affairs & Consumer Protection	Gill Furniss (2016–2020)
Shadow Minister for Climate Justice & Green Jobs	Danielle Rowley (2019)

Energy and Climate Change (2015–2016)
Shadow Secretary of State for Energy and Climate Change	**Lisa Nandy** (2015–2016)
Shadow Secretary of State for Energy and Climate Change	**Barry Gardiner** (2016)
Shadow Minister for Energy	Barry Gardiner (2015–2016)
Shadow Minister for Energy	Alan Whitehead (2016–2020)
Shadow Minister for Climate Change	Clive Lewis (2015–2016)
Shadow Minister for Climate Change	Alan Whitehead (2015–2016)
Shadow Minister for International Climate Change	Barry Gardiner (2016–2020)

== Creation ==
Corbyn named his first Shadow Cabinet appointments on 13 September and announced its full composition on 14 September. One of Labour's largest reshuffles, the announcement was further delayed by a large number of previous Shadow Cabinet members publicly announcing they would not participate under Corbyn, even if called to do so. The following members declined to serve:

- Chris Leslie was replaced as Shadow Chancellor of the Exchequer by John McDonnell
- Yvette Cooper was replaced as Shadow Home Secretary by Andy Burnham
- Chuka Umunna was replaced as Shadow Secretary of State for Business, Innovation and Skills by Angela Eagle; who was further appointed Shadow First Secretary of State, deputising at Prime Minister's Questions, a role that was filled by Hilary Benn in the previous Shadow Cabinet
- Rachel Reeves was replaced as Shadow Secretary of State for Work and Pensions by Owen Smith, though she was on maternity leave at the time of her announcement and the brief had been filled by Stephen Timms since shortly after the general election, who himself rejected a junior role
- Tristram Hunt was replaced as Shadow Secretary of State for Education by Lucy Powell
- Emma Reynolds was replaced as Shadow Secretary of State for Communities and Local Government by Jon Trickett, who was also appointed to a new role as Shadow Minister for the Constitutional Convention
- Caroline Flint was replaced as Shadow Secretary of State for Energy and Climate Change by Lisa Nandy
- Mary Creagh was replaced as Shadow Secretary of State for International Development by Diane Abbott
- Shabana Mahmood was replaced as Shadow Chief Secretary to the Treasury by Seema Malhotra
- Liz Kendall resigned as Shadow Minister for Care and Older People (attending Shadow Cabinet); a junior minister appointment was not announced immediately. Barbara Keeley was appointed in October 2016.

The remaining changes were as follows:

- Harriet Harman, who had previously announced she would step down from frontbench politics after nearly 30 years, was replaced as Deputy Leader by Tom Watson, who also replaced Powell as Shadow Minister for the Cabinet Office
- Burnham was replaced as Shadow Secretary of State for Health by Heidi Alexander
- Vernon Coaker was replaced as Shadow Secretary of State for Defence by Maria Eagle
- Angela Eagle was replaced as Shadow Leader of the House of Commons by Chris Bryant
- Michael Dugher was replaced as Shadow Secretary of State for Transport by Lilian Greenwood
- Ivan Lewis, who stated he was willing to serve, was replaced as Shadow Secretary of State for Northern Ireland by Coaker
- Owen Smith was replaced as Shadow Secretary of State for Wales by Nia Griffith
- Maria Eagle was replaced as Shadow Secretary of State for Environment, Food and Rural Affairs by Kerry McCarthy
- Bryant was replaced as Shadow Secretary of State for Culture, Media and Sport by Dugher
- Trickett was replaced as Shadow Minister without Portfolio by Jonathan Ashworth, not as a full member, like Trickett, but still attending Shadow Cabinet
- Gloria De Piero was replaced as Shadow Minister for Women and Equalities by Kate Green, but was appointed to a new role as Shadow Minister for Young People and Voter Registration with full Shadow Cabinet membership
- Luciana Berger was appointed to a new role as Shadow Minister for Mental Health with full Shadow Cabinet membership
- Willy Bach was replaced as Shadow Attorney General (attending Shadow Cabinet) by Catherine McKinnell
- Roberta Blackman-Woods was replaced as Shadow Minister for Housing and Planning by John Healey, though Healey would be attending Shadow Cabinet, unlike Blackman-Woods

== Composition ==
- In his inaugural Shadow Cabinet, 17 out of 31 members were women, making it the first frontbench team in British parliamentary history to comprise a female majority. Corbyn was criticised for giving what are traditionally seen as the top jobs (Chancellor, Home Secretary and Foreign Secretary) to men, although he insisted that positions such as Education and Health Secretary were just as important.
- All members of Corbyn's first Shadow Cabinet previously voted in favour of the Marriage (Same Sex Couples) Act 2013.

== January 2016 reshuffle ==
On 6 January 2016, Corbyn replaced Shadow Culture Secretary Michael Dugher with Shadow Defence Secretary Maria Eagle (who was in turn replaced by Shadow Employment Minister Emily Thornberry). He also replaced Shadow Europe Minister (not attending Shadow Cabinet) Pat McFadden with Pat Glass. The reshuffle prompted three junior shadow ministers to resign in solidarity with McFadden: Shadow Rail Minister Jonathan Reynolds, Shadow Defence Minister Kevan Jones and Shadow Foreign Minister Stephen Doughty. On 7 January, Reynolds was replaced by Andy McDonald, Doughty by Fabian Hamilton, Jones by Kate Hollern and Thornberry by Angela Rayner; as well as appointing Jenny Chapman to the education team and Jo Stevens to the justice team.

On 11 January 2016, Shadow Attorney General Catherine McKinnell resigned, citing party infighting, family reasons and a wish to speak in Parliament away from front-bench responsibilities. She was replaced by Karl Turner.

== June 2016 reshuffle ==
=== Resignations ===
On Sunday 26 June and Monday 27 June 2016, a number of members of the shadow cabinet either resigned or were sacked. This process began with Jeremy Corbyn sacking Hilary Benn as Shadow Foreign Secretary in the early hours of Sunday morning after Corbyn informed Benn that he knew Benn had been constructing a coup against the Leadership during the run up to the vote to leave the European Union. Subsequently, the following resigned (in chronological order):

- Heidi Alexander – Shadow Health Secretary
- Gloria De Piero – Shadow Minister for Young People and Voter Registration
- Ian Murray – Shadow Scottish Secretary
- Lilian Greenwood – Shadow Transport Secretary
- Lucy Powell – Shadow Education Secretary
- Kerry McCarthy – Shadow Environment Secretary
- Seema Malhotra – Shadow Chief Secretary to the Treasury
- Vernon Coaker – Shadow Northern Ireland Secretary
- Charles Falconer – Shadow Justice Secretary
- Karl Turner – Shadow Attorney General
- Chris Bryant – Shadow Leader of the House of Commons
- Diana Johnson – Shadow Foreign and Commonwealth Minister

On 27 June:

- Lisa Nandy – Shadow Energy Secretary
- Owen Smith – Shadow Work and Pensions Secretary
- Angela Eagle – Shadow First Secretary of State and Shadow Business Secretary
- John Healey – Shadow Minister for Housing and Planning
- Nia Griffith – Shadow Welsh Secretary
- Maria Eagle – Shadow Culture Secretary
- Kate Green – Shadow Minister for Women and Equalities
- Luciana Berger – Shadow Minister for Mental Health

On 29 June:

- Pat Glass – new Shadow Education Secretary

All cited concerns over the EU vote and Corbyn's leadership.

Lords leader Angela Smith of Basildon and Lords chief whip Steve Bassam stated they would boycott shadow cabinet meetings while Jeremy Corbyn remained leader. They remained members of the shadow cabinet as these positions are elected by the Labour members of the upper chamber. They returned to attending shadow cabinet four months later.

=== New appointments ===
Following the resignations, Corbyn appointed several new MPs to shadow cabinet positions:

- Emily Thornberry – Shadow Foreign Secretary
- Diane Abbott – Shadow Health Secretary
- Pat Glass – Shadow Education Secretary (resigned on 29 June 2016)
- Andy McDonald – Shadow Transport Secretary
- Clive Lewis – Shadow Defence Secretary
- Rebecca Long-Bailey – Shadow Chief Secretary to the Treasury
- Kate Osamor – Shadow International Development Secretary (resigned on 1 December 2018)
- Rachael Maskell – Shadow Environment Secretary
- Cat Smith – Shadow Minister for Voter Engagement and Youth Affairs
- Dave Anderson – Shadow Northern Ireland Secretary
- Dave Anderson – Shadow Scottish Secretary
- Richard Burgon – Shadow Justice Secretary
- Debbie Abrahams – Shadow Work and Pensions Secretary
- Grahame Morris – Shadow Communities Secretary
- Barry Gardiner – Shadow Energy Secretary
- Jon Trickett – Shadow Lord President of the Council
- Jon Trickett – Shadow Business Secretary
- Angela Rayner – Shadow Minister for Women and Equalities (later appointed Shadow Education Secretary)
- Angela Rayner – Shadow Education Secretary
- Paul Flynn – Shadow Secretary of State for Wales
- Paul Flynn – Shadow Leader of the House of Commons
- Kelvin Hopkins – Shadow Culture Secretary
- Emily Thornberry – Shadow Secretary of State for Exiting the European Union
- Barry Gardiner – Shadow International Trade Secretary

== October 2016 reshuffle ==
Following his victory in the 2016 Labour leadership election, Jeremy Corbyn began a reshuffle of his cabinet on 7 October:

- Leader of the Opposition – Jeremy Corbyn
- Deputy Leader and Shadow Culture Secretary – Tom Watson
- Shadow Chancellor of the Exchequer – John McDonnell
- Shadow Foreign Secretary – Emily Thornberry
- Shadow Home Secretary – Diane Abbott
- Shadow Education Secretary – Angela Rayner
- Shadow Work and Pensions Secretary – Debbie Abrahams
- Shadow Health Secretary – Jonathan Ashworth
- Shadow Defence Secretary – Nia Griffith
- Shadow Chief Secretary to the Treasury – Rebecca Long-Bailey
- Shadow Secretary of State for Exiting the European Union – Keir Starmer
- Shadow Business Secretary – Clive Lewis
- Shadow International Trade Secretary – Barry Gardiner
- Shadow Transport Secretary – Andy McDonald
- Shadow Communities Secretary – Teresa Pearce
- Shadow Environment Secretary – Rachael Maskell
- Shadow Justice Secretary and Lord Chancellor – Richard Burgon
- Shadow Lord President of the Council – Jon Trickett
- Shadow Attorney General – Shami Chakrabarti
- Shadow Scotland Secretary and Northern Ireland Secretary – Dave Anderson
- Shadow Wales Secretary – Jo Stevens
- Shadow Housing Secretary – John Healey
- Shadow Women and Equalities Minister – Sarah Champion
- Shadow Black and Minority Ethnic Communities Minister – Dawn Butler
- Shadow Voter Engagement and Youth Affairs Minister – Cat Smith
- Shadow Cabinet Office Minister – Ian Lavery
- Shadow Mental Health and Social Care Minister – Barbara Keeley
- Shadow Minister without Portfolio – Andrew Gwynne
- Shadow Leader of the House of Commons – Valerie Vaz

=== Summary of changes ===
Owen Smith, who lost to Corbyn in the preceding leadership election, declined to continue in Shadow Cabinet, if offered. Angela Smith and Steve Bassam formally returned to Shadow Cabinet as Shadow Leader of the House of Lords and Shadow Chief Whip of the House of Lords after boycotting following the June reshuffle.

- Tom Watson, the Deputy Leader of the Opposition, was moved from Shadow Minister for the Cabinet Office and replaced by Ian Lavery.
- Andy Burnham resigned as Shadow Home Secretary to focus on his 2017 bid for Mayor of Greater Manchester and was replaced by Diane Abbott. This made the first Labour frontbench where two of the Great Offices of State were held by women.
- Clive Lewis was moved from Shadow Secretary of State for Defence and was replaced by Nia Griffith.
- Lewis was given the newly merged Shadow Secretary of State for Business, Energy and Industrial Strategy to reflect the departmental changes at Whitehall. Jon Trickett, who had been Shadow Secretary of State for Business, Innovation and Skills, remained Shadow Lord President of the Council and Director of Campaigns and Elections. Barry Gardiner, who had been Shadow Secretary of State for Energy and Climate Change, remained Shadow Secretary of State for International Trade.
- Emily Thornberry remained Shadow Foreign Secretary, but was replaced as Shadow Secretary of State for Exiting the European Union by Keir Starmer.
- Abbott was replaced as Shadow Secretary of State for Health by Jon Ashworth.
- Grahame Morris went on leave and was replaced as Shadow Secretary of State for Communities and Local Government and Shadow Minister for the Constitutional Convention by Teresa Pearce.
- Kelvin Hopkins was replaced as Shadow Secretary of State for Culture, Media and Sport by Watson.
- John Healey, who had resigned as Shadow Secretary of State for Housing in the previous June reshuffle, returned and was promoted to Shadow Secretary of State for Housing.
- Paul Flynn retired from Shadow Cabinet and was replaced as Shadow Leader of the House of Commons by Valerie Vaz, and as Shadow Secretary of State for Wales by Jo Stevens.
- Shami Chakrabarti was ennobled and appointed as Shadow Attorney General, which had been vacant since Karl Turner's resignation in June.
- Rosie Winterton was replaced as Shadow Chief Whip of the House of Commons by Nick Brown.
- Barbara Keeley was appointed Shadow Minister for Mental Health, which had been vacant since Luciana Berger's resignation in June.
- Dawn Butler was appointed to a new post as Shadow Minister for Black and Minority Ethnic Communities.
- Ashworth was replaced as Shadow Minister without Portfolio by Andrew Gwynne.

== February 2017 reshuffle ==
=== Resignations ===
On Thursday 19 January, Jeremy Corbyn was reported to be preparing to order Labour MPs to vote to support triggering Article 50 in the vote on the European Union (Notification of Withdrawal) Bill 2017, in line with a three-line whip. This triggered the following resignations from the frontbench (in chronological order):

On Thursday 26 January:

- Tulip Siddiq – Shadow Minister for Early Years (not in Shadow Cabinet)

On Friday 27 January:

- Jo Stevens – Shadow Welsh Secretary

On Wednesday 1 February:

- Dawn Butler – Shadow Minister for Diverse Communities
- Rachael Maskell – Shadow Secretary of State for Environment, Food and Rural Affairs

On Wednesday 8 February:

- Clive Lewis – Shadow Secretary of State for Business, Energy and Industrial Strategy

=== Replacements ===
- Clive Lewis was replaced by Rebecca Long-Bailey as Shadow Business Secretary
  - Rebecca Long-Bailey was replaced by Peter Dowd as Shadow Chief Secretary to the Treasury
- Rachael Maskell was replaced by Sue Hayman as Shadow Environment Secretary
- Jo Stevens was replaced by Christina Rees as Shadow Welsh Secretary

== June 2017 reshuffles ==
Following the 2017 general election, Corbyn began a reshuffle of his shadow cabinet:

On 14 June 2017:

- Emily Thornberry was appointed Shadow First Secretary of State;
- Owen Smith was appointed Shadow Secretary of State for Northern Ireland;
- Andrew Gwynne was appointed Shadow Secretary of State for Communities and Local Government;
- Dawn Butler was appointed Shadow Minister for Diverse Communities;
- Lesley Laird was appointed Shadow Secretary of State for Scotland.

Later that month, Corbyn sacked three shadow ministers (Ruth Cadbury, Catherine West and Andy Slaughter) and a fourth (Daniel Zeichner) resigned. This was after they had rebelled against party orders to abstain in the vote on a motion that was proposed by the then Labour MP Chuka Umunna and was aimed at keeping the UK in the EU single market.

== August 2017 ==
Dawn Butler was appointed Shadow Secretary of State for Women and Equalities, replacing Sarah Champion.

== October 2017 ==
Richard Corbett was elected Leader of the European Parliamentary Labour Party, replacing Glenis Willmott and attending Shadow Cabinet meetings.

== January 2018 ==
Tommy McAvoy was elected Opposition Chief Whip in the House of Lords, replacing Steve Bassam.

== March 2018 ==
Debbie Abrahams, Shadow Secretary of State for Work and Pensions, was sacked. She was replaced by Margaret Greenwood. Owen Smith, Shadow Secretary of State for Northern Ireland, was sacked. He was replaced by Tony Lloyd.

== December 2018 ==
Kate Osamor, Shadow Secretary of State for International Development, resigned. She was replaced by Dan Carden.

== January 2020 ==
=== 2020 post-election cabinet reshuffle ===
In the 2019 general election, a number of Shadow Ministers lost their seats; mostly to Boris Johnson's Conservatives. The following replacement appointments were made.

- Sue Hayman was replaced as Shadow Secretary of State for Environment, Food and Rural Affairs by Luke Pollard.
- Laura Pidcock was replaced as Shadow Secretary of State for Employment Rights by Rachael Maskell.
- Lesley Laird was replaced as Shadow Secretary of State for Scotland by Tony Lloyd.
- Liz McInnes was replaced as Shadow Foreign Office Minister for South Asia, Sub-Saharan Africa and the Commonwealth by Afzal Khan.
- Jenny Chapman was replaced as Shadow Brexit Minister by Thangam Debbonaire.
- Jo Platt was replaced as Shadow Minister of State for the Cabinet Office by Cat Smith.

As Tom Watson stood down at the election, he was replaced as Shadow Secretary of State for Digital, Culture, Media and Sport by Tracy Brabin.

Newcomer MP Bell Ribeiro-Addy was immediately appointed Shadow Minister for Immigration.

=== Positions without successors ===
- Karen Lee was not replaced as Shadow Fire and Rescue Services Minister.
- David Drew was not replaced as Shadow Farming and Rural Communities Minister
- Sandy Martin was not replaced as Shadow Minister for Waste and Recycling.
- Danielle Rowley was not replaced as Shadow Minister for Climate Justice and Green Jobs.
- Paula Sherriff was not replaced as Shadow Minister for Social Care and Mental Health.
- Paul Sweeney was not replaced as Shadow Scotland Minister.

== See also ==
- Starmer shadow cabinet
- His Majesty's Most Loyal Opposition
- Official Opposition frontbench
- Cabinet of the United Kingdom
- British Government frontbench
- Liberal Democrat frontbench team
- Frontbench Team of Ian Blackford
