= May 2021 British shadow cabinet reshuffle =

UK shadow cabinet reshuffle

In the aftermath of relatively poor results in the 2021 local elections, Labour leader Keir Starmer carried out a May 2021 shadow cabinet reshuffle.

Starmer dismissed Angela Rayner as Chair of the Labour Party and National Campaign Coordinator following the elections. The move was criticised by John McDonnell, former Shadow Chancellor of the Exchequer, and Andy Burnham, Mayor of Greater Manchester.

The major outcome of the reshuffle was the demotion of the Shadow Chancellor, Anneliese Dodds. Rachel Reeves was appointed as the new Shadow Chancellor and Angela Rayner succeeded Reeves as Shadow Chancellor of the Duchy of Lancaster. Nick Brown was dismissed as Chief Whip and replaced by his deputy, Alan Campbell. Valerie Vaz departed as Shadow Leader of the House of Commons and was replaced by Thangam Debbonaire, who in turn was succeeded as Shadow Secretary of State for Housing by Lucy Powell.

On 11 May 2021, Starmer's parliamentary private secretary (PPS) Carolyn Harris resigned, which The Times reported was after allegedly spreading false rumours about the private life of Angela Rayner prior to her dismissal. Sharon Hodgson was appointed as Starmer's new PPS.

== Cabinet-level changes ==
Colour key
- Joined the Shadow Cabinet
- Left the Shadow Cabinet
- Portfolio created/renamed

Minister	Position(s) before reshuffle	Position(s) after reshuffle
Rt Hon Angela Rayner MP	Shadow First Secretary of State; Deputy Leader of the Labour Party (Note: Non-ministerial position); Chair of the Labour Party; Labour Party National Campaign Coordinator	Shadow First Secretary of State; Deputy Leader of the Labour Party; Shadow Chancellor of the Duchy of Lancaster; Shadow Secretary of State for the Future of Work
Rachel Reeves MP	Shadow Chancellor of the Duchy of Lancaster	Shadow Chancellor of the Exchequer
Anneliese Dodds MP	Shadow Chancellor of the Exchequer	Chair of the Labour Party
Shabana Mahmood MP	Backbench MP	Labour Party National Campaign Coordinator
Rt Hon Nick Brown MP	Chief Whip of the Labour Party	Left the Opposition frontbench
Rt Hon Sir Alan Campbell MP	Deputy Chief Whip of the Labour Party	Chief Whip of the Labour Party
Rt Hon Valerie Vaz MP	Shadow Leader of the House of Commons	Left the Opposition frontbench
Thangam Debbonaire MP	Shadow Secretary of State for Housing	Shadow Leader of the House of Commons
Lucy Powell MP	Shadow Minister of State for Business and Consumers	Shadow Secretary of State for Housing
Rosena Allin-Khan MP	Shadow Minister for Mental Health (Note: Attending Shadow Cabinet)	Shadow Secretary of State for Mental Health
Wes Streeting MP	Shadow Minister for Schools	Shadow Secretary of State for Child Poverty
Cat Smith MP	Shadow Minister for Voter Engagement and Youth Affairs	Shadow Secretary of State for Young People and Democracy

== Junior changes ==
The following junior changes were made on 14 May:

- Olivia Blake becomes Shadow Minister for Nature, Water and Flooding
- Sharon Hodgson becomes parliamentary private secretary to the Leader of the Opposition
- Stephanie Peacock becomes Shadow Minister for Veterans
- Carolyn Harris resigned as parliamentary private secretary to the Leader of the Opposition
- Peter Kyle becomes Shadow Minister for Schools
- Anna McMorrin replaces Peter Kyle as Shadow Minister for Victims and Youth Justice
- Andy McDonald becomes Shadow Secretary of State for Employment Rights and Protections
- Seema Malhotra becomes Shadow Minister for Business and Consumers
- Florence Eshalomi becomes parliamentary private secretary to Angela Rayner
- Kate Hollern resigns as Shadow Minister for Local Government
- Jeff Smith becomes Shadow Minister for Local Government
- Chris Evans replaces Khalid Mahmood as Shadow Minister for Defence Procurement
- Ruth Cadbury replaces Mike Amesbury as Shadow Minister for Planning
- Bambos Charalambous and Holly Lynch swapped roles
- Paul Blomfield leaves the frontbench

== Reaction ==
=== Alleged sacking of Angela Rayner ===
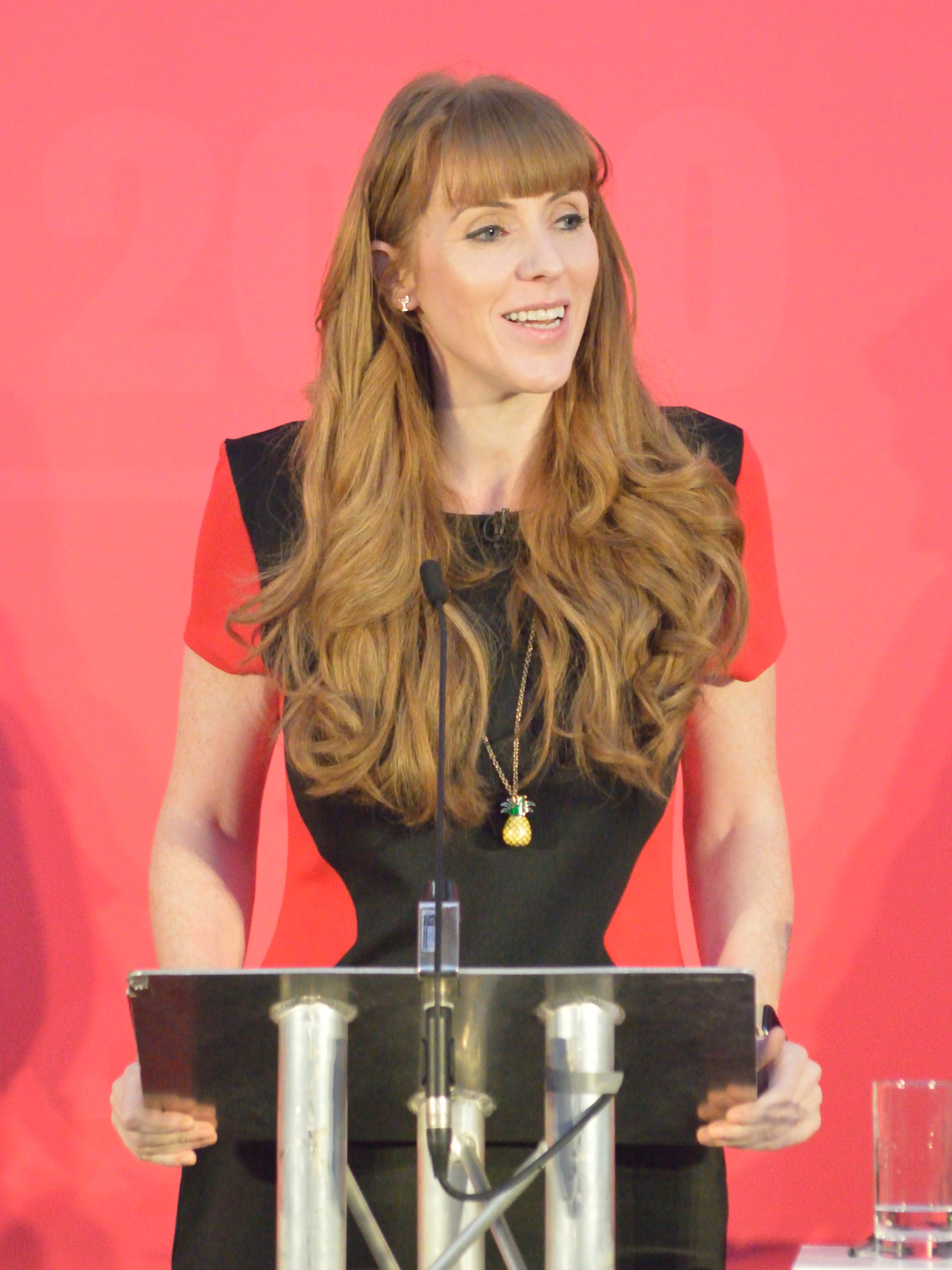
Rayner at a deputy leadership hustings in 2020

The decision to replace Angela Rayner as Party Chair and Party National Campaign Coordinator was leaked by an unknown source as a sacking and that was received negatively by Labour MPs and members. Reports of the change were leaked on 8 May, leading to accusations that Starmer was attempting to shift blame for Labour's election defeats onto his deputy. Former Shadow Chancellor, John McDonnell, tweeted that he was "scapegoating everyone apart from himself" and demonstrating "a cowardly avoidance of responsibility". Andy Burnham, who had been re-elected as Mayor of Greater Manchester two days prior, also tweeted his disproval by stating that "If it's so I can’t support this". Burnham's statement, along with comments he had recently made that were critical of the party's "London-centric" focus, was perceived by some as a direct attack on Starmer's leadership.

The announcement of the new shadow cabinet was delayed as they always are while the changes were discussed. Although she was ultimately replaced as Party Chair (by Anneliese Dodds) and National Campaign Co-ordinator (by Shabana Mahmood), Rayner's position on the frontbench was seen to have been strengthened, as she was appointed Shadow Chancellor of the Duchy of Lancaster, shadowing prominent Conservative Michael Gove, and given the newly created role of Shadow Secretary of State for the Future of Work.

=== Dismissal of Nick Brown ===
One of the two shadow cabinet members to leave the Opposition frontbench was Nick Brown, who had served as Chief Whip of the Labour Party under five different leaders. A spokesperson for Brown stated that the decision had been amicable and that he and Starmer had parted "on good terms, with mutual respect". However, this move was criticised as "inept in the extreme" by John McDonnell, who noted Brown's experience, calling him "one of the most experienced and tactically astute chief whips the party has ever had". McDonnell further alleged that the decision was orchestrated by Peter Mandelson, the influential former minister during the New Labour governments.

=== Other rumoured changes ===
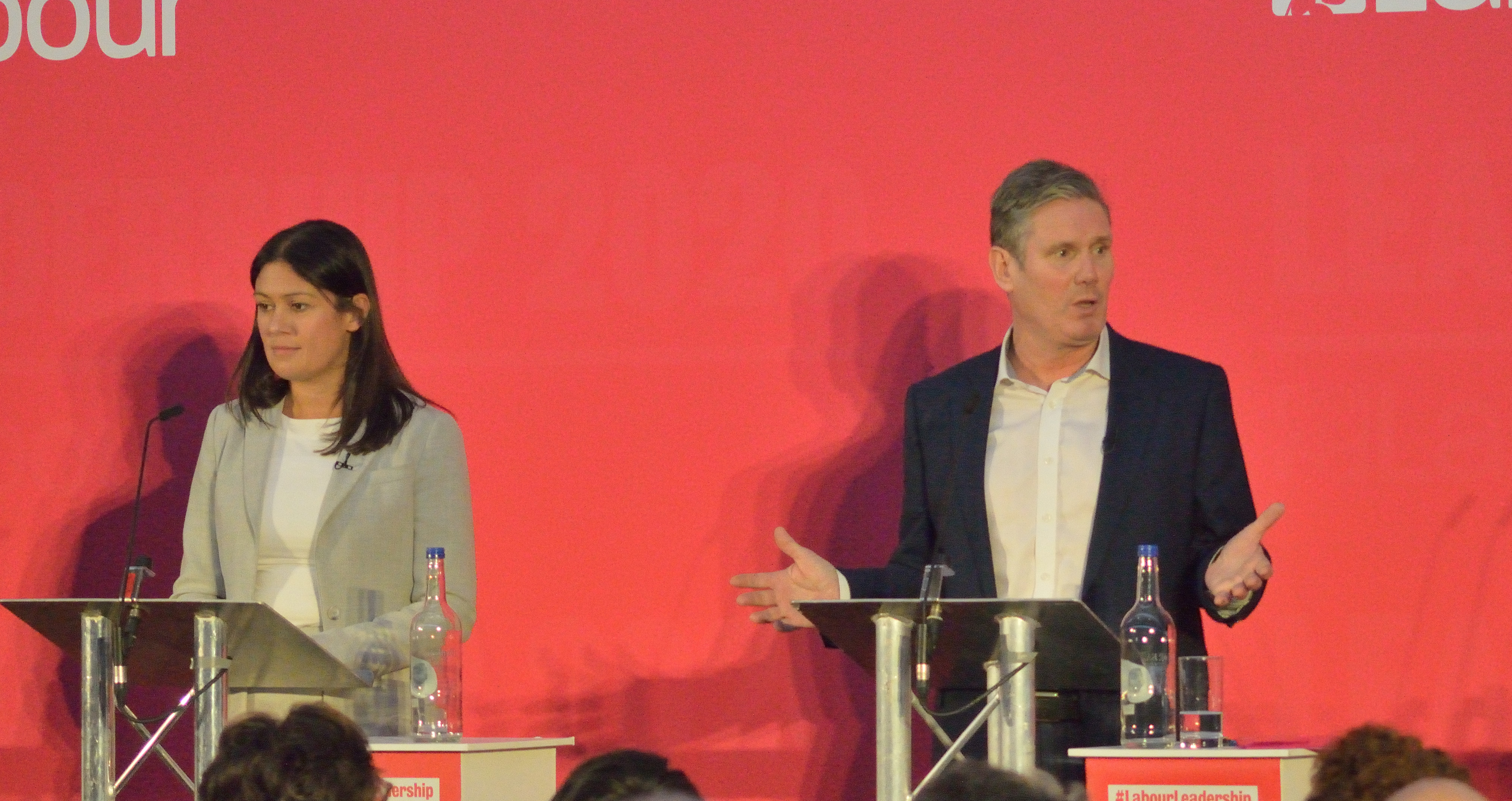
Nandy (left) and Starmer (right) during a leadership hustings in 2020

The day before the reshuffle, there were rumours leaked that Starmer was planning to demote and replace a number of senior members of his shadow cabinet, including Lisa Nandy, the Shadow Foreign Secretary. This was heavily criticised both inside and outside the Labour Party, as Nandy is seen as one of the more visible and vocal members of the shadow cabinet representing the North of England. It was suggested that she had been disloyal to Starmer and was being demoted as a result. However, Robert Peston of ITV tweeted that the accusations against Nandy appeared to represent "bunker mentality" and that signs of disloyalty had been "invisible" to him.

There was also widespread speculation that Starmer was planning to promote several senior MPs who had previously served in New Labour cabinets and subsequent shadow cabinets. Hilary Benn and Yvette Cooper were tipped to return, indicating an attempt to reintroduce experienced and well-known politicians to the frontbench. Benn had been Shadow Foreign Secretary in Jeremy Corbyn's first shadow cabinet, until June 2016 when he was dismissed. Cooper had been Shadow Home Secretary in Ed Miliband's shadow cabinet and stood down when Corbyn was elected leader in September 2015. Both had served in the New Labour governments of Tony Blair and Gordon Brown.

When the new shadow cabinet was eventually announced on 9 May, Nandy remained in her post, alongside the majority of her colleagues. Neither Benn nor Cooper were appointed as they hold Chairs of Parliamentary Select Committees.

== See also ==
- Shadow Cabinet of Keir Starmer
- Official Opposition frontbench
- November 2021 British shadow cabinet reshuffle
- 2023 British shadow cabinet reshuffle
- 2025 British shadow cabinet reshuffle
