= Shadow Cabinet of Harriet Harman =

Shadow Cabinet of Harriet Harman may refer to either of two United Kingdom Shadow Cabinets formed by Harriet Harman in separate stints as acting Leader of the Labour Party:

- First Shadow Cabinet of Harriet Harman, following the resignation of Gordon Brown as Labour Leader following the party's loss at the 2010 general election
- Second Shadow Cabinet of Harriet Harman, formed after Ed Miliband resigned as leader in the wake of the 2015 general election
