= List of prime ministers of the United Kingdom by experience =

This article lists which other significant offices have been held by the prime ministers before and after they have come to power as Prime Minister of the United Kingdom. The positions and amount of experience a prime minister has acquired has changed over the years, with modern prime ministers having gained experience through leading the opposition, while earlier prime ministers would be more likely to have held roles within the government. Usually a prime minister does not hold high office again after leaving the role. However, there are some cases where individuals have gone on to hold senior roles in future administrations.

== Prime ministers ==
=== Robert Walpole ===
- Secretaries at war 1708-1710
- Treasurer of the Navy 1710-1711
- Paymaster of the Forces 1714-1715
- Chancellor of the Exchequer 1715-1717
- Paymaster of the Forces 1720-1721
- Chancellor of the Exchequer 1721-1742
- Prime Minister 1721-1742

=== Spencer Compton, 1st Earl of Wilmington ===
- Paymaster of Pensions 1707-1713
- Speaker of the House of Commons 1715-1727
- Paymaster of the Forces 1722-1730
- Lord President of the Council 1730-1742
- Prime Minister 1742-1743

=== Henry Pelham ===
- Secretaries at war 1724-1730
- Paymaster of the Forces 1730-1743
- Chancellor of the Exchequer 1743-1754
- Prime Minister 1743-1754

=== Thomas Pelham-Holles, 1st Duke of Newcastle ===
- Lord Chamberlain 1717-1724
- Secretary of State for the Southern Department 1724-1748
- Secretary of State for the Northern Department 1748-1754
- Prime Minister 1754-1756
- Prime Minister 1757-1762
- Lord Keeper of the Privy Seal 1765-1766

=== William Cavendish, 4th Duke of Devonshire ===
- Master of the Horse 1751-1755
- Lord Lieutenant of Ireland 1755-1757
- Prime Minister 1756-1757
- Lord Chamberlain 1757-1762

=== John Stuart, 3rd Earl of Bute ===
- Secretary of State for the Northern Department 1761-1762
- Leader of the House of Lords 1762-1763
- Prime Minister 1762-1763

=== George Grenville ===
- Treasurer of the Navy 1754-1756
- Treasurer of the Navy 1756-1762
- Secretary of State for the Northern Department 1962
- Chancellor of the Exchequer 1763-1765
- Prime Minister 1763-1765

=== Charles Watson-Wentworth, 2nd Marquess of Rockingham ===
- Lord of the Bedchamber 1751-1760
- Lord Lieutenant of Yorkshire 1751-1763
- Lord of the Bedchamber 1760-1762
- Lord Lieutenant of Yorkshire 1765-1782
- Prime Minister 1765-1766
- Leader of the House of Lords 1765-1766
- Prime Minister 1782
- Leader of the House of Lords 1782

=== William Pitt the Elder ===
- Paymaster of the Forces 1746-1755
- Leader of the House of Commons 1756-1757
- Secretary of State for the Southern Department 1756-1757
- Leader of the House of Commons 1757-1761
- Secretary of State for the Southern Department 1757-1761
- Prime Minister 1766-1768

=== Augustus Fitzroy, 3rd Duke of Grafton ===
- Secretary of State for the Northern Department 1765-1766
- Prime Minister 1768-1770
- Lord Keeper of the Privy Seal 1771-1775
- Lord Keeper of the Privy Seal 1782-1783

=== Frederick North, Lord North ===
- Chancellor of the Exchequer 1767-1782
- Leader of the House of Commons 1768-1782
- Prime Minister 1770-1782
- Secretary of State for Home Affairs 1783
- Leader of the House of Commons 1783

=== William Petty, 2nd Earl of Shelburne ===
- First Lord of Trade 1763
- Secretary of State for the Southern Department 1766-1768
- Home Secretary 1782
- Leader of the House of Commons 1782-1783
- Prime Minister 1782-1783

=== William Cavendish-Bentinck, 3rd Duke of Portland ===
- Lord Chamberlain 1765-1766
- Lord Lieutenant of Ireland 1782
- Prime Minister 1783
- Home Secretary 1794-1801
- Lord President of the Council 1801-1805
- Prime Minister 1807-1809

=== William Pitt the Younger ===
- Chancellor of the Exchequer 1782-1783
- Leader of the House of Commons 1783-1801
- Prime Minister 1783-1801
- Chancellor of the Exchequer 1804-1806
- Prime Minister 1804-1806

=== Henry Addington ===
- Speaker of the House of Commons 1789-1801
- Leader of the House of Commons 1801-1804
- Prime Minister 1801-1804
- Lord President of the Council 1805
- Lord Keeper of the Privy Seal 1806
- Lord President of the Council 1806-1807
- Home Secretary 1812-1822

=== William Grenville ===
- Paymaster of the Forces 1784-1789
- Speaker of the House of Commons 1789
- Home Secretary 1789-1791
- Foreign Secretary 1791-1801
- Prime Minister 1806-1807
- Leader of the Opposition (House of Lords) 1807-1817

=== Spencer Perceval ===
- Solicitor General of England Wales 1801-1802
- Attorney General for England and Wales 1802-1806
- Chancellor of the Duchy of Lancaster 1806-1807
- Leader of the House of Commons 1807-1812
- Chancellor of the Exchequer 1807-1812
- Prime Minister 1809-1812

=== Robert Jenkinson, 2nd Earl of Liverpool ===
- Master of the Mint 1799-1801
- Foreign Secretary 1801-1804
- Home Secretary 1804-1806
- Home Secretary 1807-1809
- Leader of the House of Lords 1807-1827
- Secretary of State for War 1809-1812
- Prime Minister 1812-1827

=== George Canning ===
- Commissioner of the Board of Control for India 1799-1801
- Treasury of the Navy 1804-1806
- Foreign Secretary 1807-1809
- President of the Board of Control 1816-1821
- Foreign Secretary 1822-1827
- Leader of the House of Commons 1822-1827
- Chancellor of the Exchequer 1827
- Prime Minister 1827

=== Frederick John Robinson, 1st Viscount Goderich ===
- President of the Board of Trade 1818-1823
- Chancellor of the Exchequer 1823-1827
- Prime Minister 1827-1828
- Colonial Office 1830-1833
- Lord Keeper of the Privy Seal 1833-1834
- President of the Board of Trade 1843-1846

=== Arthur Wellesley, 1st Duke of Wellington ===
- Master General of the Ordnance 1819-1827
- Commander-in-Chief of the Forces 1827-1828
- Leader of the Opposition (House of Lords) 1827-1828
- Leader of the House of Lords 1828-1830
- Prime Minister 1828-1830
- Leader of the Opposition (House of Lords) 1830-1834
- Secretary of State for War 1834
- Home Secretary 1834
- Foreign Secretary 1834-1835
- Leader of the House of Lords 1834-1835
- Prime Minister 1834
- Leader of the Opposition (House of Lords) 1835-1841
- Leader of the House of Lords 1841-1846
- Commander-in-Chief of the Forces 1842-1852

=== Charles Grey ===
- First Lord of the Admiralty 1806
- Leader of the House of Commons 1806-1807
- Foreign Secretary 1806-1807
- Leader of the Opposition (House of Lords) 1817-1821
- Leader of the House of Lords 1830-1834
- Prime Minister 1830-1834

=== William Lamb, 2nd Viscount Melbourne ===
- Chief Secretary for Ireland 1827-1828
- Home Secretary 1830-1834
- Leader of the House of Lords 1834
- Prime Minister 1834
- Leader of the Opposition (House of Lords) 1835
- Leader of the House of Lords 1841-42
- Prime Minister 1835-1841

=== Robert Peel ===
- Chief Secretary for Ireland 1812-1818
- Home Secretary 1822-1827
- Leader of the Opposition 1827-1828
- Home Secretary 1828-1830
- Leader of the Opposition 1830-1834
- Prime Minister 1835
- Chancellor of the Exchequer 1835
- Leader of the Opposition 1835-1841
- Prime Minister 1841-1846

=== John Russell ===
- Paymaster of the Forces 1830-1834
- Leader of the Opposition 1834-1835
- Home Secretary 1835-1839
- Secretary of State for War 1839-1841
- Leader of the Opposition 1841-1846
- Prime Minister 1846-1852
- Leader of the Opposition 1852
- Foreign Secretary 1852-1853
- Lord President of the Council 1854-1855
- Secretary of State for the Colonies 1855
- Foreign Secretary 1859-1865
- Prime Minister 1865-66
- Leader of the Opposition (House of Lords) 1866-68

=== Edward Smith-Stanley, 14th Earl of Derby ===
- Chief Secretary for Ireland 1830-1833
- Secretary of State for War and the Colonies 1833-1834
- Secretary of State for War and the Colonies 1841-1845
- Prime Minister 1852
- Leader of the Opposition (House of Lords) 1852-1858
- Prime Minister 1858-1859
- Leader of the Opposition (House of Lords) 1859-1866
- Prime Minister 1866-1868

=== George Hamilton-Gordon, 4th Earl of Aberdeen ===
- Chancellor of the Duchy of Lancaster 1828
- Foreign Secretary 1828-1830
- Secretary of State for War and Colonies 1834-1835
- Foreign Secretary 1841-1846
- Prime Minister 1852-1855

=== Henry John Temple, 3rd Viscount Palmerston ===
- Secretary of War 1809-1828
- Foreign Secretary 1830-1834
- Foreign Secretary 1835-1841
- Foreign Secretary 1846-1851
- Home Secretary 1852-1855
- Prime Minister 1855-1858
- Leader of the Opposition 1858-1859
- Prime Minister 1859-1865

=== Benjamin Disraeli ===
- Leader of the Opposition 1849-1852
- Leader of the House of Commons 1852
- Chancellor of the Exchequer 1852
- Leader of the Opposition 1852-1858
- Leader of the House of Commons 1858-1859
- Chancellor of the Exchequer 1858-1859
- Leader of the Opposition 1859-1866
- Leader of the House of Commons 1866-1868
- Chancellor of the Exchequer 1866-1868
- Prime Minister 1868
- Leader of the Opposition 1868-1874
- Prime Minister 1874-1880
- Leader of the Opposition (House of Lords) 1880-1881

=== William Ewart Gladstone ===
- President of the Board of Trade 1843-1845
- Secretary of State for War and Colonies 1845-1846
- Chancellor of the Exchequer 1852-1855
- Chancellor of the Exchequer 1859-1866
- Leader of the Opposition 1866-1868
- Prime Minister 1868-1874
- Chancellor of the Exchequer 1873-1874
- Leader of the Opposition 1874-1875
- Prime Minister 1880-1885
- Leader of the Opposition 1885-1886
- Prime Minister 1886
- Leader of the Opposition 1886-1892
- Chancellor of the Exchequer 1892-1894
- Prime Minister 1892-1894

=== Robert Gascoyne-Cecil, 3rd Marquess of Salisbury ===
- Secretary of State for India 1874-1878
- Foreign Secretary 1878-1880
- Leader of the Opposition (House of Lords) 1881-1885
- Foreign Secretary 1885-1886
- Prime Minister 1885-1886
- Leader of the Opposition (House of Lords) 1886
- Prime Minister 1886-1892
- Foreign Secretary 1887-1892
- Leader of the Opposition (House of Lords) 1892-1895
- Foreign Secretary 1895-1900
- Prime Minister 1895-1902
- Lord Keeper of the Privy Seal 1900-1902

=== Archibald Primrose, 5th Earl of Rosebery ===
- First Commissioner of Works 1885
- Lord Keeper of the Privy Seal 1885
- Foreign Secretary 1886
- Foreign Secretary 1892-1894
- Lord President of the Council 1894-1895
- Prime Minister 1894-1895
- Leader of the Opposition (House of Lords) 1895

=== Arthur Balfour ===
- Secretary for Scotland 1886-1887
- Chief Secretary for Ireland 1887-1891
- Leader of the House of Commons 1891-1892
- Leader of the Opposition 1892-1895
- Leader of the House of Commons 1895-1905
- Lord Keeper of the Privy Seal 1902-1903
- Prime Minister 1902-1905
- Leader of the Opposition 1905-1906
- Leader of the Opposition 1906-1911
- First Lord of the Admiralty 1915-1916
- Foreign Secretary 1916-1919
- Lord President of the Council 1919-1922
- Lord President of the Council 1925-1929

=== Henry Campbell-Bannerman ===
- Secretary to the Admiralty 1882-1884
- Chief Secretary for Ireland 1884-1885
- Secretary of State for War 1886
- Secretary of State for War 1892-1895
- Leader of the Opposition 1899-1905
- Prime Minister 1905-1908

=== Herbert Henry Asquith ===
- Home Secretary 1892-1895
- Chancellor of the Exchequer 1905-1908
- Prime Minister 1908-1916
- Secretary of State for War 1914
- Leader of the Opposition 1916-1918
- Leader of the Opposition 1920-1922

=== David Lloyd George ===
- President of the Board of Trade 1905-1908
- Chancellor of the Exchequer 1908-1915
- Minister of Munitions 1915-1916
- Secretary of State for War 1916
- Prime Minister 1916-1922

=== Bonar Law ===
- Leader of the Opposition 1911-1915
- Secretary of State for the Colonies 1915-1916
- Leader of the House of Commons 1916-1921
- Chancellor of the Exchequer 1916-1919
- Lord Keeper of the Privy Seal 1919-1921
- Leader of the House of Commons 1922-1923
- Prime Minister 1922-1923

=== Stanley Baldwin ===
- Financial Secretary to the Treasury 1917-1921
- President of the Board of Trade 1921-1922
- Chancellor of the Exchequer 1922-1923
- Prime Minister 1923-1924
- Leader of the Opposition 1924
- Prime Minister 1924-1929
- Leader of the Opposition 1929-1931
- Lord President of the Council 1931-1935
- Prime Minister 1935-1937

=== Ramsay MacDonald ===
- Leader of the Opposition 1922-1924
- Leader of the House of Commons 1924
- Foreign Secretary 1924
- Prime Minister 1924
- Leader of the Opposition 1924-1929
- Leader of the House of Commons 1929-1935
- Prime Minister 1929-1935
- Lord President of the Council 1935-1937

=== Neville Chamberlain ===
- Postmaster General 1922-1923
- Minister of Health 1923
- Chancellor of the Exchequer 1923-1924
- Minister of Health 1924-1929
- Minister of Health 1931
- Chancellor of the Exchequer 1931-1937
- Prime Minister 1937-1940
- Lord President of the Council 1940

=== Winston Churchill ===
- President of the Board of Trade 1908-1910
- Home Secretary 1910-1911
- First Lord of the Admiralty 1911-1915
- Minister of Munitions 1917-1919
- Secretary of State for Air 1919-1921
- Secretary of State for War 1919-1921
- Secretary of State for the Colonies 1921-1922
- Chancellor of the Exchequer 1924-1929
- First Lord of the Admiralty 1939-1940
- Minister of Defence 1940-1945
- Prime Minister 1940-1945
- Leader of the Opposition 1945-1951
- Minister of Defence 1951-1952
- Prime Minister 1951-1955

=== Clement Attlee ===
- Chancellor of the Duchy of Lancaster 1931
- Postmaster General 1931
- Leader of the Opposition 1935-1940
- Lord Keeper of the Privy Council 1940-1942
- Secretary of State for Dominion Affairs 1942-1943
- Deputy Prime Minister 1942-1945
- Lord President of the Council 1943-1945
- Leader of the Opposition 1945
- Prime Minister 1945-1951
- Leader of the Opposition 1951-1955

=== Anthony Eden ===
- Lord Keeper of the Privy Seal 1933-1935
- Foreign Secretary 1935-1938
- Secretary of State for Dominion Affairs 1939-1940
- Secretary of State for War 1940
- Foreign Secretary 1940-1945
- Leader of the House of Commons 1942-1945
- Deputy Prime Minister 1951-1955
- Foreign Secretary 1951-1955
- Prime Minister 1955-1957

=== Harold Macmillan ===
- Secretary of State for Air 1945
- Minister of Housing 1951-1954
- Minister of Defence 1954-1955
- Foreign Secretary 1955
- Chancellor of the Exchequer 1955-1957
- Prime Minister 1957-1963

=== Alec Douglas-Home ===
- Minister of State for Scotland 1951-1955
- Secretary of State for the Commonwealth 1955-1960
- Lord President of the Council 1957
- Leader of the House of Lords 1957-1960
- Lord President of the Council 1959-1960
- Foreign Secretary 1960-1963
- Prime Minister 1963-1964
- Leader of the Opposition 1964-1965
- Shadow Foreign Secretary 1974
- Foreign Secretary 1970-1974

=== Harold Wilson ===
- Secretary for Overseas Trade 1947
- President of the Board of Trade 1947-1951
- Shadow Chancellor of the Exchequer 1955-1961
- Shadow Foreign Secretary 1961-1963
- Leader of the Opposition 1963-1964
- Prime Minister 1964-1970
- Leader of the Opposition 1970-1974
- Prime Minister 1974-1976

=== Edward Heath ===
- Chief Whip 1955-1959
- Minister of Labour 1959-1960
- Lord Keeper of the Privy Seal 1960-1963
- President of the Board of Trade 1963-1964
- Secretary of State for Industry 1963-1964
- Shadow Chancellor of the Exchequer 1965
- Leader of the Opposition 1965-1970
- Prime Minister 1970-1974
- Leader of the Opposition 1974-1975

=== James Callaghan ===
- Shadow Chancellor of the Exchequer 1961-1964
- Chancellor of the Exchequer 1964-1967
- Home Secretary 1967-1970
- Shadow Home Secretary 1970-1971
- Shadow Foreign Secretary 1972-1974
- Foreign Secretary 1974-1976
- Prime Minister 1976-1979
- Leader of the Opposition 1979-1980

=== Margaret Thatcher ===
- Shadow Education Secretary 1967-1970
- Education Secretary 1970-1974
- Shadow Environment Secretary 1974-1975
- Leader of the Opposition 1975-1979
- Prime Minister 1979-1990

=== John Major ===
- Minister of State for Social Security 1986-1987
- Chief Secretary to the Treasury 1987-1989
- Foreign Secretary 1989
- Chancellor of the Exchequer 1989-1990
- Prime Minister 1990-1997
- Leader of the Opposition 1997
- Shadow Foreign Secretary 1997

=== Tony Blair ===
- Shadow Minister for Trade 1987-1988
- Shadow Energy Secretary 1988-1989
- Shadow Employment Secretary 1989-1992
- Shadow Home Secretary 1992-1994
- Leader of the Opposition 1994-1997
- Prime Minister 1997-2007

=== Gordon Brown ===
- Shadow Chief Secretary to the Treasury 1987-1989
- Shadow Trade and Industry Secretary 1989-1992
- Shadow Chancellor of the Exchequer 1992-1997
- Chancellor of the Exchequer 1997-2007
- Prime Minister 2007-2010

=== David Cameron ===
- Conservative Policy Review Coordinator 2004-2005
- Shadow Education and Skills Secretary 2005-2005
- Leader of the Opposition 2005-2010
- Prime Minister 2010-2016
- Foreign Secretary 2023-2024

=== Theresa May ===
- Shadow Education and Employment Secretary 1998-2001
- Shadow Women and Equality Minister 1998-2001
- Shadow Transport Secretary 2001-2002
- Chairman of the Conservative Party 2002-2003
- Shadow Environment, Food and Rural Affairs Secretary 2003-2004
- Shadow Transport Secretary 2003-2004
- Shadow Family Secretary 2004-2005
- Shadow Culture, Media and Sport Secretary 2005-2005
- Shadow Leader of the House of Commons 2005-2009
- Shadow Women and Equality Minister 2007-2010
- Shadow Work and Pensions Secretary 2009-2010
- Minister for Women and Equalities 2010-2012
- Home Secretary 2010-2016
- Prime Minister 2016-2019
- Commonwealth Chair-in-Office 2018-2019

=== Boris Johnson ===
- Mayor of London 2008-2016
- Foreign Secretary 2016-2018
- Leader of the Conservative Party 2019-2022
- Commonwealth Chair-in-Office 2019-2022
- Prime Minister 2019-2022
- Minister for the Union 2019-2022

=== Liz Truss ===
- Parliamentary Under-Secretary of State for Childcare and Education 2012-2014
- Secretary of State for Environment, Food and Rural Affairs 2014-2016
- Secretary of State for Justice 2016-2017
- Lord Chancellor 2016-2017
- Chief Secretary to the Treasury 2017-2019
- Secretary of State for International Trade 2019-2021
- President of the Board of Trade 2019-2021
- Minister for Women and Equalities 2019-2022
- Secretary of State for Foreign, Commonwealth and Development Affairs 2021-2022
- Leader of the Conservative Party 2022
- Minister for the Union 2022
- Prime Minister 2022

=== Rishi Sunak ===
- Parliamentary Under-Secretary of State for Local Government 2018–2019
- Chief Secretary to the Treasury 2019–2020
- Chancellor of the Exchequer 2020–2022
- Leader of the Conservative Party 2022–2024
- Minister for the Union 2022–2024
- Prime Minister 2022–2024

=== Keir Starmer ===
- Director of Public Prosecutions 2008–2013
- Shadow Minister for Immigration 2015–2016
- Shadow Secretary of State for Exiting the European Union 2016–2020
- Leader of the Opposition 2020–2024
- Prime Minister 2024–2026

=== Andy Burnham ===
- Parliamentary Under-Secretary of State for the Home Department 2005—2006
- Minister of State for Health 2006—2007
- Chief Secretary to the Treasury 2007—2008
- Secretary of State for Culture, Media and Sport 2008—2009
- Secretary of State for Health 2009—2010
- Shadow Secretary of State for Education 2010—2011
- Shadow Secretary of State for Health 2011—2015
- Shadow Home Secretary 2015—2016
- Mayor of Greater Manchester 2017—2026
- Prime Minister 2026–present

== Prime ministers sitting in cabinet after their premierships ==
| Name | Prime Minister | | Cabinet post | | | Prime Minister serving under |
|---|---|---|---|---|---|---|
| Thomas Pelham-Holles, 1st Duke of Newcastle-upon-Tyne (Created Duke of Newcastle-under-Lyne on 17 November 1756) | 16 March 1754 | 11 November 1756 | Lord Keeper of the Privy Seal | 30 July 1765 | 30 July 1766 | The Marquess of Rockingham (first term) |
| Thomas Pelham-Holles, 1st Duke of Newcastle-upon-Tyne (Created Duke of Newcastle-under-Lyne on 17 November 1756) | 29 June 1757 | 26 May 1762 | Lord Keeper of the Privy Seal | 30 July 1765 | 30 July 1766 | The Marquess of Rockingham (first term) |
| William Cavendish, 4th Duke of Devonshire | 16 November 1756 | 29 June 1757 | Lord Chamberlain of the Household | 1757 | 1762 | The Duke of Newcastle |
| William Cavendish, 4th Duke of Devonshire | 16 November 1756 | 29 June 1757 | Lord Chamberlain of the Household | 1757 | 1762 | The Earl of Bute |
| Augustus FitzRoy, 3rd Duke of Grafton | 14 October 1768 | 28 January 1770 | Lord Keeper of the Privy Seal | 12 June 1771 | 4 November 1775 | The Lord North |
| Augustus FitzRoy, 3rd Duke of Grafton | 14 October 1768 | 28 January 1770 | Lord Keeper of the Privy Seal | 27 March 1782 | 4 April 1783 | The Marquess of Rockingham (second term) |
| Augustus FitzRoy, 3rd Duke of Grafton | 14 October 1768 | 28 January 1770 | Lord Keeper of the Privy Seal | 27 March 1782 | 4 April 1783 | The Earl of Shelburne |
| Frederick North, Lord North (Became 2nd Earl of Guilford from 4 August 1790) | 28 January 1770 | 27 March 1782 | Home Secretary | 2 April 1783 | 19 December 1783 | The Duke of Portland (first term) |
| Frederick North, Lord North (Became 2nd Earl of Guilford from 4 August 1790) | 28 January 1770 | 27 March 1782 | Leader of the House of Commons | 2 April 1783 | 19 December 1783 | The Duke of Portland (first term) |
| William Cavendish-Bentinck, 3rd Duke of Portland | 2 April 1783 | 18 December 1783 | Home Secretary | 11 July 1794 | 30 July 1801 | William Pitt the Younger (first term) |
| William Cavendish-Bentinck, 3rd Duke of Portland | 2 April 1783 | 18 December 1783 | Home Secretary | 11 July 1794 | 30 July 1801 | Henry Addington |
| William Cavendish-Bentinck, 3rd Duke of Portland | 31 March 1807 | 4 October 1809 | Lord President of the Council | 30 July 1801 | 14 January 1805 | Henry Addington |
| William Cavendish-Bentinck, 3rd Duke of Portland | 31 March 1807 | 4 October 1809 | Lord President of the Council | 30 July 1801 | 14 January 1805 | William Pitt the Younger (second term) |
| Henry Addington (Created Viscount Sidmouth on 12 January 1805) | 17 March 1801 | 10 May 1804 | Lord President of the Council | 14 January 1805 | 10 July 1805 | William Pitt the Younger (second term) |
| Henry Addington (Created Viscount Sidmouth on 12 January 1805) | 17 March 1801 | 10 May 1804 | Lord Keeper of the Privy Seal | 5 February 1806 | 15 October 1806 | The Lord Grenville |
| Henry Addington (Created Viscount Sidmouth on 12 January 1805) | 17 March 1801 | 10 May 1804 | Lord President of the Council | 8 October 1806 | 26 March 1807 | The Lord Grenville |
| Henry Addington (Created Viscount Sidmouth on 12 January 1805) | 17 March 1801 | 10 May 1804 | Lord President of the Council | 8 April 1812 | 11 June 1812 | Spencer Perceval |
| Henry Addington (Created Viscount Sidmouth on 12 January 1805) | 17 March 1801 | 10 May 1804 | Lord President of the Council | 8 April 1812 | 11 June 1812 | The Earl of Liverpool |
| Henry Addington (Created Viscount Sidmouth on 12 January 1805) | 17 March 1801 | 10 May 1804 | Home Secretary | 11 June 1812 | 17 January 1822 | The Earl of Liverpool |
| F. J. Robinson, 1st Viscount Goderich (Created Earl of Ripon on 13 April 1833) | 31 August 1827 | 21 January 1828 | War and Colonial Secretary | 22 November 1830 | 3 April 1833 | The Earl Grey |
| F. J. Robinson, 1st Viscount Goderich (Created Earl of Ripon on 13 April 1833) | 31 August 1827 | 21 January 1828 | Lord Keeper of the Privy Seal | 3 April 1833 | 5 June 1834 | The Earl Grey |
| F. J. Robinson, 1st Viscount Goderich (Created Earl of Ripon on 13 April 1833) | 31 August 1827 | 21 January 1828 | President of the Board of Trade | 3 September 1841 | 15 May 1843 | Sir Robert Peel (second term) |
| F. J. Robinson, 1st Viscount Goderich (Created Earl of Ripon on 13 April 1833) | 31 August 1827 | 21 January 1828 | President of the Board of Control | 17 May 1843 | 30 June 1846 | Sir Robert Peel (second term) |
| Arthur Wellesley, 1st Duke of Wellington | 22 January 1828 | 16 November 1830 | Foreign Secretary | 17 November 1834 | 8 April 1835 | Himself as interim Prime Minister |
| Arthur Wellesley, 1st Duke of Wellington | 22 January 1828 | 16 November 1830 | Leader of the House of Lords | 17 November 1834 | 8 April 1835 | Sir Robert Peel (first term) |
| Arthur Wellesley, 1st Duke of Wellington | 17 November 1834 | 9 December 1834 | Leader of the House of Lords | 3 September 1841 | 27 June 1846 | Sir Robert Peel (second term) |
| Lord John Russell (Created Earl Russell on 30 July 1861) | 30 June 1846 | 21 February 1852 | Foreign Secretary | 28 December 1852 | 21 February 1853 | The Earl of Aberdeen |
| Lord John Russell (Created Earl Russell on 30 July 1861) | 29 October 1865 | 26 June 1866 | Leader of the House of Commons | 28 December 1852 | 30 January 1855 | The Earl of Aberdeen |
| Lord John Russell (Created Earl Russell on 30 July 1861) | 29 October 1865 | 26 June 1866 | Lord President of the Council | 12 June 1854 | 8 February 1855 | The Earl of Aberdeen |
| Lord John Russell (Created Earl Russell on 30 July 1861) | 29 October 1865 | 26 June 1866 | Colonial Secretary | 23 February 1855 | 21 July 1855 | The Lord Palmerston (first term) |
| Lord John Russell (Created Earl Russell on 30 July 1861) | 29 October 1865 | 26 June 1866 | Foreign Secretary | 18 June 1859 | 3 November 1865 | The Lord Palmerston (second term) |
| Arthur Balfour (Created Earl of Balfour on 5 May 1922) | 12 July 1902 | 4 December 1905 | First Lord of the Admiralty | 25 May 1915 | 10 December 1916 | H. H. Asquith |
| Arthur Balfour (Created Earl of Balfour on 5 May 1922) | 12 July 1902 | 4 December 1905 | First Lord of the Admiralty | 25 May 1915 | 10 December 1916 | David Lloyd George |
| Arthur Balfour (Created Earl of Balfour on 5 May 1922) | 12 July 1902 | 4 December 1905 | Foreign Secretary | 10 December 1916 | 23 October 1919 | David Lloyd George |
| Arthur Balfour (Created Earl of Balfour on 5 May 1922) | 12 July 1902 | 4 December 1905 | Lord President of the Council | 23 October 1919 | 19 October 1922 | David Lloyd George |
| Arthur Balfour (Created Earl of Balfour on 5 May 1922) | 12 July 1902 | 4 December 1905 | Lord President of the Council | 27 April 1925 | 4 June 1929 | Stanley Baldwin (second term) |
| Stanley Baldwin (Created Earl Baldwin of Bewdley on 8 June 1937) | 22 May 1923 | 22 January 1924 | Lord President of the Council | 25 August 1931 | 7 June 1935 | Ramsay MacDonald (second term) |
| Stanley Baldwin (Created Earl Baldwin of Bewdley on 8 June 1937) | 4 November 1924 | 4 June 1929 | Lord President of the Council | 25 August 1931 | 7 June 1935 | Ramsay MacDonald (second term) |
| Stanley Baldwin (Created Earl Baldwin of Bewdley on 8 June 1937) | 7 June 1935 | 28 May 1937 | Lord Keeper of the Privy Seal | 29 September 1932 | 31 December 1933 | Ramsay MacDonald (second term) |
| Ramsay MacDonald | 22 January 1924 | 4 November 1924 | Lord President of the Council | 7 June 1935 | 28 May 1937 | Stanley Baldwin (third term) |
| Ramsay MacDonald | 5 June 1929 | 7 June 1935 | Lord President of the Council | 7 June 1935 | 28 May 1937 | Stanley Baldwin (third term) |
| Neville Chamberlain | 28 May 1937 | 10 May 1940 | Lord President of the Council | 10 May 1940 | 29 September 1940 | Winston Churchill (first term) |
| Sir Alec Douglas-Home (Became 14th Earl of Home from 11 July 1951 and disclaimed the title on 23 October 1963) (Created Baron Home of the Hirsel for life on 19 December 1974) | 18 October 1963 | 16 October 1964 | Foreign Secretary | 20 June 1970 | 4 March 1974 | Edward Heath |
| David Cameron (Created Baron Cameron of Chipping Norton for life on 17 November 2023) | 11 May 2010 | 13 July 2016 | Foreign Secretary | 13 November 2023 | 5 July 2024 | Rishi Sunak |
