= Shadow Secretary of State for International Trade =

- Appointer: Leader of the Opposition
- Inaugural holder: Barry Gardiner
- Formation: 14 July 2016
- Abolished: 4 September 2023
- Website: The Shadow Cabinet

In British politics, the Shadow Secretary of State for International Trade was a position within the opposition's shadow cabinet that dealt with issues surrounding UK trade negotiations. If elected, the person designated as Shadow Secretary of State may have been slated to serve as the new Secretary of State. The final officeholder was Nick Thomas-Symonds.

== List of Shadow Secretaries of State for International Trade ==
Name	Portrait	Term of office		Length of term	Political party	Shadow Cabinet
Barry Gardiner		14 July 2016	6 April 2020	3 years, 267 days	Labour	Corbyn
Emily Thornberry		6 April 2020	29 November 2021	1 year, 237 days	Labour	Starmer
Nick Thomas-Symonds		29 November 2021	4 September 2023	1 year, 279 days	Labour	Starmer
