= Second Harman shadow cabinet =

UK shadow cabinet in 2015

Second Harman Shadow Cabinet
- Shadow Cabinet of the United Kingdom
- May – September 2015
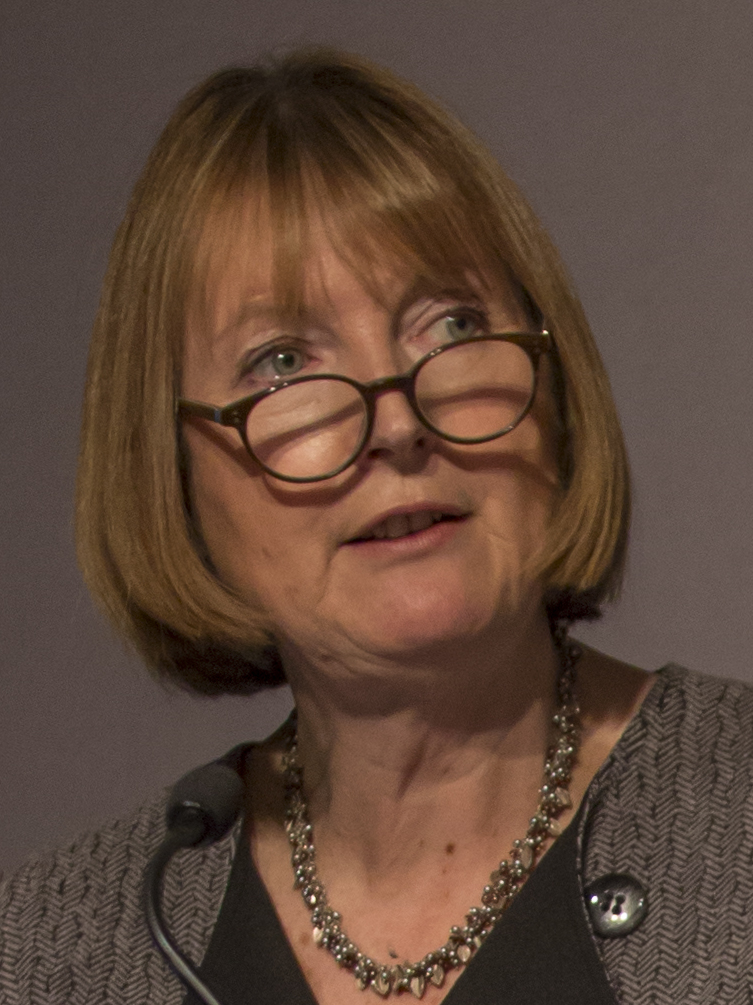
- Date formed: 8 May 2015
- Date dissolved: 12 September 2015

People and organisations
- Monarch: Elizabeth II
- Leader of the Opposition: Harriet Harman
- Shadow First Secretary: Hilary Benn
- Member party: Labour Party
- Status in legislature: Official Opposition

History
- Election: 2015 general election
- Outgoing election: 2015 Labour Party leadership election
- Legislature terms: 56th UK Parliament
- Predecessor: Miliband shadow cabinet
- Successor: Corbyn shadow cabinet

Harriet Harman's second Shadow Cabinet was formed by Harriet Harman in 2015 during her second period as Acting Leader of the Labour Party. She assumed this role after Ed Miliband resigned as party leader (and Leader of the Opposition) and announced she would continue until a new leader was elected on 12 September 2015. Miliband's resignation followed the party's defeat at the 2015 general election.

== Creation ==
On 11 May 2015, Harman announced the make-up of her Shadow Cabinet. Most members of Miliband's last shadow cabinet continued in their roles with the following exceptions:

- Ed Balls was defeated in his former Morley and Outwood constituency, so was replaced as Shadow Chancellor by Chris Leslie.
- Douglas Alexander was defeated in his former Paisley and Renfrewshire South constituency, so was replaced as Shadow Foreign Secretary by Hilary Benn
- Margaret Curran was defeated in her former Glasgow East constituency, so was replaced as Shadow Secretary of State for Scotland by Ian Murray, the party's only remaining MP in Scotland.
- Shabana Mahmood replaced Leslie as Shadow Chief Secretary to the Treasury
- Emma Reynolds replaced Benn as Shadow Secretary of State for Communities and Local Government
- Chris Bryant became Shadow Secretary of State for Culture, Media and Sport, a post previously held by Harman in addition to the deputy leadership.
- Sadiq Khan stepped down from the Shadow Cabinet, and was replaced as Shadow Secretary of State for Justice and Shadow Lord Chancellor by Lord Falconer

Additionally, Benn was given responsibility for the despatch box during deputy PMQs against George Osborne in his role as First Secretary of State.

Harman's first shadow cabinet had been formed during a similar period as pro tempore leader following Gordon Brown's resignation following the 2010 general election.

== Changes ==
On 13 May 2015, Baroness Royall of Blaisdon announced that she would be stepping down as Leader of the Opposition in the House of Lords. Baroness Smith of Basildon was elected unopposed as her successor by Labour peers on 27 May 2015, and thus took her place in the shadow cabinet.

In May 2015, Rachel Reeves went on maternity leave ahead of the birth of her second child. Stephen Timms became Acting Shadow Secretary of State for Work and Pensions.

== Members of the Shadow Cabinet ==
Portfolio	Shadow Minister
Leader of Her Majesty's Most Loyal Opposition; Acting Leader of the Labour Party; Deputy Leader of the Labour Party; Chair of the Labour Party	The Rt Hon Harriet Harman QC MP
Shadow First Secretary of State; Shadow Foreign Secretary	The Rt Hon Hilary Benn MP
Shadow Chancellor of the Exchequer	Chris Leslie MP
Shadow Home Secretary	The Rt Hon Yvette Cooper MP
Shadow Secretary of State for Justice; Shadow Lord Chancellor	The Rt Hon The Lord Falconer of Thoroton PC QC
Shadow Chief Whip in the House of Commons	The Rt Hon Rosie Winterton MP
Shadow Secretary of State for Health	The Rt Hon Andy Burnham MP
Shadow Secretary of State for Business, Innovation and Skills	Chuka Umunna MP
Shadow Secretary of State for Work and Pensions	Rachel Reeves MP (until June 2015)
Shadow Secretary of State for Work and Pensions	The Rt Hon Stephen Timms MP (from June 2015)
Shadow Secretary of State for Education	Tristram Hunt MP
Shadow Secretary of State for Defence	Vernon Coaker MP
Shadow Secretary of State for Communities and Local Government	Emma Reynolds MP
Shadow Secretary of State for Energy and Climate Change	The Rt Hon Caroline Flint MP
Shadow Leader of the House of Commons	Angela Eagle MP
Shadow Secretary of State for Transport	Michael Dugher MP
Shadow Secretary of State for Northern Ireland	Ivan Lewis MP
Shadow Secretary of State for International Development	Mary Creagh MP
Shadow Secretary of State for Scotland	Ian Murray MP
Shadow Secretary of State for Wales	Owen Smith MP
Shadow Secretary of State for Environment, Food and Rural Affairs	Maria Eagle MP
Shadow Minister for the Cabinet Office	Lucy Powell MP
Shadow Minister without Portfolio; Deputy Chair of the Labour Party	Jon Trickett MP
Shadow Minister for Women and Equalities	Gloria De Piero MP
Shadow Chief Secretary to the Treasury	Shabana Mahmood MP
Leader of the Opposition in the House of Lords	The Rt Hon The Baroness Royall of Blaisdon PC (to 27 May)
Leader of the Opposition in the House of Lords	The Rt Hon The Baroness Smith of Basildon PC (from 27 May)
Shadow Chief Whip in the House of Lords	The Rt Hon The Lord Bassam of Brighton PC
Shadow Secretary of State for Culture, Media and Sport	Chris Bryant MP
Also attends Shadow Cabinet meetings
Shadow Minister for Care and Older People	Liz Kendall MP
Shadow Attorney General for England and Wales	The Rt Hon The Lord Bach PC

Sources: Parliament.uk Labour Shadow Cabinet
