= Shadow Minister without Portfolio (UK) =

Member of the Shadow Cabinet of the United Kingdom

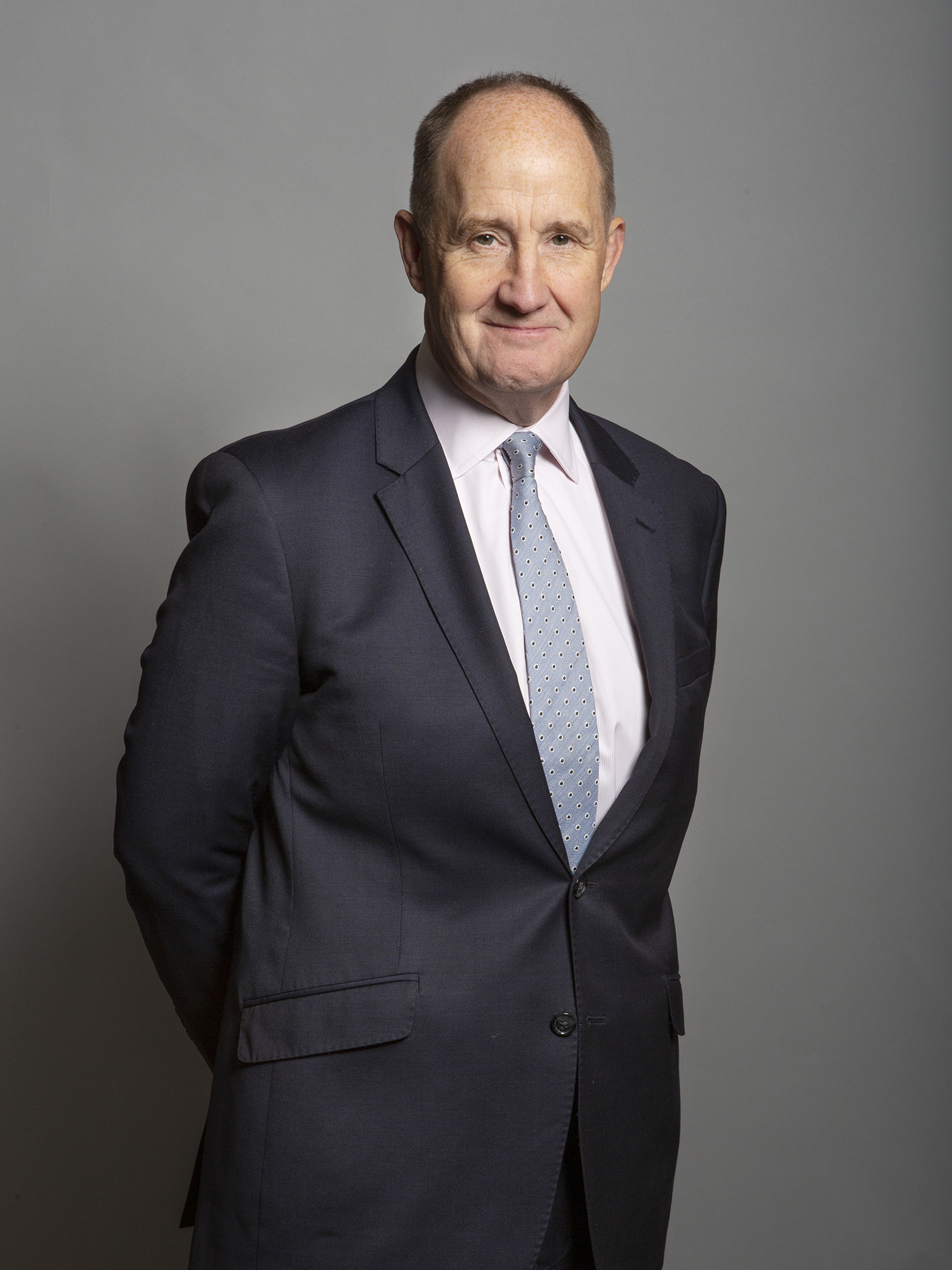
- Incumbent; Kevin Hollinrake since 22 July 2025
- Shadow Cabinet
- Appointer: Leader of the Opposition
- Website: The Conservative Party

The Shadow Minister without Portfolio is a member of the Official Opposition Shadow Cabinet. The postholder shadows the ministers without portfolio currently vacant.

The position is currently held by Kevin Hollinrake since July 2025.

== List of Shadow Ministers without Portfolio ==
Name	Portrait	Term of office		Length of term of office	Party	Shadow Cabinet
Cecil Parkinson		11 June 1997	2 December 1998	1 year, 5 months and 21 days	Conservative	Hague
Michael Ancram		2 December 1998	18 September 2001	2 years, 9 months and 16 days	Conservative	Hague
David Davis		18 September 2001	23 July 2002	10 months and 5 days	Conservative	Duncan Smith
Liam Fox		10 November 2003	10 May 2005	1 year and 6 months	Conservative	Howard
Francis Maude		10 May 2005	3 July 2007	2 years, 1 month and 23 days	Conservative	Howard
Francis Maude		10 May 2005	3 July 2007	2 years, 1 month and 23 days	Conservative	Cameron
Oliver Letwin		8 December 2005	6 May 2010	4 years, 4 months and 28 days	Conservative	Cameron
Caroline Spelman		3 July 2007	19 January 2009	1 year, 6 months and 16 days	Conservative	Cameron
Michael Dugher		7 October 2011	7 October 2013	2 years	Labour	Miliband
The Lord Wood of Anfield		17 October 2011	27 May 2015	3 years, 7 months and 10 days	Labour	Miliband
Jon Trickett		8 October 2013	14 September 2015	1 year, 11 months and 6 days	Labour	Miliband
Jon Trickett		8 October 2013	14 September 2015	1 year, 11 months and 6 days	Labour	Harman II
Jonathan Ashworth		14 September 2015	7 October 2016	1 year and 23 days	Labour	Corbyn
Andrew Gwynne		7 October 2016	14 June 2017	8 months and 7 days	Labour	Corbyn
Ian Lavery		9 February 2017	5 April 2020	3 years, 1 month and 27 days	Labour	Corbyn
Vacant		5 April 2020	4 December 2021	1 year, 7 months and 29 days	Labour	Starmer
Conor McGinn		4 December 2021	22 September 2022	9 months and 18 days	Labour	Starmer
Vacant		23 September 2022	4 September 2023	11 months and 12 days	Labour	Starmer
Nick Thomas-Symonds		4 September 2023	5 July 2024	10 months and 1 day	Labour	Starmer
Kevin Hollinrake		22 July 2025	Incumbent	1 year, 1 month and 16 days*	Conservative	Badenoch

* Incumbent's length of term last updated: 7 September 2026.
