= Shadow Secretary of State for Justice =

UK shadow minister

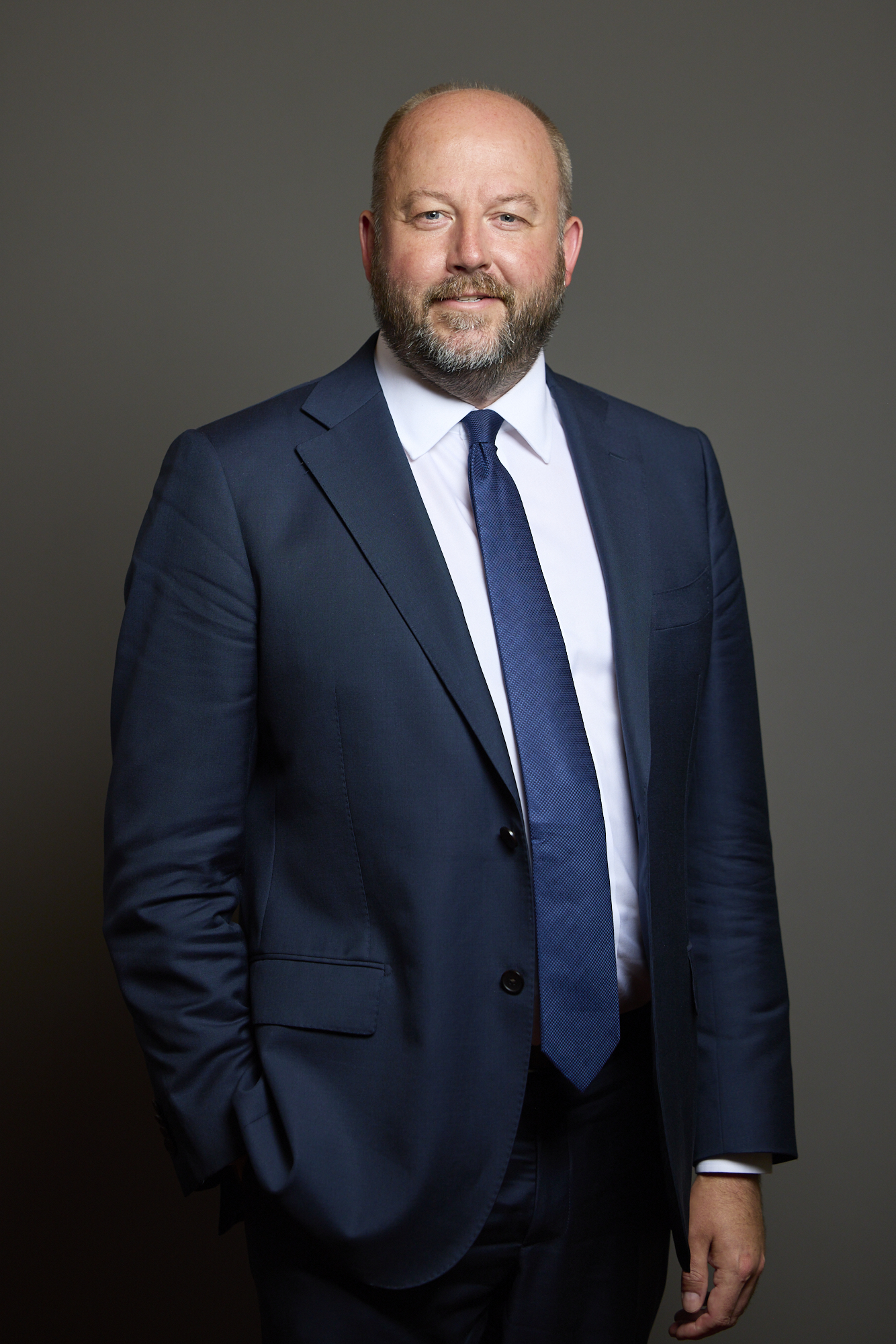
- Incumbent; Nick Timothy since 15 January 2026
- Appointer: Leader of the Opposition
- Inaugural holder: Bill Cash

In British politics, the shadow secretary of state for justice is the member of the Shadow Cabinet who shadows the secretary of state for justice, an office which has existed since 2007. Prior to 2007, the office was known as Shadow Secretary of State for Constitutional Affairs. The latest holder of the post is Nick Timothy.

== Shadow secretaries of state ==
=== Shadow Secretary of State for Constitutional Affairs ===
Name	Entered office	Left office	Party	Shadow Cabinet
Bill Cash	1 July 2003	13 November 2003	Conservative	Duncan Smith
Alan Duncan	13 November 2003	14 June 2004	Conservative	Howard
Oliver Heald	15 June 2004	8 May 2007	Conservative	Howard
Oliver Heald	15 June 2004	8 May 2007	Conservative	Cameron
=== Shadow Secretary of State for Justice ===
Name	Entered office	Left office	Party	Shadow Cabinet
Oliver Heald	9 May 2007	3 July 2007	Conservative	Cameron
Nick Herbert	3 July 2007	19 January 2009	Conservative	Cameron
Dominic Grieve	19 January 2009 (Note: The source by Grieve's name states Grieve's tenure as 7 September 2009 - 6 May 2010)	11 May 2010	Conservative	Cameron
Jack Straw	12 May 2010	8 October 2010	Labour	Harman I
Sadiq Khan	8 October 2010	11 May 2015	Labour	Miliband
The Lord Falconer of Thoroton	11 May 2015	26 June 2016	Labour	Harman II
The Lord Falconer of Thoroton	11 May 2015	26 June 2016	Labour	Corbyn
Richard Burgon	27 June 2016	6 April 2020	Labour	Corbyn
David Lammy	6 April 2020	29 November 2021	Labour	Starmer
Steve Reed	29 November 2021	4 September 2023	Labour	Starmer
Shabana Mahmood	4 September 2023	5 July 2024	Labour	Starmer
Edward Argar	8 July 2024	4 November 2024	Conservative	Sunak
Robert Jenrick	4 November 2024	15 January 2026	Conservative	Badenoch
Nick Timothy	15 January 2026	Incumbent	Conservative	Badenoch
