= Shadow Minister for Women's Health and Mental Health =

UK shadow minister

Shadow Cabinet Minister for Mental Health
- Shadow Cabinet
- Appointer: Leader of the Opposition
- Formation: 14 September 2015
- First holder: Luciana Berger
- Final holder: Abena Oppong-Asare
- Website: Shadow Cabinet

The Shadow Minister for Women's Health and Mental Health is a position in the United Kingdom's Shadow Cabinet that was created on 14 September 2015. It is a ministerial position, but for a brief period it was Shadow Secretary of State for Mental Health in the May 2021 cabinet reshuffle. It was renamed to its current name in September 2023.

== List of Shadow Ministers for Mental Health ==
Shadow Secretary	Term of Office		Political Party	Leader of the Opposition
Luciana Berger MP	14 September 2015	27 June 2016	Labour	Jeremy Corbyn
Barbara Keeley MP (Note: During Keeley's tenure the office was called Shadow Minister for Mental Health and Social Care.)	7 October 2016	6 April 2020	Labour	Jeremy Corbyn
Rosena Allin-Khan MP	6 April 2020	9 May 2021	Labour	Keir Starmer

== List of Shadow Secretaries of State for Mental Health ==
Shadow Secretary	Term of Office		Political Party	Leader of the Opposition
Rosena Allin-Khan MP	9 May 2021	November 2021	Labour	Keir Starmer

== List of Shadow Cabinet Ministers for Mental Health ==
Shadow Secretary	Term of Office		Political Party	Leader of the Opposition
Rosena Allin-Khan MP	29 November 2021	4 September 2023	Labour	Keir Starmer

== List of Shadow Ministers for Women's Health and Mental Health ==
Shadow Secretary	Term of Office		Political Party	Leader of the Opposition
Abena Oppong-Asare MP	5 September 2023	30 May 2024	Labour	Keir Starmer

== See also ==
- Official Opposition frontbench
