= Shadow Secretary of State for Housing =

Position in British shadow cabinet

- Incumbent; Abolished since 29 November 2021
- Shadow Cabinet
- Appointer: Leader of the Opposition
- Formation: 7 October 2016
- First holder: John Healey
- Final holder: Lucy Powell
- Abolished: 29 November 2021
- Website: Shadow Cabinet

The Shadow Secretary of State for Housing was a position in the United Kingdom's Shadow Cabinet that was created on 7 October 2016 by the Leader of the Opposition, Jeremy Corbyn during a cabinet reshuffle. This position succeeds the position of Shadow Minister for Housing and Planning, and shadowed the Minister of State for Housing at the Department for Levelling Up, Housing and Communities in Her Majesty's Government. The office was succeeded by the Shadow Secretary of State for Levelling Up, Housing and Communities.

== List ==
Holder	Term of Office		Political Party	Leader of the Opposition
Shadow Minister for Housing and Planning
John Hayes	1 June 2003	1 April 2005	Conservative	Iain Duncan Smith
John Hayes	1 June 2003	1 April 2005	Conservative	Michael Howard
Michael Gove	10 May 2005	2 July 2007	Conservative	Michael Howard
Michael Gove	10 May 2005	2 July 2007	Conservative	David Cameron
Grant Shapps	20 December 2007	11 May 2010	Conservative	David Cameron
John Healey	12 May 2010	8 October 2010	Labour	Harriet Harman
Jack Dromey	8 October 2010	7 October 2013	Labour	Ed Miliband
Emma Reynolds	7 October 2013	8 May 2015	Labour	Ed Miliband
John Healey	14 September 2015	27 June 2016	Labour	Jeremy Corbyn
Shadow Secretary of State for Housing
John Healey	7 October 2016	6 April 2020	Labour	Jeremy Corbyn
Thangam Debbonaire	6 April 2020	9 May 2021	Labour	Keir Starmer
Lucy Powell	9 May 2021	29 November 2021	Labour	Keir Starmer
Shadow Minister for Housing and Planning
Matthew Pennycook	4 December 2021	5 July 2024	Labour	Keir Starmer
Gareth Bacon	22 July 2025	Incumbent	Conservative	Kemi Badenoch

== See also ==
- Official Opposition frontbench
