= Shadow Secretary of State for Young People and Democracy =

UK shadow minister

- Incumbent; Abolished since 29 November 2021
- Member of: Shadow Cabinet
- Appointer: Leader of the Opposition
- Formation: 14 September 2015
- First holder: Gloria De Piero
- Final holder: Cat Smith
- Abolished: 29 November 2021

The Shadow Secretary of State for Young People and Democracy was a position in the Shadow Cabinet of the United Kingdom.

The role was established as Shadow Minister for Young People and Voter Registration by the Leader of the Opposition, Jeremy Corbyn, on 14 September 2015. Upon Cat Smith's appointment in 2016, the title was changed to Shadow Minister for Voter Engagement and Youth Affairs. Opposition Leader Keir Starmer re-named the position in his May 2021 reshuffle to Shadow Secretary of State for Young People and Democracy. The position was abolished in the November 2021 reshuffle.

== List of officeholders ==
Name	Portrait	Term of Office		Party	Opposition Leader
=== Shadow Minister for Young People and Voter Registration ===
Gloria De Piero		14 September 2015	26 June 2016	Labour	Jeremy Corbyn
=== Shadow Minister for Voter Engagement and Youth Affairs ===
Cat Smith		27 June 2016	9 May 2021	Labour	Jeremy Corbyn; Keir Starmer
=== Shadow Secretary of State for Young People and Democracy ===
Cat Smith		9 May 2021	29 November 2021	Labour	Keir Starmer

== See also ==
- Official Opposition frontbench
