= Shadow Secretary of State for Exiting the European Union =

Former political office in the UK Shadow Cabinet

- Status: Abolished
- Appointer: Leader of the Opposition
- Inaugural holder: Emily Thornberry
- Formation: 20 July 2016
- Final holder: Sir Keir Starmer
- Abolished: 4 April 2020

In British politics, the Shadow Secretary of State for Exiting the European Union, or informally Shadow Brexit Secretary, was a position within the opposition's shadow cabinet that dealt with issues surrounding the UK's withdrawal from the European Union. The position was only ever a part of Jeremy Corbyn's Shadow Cabinet between 2016 and 2020.

Keir Starmer held the position between October 2016 and April 2020, although the position became unusual, as the Department for Exiting the European Union was abolished on 31 January 2020, so there was no Secretary of State for Exiting the European Union to shadow. The shadow Brexit secretary's position was formally abolished on 4 April 2020, following Starmer's election as leader of the Labour Party.

During the period when this position existed, several shadow ministers for Brexit also served in the opposition's shadow cabinet and often deputised for the Shadow Secretary of State.

== List of Shadow Secretaries of State for Exiting the European Union ==
Name	Portrait	Term of office		Political party	Leader
Emily Thornberry		20 July 2016	6 October 2016	Labour	Jeremy Corbyn
Keir Starmer		6 October 2016	4 April 2020	Labour	Jeremy Corbyn

== List of Shadow Ministers for Exiting the European Union ==
Three shadow ministers were appointed by Jeremy Corbyn in October 2016. Matthew Pennycook resigned in September 2019 in order to attempt to stop Brexit. Jenny Chapman was one of the Red Wall MPs to be defeated in Boris Johnson's landslide victory in the 2019 general election, losing her seat of Darlington, County Durham to the Conservative candidate Peter Gibson. Chapman was replaced by Thangam Debbonaire in January 2020. The position was abolished when Keir Starmer was elected Labour Leader in April 2020.

Name	Portrait	Term of office		Political party	Leader
Jenny Chapman		9 October 2016	6 November 2019	Labour	Jeremy Corbyn
Matthew Pennycook		9 October 2016	25 September 2019	Labour	Jeremy Corbyn
Paul Blomfield		9 October 2016	4 April 2020	Labour	Jeremy Corbyn
Thangam Debbonaire		7 January 2020	4 April 2020	Labour	Jeremy Corbyn
