= Chair of the Labour Party (UK) =

British political office

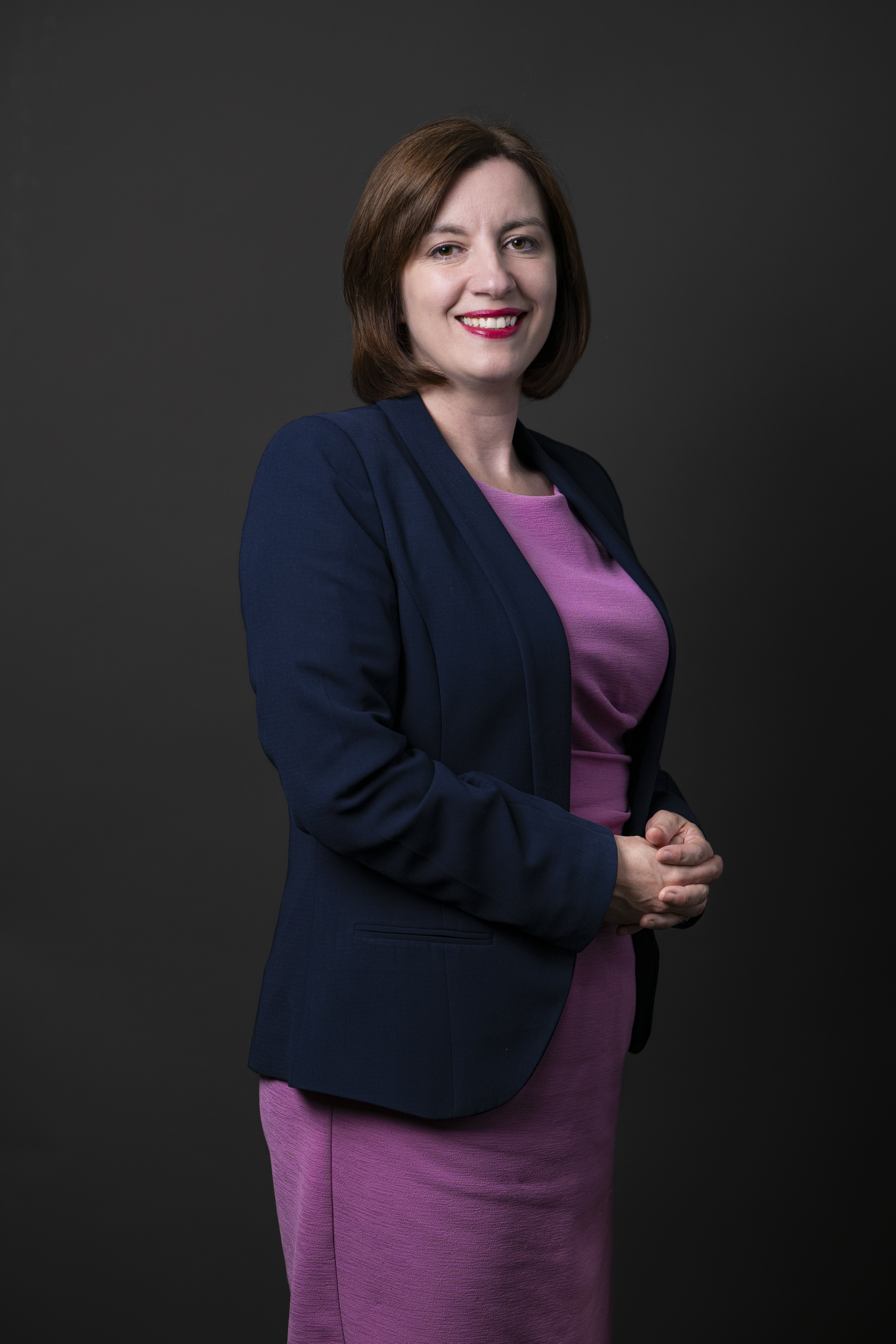
- Incumbent; Bridget Phillipson since 27 July 2026
- Style: Party Chair (informal)
- Appointer: Leader of the Labour Party
- Formation: 9 June 2001
- First holder: Charles Clarke

The Chair of the Labour Party is a position in the Labour Party of the United Kingdom. The Chair is responsible for party administration and for overseeing general election campaigns, and is typically held concurrently with another position.

== History ==
Tony Blair established the office after the 2001 general election. During his tenure as prime minister, it was a Cabinet-level position held alongside the post of minister without portfolio. The position is not to be confused with that of Chair of the Labour National Executive Committee, described as 'chair of the party' in the Labour Party Constitution. The role had a larger portfolio for organising election campaigning under Jeremy Corbyn, with Ian Lavery working alongside the co-national campaign coordinator, Andrew Gwynne.

From June 2007 to June 2017 and again from April 2020 to May 2021, the seat was held concurrently by the party's deputy leader. The position was held by Angela Rayner, who was appointed by Sir Keir Starmer following her election as deputy leader, until 2021 when she was sacked after Labour performed poorly at the local elections and the Hartlepool by-election.

== List of chairs ==
Name	Portrait	Term of office		Length of Term	Concurrent office(s)	Party Leader
Charles Clarke		9 June 2001	24 October 2002	1 year, 137 days	Minister without Portfolio	Tony Blair
John Reid		24 October 2002	4 April 2003	162 days	Minister without Portfolio	Tony Blair
Ian McCartney		4 April 2003	5 May 2006	3 years, 31 days	Minister without Portfolio	Tony Blair
Hazel Blears		5 May 2006	24 June 2007	1 year, 50 days	Minister without Portfolio	Tony Blair
Harriet Harman		24 June 2007	12 September 2015	8 years, 80 days	Deputy Leader of the Labour Party; Leader of the House of Commons (2007–10); Lord Keeper of the Privy Seal (2007–10); Minister for Women and Equality (2007–10)	Gordon Brown
Harriet Harman		24 June 2007	12 September 2015	8 years, 80 days	Leader of the Opposition (2010)	Herself (acting)
Harriet Harman		24 June 2007	12 September 2015	8 years, 80 days	Shadow Deputy Prime Minister of the United Kingdom (2010–15); Shadow Secretary of State for International Development (2010–11); Shadow Secretary of State for Culture, Media and Sport (2011–15)	Ed Miliband
Harriet Harman		24 June 2007	12 September 2015	8 years, 80 days	Leader of the Opposition (2015)	Herself (acting)
Tom Watson		12 September 2015	14 June 2017	1 year, 275 days	Deputy Leader of the Labour Party; Shadow Minister for the Cabinet Office; Shadow Secretary of State for Culture, Media and Sport	Jeremy Corbyn
Ian Lavery		14 June 2017	5 April 2020	2 years, 296 days	Shadow Minister without Portfolio; National Campaign Coordinator	Jeremy Corbyn
Angela Rayner		5 April 2020	8 May 2021	1 year, 33 days	Deputy Leader of the Labour Party; Deputy Leader of the Opposition; Shadow First Secretary of State; National Campaign Coordinator	Sir Keir Starmer
Anneliese Dodds		9 May 2021	6 July 2024	3 years, 58 days	Chair of the Labour Policy Review; Shadow Secretary of State for Women and Equalities	Sir Keir Starmer
Ellie Reeves		6 July 2024	6 September 2025	1 year, 62 days	Minister without Portfolio	Sir Keir Starmer
Anna Turley		6 September 2025	21 July 2026	318 days	Minister without Portfolio	Sir Keir Starmer
Bridget Phillipson		27 July 2026	Incumbent	67 days	Minister for Women and Equalities	Andy Burnham
