= Deputy premiership of David Lammy =

Tenure of English politician, 2025–2026

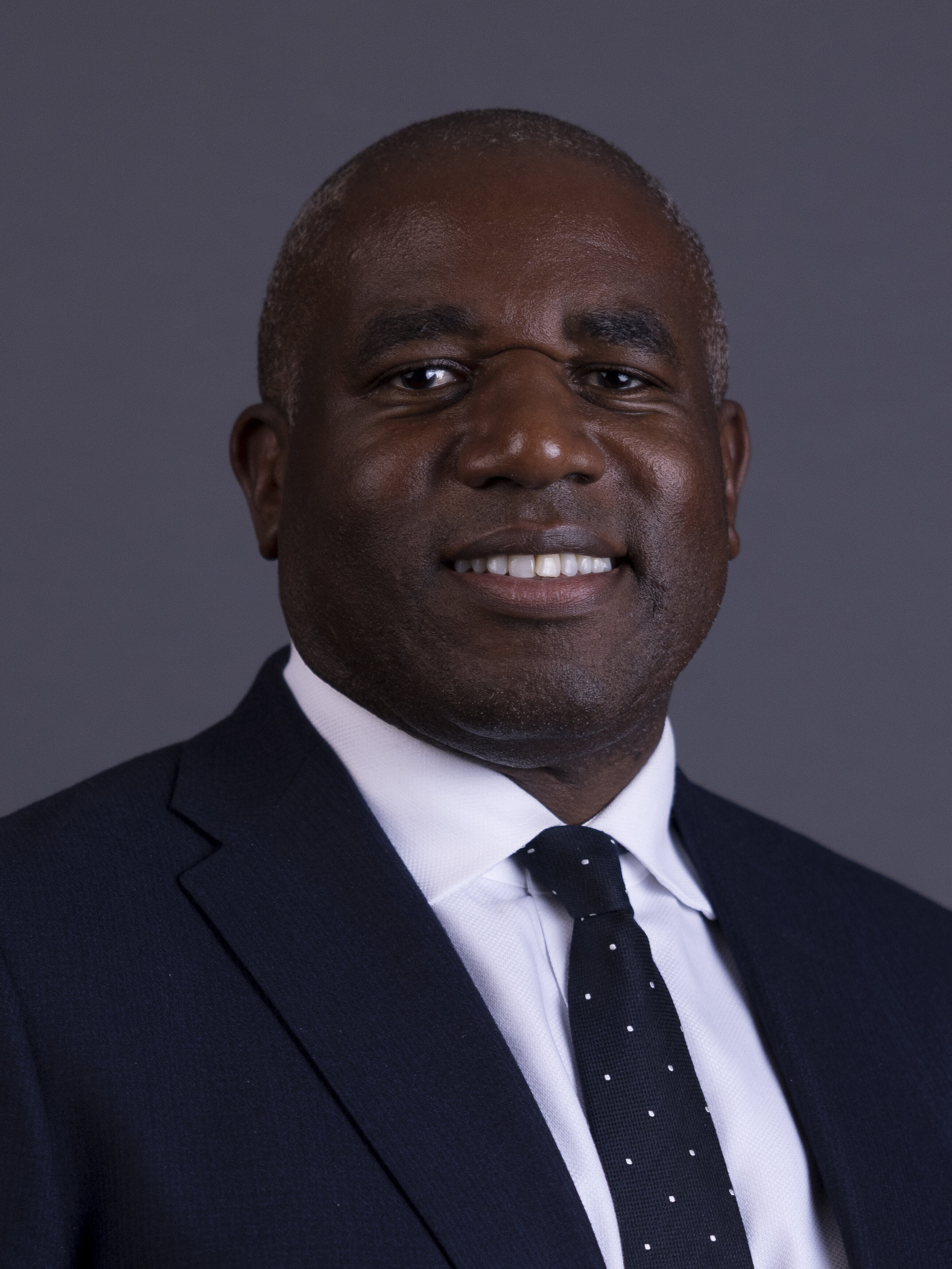
- Official portrait, September 2025
- Deputy premiership of David Lammy; 5 September 2025 – 20 July 2026
- Party: Labour
- Nominated by: Keir Starmer
- Appointed by: Charles III
- Seat: 11 Downing Street

David Lammy became Deputy Prime Minister on 5 September 2025, upon his appointment by Prime Minister Keir Starmer, following Angela Rayner's resignation, and ended on 20 July 2026, upon his removal from office.

British Labour Party MP David Lammy became Deputy Prime Minister on 5 September 2025, upon his appointment by Prime Minister Keir Starmer, succeeding Angela Rayner.

Lammy was sacked from the role on 20 July 2026, when Starmer was succeeded by Andy Burnham. He reportedly turned down another "big job" in the Burnham government and instead chose to return to the backbenches.

== Tenure ==
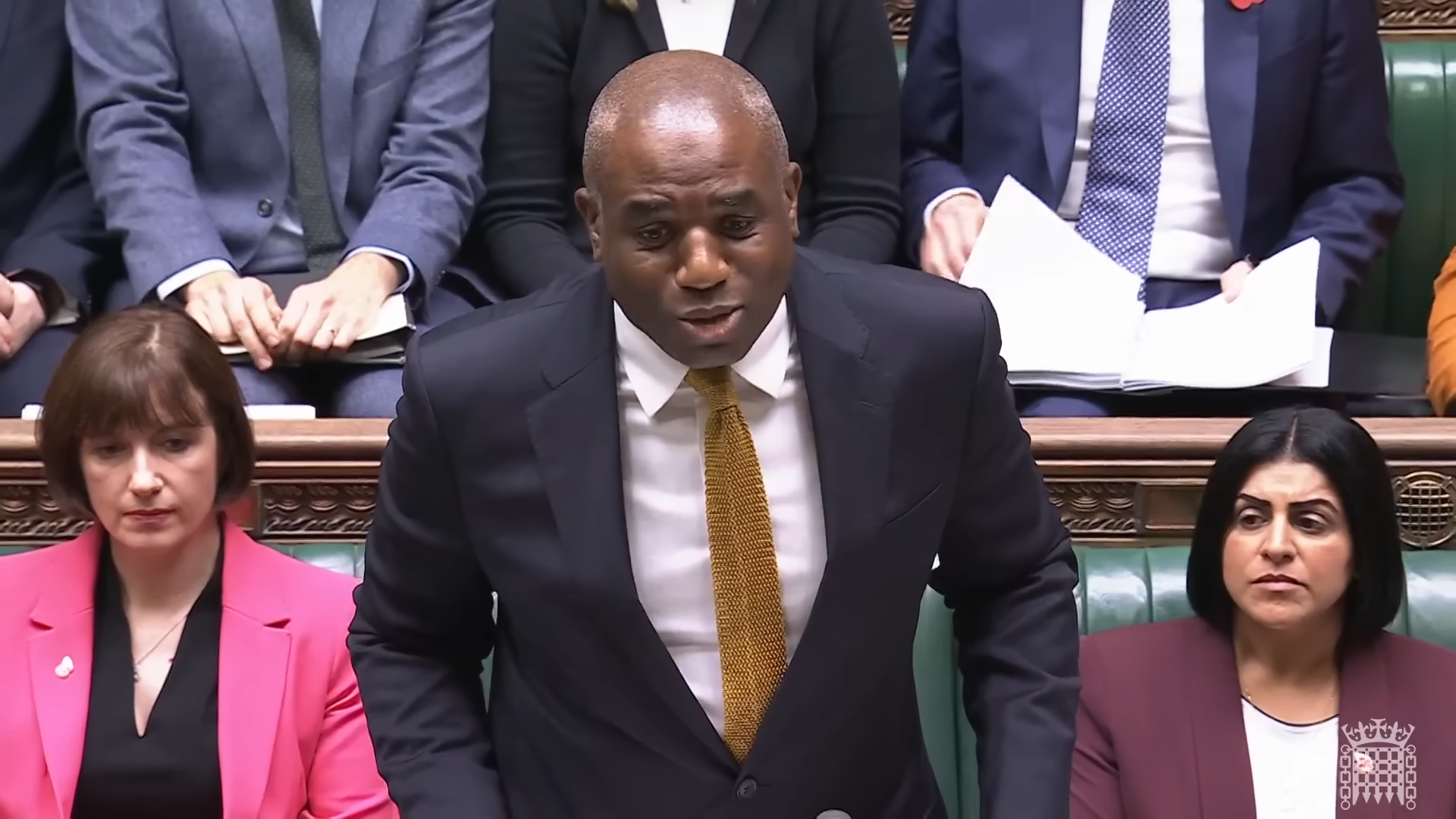
Lammy during deputy PMQs in November 2025

Following the resignation of Angela Rayner, Lammy became Deputy Prime Minister, Secretary of State for Justice and Lord Chancellor in the 2025 cabinet reshuffle on 5 September 2025.

After the resignation of Starmer in June 2026, Lammy endorsed Andy Burnham in the 2026 Labour Party leadership election On 20 July 2026, Burnham dismissed Lammy from the government.
