= Deputy premiership of Angela Rayner =

Tenure of English politician, 2024–2025

- Official portrait, 2024
- Deputy Premiership of Angela Rayner; 5 July 2024 – 5 September 2025
- Party: Labour
- Election: 2024
- Nominated by: Keir Starmer
- Appointed by: Charles III
- Seat: 11 Downing Street

Angela Rayner became Deputy Prime Minister on 5 July 2024, upon her appointment by Prime Minister Keir Starmer, following Labour's victory in the 2024 general election. She succeeded Oliver Dowden of the Conservative Party. She is the second woman to hold the position after Thérèse Coffey.

== Term ==
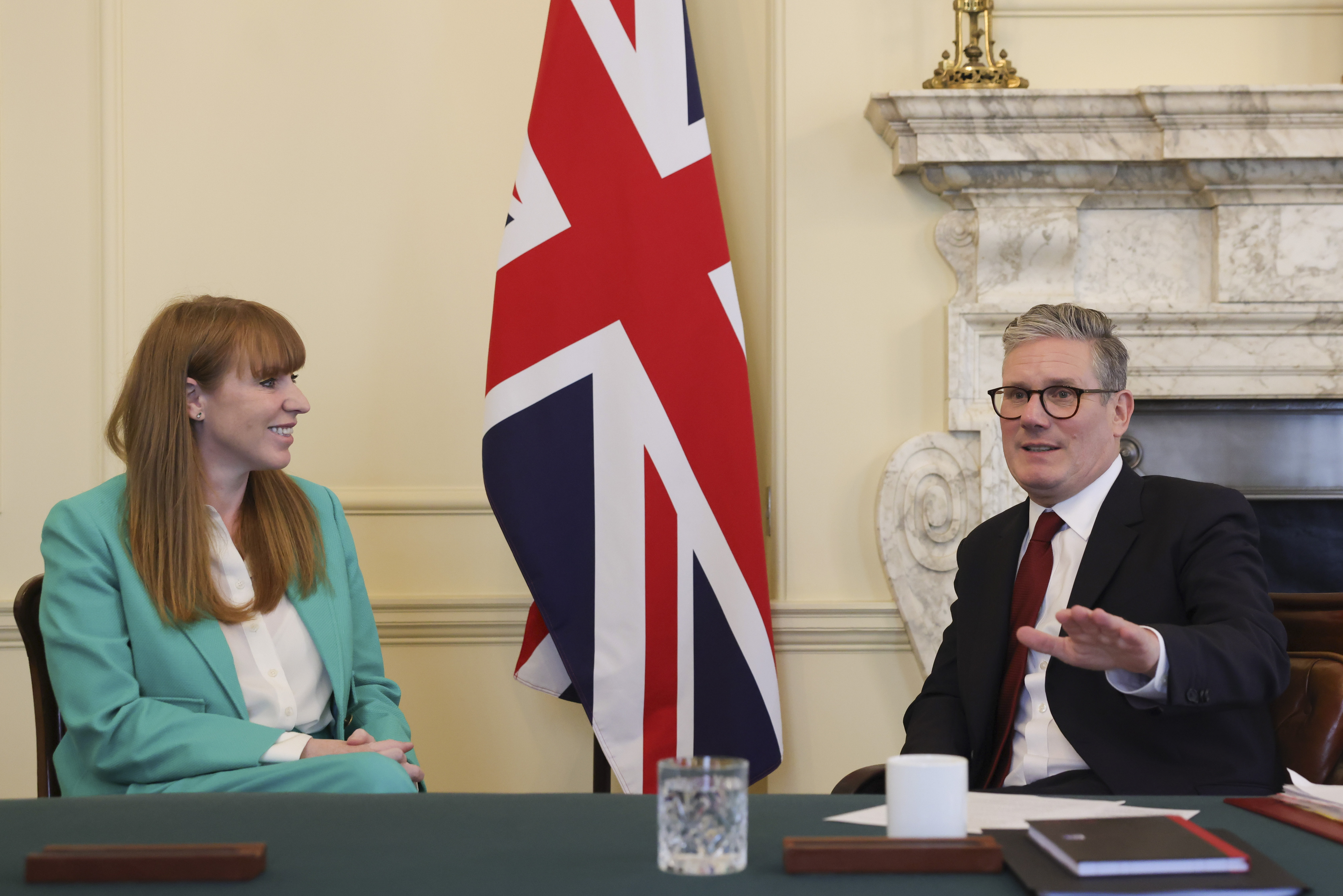
Rayner appointed as Deputy Prime Minister by Keir Starmer, 5 July 2024

Following Labour's landslide victory in the election and the formation of the Starmer ministry, Rayner was appointed to the government as Deputy Prime Minister, and Secretary of State for Housing, Communities and Local Government (known as Secretary of State for Levelling Up, Housing and Communities until 9 July 2024) by Starmer in his government on 5 July 2024.

Rayner condemned the late July and early August riots that started following the Southport stabbing, saying there is "no excuse for thuggery." In her first speech at the Labour Party Conference as Deputy Prime Minister, Rayner opened the conference and said "I want to start off with a thanks to the British people. You entrusted us with the task of change and we will not forget it. You kept faith with us and we will keep faith with you."

As Deputy Prime Minister, Rayner deputised for Starmer at Prime Minister's Questions on four occasions, respectively facing Oliver Dowden, Alex Burghart, Chris Philp and Mel Stride, jokingly saying during the former she would miss her and Dowden's "battle of the gingers".

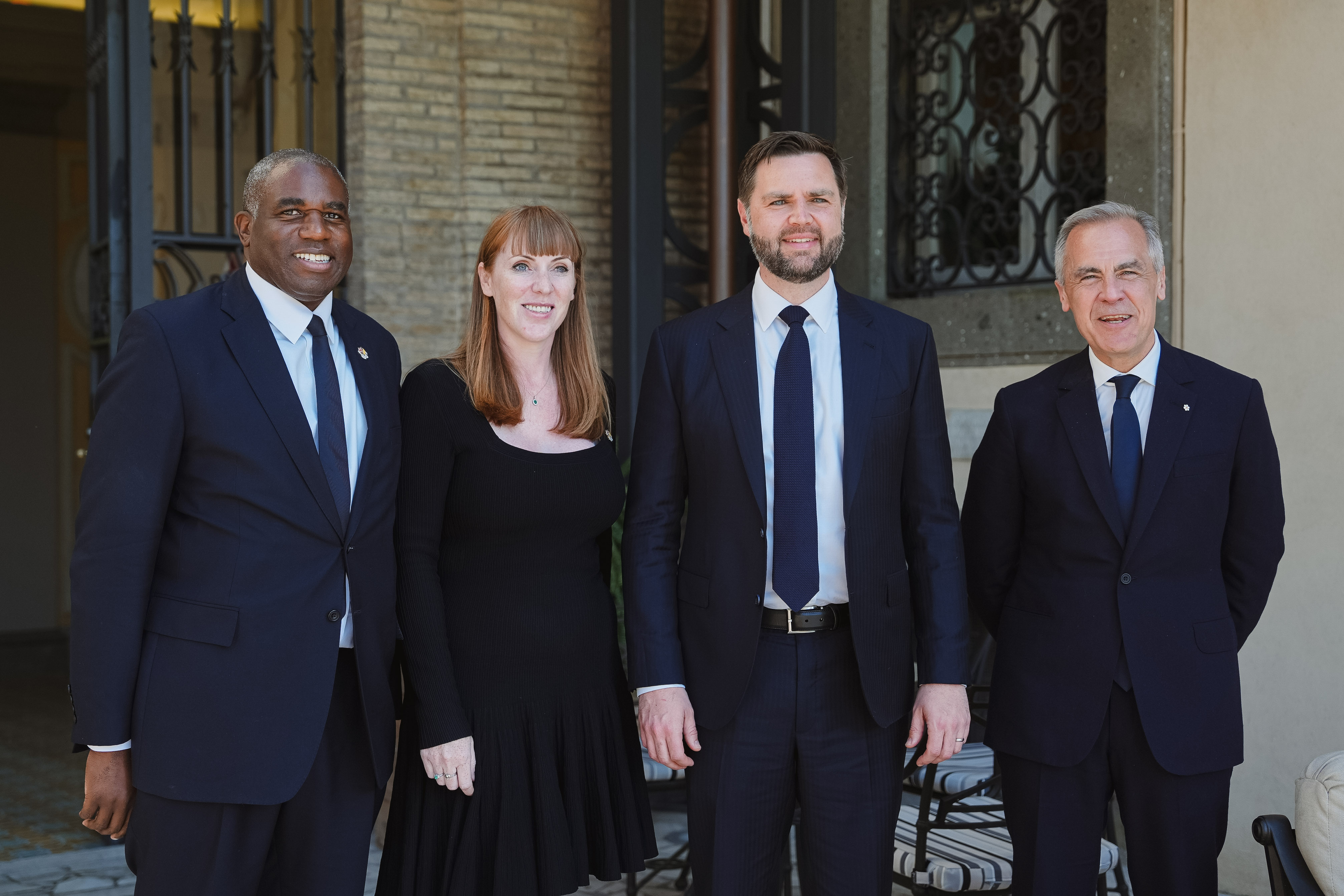
Rayner with Foreign Secretary David Lammy, US Vice President JD Vance, and Canadian Prime Minister Mark Carney at the Vatican in May 2025.

In July 2025, her membership of Unite, one of the largest trade unions was suspended during an escalating dispute with the Starmer government over their role in bin strikes in Birmingham, with media speculation focussing on a possible disaffiliation of the union from the Labour Party. However, Rayner has insisted that she was not a member of Unite at that time.

On 5 September 2025, Rayner resigned from her ministerial position and as the deputy prime minister, and as deputy leader of the party, following the prime minister's ethics adviser, Laurie Magnus, finding that she had breached the ministerial code in relation to her failure to pay the correct amount of tax on one of her properties. This resignation triggered the 2025 British cabinet reshuffle and the 2025 Labour Party deputy leadership election, where she was succeeded by Lucy Powell.
