= Deputy Prime Minister of the United Kingdom =

Senior member of the British government

United Kingdom Deputy Prime Minister of the United Kingdom of Great Britain and Northern Ireland
- Royal arms of His Majesty's Government
- Incumbent; Vacant since 20 July 2026
- Government of the United Kingdom; Cabinet Office
- Style: Deputy Prime Minister (informal); First Secretary of State (de facto); The Right Honourable (within the UK and Commonwealth); His/Her Excellency (diplomatic)
- Type: Minister of the Crown
- Member of: Cabinet; Privy Council; National Security Council; Council of the Nations and Regions; Mayoral Council for England
- Reports to: The Prime Minister
- Residence: None, may use grace and favour residences
- Seat: Westminster
- Formation: 1947
- First holder: Clement Attlee (De facto)
- Website: gov.uk/government/ministers/deputy-prime-minister--3

The deputy prime minister of the United Kingdom is an honorific title given to a minister of the Crown and a member of the British Cabinet, normally to signify a very senior minister, the deputy leader of the governing party, or a key political ally of the prime minister.

It does not entail any specific legal or constitutional responsibilities, though the holder will normally be assigned some duties by the prime minister and in recent times this has typically always included deputising for the prime minister in the House of Commons, domestically and abroad. Appointment to the position is usually paired with appointment to a departmental secretary of state position. The title is not always in use and prime ministers have been known to appoint deputies with the title first secretary of state or informal deputies without any honorific title.

The office is currently vacant, and was most recently held by David Lammy, who served under Keir Starmer from 5 September 2025 until 20 July 2026. Lammy succeeded Starmer's first deputy, Angela Rayner, in a cabinet reshuffle following her resignation due to her involvement in a tax scandal.

== Constitutional position ==
Deputy prime minister is a title and successive monarchs had refused to officially recognise the position. It brings with it no salary and the holder of the title has no right to automatic succession to the premiership.

When Winston Churchill attempted to have Anthony Eden appointed deputy prime minister in 1951, George VI said that the 'office ... does not exist' and that conferring the title may be seen as an attempt to designate the prime minister's successor and thus may restrict the monarch's royal prerogative. However, Vernon Bogdanor has said that that argument holds little weight in the modern context, since the monarch no longer has any real discretion, and that, even in the past, a person acting as deputy prime minister had no real advantage to being appointed prime minister.

== Responsibilities ==
The title is not always in use and the holder's responsibilities will vary depending on the circumstances. As of December 2024, the deputy prime minister's responsibilities included: deputising for the prime minister (in the House of Commons, domestically and internationally), supporting the prime minister, special responsibility for employment rights and cross-governmental coordination of communities policy.

Rodney Brazier has written that there are three reasons why a deputy prime minister has been appointed: to set out the line of succession to the premiership preferred by the prime minister, to promote the efficient discharge of government business and (in the case of Labour governments) to accord recognition to the status of the deputy leader of the Labour party. Jonathan Kirkup and Stephen Thornton suggest that there are multiple motivations behind a prime minister appointing a deputy: leader of a party in a coalition government, as their designated successor, to neuter or mollify a rival, because they are a 'safe pair of hands' and to create a 'balanced ticket'.

Philip Norton says that there are two advantages to a prime minister of having a deputy prime minister (or first secretary of state): functional (to serve the prime minister free of departmental responsibilities, so they can do 'correlation, co-ordination and chairmanship of committees', in the words of Rab Butler) and political (to send a signal as to the status of the holder). Bogdanor, Brazier and Anthony Seldon also suggest that the title may be of use if a prime minister were to die or fall unable to exercise their functions.

== History ==
Before World War II, while a minister was occasionally invited to deputise as prime minister when the prime minister was ill or abroad, no one was styled as such when the prime minister was in the country and physically able to run the government. This changed in 1942 when Clement Attlee was styled as deputy prime minister by Winston Churchill. This designation was seen as an exceptional result of a coalition and the war, and Attlee's 1942 appointment was not formally approved by the King and was a matter of form rather than fact. The designation was because Churchill wanted to demonstrate the importance of the Labour party in the coalition, not for any reasons relating to succession; he actually left written advice that the King should send for Anthony Eden if he were to die, not Attlee. Unusually in comparison to other unofficial deputy prime ministers, Clement Attlee was described as deputy prime minister by Hansard, whereas other unofficial deputies are described using their official position.

After this, fearing a possible curtailment of the monarch's prerogative to choose a prime minister, no one was formally styled deputy prime minister (though there was often a senior minister generally regarded as such) until Michael Heseltine in 1995. As the title of deputy prime minister did not hold any statutory authority, Heseltine was also appointed as First Secretary of State. John Prescott served as deputy prime minister under Tony Blair during the entirety of Blair's premiership, and remains the longest-serving deputy prime minister. Prescott's statutory authority was originally drawn from his concurrent position as Secretary of State for the Environment, Transport and the Regions; however, in 2001 this department was broken up and the Office of the Deputy Prime Minister (ODPM) was also formed within the Cabinet Office. To ensure he continued to hold statutory authority, he was appointed First Secretary of State. In June 2003, the ODPM became a separate department and absorbed the local government and regions portfolios from the defunct Department for Transport, Local Government and the Regions. During the 5 May 2006 reshuffle of Tony Blair's government, Prescott kept his position as deputy prime minister but lost his departmental authority and ODPM was renamed the Department for Communities and Local Government and headed by Ruth Kelly. The position was vacant during Gordon Brown's premiership.

After the Conservatives and the Liberal Democrats formed a coalition government in 2010, Nick Clegg was appointed deputy prime minister under David Cameron, and served in this role until he resigned after the Conservatives won a majority in the 2015 general election. During the coalition William Hague was appointed by Cameron as First Secretary of State, the only time that both these positions have existed concurrently but not been held by the same person. During this time Cameron described Hague rather than Clegg as being his 'de facto political deputy'. The office of deputy prime minister was vacant for the remainder of Cameron's premiership and the entirety of Theresa May's premiership; during this time, the Prime Minister was deputised by the Minister for the Cabinet Office.

In 2020, a year before being formally styled deputy prime minister, Dominic Raab deputised for Boris Johnson while Johnson was in hospital with COVID-19, though was not formally styled deputy prime minister until September 2021. Raab served as deputy prime minister during the remainder of Johnson's premiership. Thérèse Coffey served as deputy prime minister in September and October 2022 under Liz Truss, becoming the shortest serving deputy prime minister in history. After Rishi Sunak became prime minister, he reappointed Raab as deputy prime minister, making him the first non-consecutive holder of the office. Raab resigned in April 2023 after the investigation into his alleged bullying was published, and was succeeded by deputy prime minister Oliver Dowden, who resigned after the 2024 general election, whereupon he was replaced by Angela Rayner in Keir Starmer's Labour government. Following a cabinet reshuffle in September 2025, David Lammy would replace Rayner as the Deputy Prime Minister, becoming the first person of colour to hold the position.

== Office and residence ==
There is no set of offices permanently ready to house the deputy prime minister. Deputy Prime Minister Nick Clegg maintained an office at the Cabinet Office headquarters, 70 Whitehall, which is linked to 10 Downing Street. Clegg's predecessor, Prescott, maintained his main office at 26 Whitehall.

The prime minister may also give them the use of a grace and favour country house. While in office, Nick Clegg resided at his private residence in Putney and he shared Chevening House with First Secretary William Hague as a weekend residence. Clegg's predecessor, John Prescott, used Dorneywood.

== List of deputy prime ministers ==
The following people have held the title of deputy prime minister. (Note: In his list of deputy prime ministers, Brazier includes Geoffrey Howe. However, Norton does not in his, explaining that Buckingham Palace took issue with appointing Howe "Deputy Prime Minister" and proposed "Sir Geoffrey will act as Deputy Prime Minister".)

Deputy prime ministers
Deputy Prime Minister	Term of office		Duration	Other ministerial portfolios held during tenure	Party	Ministry
Clement Attlee; MP for Limehouse (1883–1967)	19 February 1942	23 May 1945	3 years, 94 days	Secretary of State for Dominion Affairs (1942–1943); Lord President of the Council (1943–1945)	Labour	Churchill War
Office vacant	23 May 1945	5 July 1995	50 years, 44 days			
Michael Heseltine; MP for Henley (born 1933)	5 July 1995	2 May 1997	1 year, 302 days	First Secretary of State	Conservative	Major II
John Prescott; MP for Kingston upon Hull East (1938–2024)	2 May 1997	27 June 2007	10 years, 57 days	Secretary of State for the Environment, Transport and the Regions (1997–2001); First Secretary of State (2001–2007); Secretary of State for Local Government and the Regions (2002–2006)	Labour	Blair I
John Prescott; MP for Kingston upon Hull East (1938–2024)	2 May 1997	27 June 2007	10 years, 57 days	Secretary of State for the Environment, Transport and the Regions (1997–2001); First Secretary of State (2001–2007); Secretary of State for Local Government and the Regions (2002–2006)	Labour	Blair II
John Prescott; MP for Kingston upon Hull East (1938–2024)	2 May 1997	27 June 2007	10 years, 57 days	Secretary of State for the Environment, Transport and the Regions (1997–2001); First Secretary of State (2001–2007); Secretary of State for Local Government and the Regions (2002–2006)	Labour	Blair III
Office vacant	27 June 2007	12 May 2010	2 years, 320 days			
Nick Clegg; MP for Sheffield Hallam (born 1967); Tenure	12 May 2010	8 May 2015	4 years, 362 days	Lord President of the Council	Liberal Democrat	Cameron–Clegg
Office vacant	8 May 2015	15 September 2021	6 years, 131 days			
Dominic Raab; MP for Esher and Walton (born 1974); Tenure	15 September 2021	6 September 2022	357 days	Lord Chancellor; Secretary of State for Justice	Conservative	Johnson II
Thérèse Coffey; MP for Suffolk Coastal (born 1971); Tenure	6 September 2022	25 October 2022	50 days	Secretary of State for Health and Social Care	Conservative	Truss
Dominic Raab; MP for Esher and Walton (born 1974); Tenure	25 October 2022	21 April 2023	179 days	Lord Chancellor; Secretary of State for Justice	Conservative	Sunak
Oliver Dowden; MP for Hertsmere (born 1978); Tenure	21 April 2023	5 July 2024	1 year, 76 days	Chancellor of the Duchy of Lancaster; Secretary of State in the Cabinet Office	Conservative	Sunak
Angela Rayner; MP for Ashton-under-Lyne (born 1980); Tenure	5 July 2024	5 September 2025	1 year, 63 days	Secretary of State for Housing, Communities and Local Government	Labour	Starmer
David Lammy; MP for Tottenham (born 1972); Tenure	5 September 2025	20 July 2026	319 days	Lord Chancellor; Secretary of State for Justice	Labour	Starmer
Office vacant	20 July 2026	present	120 days			

== Unofficial deputies ==
The prime minister's second-in-command has variably served as deputy prime minister, first secretary and de facto deputy and at other times prime ministers have chosen not to select a permanent deputy at all, preferring ad hoc arrangements. It has also been suggested that the office of Lord President of the Council (which comes with leading precedence) has been intermittently used for deputies in the past. Minister for the Cabinet Office has also been used in the past to describe deputies, notably during the May government.

=== Lists ===
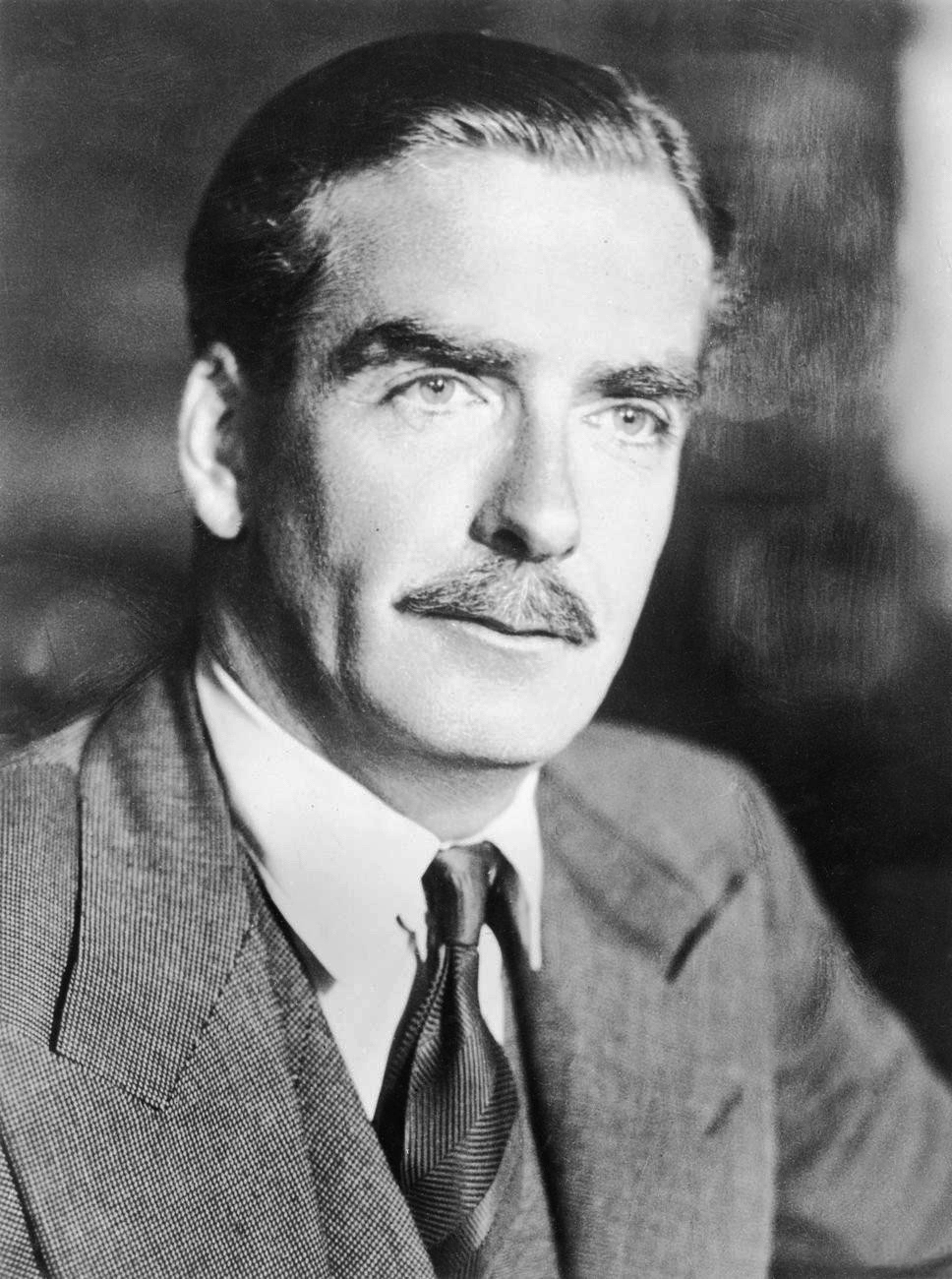
Anthony Eden is often described as Winston Churchill's deputy, though his appointment as deputy prime minister in 1951 was actually rejected by the King.

Picking out definitive deputies to the prime minister has been described as a highly problematic task.

Bogdanor, in his 1995 publication The Monarchy and the Constitution, said that the following people had acted as deputy prime ministers (by this he meant they had chaired the Cabinet in the absence of the prime minister and chaired a number of key Cabinet Committees):

- Clement Attlee
- Herbert Morrison
- Anthony Eden
- Rab Butler
- George Brown
- Michael Stewart
- Reginald Maudling
- William Whitelaw
- Geoffrey Howe

In an academic article first published in 2015, Jonathan Kirkup and Stephen Thornton used five criteria to identify deputies: gazetted or styled in Hansard as deputy prime minister; 'officially' designated deputy prime minister by the prime minister; widely recognised by their colleagues as deputy prime minister; second in the ministerial ranking; and chaired the Cabinet or took Prime Minister's Questions in the prime minister's absence. They said that the following people have the best claim to the position of deputy to the prime minister:

- Clement Attlee
- Herbert Morrison
- Anthony Eden
- Rab Butler
- George Brown
- Michael Stewart
- Willie Whitelaw
- Geoffrey Howe
- Michael Heseltine
- John Prescott
- Nick Clegg

They also said that the following three people would have a reasonable claim:

- Andrew Bonar Law
- Edward Short
- Michael Foot

Brazier has listed the following ministers as unambiguously deputy to or de facto deputies of the prime minister:

Clement Attlee	1940–1945
Anthony Eden	1945; 1951–1955
Herbert Morrison	1945-1951
Rab Butler	1955–1963
George Brown	1964–1970
Reginald Maudling	1970–1972
Willie Whitelaw	1979–1988
Geoffrey Howe	1989–1990
Michael Heseltine	1995–1997
John Prescott	1997–2007
Peter Mandelson	2009-2010
Nick Clegg	2010–2015
George Osborne	2015–2016
Damian Green	2017
David Lidington	2018–2019
Dominic Raab	2019–2022

Lord Norton of Louth has listed the following people as serving as deputy prime minister, but not being formally styled as such:

Herbert Morrison	1945–1951
Anthony Eden	1951–1955
Rab Butler	1962–1963
Willie Whitelaw	1979–1988
Geoffrey Howe	1989–1990
David Lidington	2018–2019

== Succession ==
Nobody has the right of automatic succession to the prime ministership. However, it is generally considered that in the event of the death of the prime minister, it would be appropriate to appoint an interim prime minister, though there is some debate as to how to decide who this should be. In 2021, Cabinet Secretary Simon Case suggested:

[I]t would likely have to be a decision for Cabinet to nominate somebody who could step into the role of Prime Minister in the belief that they could fulfil that requirement and command a majority in the House. The sovereign would need to be given a rapid and clear recommendation by the Government on who to call on. By our estimation, and given the pressures of the job, we do not think you would want to leave it for more than 48 hours before identifying such a person.

When the prime minister is travelling, it is standard practice for a senior duty minister to be appointed who can attend to urgent business and meetings if required, though the prime minister remains in charge and updated throughout. And, on 6 April 2020, when Prime Minister Boris Johnson was admitted into ICU, he asked First Secretary of State Dominic Raab "to deputise for him where necessary". Raab was often dubbed the acting or stand in prime minister during this time, but Raab never formally held this role, and Johnson legally remained the Prime Minister. Despite this, there were some calls for the role to be formalised during this time.

== See also ==
- First Secretary of State
- Deputy Leader of the Labour Party (UK)
