= Glen Owen =

British journalist

Glen Owen is a journalist who was appointed in 2018 as the political editor of The Mail on Sunday, a British newspaper. He was educated at Grey College, Durham University and St Catharine's College, Cambridge.

On 24 April 2022 Owen authored a Mail on Sunday story reporting that anonymous members of the Conservative Party had accused Labour deputy leader Angela Rayner of "crossing and uncrossing her legs" to distract Prime Minister Boris Johnson and comparing her to Sharon Stone film Basic Instinct (1992). Rayner branded the story "gutter journalism", and Johnson commented that he deplored "the misogyny directed at her anonymously today". Following publication, Caroline Nokes suggested that the Women and Equalities Committee could ask Owen to testify. She also contacted the Commons speaker to ask if Owen should be stripped of his Parliamentary Lobby pass. UK press regulator the Independent Press Standards Organisation reported that it had received over 6000 complaints about the article regarding possible breaches of its code of practice but all complaints were rejected. The newspaper's editor, David Dillon, rejected a request from the Speaker of the House Lindsay Hoyle to meet him.
