= Deputy premiership of Oliver Dowden =

Tenure of English politician, 2023-2024

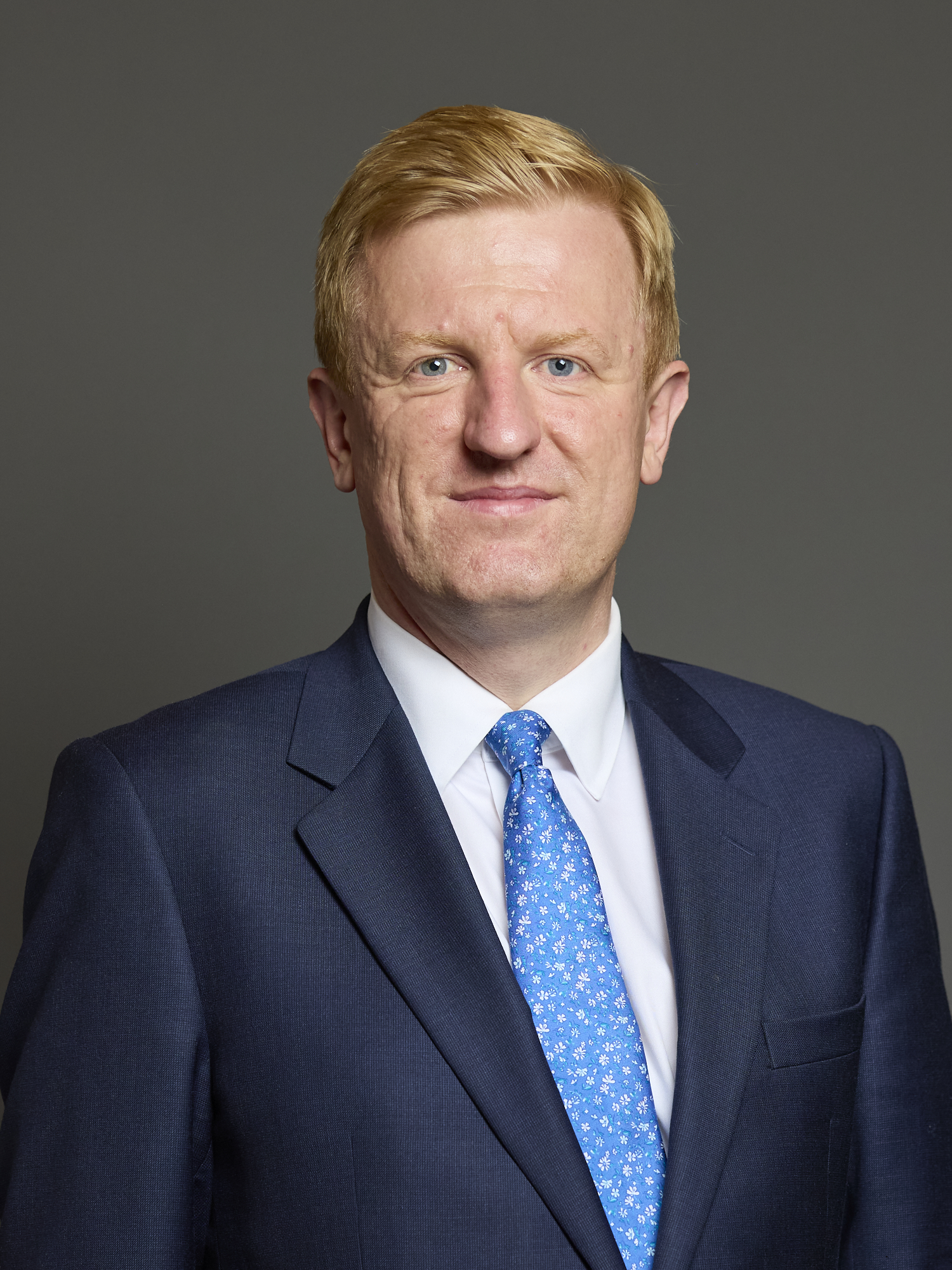
- Official portrait, 2024
- Deputy Premiership of Oliver Dowden; 21 April 2023 – 5 July 2024
- Party: Conservative
- Nominated by: Rishi Sunak
- Appointed by: Charles III
- Seat: 11 Downing Street

Oliver Dowden became Deputy Prime Minister on 21 April 2023, upon his appointment by Prime Minister Rishi Sunak, following Raab's resignation, and ended on 5 July 2024, upon the party’s defeat at the 2024 general election.

== Term ==
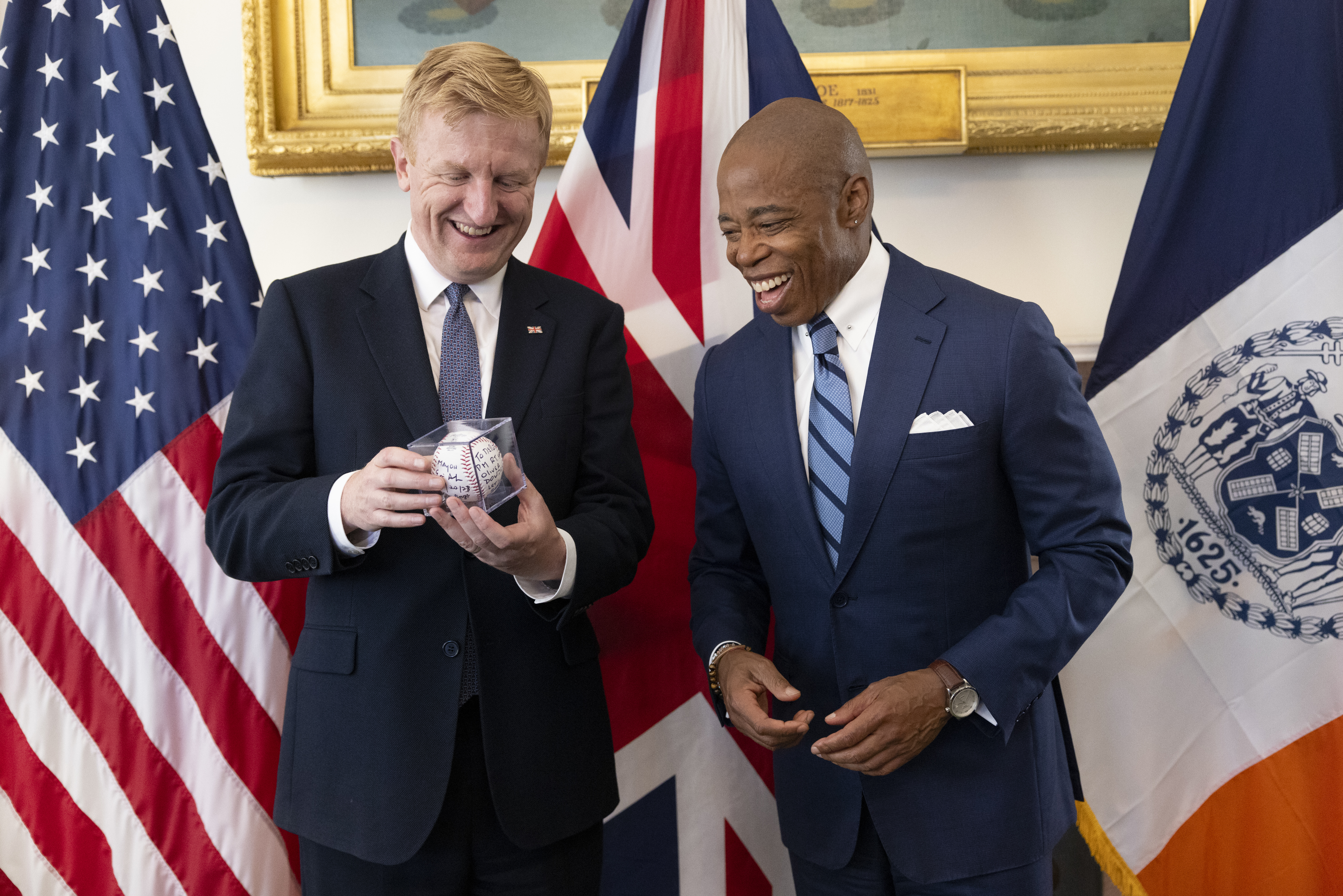
Dowden with New York City Mayor Eric Adams in October 2023

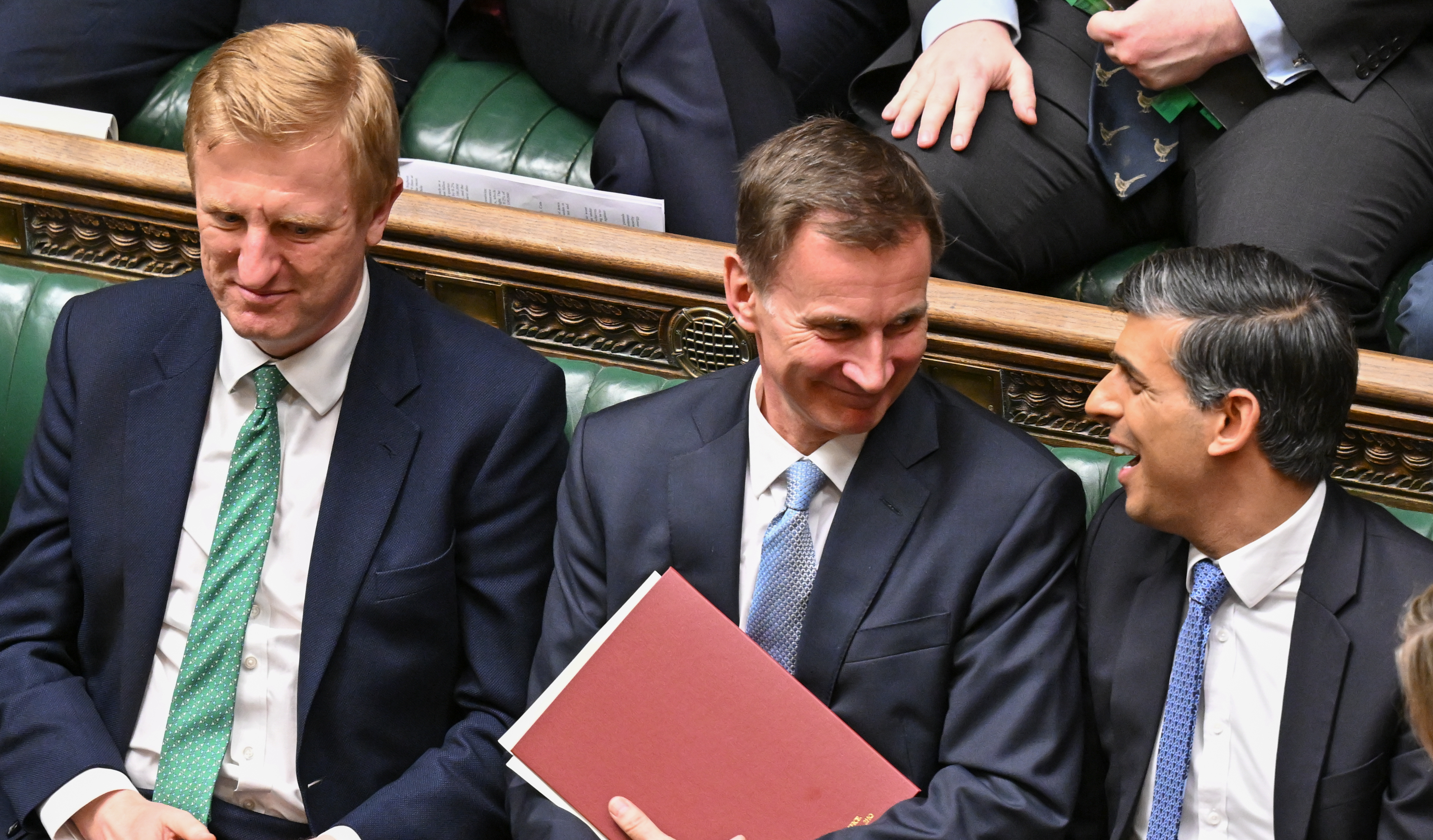
Dowden (left) as Deputy Prime Minister, with Jeremy Hunt and Rishi Sunak, in 2024

On 21 April 2023, following Dominic Raab's resignation after a report over claims he bullied staff was given to Sunak, Dowden was appointed as the deputy prime minister.

As Deputy Prime Minister, Dowden deputised for Sunak at Prime Minister's Questions five times; four in 2023 – on 17 May, 7 June, 5 July and 12 July – and on 24 April 2024. He also took charge of the 'day to day' business of government whilst Sunak was on holiday in August 2023, and in September 2023 he addressed the annual gathering of the United Nations General Assembly in Sunak's place, with a speech on artificial intelligence.

The New Statesman named Dowden as the tenth most powerful right-wing figure of 2023, stating "there are few with as much influence on how the government operates".

On 25 March 2024 Dowden delivered a government statement on Chinese interference with domestic political processes. He indicated that the foreign interference offence might be brought to bear, especially in terms of APT31 which had been unsuccessful in its attempt to access secret data.
