= Proposed National Education Service =

Proposal in the United Kingdom

The Proposed National Education Service is a 'unified National Education Service (NES) for England to move towards cradle-to-grave learning that is free at the point of use', proposed by the Labour Party in their manifesto for the 2017 general election. The National Education Service was again included in the Labour Party's manifesto for the 2019 General Election.

== Scope ==
... Labour will create a unified National Education Service (NES) for England to move towards cradle-to-grave learning that is free at the point of use. The NES will be built on the principle that ‘Every Child – and Adult Matters’ and will incorporate all forms of education, from early years through to adult education.

The National Education Service is being to ensure opportunities for life-long learning are available to meet both of the core aims of education: personal education and education for employment.

While early Labour Party statements have suggested that the NES would be "free at the point of use", as the details of the service are developed it is likely to that this statement will be taken to apply to what is identified as entitlement for all up to the age of 18 and that a variety of funding strategies will apply post-18. For example, where there are national priorities for retraining, such training could be free at the point of use by those who are retraining. Where post-18 education is for personal fulfilment rather than national skill shortages, a charge would be expected.

The labour party believes this is an example of how scholarships for post-18 education could be used to signal to prospective students what the national skill shortages are. In England, it is believed by labour, that the current approach to the school system means that government has limited options to ensure the curriculum offered to students post 16 meets national priorities.

In both university and school systems, it is believed by labour, an unforeseen consequence has been that the school and university leaders have managed to negotiate salaries which are considered high, which has led to publishing of salary league tables.

The education sector is divided into these phases.

- in early years child care
- schools (primary, secondary, special)
- higher education
- workplace and vocational training
- adult education

All phases are subject to quality assurance and monitoring through independent inspection through OFSTED or QAA, as they are currently for all phases with the exception of workplace training.

== History ==
=== 2019 Commission ===
A team of 16 experts were appointed by Labour leader Jeremy Corbyn to the Lifelong Learning Commission in February 2019. This commission was intended to focus on expanding and transforming lifelong learning as a key component of the NES. The commission was led by Labour MP and Shadow Minister for Higher Education, Further Education and Skills, Gordon Marsden and Shadow Secretary of State for Education, Angela Rayner. The commission was launched in a speech given by Jeremy Corbyn to the Make UK/EEF (manufacturers' association) annual conference in London's QEII centre on 19 February 2019.

Membership of the commission comprised:

Co-Chair – Estelle Morris, former education secretary

Co-chair – Dave Ward, general secretary, Communication Workers Union

Alison Fuller – Professor – Vocational Education and Work, UCL

Séamus Nevin – Chief Economist, Make UK

Ewart Keep – Director of Centre for Skills, Knowledge and Organisational Performance, Oxford University

Mary Kellett – Vice-Chancellor, Open University

Graeme Atherton – Director of the National Education Opportunities Network

Joyce Black – Assistant Director, R&D, Learning and Work Institute

Amatey Doku – Vice President Higher Education, National Union of Students

Kirstie Donnelly – Managing Director, City and Guilds

Vicky Duckworth – Professor in Education, Edge Hill University

David Latchman – Master of Birkbeck

Dave Phoenix – Vice-Chancellor, London South Bank University

Carole Stott – Former Chair of the Board and Trust, Association of Colleges

Matt Waddup – National Head Of Policy & Campaigns – University and College Union

Tom Wilson – Chair of UFI, Former Head of Unionlearn.

The Commission's findings and proposals were announced during the launch of Labour's education manifesto for the 2019 UK General Election, in Blackpool on 12 November 2019.

=== 10 Principles ===
In September 2017, Angela Rayner announced 10 principles that would be consulted upon.

The 10 principles are:

1. Education has intrinsic value in giving all people access to the common body of knowledge we share, and practical value in allowing all to participate fully in our society. These principles shall guide the National Education Service.

2. The National Education Service shall provide education that is free at the point of use, available universally and throughout life.

3. The National Education Service provides education for the public good and all providers within the National Education Service shall be bound by the principles of this charter.

4. High-quality education is essential to a strong and inclusive society and economy, so the National Education Service shall work alongside the health, sustainability, and industrial policies set by a democratically elected government.

5. Every child, and adult, matters, so the National Education Service will be committed to tackling all barriers to learning and providing high-quality education for all.

6. All areas of skill and learning deserve respect. The National Education Service will provide all forms of education, integrating academic, technical and other forms of learning within and outside of educational institutions, and treating all with equal respect.

7. Educational excellence is best-achieved through collaboration. The National Education Service will be structured to encourage and enhance cooperation across boundaries and sectors.

8. The National Education Service shall be accountable to the public, communities, and parents and children that it serves. Schools, colleges, and other public institutions within the National Education Service should be rooted in their communities, with parents and communities empowered, via appropriate democratic means, to influence change where it is needed and ensure that the education system meets their needs. The appropriate democratic authority will set, monitor and allocate resources, ensuring that they meet the rights, roles, and responsibilities of individuals and institutions.

9. The National Education Service aspires to the highest standards of excellence and professionalism. Educators and all other staff will be valued as highly-skilled professionals, and appropriate accountability will be balanced against giving genuine freedom of judgement and innovation. The National Education Service shall draw on evidence and international best practice, and provide appropriate professional development and training.

10. The National Education Service must have the utmost regard for the wellbeing of learners and educators. Its policies and practices - particularly regarding workload, assessment and inspection - will support the emotional, social and physical wellbeing of students and staff
