= Deputy premiership of Dominic Raab =

Tenure of English politician, 2021-2022, 2022-2023

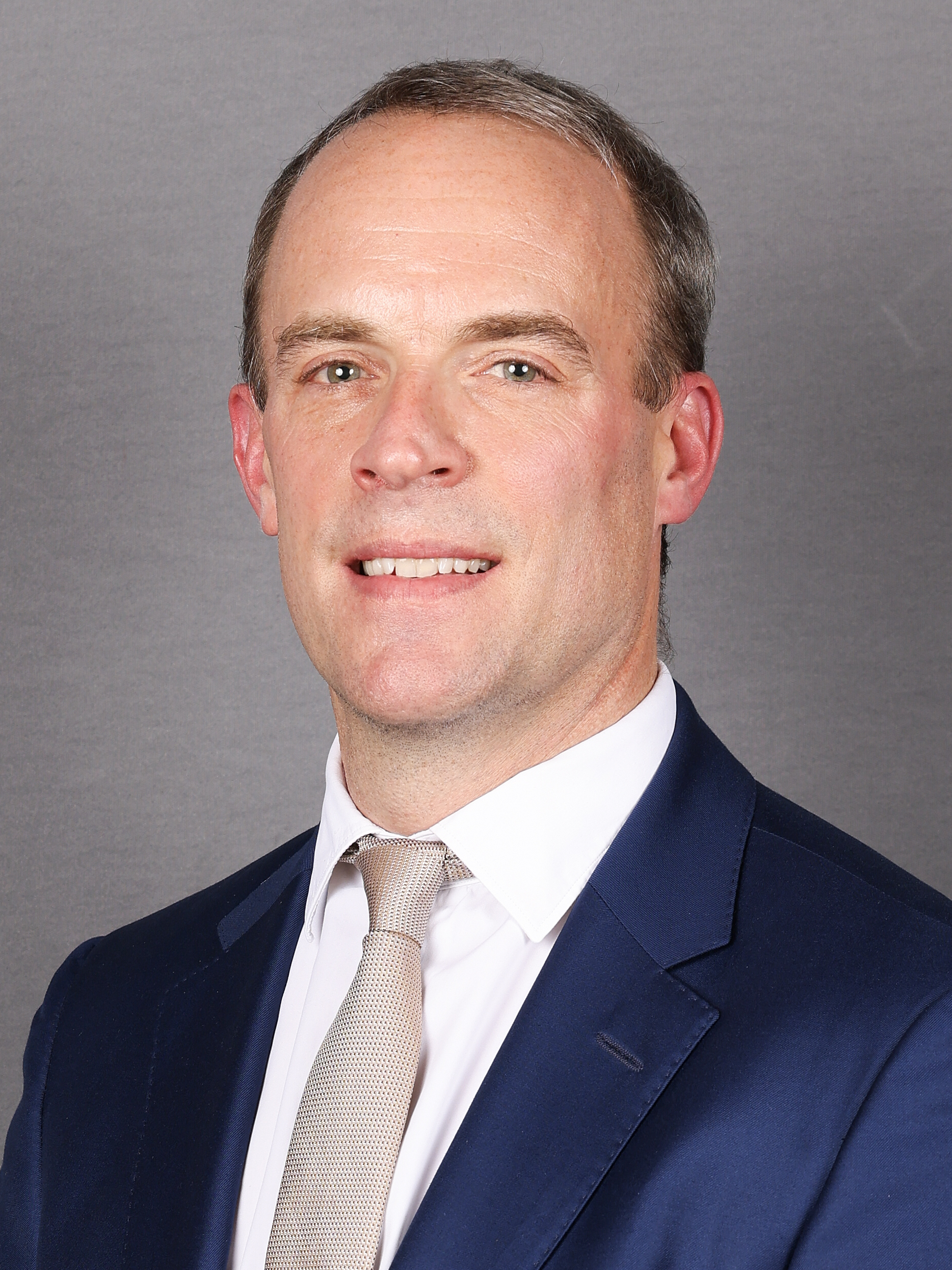
- Official portrait, 2022
- Deputy Premiership of Dominic Raab; First term 15 September 2021 – 6 September 2022; Second term 25 October 2022 – 21 April 2023
- Party: Conservative
- Seat: 11 Downing Street
- First term 15 September 2021 – 6 September 2022
- Nominated by: Boris Johnson
- Appointed by: Elizabeth II
- Second term 25 October 2022 – 21 April 2023
- Nominated by: Rishi Sunak
- Appointed by: Charles III

Dominic Raab became Deputy Prime Minister on 15 September 2021, following his appointment by Prime Minister Boris Johnson during the 2021 cabinet reshuffle. He was reappointed to the position on 25 October 2022 by Prime Minister Rishi Sunak, following the resignation of Liz Truss and the formation of Sunak's government. On both occasions, Raab also served as Lord Chancellor and Secretary of State for Justice.

== First term (2021–2022) ==
In a cabinet reshuffle on 15 September 2021, Raab was appointed Secretary of State for Justice and Lord Chancellor. He was also given the title of Deputy Prime Minister, a post unused since the Cameron–Clegg coalition.

Raab declined to run in the July–September 2022 Conservative Party leadership election. He endorsed Sunak's leadership bid.

In August 2022, Raab moved to block the release of the parents of now seven-year-old Tony Hudgell, who had been abused by them and had to have his legs amputated.

The Guardian reported in December 2022 that Raab prevented the victims' commissioner for England and Wales being reappointed and is not expected to replace her for months. According to victims' groups, critical legislation was going through parliament without an independent reviewer. Unnamed sources stated Raab intervened to stop Vera Baird staying as victims' commissioner.

== Second term (2022–2023) ==
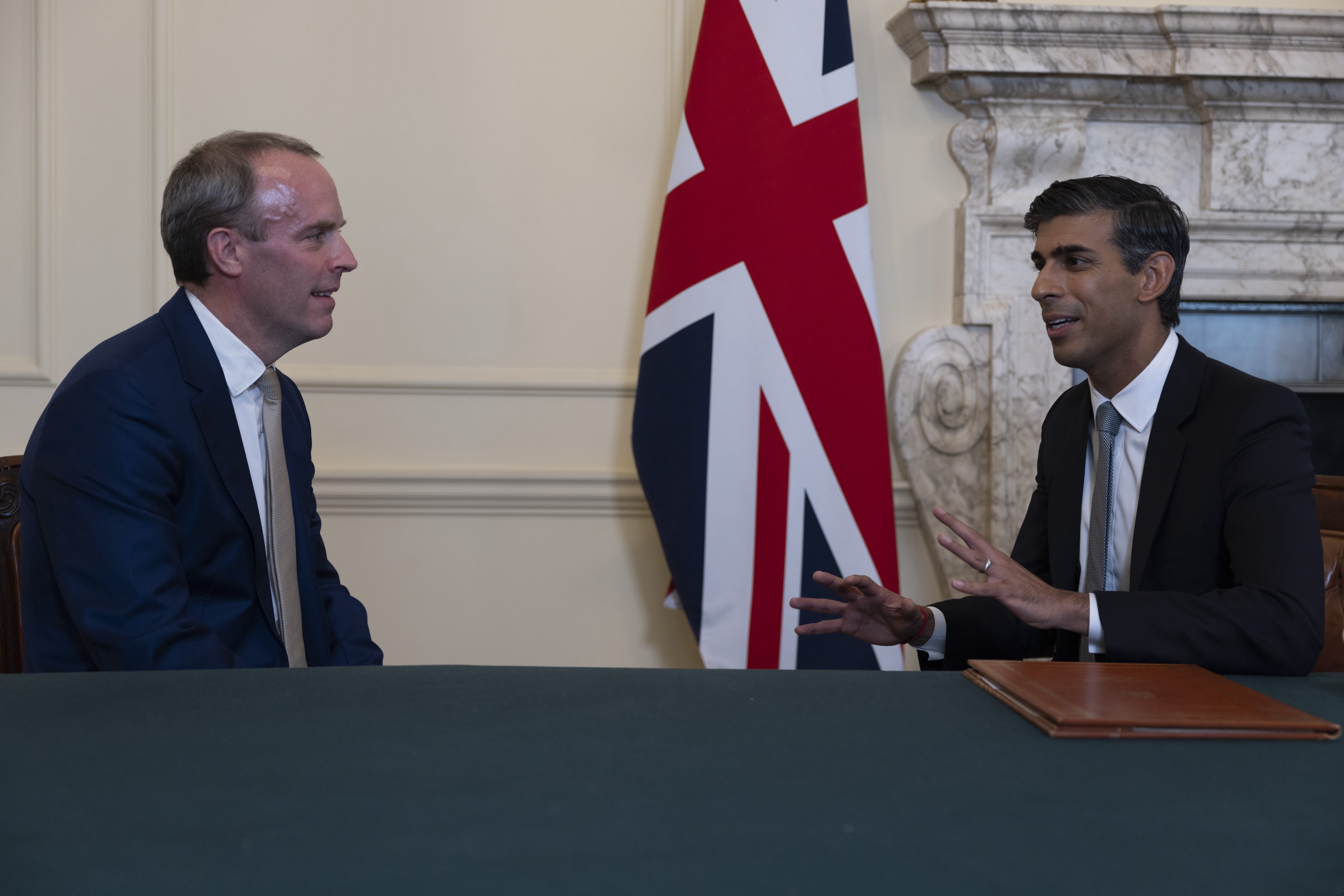
Raab meeting with Prime Minister Rishi Sunak after his appointment as Deputy Prime Minister, Lord Chancellor and Justice Secretary on 25 October 2022.

Raab was reappointed by Sunak as Deputy Prime Minister, Justice Secretary and Lord Chancellor on 25 October 2022. In November 2022, Raab said that terrorist offenders would face longer sentences if they committed crime, such as vandalising cells, while in prison.

Raab resigned as both Deputy Prime Minister and Justice Secretary on 21 April 2023, after an independent investigation found that his behaviour towards civil servants at the Ministry of Justice and at the Foreign, Commonwealth and Development Office had amounted to bullying in two cases. The report of the investigation was published on the same day.
