= Angela Rayner tax scandal =

2025 United Kingdom political controversy

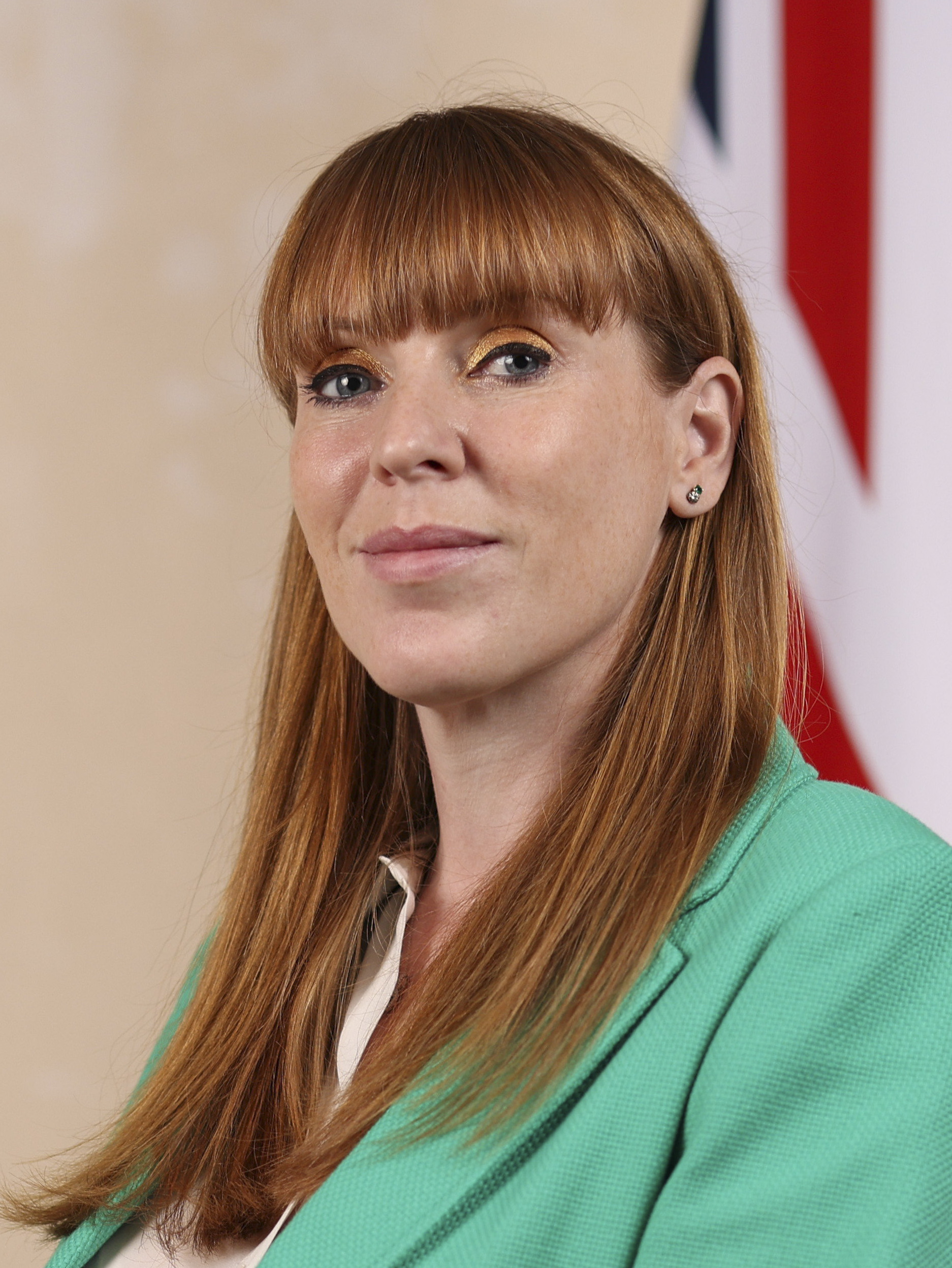
- Rayner in 2024
- Date: 28 August 2025 – 5 September 2025
- Duration: 8 days
- Location: United Kingdom
- Also known as: Angela Rayner stamp duty controversy, Three homes controversy
- Cause: £40,000 underpayment of stamp duty on Hove property purchase
- Target: Angela Rayner, Deputy Prime Minister of the United Kingdom
- First reporter: The Telegraph
- Outcome: Resignation of Angela Rayner from all government posts and Labour Party deputy leadership
- Inquiries: Investigation by Sir Laurie Magnus, independent adviser on ministerial standards
- Verdict: Cleared of all wrongdoing by HMRC (14 May 2026)
- Publication bans: Court order preventing disclosure of son's trust details (lifted 2 September 2025)

A political controversy emerged in the United Kingdom in August 2025 when it was revealed that Deputy Prime Minister Angela Rayner had underpaid stamp duty by £40,000 on an £800,000 flat in Hove purchased in May 2025. The controversy centred on complex property arrangements involving a trust for her disabled son and conflicting declarations about her primary residence to different authorities.

Events unfolded over eight days from 28 August to 5 September 2025. Following media scrutiny, Rayner admitted the error on 3 September 2025 and referred herself to the Prime Minister's independent adviser on ministerial standards. After the ethics adviser found she had not met the "highest possible standards of proper conduct", Rayner resigned from all her posts on 5 September 2025. Her resignation was widely described as a significant blow to the Starmer ministry and triggered the 2025 British cabinet reshuffle.

== Background ==
Rayner, who served until her resignation as both Deputy Prime Minister and Secretary of State for Housing, Communities and Local Government, has maintained multiple residences in her official roles. These include her constituency home in Ashton-under-Lyne, a grace-and-favour flat at Admiralty House in central London, and the Hove property purchased in May 2025.

The controversy emerged during a period when the Labour government was preparing potential tax increases on property owners as part of efforts to address public finances, making Rayner's tax arrangements particularly politically sensitive.

== Property arrangements ==
=== Ashton-under-Lyne property and the trust arrangement ===
Rayner's constituency home in Ashton-under-Lyne was originally co-owned with her former husband following their divorce in 2023. Described as a "nesting" arrangement, the residence, which underwent some modification to allow for easier every day living for their disabled child. In January 2025, Rayner sold her remaining interest in the property to a trust established for her disabled son. The trust arrangement was reportedly set up following a court order to provide for her son after an injury. The legal basis for the sale of the 25% share in the property to the trust was uncertain. According to documents filed with HM Land Registry, no sale or transfer of that property could take place unless it is in accordance with the terms of the trust, as warranted by a statutory declaration or statement of truth made by the trustee. Rayner's September 2025 statement did not address the sale in the context of the rule against self-dealing, of which prima facie prohibits transactions between a trustee acting in a personal capacity and a trustee acting on behalf of a trust. (Note: Vol. 6) (Note: Vol. 8) Questions have also been raised regarding the price paid, with reports that Rayner's 25% ownership interest may have been overvalued, based on prices paid for surrounding properties.

Despite selling her legal interest to the trust, Rayner continued to declare the Ashton-under-Lyne property as her primary residence for council tax, electoral roll and other purposes with Tameside Council. This arrangement allowed her to avoid paying council tax on her London grace-and-favour flat, as it was not considered her main residence.

=== Hove flat purchase ===
In May 2025, Rayner purchased an £800,000 seafront flat in Hove, East Sussex, having obtained a mortgage and in part, using the proceeds from the sale of her remaining stake in the Ashton-under-Lyne property to her son's trust. She said that she had been advised by both an individual experienced in conveyancing and 2 specialists in trust law, at the time of purchase that she was liable only for the standard rate of stamp duty (£30,000) rather than the higher rate applicable to second homes (£70,000), as she owned no other property following the trust arrangement.

However, the flat was registered with Brighton and Hove Council as a second home for council tax purposes, creating what critics described as an inconsistent classification of her residences across different tax systems. Verrico & Associates managing director Joanna Verrico said that when the property was purchased, "no tax or trust advice was provided".

== Allegations ==
Details first became public on 28 August 2025, when The Telegraph reported that Rayner had removed her name from the deeds of her constituency residence weeks before purchasing the Hove flat, potentially reducing her stamp duty liability by £40,000. On 3 September 2025, The Telegraph alleged that Rayner had used NHS compensation money from a trust set up to care for her disabled son to purchase her Hove apartment, having sold a 25 per cent share of her house in Ashton-under-Lyne to his trust for £162,500 in January 2025.

Verrico say that "the stamp duty for the Hove flat was calculated using HMRC's own online calculator based on the figures and the information provided by Ms Rayner". Managing director Joanna Verrico stated "we are probably being made scapegoats for all this and I have got the arrows stuck in my back to show it".

== Political reactions ==
=== Opposition response ===
Conservative Party chairman Kevin Hollinrake wrote to the Prime Minister's independent adviser on ministerial standards requesting an investigation into whether Rayner had breached the Ministerial Code. Hollinrake characterised the arrangement as "hypocritical tax avoidance", arguing that it was inappropriate for a minister who supported higher taxes on family homes to seek to minimise her own tax liability.

The Conservatives also initiated legal processes to challenge Rayner's electoral registration in Ashton-under-Lyne, saying she did not meet the legal tests for residency there. They argued that if successful, this would make her liable for council tax on her London flat, potentially costing an additional £2,000 annually with the second-home premium.

Conservative leader Kemi Badenoch called for Rayner's dismissal, stating: "If Keir Starmer had a backbone, he'd sack Angela Rayner immediately. She has to go."

=== Government defence ===
Initially, both Rayner's spokesperson and Health Minister Stephen Kinnock defended her actions, stating she had paid the "relevant duty" in line with the rules and "entirely properly". Kinnock said Rayner had done "absolutely nothing wrong" and had "complied with the letter of the law". Prime Minister Sir Keir Starmer backed Rayner after her admission, stating he was "very proud to sit alongside" his deputy, praising her transparency in referring herself to the ethics adviser. Peter Kyle defended Rayner, stating: "Just because it is Angela, with her accent and her background, people are treating her in a way they wouldn't, that if a Tory MP who was born in wealth had a second home, which many of them do already". Chancellor Rachel Reeves said that she had "full confidence" in Rayner. Later that day, the BBC reported that Keir Starmer had repeatedly refused to say whether he would dismiss Rayner if his standards adviser concluded she had breached the ministerial code, stating he would "of course act" on the adviser's report once published.

=== Criticism from other parties ===
On 3 September 2025, Reform UK Deputy Leader Richard Tice called for Rayner's resignation, describing her as "the biggest hypocrite in the land" for her criticism of opposing politicians whilst in opposition. In contrast, Liberal Democrat leader Ed Davey expressed understanding for Rayner's situation, stating that he trusted she was acting in her family's interests and that it was not the Liberal Democrats' role to call for resignations unless the ethics advisor found a rules breach.

== Rayner response ==
On 3 September 2025, Rayner admitted she had underpaid stamp duty on the Hove property. In a statement and interview with Sky News, she revealed that a court order preventing her from disclosing information about her son's trust had been lifted the previous evening, allowing her to speak publicly about the arrangements.

Rayner stated: "When purchasing the property my understanding, on advice from lawyers, was that my circumstances meant I was liable for the standard rate of stamp duty." She said that she had subsequently sought further advice from a leading tax counsel following media scrutiny and learned that "the application of complex deeming provisions which relate to my son's trust gives rise to additional stamp duty liabilities." Tax experts explained that even if you own no other property, a deeming rule can apply if there is a trust in favour of children under the age of 18 such that each parent is deemed to own that property for stamp duty purposes.

She described herself as "devastated" by the error and said she had considered resigning to protect her disabled son from public scrutiny, stating: "I acted in good faith but recognise that the incorrect duty was paid, and I have now taken steps to resolve this."

=== Referral to ethics adviser ===
Rayner referred herself to Sir Laurie Magnus, the Prime Minister's independent adviser on ministerial interests, for investigation. She stated she would cooperate fully with the investigation and was working with expert lawyers and HM Revenue and Customs (HMRC) to resolve the matter and pay what was due.

== Resignation ==
On 5 September 2025, following the publication of Sir Laurie Magnus's report which concluded that she had not met the "highest possible standards of proper conduct", Rayner announced her resignation from government and as Deputy Leader of the Labour Party. In her resignation letter to Prime Minister Sir Keir Starmer, she wrote that she "did not meet the highest standards" and expressed "deep regret" for failing to seek specialist tax advice given her position as Housing Secretary and the complexity of her family arrangements. She said she took "full responsibility for this error" but insisted it had "never been [her] intention to do anything other than pay the right amount".

In his reply, Starmer described her decision as "very painful" but "the right one", praising her contribution to Labour's 2024 general election victory and her work in government. He said she remained a "major figure" in the party.

Her resignation prompted a significant cabinet reshuffle. David Lammy was appointed Deputy Prime Minister and Justice Secretary, with Shabana Mahmood moving to the Home Office and Yvette Cooper becoming Foreign Secretary. Steve Reed was promoted to Housing Secretary.

Rayner's departure was widely described as a blow to Starmer's authority, with commentators suggesting that the forthcoming Labour deputy leadership election could reopen divisions within the party. Due to the ongoing investigation as of February 2026, it was viewed by the media that it would prevent Rayner from launching a leadership challenge.

== Verdict ==
On 14 May 2026, Rayner was cleared of all wrongdoing by HMRC, having settled the unpaid tax, negating any penalties. Talking to ITV News, Rayner welcomed the HMRC's findings and accepted that she breached ministerial code by not seeking further professional tax advice. Labour MPs including Tracy Brabin and Chris Webb expressed relief and resolve regarding HMRC's verdict, with Webb making clear that Rayner "wants to play her part" in the government. Both Webb and Oldham Council leader Arooj Shah felt that many people owed Rayner an apology for the way she had been treated.

Tax Policy Associates identified three possibilities as to why the Schedule 24 technical question of the Finance Act 2007, "did the taxpayer take the care that a reasonable person in their position would take?", did not result in a penalty being issued by HMRC. These possibilities include HMRC potentially misapplying the law, mitigating factors that were previously undocumented or that their own interpretation of the law was wrong. TPA concluded that Rayner did not take reasonable steps as a taxpayer and that the verdict raises "consistency questions". Stamp duty expert Sean Randall, interviewed by The Times, expressed confusion on HMRC's decision not to fine Rayner, naming intentional and careless as two pathways that lead to a fine, citing the latter for Rayner's case. Likewise, Tax Policy Associates founder Dan Neidle did not know why HMRC came to a different verdict to Sir Laurie Magnus, saying "it is hard to see how a taxpayer, undertaking a complex transaction involving a court ordered trust, twice told to obtain specialist tax advice, can be said to have taken reasonable care by not doing so.” The Telegraph alleged that this case implied "...a two-tier system for tax cases".

== See also ==
- Committee on Standards in Public Life
