= May ministry =

May ministry may refer to:

- First May ministry, the British majority (later caretaker) government led by Theresa May from 2016 to 2017
- Second May ministry, the British minority government led by Theresa May from 2017 to 2019

== See also ==
- Premiership of Theresa May
