= Angela Rayner =

British politician and government minister

The Right Honourable Angela Rayner MP
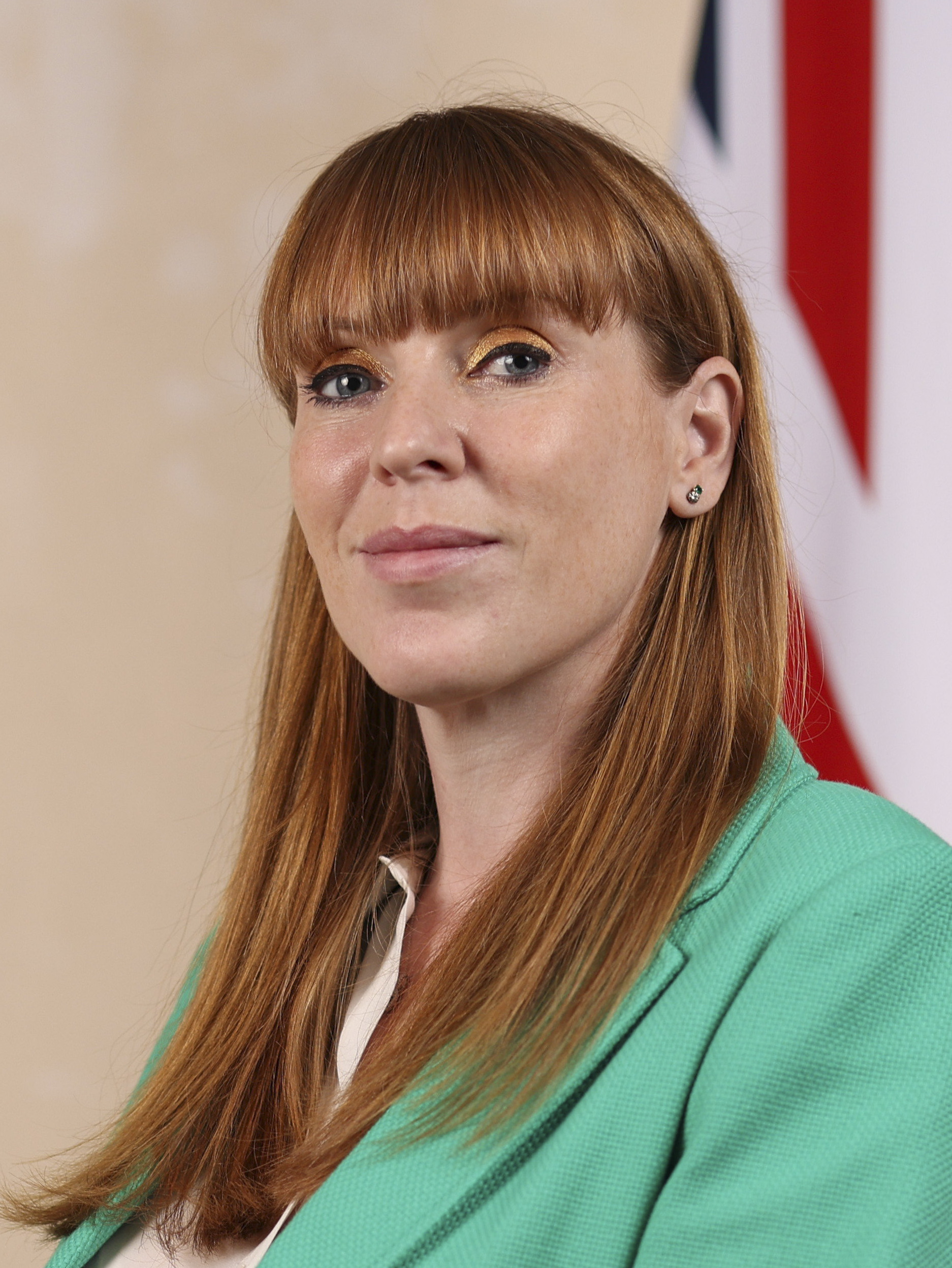
- Official portrait, 2024

Secretary of State for Housing, Communities and Local Government
- Incumbent
- Assumed office 20 July 2026
- Prime Minister: Andy Burnham
- Preceded by: Steve Reed
- In office 5 July 2024 – 5 September 2025
- Prime Minister: Keir Starmer
- Preceded by: Michael Gove (Note: As Secretary of State for Levelling Up, Housing and Communities. Department was renamed MHCLG by Starmer and position followed.)
- Succeeded by: Steve Reed

Deputy Prime Minister of the United Kingdom
- In office 5 July 2024 – 5 September 2025
- Monarch: Charles III
- Prime Minister: Keir Starmer
- Preceded by: Oliver Dowden
- Succeeded by: David Lammy
Party political offices
Deputy Leader of the Labour Party
In office 4 April 2020 – 5 September 2025
Leader	Keir Starmer
Preceded by	Tom Watson (Note: Office vacant from December 2019 to April 2020.)
Succeeded by	Lucy Powell (Note: Office vacant from September to October 2025.)
Chair of the Labour Party
In office 5 April 2020 – 8 May 2021
Leader	Keir Starmer
Preceded by	Ian Lavery
Succeeded by	Anneliese Dodds
Labour Party National Campaign Coordinator
In office 5 April 2020 – 8 May 2021
Leader	Keir Starmer
Preceded by	Ian Lavery; Andrew Gwynne
Succeeded by	Shabana Mahmood
Shadow portfolios
Senior portfolios
2020–2024	Deputy Leader of the Opposition
2023–2024	Deputy Prime Minister
2023–2024	Levelling Up, Housing and Communities
2021–2023	Duchy of Lancaster & Cabinet Office
2021–2023	Future of Work
2020–2023	First Secretary of State
2016–2020	Education
Junior portfolios
2016–2016	Women and Equalities
2016–2016	Pensions

Member of Parliament for Ashton-under-Lyne
- Incumbent
- Assumed office 7 May 2015
- Preceded by: David Heyes
- Majority: 6,791 (19.1%)

Personal details
- Born: Angela Bowen; 28 March 1980 (age 46) Stockport, Greater Manchester, England
- Party: Labour
- Spouse: Mark Rayner (m. 2010; sep. 2020)
- Domestic partners: Neil Batty (1995–2005); Sam Tarry (2022–2023, 2025–present)
- Children: 3
- Education: Stockport College (NVQ)
- Website: www.angelarayner.co.uk

Angela Rayner (née Bowen; born 28 March 1980) is a British politician and trade unionist who has served as Secretary of State for Housing, Communities and Local Government since 2026, having previously held the role from 2024 to 2025. She has been the Member of Parliament (MP) for Ashton-under-Lyne since 2015. She served as Deputy Leader of the Labour Party from 2020 to 2025, and as Deputy Prime Minister of the United Kingdom from July 2024 until her resignation in September 2025. Ideologically, she identifies as a socialist and as part of Labour's soft left.

Rayner was born and raised in Stockport, where she attended the comprehensive Avondale School. She left school aged 16 whilst pregnant and without any qualifications. She later trained in social care at Stockport College and worked for the local council as a care worker. After less than a year of working she became a trade union representative within Unison, during which time she joined the Labour Party. She was selected to contest Ashton‑under‑Lyne in 2014 and was elected for the seat at the 2015 general election.

From 2016 until 2020, Rayner held several Shadow Cabinet positions under Jeremy Corbyn. She successfully stood for the deputy leadership of the Labour Party in 2020, and held further Shadow Cabinet positions under Keir Starmer. Following Labour's victory in the 2024 general election, Rayner entered government and was appointed Deputy Prime Minister and Secretary of State for Housing, Communities and Local Government by Starmer in his government; she resigned from both roles in September 2025 after a report concluded that she had broken the Ministerial Code by underpaying stamp duty on a property purchase, to which she had admitted. She was later cleared of deliberate wrongdoing in May 2026. In July of the same year, Rayner made a return to government in her previous position as Housing Secretary under Prime Minister Andy Burnham.

== Early life and career ==
Angela Bowen was born on 28 March 1980 in Stockport, Greater Manchester. She grew up in poverty on a council estate with her older brother and younger sister and says she could have been taken into care. Her mother's bipolar disorder impacted the family; Rayner has stated: "When I was young, we didn't have books because my mother could not read or write." Her website describes how, "[f]or the most part, I was raised by my grandma who worked at three jobs to put food on the table and didn't stop until the day she died – three days before her 65th birthday."

Rayner attended Avondale High School in Stockport. At age 16, she became pregnant and left school without obtaining any qualifications. She later studied part-time at Stockport College, a school of further education, learning British Sign Language and gaining a National Vocational Qualifications (NVQ) Level 2 in social care. Rayner has spoken about how the Sure Start centres of the New Labour governments of Tony Blair and Gordon Brown assisted her as a young mother with little support.

Rayner worked for Stockport Metropolitan Borough Council as a care worker for a number of years. During this time, she was also elected as a trade union representative for Unison. She was later elected as convenor of Unison North West, becoming the union's most senior official in the region, during which time she joined the Labour Party. In 2012, The Guardian featured a lengthy profile of Rayner as part of an article on a trade union officer's working life.

== Parliamentary career ==
All the previous MPs who have represented my historic constituency have had one thing in common that I do not share: they have all been men. Today, I stand here making my maiden speech as the first woman MP to serve Ashton-under-Lyne in 183 years, and, as the first woman MP, I promise that I will do all in my power to live up to the examples shown by my predecessors. Of course, I could never fill their shoes—mine tend to have three-inch heels and to be rather more colourful—but I walk in their footsteps. We are different, and I will be different, but we are equal too.

— Angela Rayner in her maiden speech to the House of Commons, June 2015.

In 2013, she sought selection to be the Labour Party's prospective parliamentary candidate for Manchester Withington. However, Jeff Smith was selected and has been the incumbent since 2015.

In September 2014, Rayner was selected as the Labour Party's prospective parliamentary candidate for Ashton-under-Lyne. She was elected as MP for Ashton-under-Lyne at the 2015 general election with 48.1% of the vote and a majority of 10,756 votes. She made her maiden speech in the House of Commons on 2 June 2015. At the 2017 general election, Rayner was re-elected as MP for Ashton-under-Lyne with an increased vote share of 60.4% and an increased majority of 11,295 votes. At the 2019 general election, Rayner was re-elected as MP for Ashton-under-Lyne with a decreased vote share of 48.1% and a decreased majority of 4,263. At the 2024 general election, Rayner was re-elected as MP for Ashton-under-Lyne with a decreased vote share of 43.9% and an increased majority of 6,791.

Rayner nominated Andy Burnham in the 2015 Labour leadership election, but was one of just 18 MPs to back the incumbent Jeremy Corbyn against Owen Smith in the 2016 leadership election.

=== Shadow minister (2016–2024) ===
On 1 July 2016, after a series of resignations from the shadow cabinet in protest at his leadership, Corbyn appointed Rayner as Shadow Secretary of State for Education. She supported the notion of a 'National Education Service' to be modelled along similar lines to the National Health Service (NHS), also promoting an increase in funding for early years education. She was considered by some as a possible future Labour leader.

=== Deputy Labour leader (2020–2025) ===
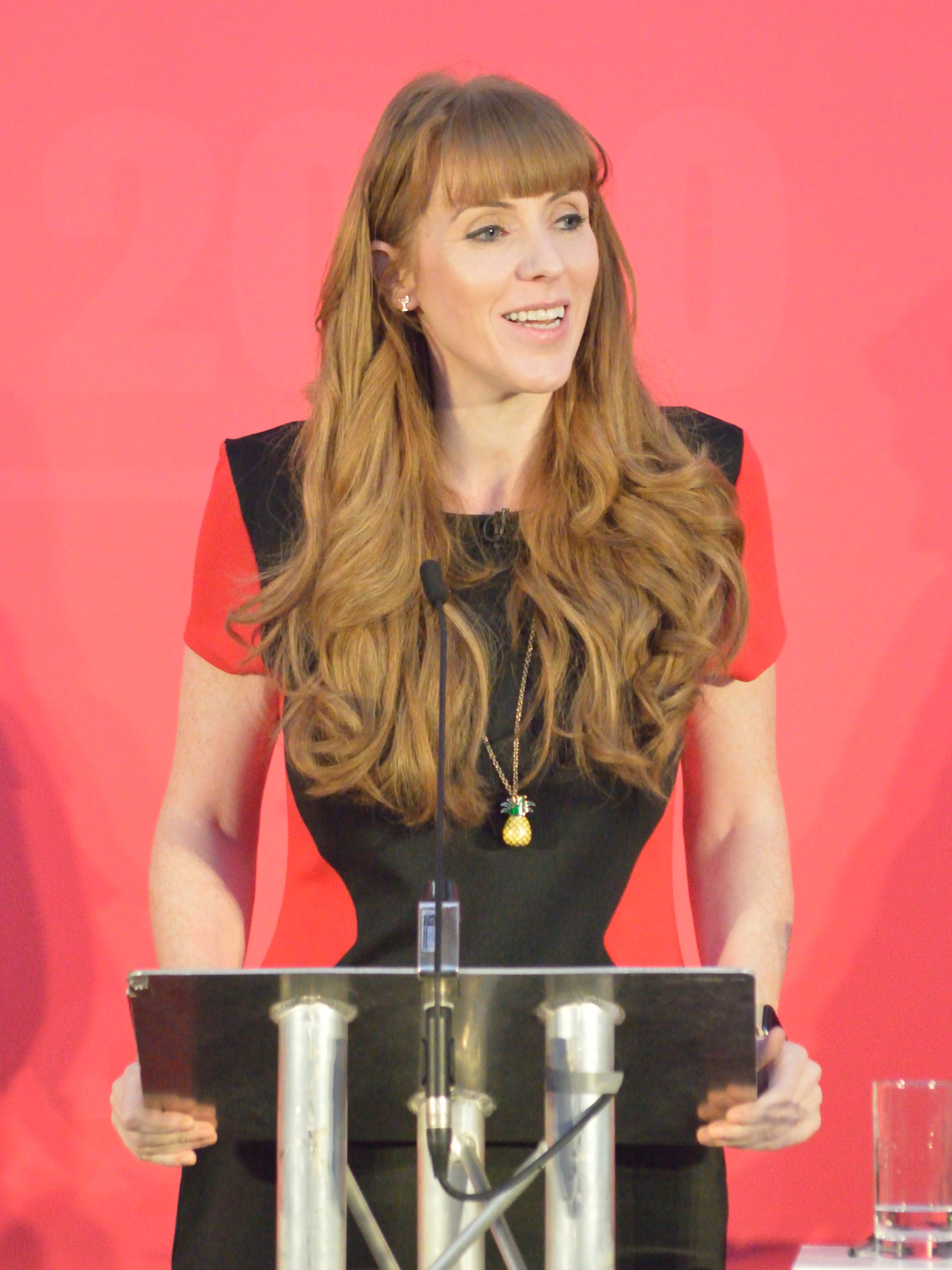
Rayner speaking at the 2020 Labour Party deputy leadership election hustings in Bristol

Rayner did not stand for the Labour leadership in the 2020 leadership election, and supported Rebecca Long-Bailey, who came second to Keir Starmer. However, Rayner stood for the deputy leadership in the 2020 deputy leadership election. She achieved sufficient support from affiliates to qualify for the final ballot on 20 January, at which point she also had the greatest number of nominations from CLPs. The results were announced on 4 April 2020, with Rayner announced as the winner and becoming deputy leader, succeeding Tom Watson.

In the days following, she was appointed Deputy Leader of the Opposition, Shadow First Secretary of State and Chair of the Labour Party. Rayner was appointed to the Privy Council on 12 February 2021. On 9 April 2020, the Labour Party announced that Rayner would deputise for Starmer opposite Dominic Raab during Prime Minister's Questions. She deputised opposite Raab during Boris Johnson and Rishi Sunak's premierships, and also deputised opposite Oliver Dowden during the Sunak premiership.

Rayner was removed from her roles as the Labour Party's chair and national campaign coordinator in a reshuffle by Starmer on 8 May 2021, following the 2021 local elections. She was subsequently appointed Shadow Chancellor of the Duchy of Lancaster and Shadow Secretary of State for the Future of Work.

On 4 September 2023, Starmer appointed Rayner as shadow levelling up secretary, and shadow deputy prime minister. Rayner's strong support base and potential as a future leader led to the New Statesman ranking her as the eighth most powerful person in British left-wing politics for 2023.

=== Deputy prime minister (2024–2025) ===
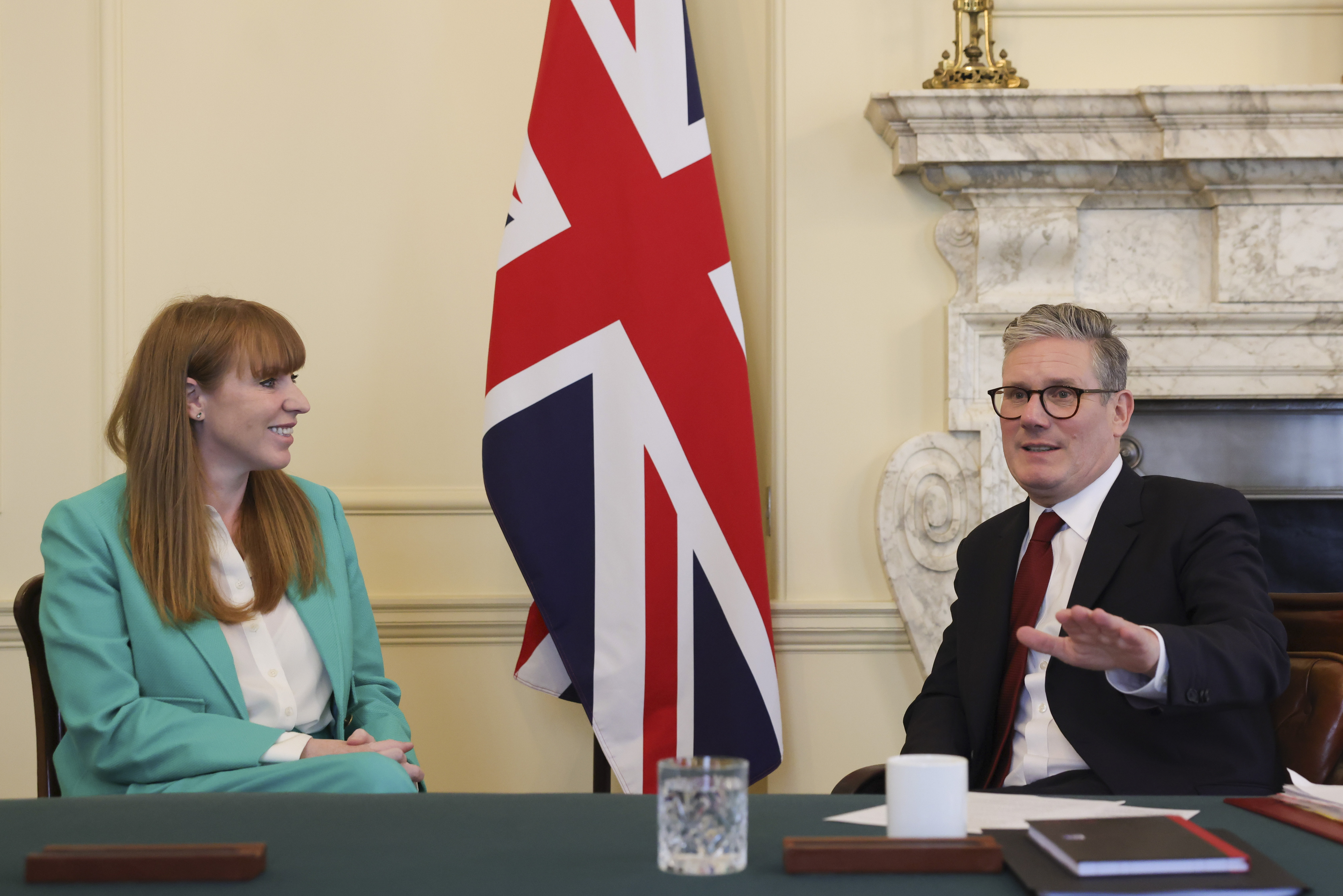
Rayner appointed as Deputy Prime Minister by Keir Starmer, 5 July 2024

Following Labour's landslide victory in the election and the formation of the Starmer ministry, Rayner was appointed to the government as Deputy Prime Minister, and Secretary of State for Housing, Communities and Local Government (known as Secretary of State for Levelling Up, Housing and Communities until 9 July 2024) by Starmer in his government on 5 July 2024.

Rayner condemned the late July and early August riots that started following the Southport stabbing, saying there is "no excuse for thuggery." In her first speech at the Labour Party Conference as Deputy Prime Minister, Rayner opened the conference and said "I want to start off with a thanks to the British people. You entrusted us with the task of change and we will not forget it. You kept faith with us and we will keep faith with you."

As Deputy Prime Minister, Rayner deputised for Starmer at Prime Minister's Questions on four occasions, respectively facing Oliver Dowden, Alex Burghart, Chris Philp and Mel Stride, jokingly saying during the former she would miss her and Dowden's "battle of the gingers".

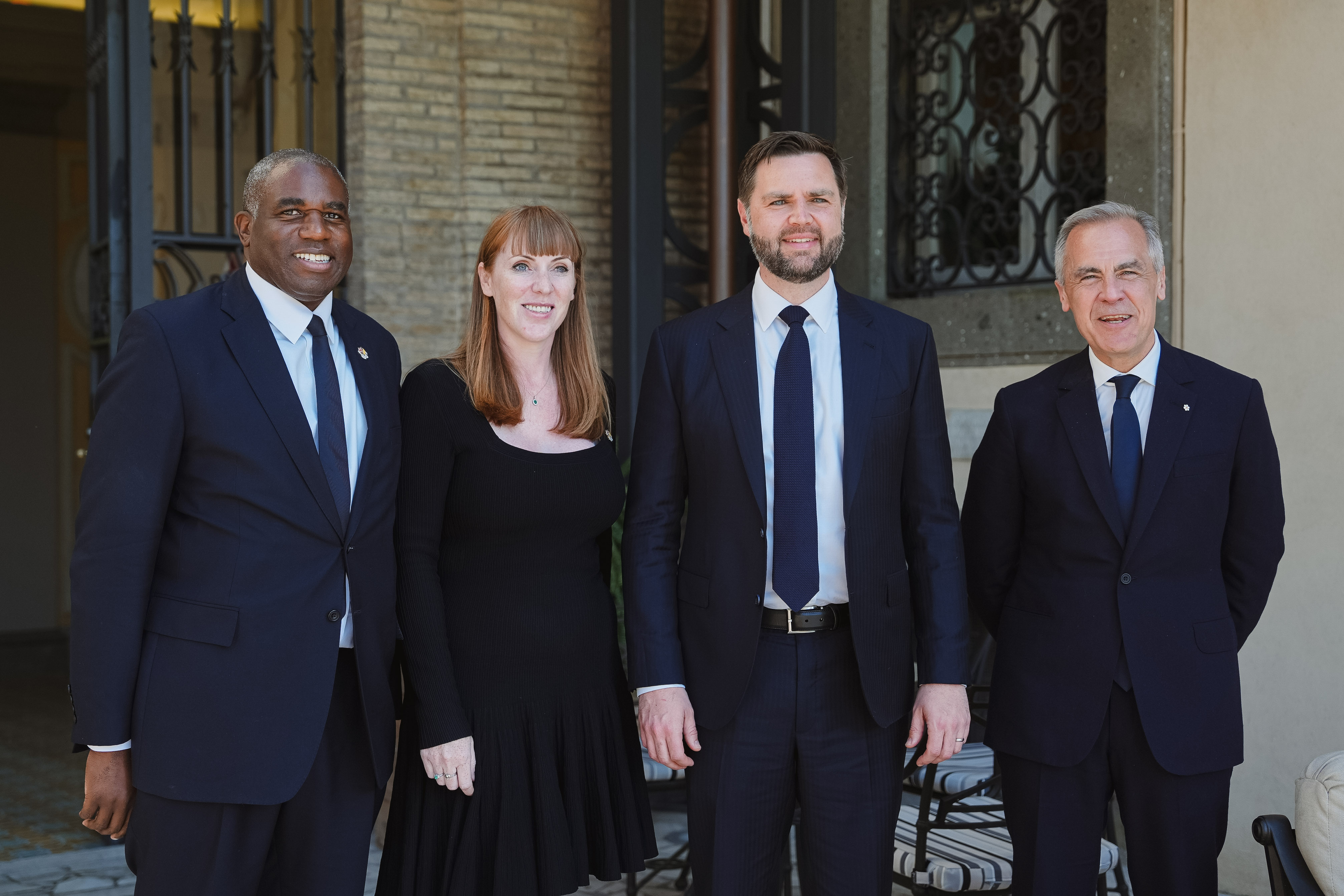
Rayner with Foreign Secretary David Lammy, US Vice President JD Vance, and Canadian Prime Minister Mark Carney at the Vatican in May 2025.

In July 2025, her membership of Unite, one of the largest trade unions was suspended during an escalating dispute with the Starmer government over their role in bin strikes in Birmingham, with media speculation focussing on a possible disaffiliation of the union from the Labour Party. However, Rayner has insisted that she was not a member of Unite at that time.

On 5 September 2025, Rayner resigned from her ministerial position and as the deputy prime minister, and as deputy leader of the party, following the prime minister's ethics adviser, Laurie Magnus, finding that she had breached the ministerial code in relation to her failure to pay the correct amount of tax on one of her properties. This resignation triggered the 2025 British cabinet reshuffle and the 2025 Labour Party deputy leadership election, where she was succeeded by Lucy Powell.

=== Return to the backbenches (2025–2026) ===
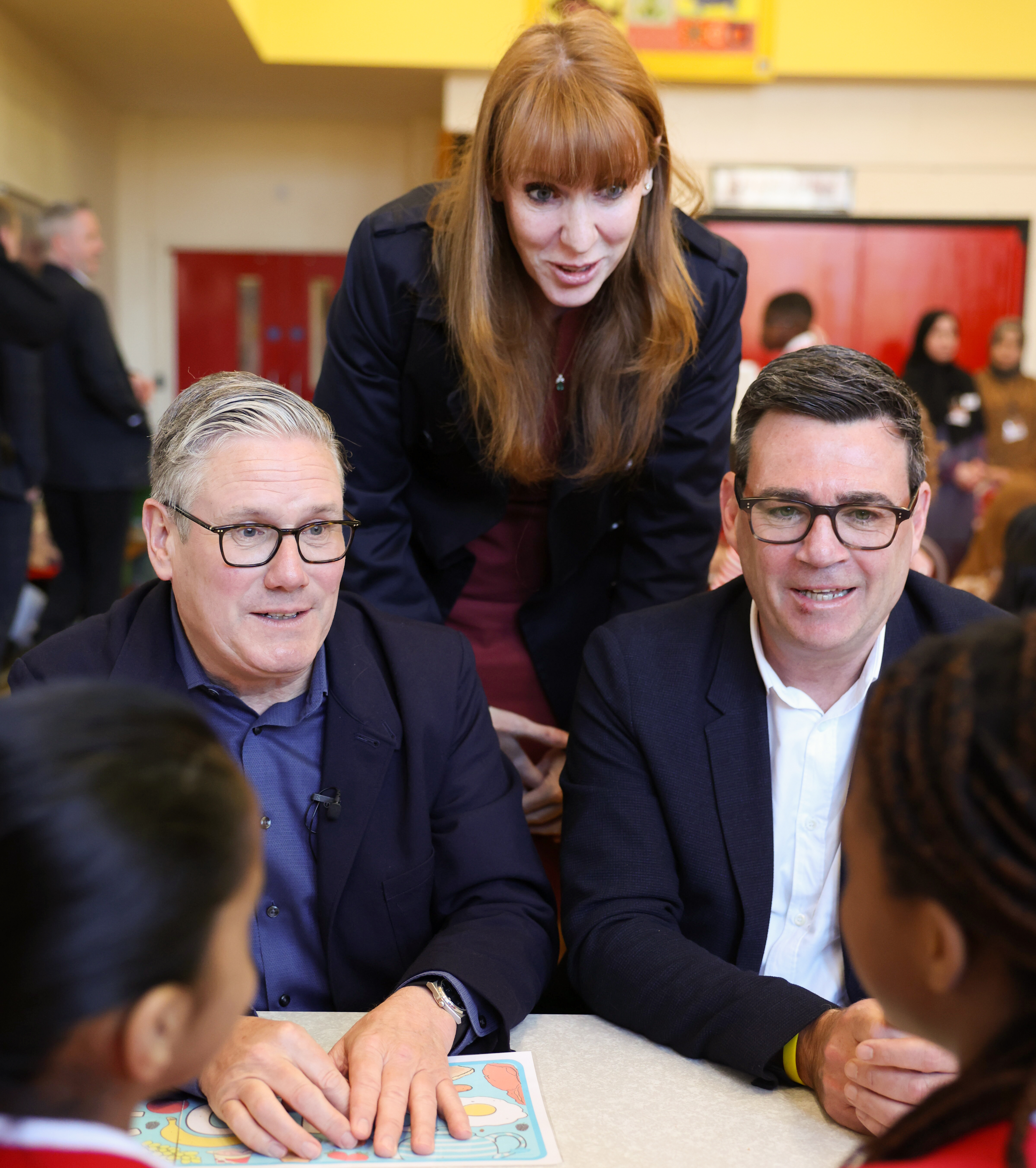
Rayner with Starmer and mayor Andy Burnham in April 2026.

In early February 2026, reports emerged that Rayner had privately warned Starmer against appointing Peter Mandelson as British Ambassador to the United States. Rayner's allies stated that she advised against the move in 2024, citing public evidence of Mandelson's continued friendship with Jeffrey Epstein following the financier's 2008 conviction for child sex offences. Rayner's intervention reportedly highlighted the potential for the appointment to become a significant political liability, a warning that gained renewed attention after Mandelson was sacked from the role in September 2025 following fresh revelations about his ties to Epstein.

During a House of Commons debate, questioned the government's plan for disclosing vetting documents, asking if the Intelligence and Security Committee (ISC) should oversee the process to maintain "public confidence". Her stance effectively forced the government into a U-turn, ensuring that cross-party parliamentarians—rather than just the Cabinet Office—would determine which sensitive documents are released to the public. Following a vote on the Mandelson files, she reportedly told colleagues, "I will be ready", amid mounting pressure questioning Starmer's judgment and position as PM.

Rayner supported Andy Burnham's bid to stand as the Labour candidate in the 2026 Gorton and Denton by-election. After his candidacy was blocked by the party's National Executive Committee (NEC) and the by-election was subsequently won by Green Party candidate Hannah Spencer, Rayner said, "This result must be a wake up call. It's time to really listen – and to reflect."

On 17 March 2026, Rayner made a speech highly critical of the government. The speech was made at the Spring Rally of the Mainstream group of Andy Burnham. At the event held in London, she outlined her opposition to the present policies of Keir Starmer. She warned that government proposals on changes to Indefinite leave to remain are "un-British" and a "breach of trust". She also warned Labour is "running out of time" to deliver the change promised in the general election. This speech reportedly hinted at possible leadership ambitions.

On 10 May 2026, amid the 2026 Labour Party leadership crisis in response to Labour's poor results in the 2026 United Kingdom local elections, Rayner issued a statement critical of Starmer, calling for Andy Burnham to be allowed back to parliament. While she didn't endorse Burnham as a leadership candidate, she said it was a "mistake" for the party's leadership to block him from standing in the 2026 Gorton and Denton by-election. She also called for Labour to give more economic powers to regional mayors and to increase the minimum wage.

Speaking at the Communication Workers Union conference on 11 May 2026, Rayner said that "people have turned to populists and nationalists because we have not done enough to fix it". She called for the party to put "the common interest ahead of factionalism".

=== Housing Secretary (2026–) ===
On 20 July 2026, Rayner was appointed Secretary of State for Housing, Communities and Local Government by Andy Burnham, succeeding Steve Reed. She returned to the same role she had held until September 2025. Shortly after taking office, Rayner declined to repay the £16,876 ministerial severance payment she received after resigning as Housing Secretary in September 2025. She had previously criticised the Conservative ministers for receiving severance payments after they returned to government, saying in 2023 that they had a "staggering lack of shame." In an interview with Matt Chorley, she stated "I had worked in government for a period of time and then I came out of government for just under a year."

On 24 July, Rayner ruled out implementing rent controls in England under Burnham, arguing that changes in the Renters' Rights Act were "already having a significant impact on the market".

== Political positions ==
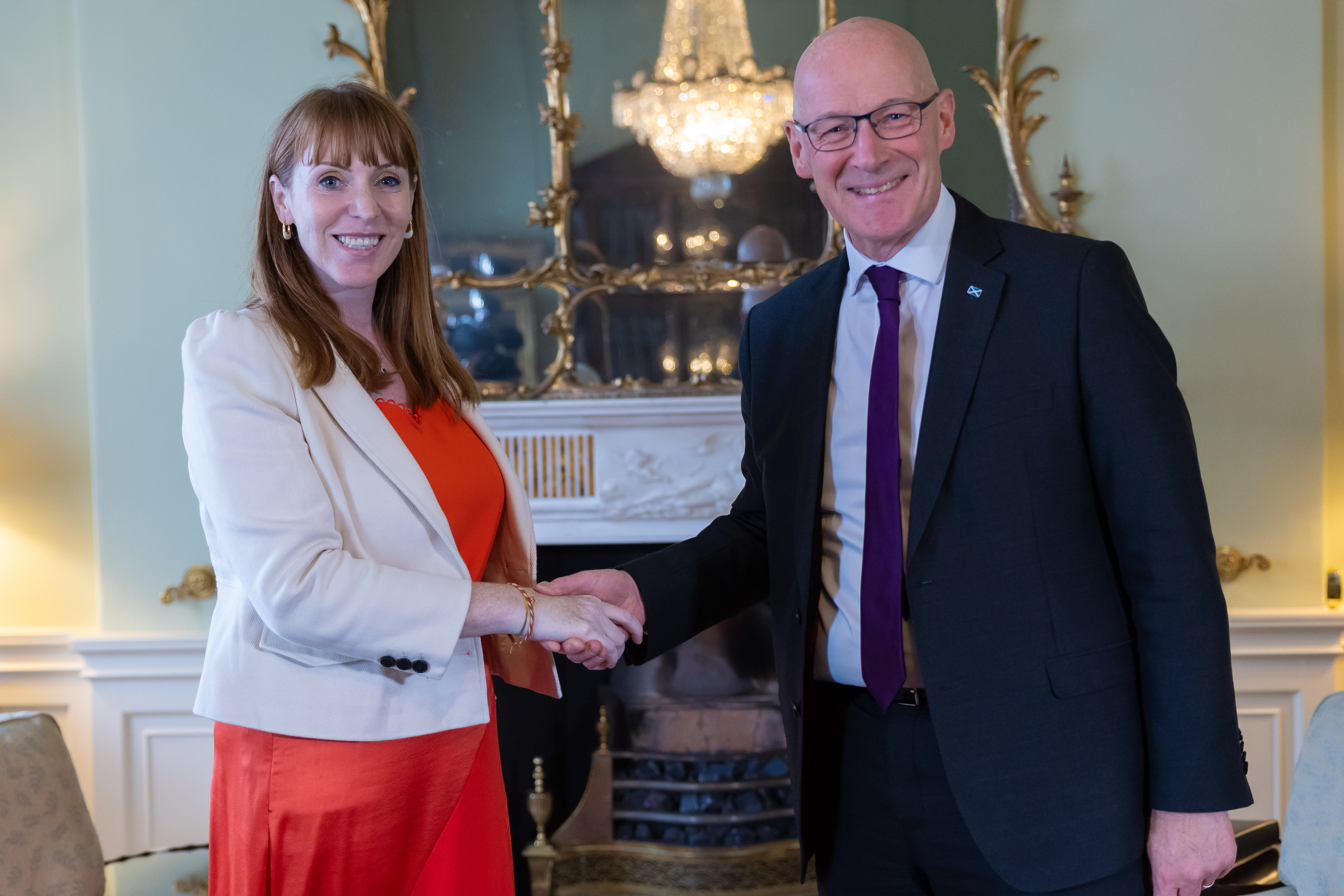
Rayner with Scottish First Minister John Swinney for a bilateral meeting at Bute House in Edinburgh, 15 August 2024

Rayner identifies herself as a socialist. In a 2017 interview to The Guardian which discusses her political beliefs, Rayner highlighted her pragmatism, describing herself as being part of the "soft left" of the Labour Party. She has strongly criticised Corbyn, as he "did not command the respect of the party", and critiqued his lack of "discipline" when it came to dealing with antisemitism in the party.

Rayner has described herself as "quite hardline" on law and order issues, having suffered from antisocial behaviour when she was young. In an interview, she said police should "shoot your terrorists and ask questions second" and that she had told her local police force to "beat down the door of the criminals and sort them out and antagonise them."

Rayner asked Hansard transcribers not to correct her speeches, preferring "to talk naturally" in the Commons "because it's who I am".

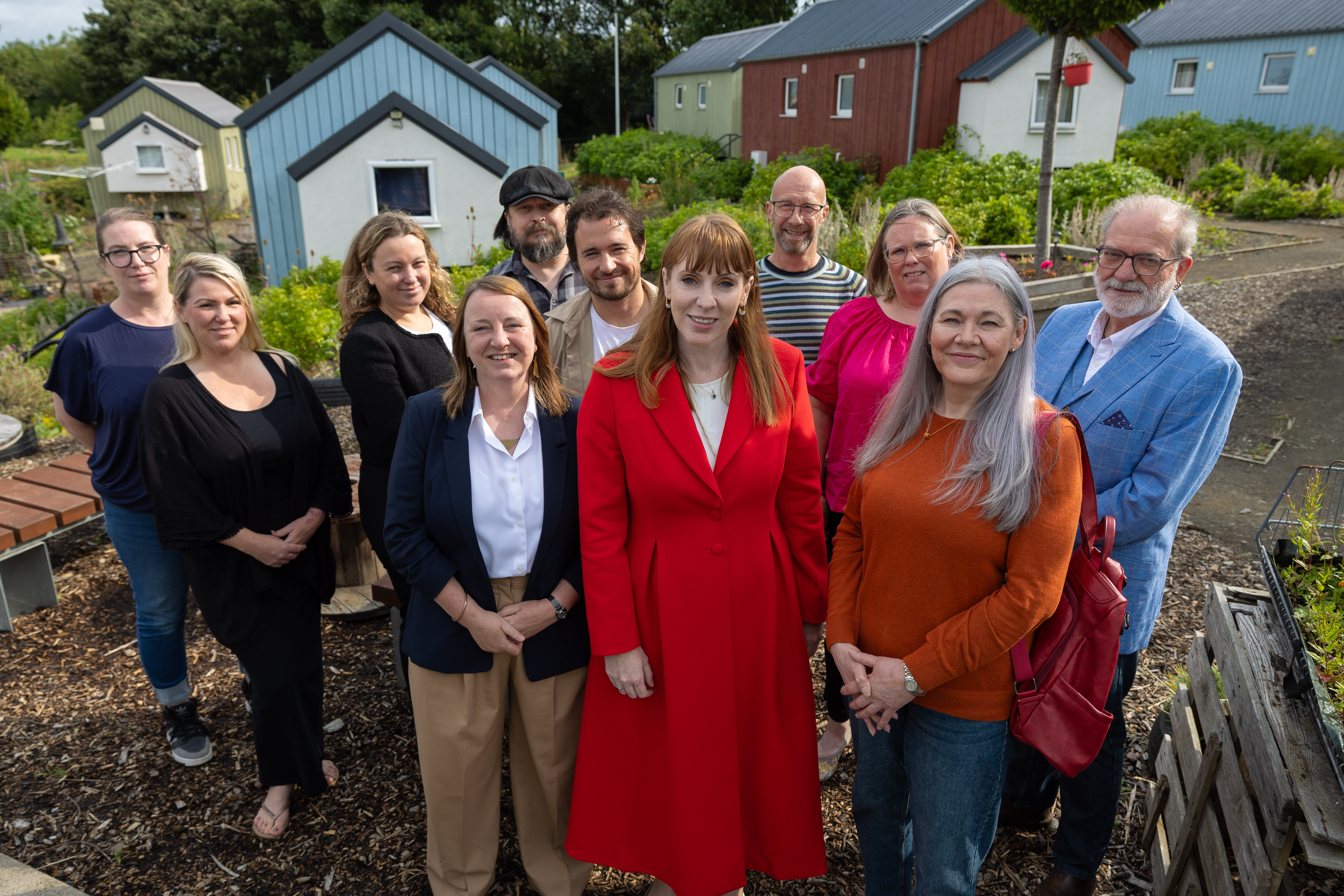
Rayner visiting a homelessness support charity in Edinburgh, 16 August 2024

A member of the Labour Friends of Palestine and the Middle East, Rayner has condemned the killings of Palestinians during the 2018–2019 Gaza border protests and has repeatedly cited Israeli violations of human rights against Palestinians on social media.

In October 2020, Rayner called then Conservative MP Chris Clarkson "scum" as he was giving a speech in Parliament and was rebuked by the Parliament's deputy speaker for doing so. She later apologised. Clarkson had been critical of Andy Burnham, who had been seeking financial support for Greater Manchester following local restrictions on businesses being introduced.

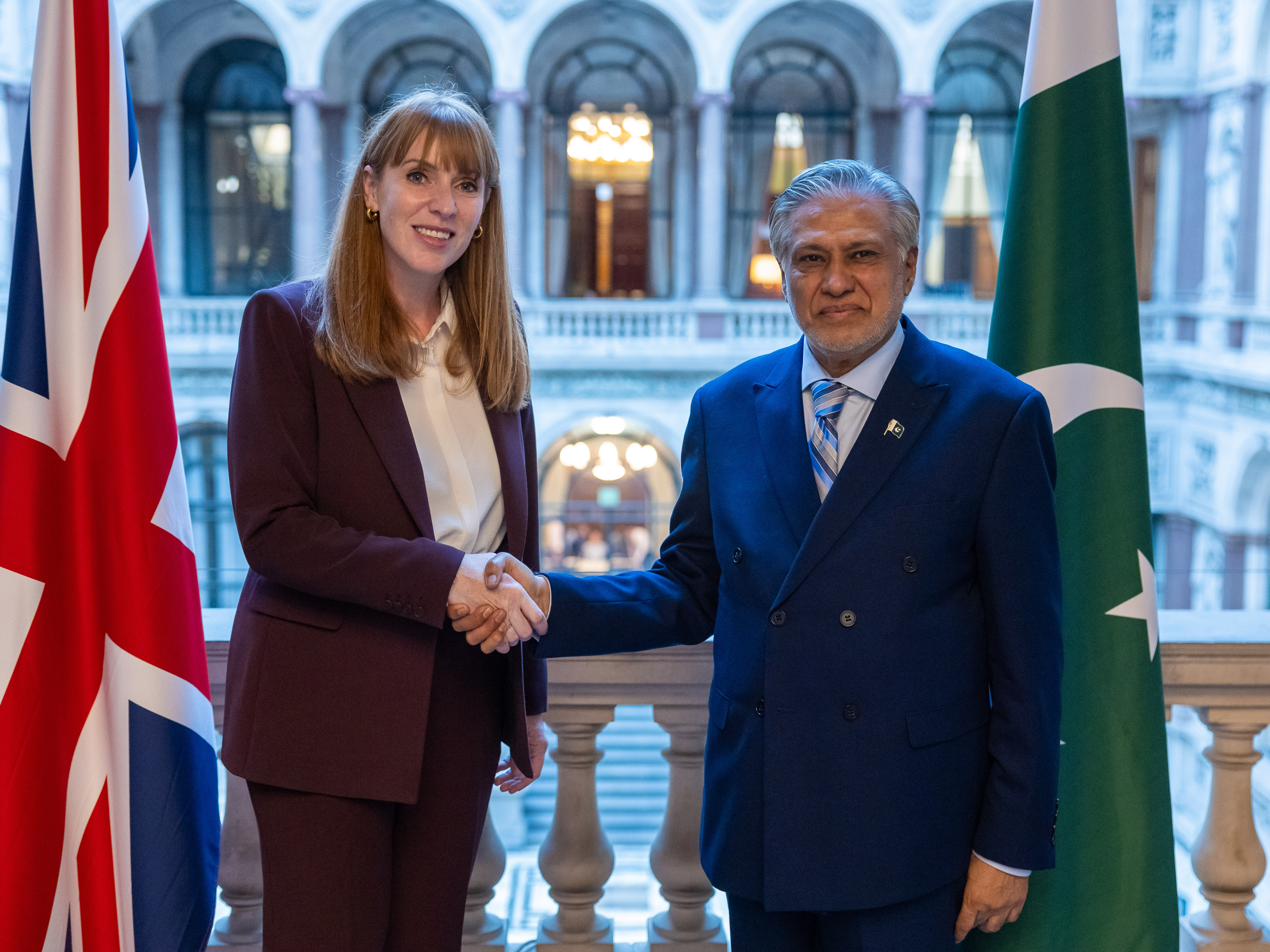
Rayner with Deputy Prime Minister of Pakistan Ishaq Dar, 5 September 2024

In September 2021, Rayner strongly criticised senior members of the Conservative Party, stating: "We cannot get any worse than a bunch of scum, homophobic, racist, misogynistic, absolute pile... of banana republic... Etonian... piece of scum". Some Labour MPs, while saying it was not the language that they would have used, defended her comments, including Steve Reed, John McDonnell and Lisa Nandy. Keir Starmer distanced himself from her remarks, but said it was up to Rayner if she wanted to apologise or not, while other Labour MPs condemned her in stronger terms. Several Conservative MPs, including Grant Shapps, Amanda Milling and Oliver Dowden, condemned her comments. Rayner later apologised for her comments in light of the murder of Conservative MP David Amess the following month.

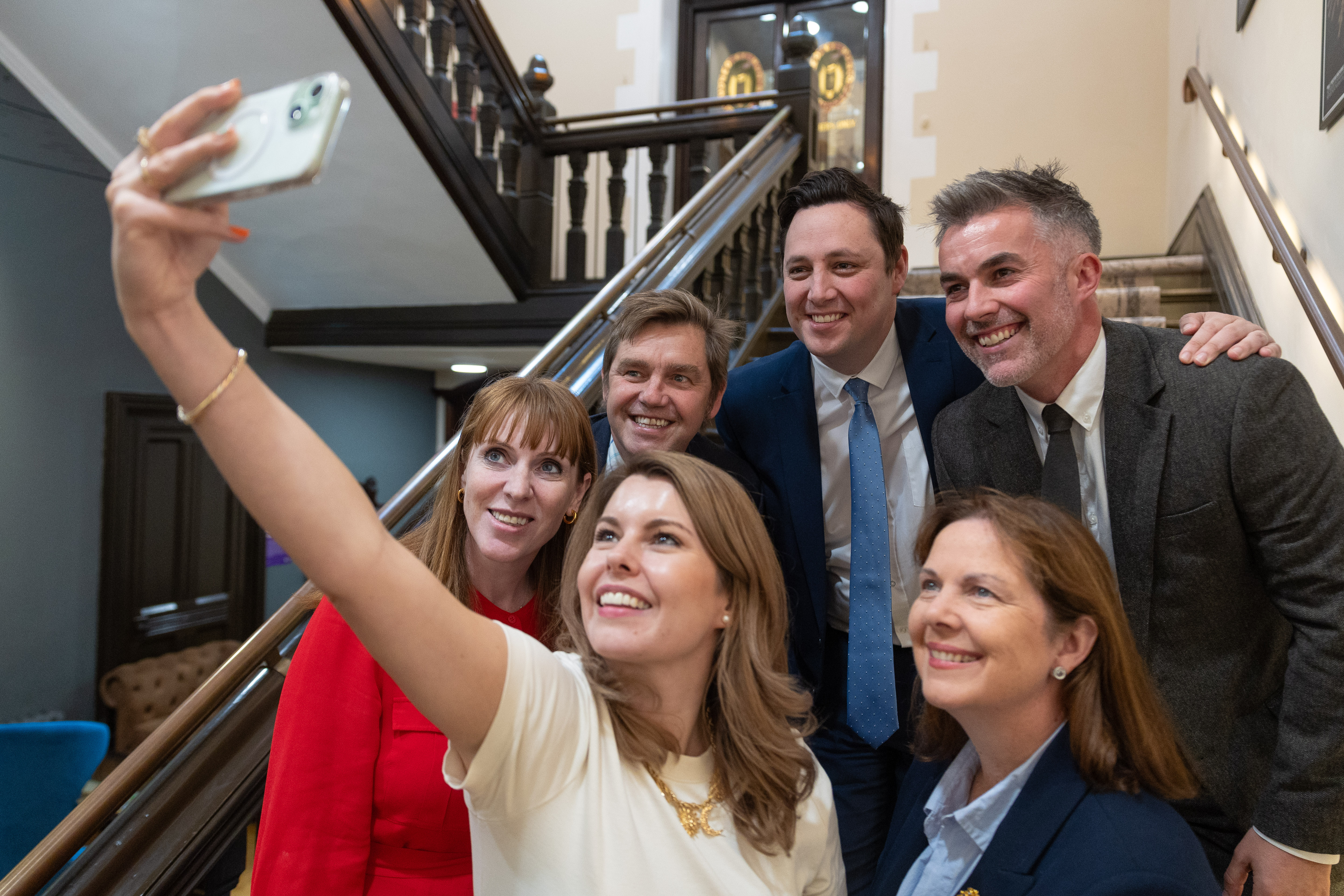
Rayner with regional mayors, 10 October 2024

Rayner campaigned for Britain Stronger in Europe and voted to remain in the European Union (EU) during the 2016 Brexit referendum. After the referendum result, she voted in favour of triggering Article 50, arguing that although she was "fiercely pro-EU" she was "also a democrat". She opposed Labour's policy for a second referendum adopted under Corbyn and argued that it would "undermine democracy". She also opposed a delay to Article 50. When asked how she would vote in a second referendum in December 2019, Rayner said she would vote leave as long as the withdrawal agreement "protects the economy and jobs".

Rayner supports transgender rights, saying that they do not conflict with women's rights. On 2 July 2022, she joined Keir Starmer and other Labour figures at Pride in London as the march marked its 50th anniversary, with calls for LGBT rights reforms including a ban on conversion therapy and changes to the Gender Recognition Act.

After the murder of George Floyd by police officer Derek Chauvin, Rayner supported the Black Lives Matter movement, and took a knee alongside Keir Starmer.

== In popular culture ==
Satirist Jenny Stanton, under the stage name The Intel Lady, regularly parodies Rayner in her stand-up performances and public appearances.

In the inaugural season of Saturday Night Live UK, Rayner was portrayed by Celeste Dring, in a cold open sketch in the season finale where she, Andy Burnham (portrayed by Paddy Young) and Wes Streeting (portrayed by Jack Shep) were having "property viewings" of 10 Downing Street.

== Awards and honours ==
Rayner's strong support base as Deputy Leader of the Labour Party led to the New Statesman ranking her as the eighth most powerful person in British left-wing politics for 2023. The Spectator named her Politician of the Year at its annual Parliamentarian of the Year awards ceremony in 2024.

In December 2024, Rayner was included in the BBC 100 Women 2024, a list of "100 inspiring and influential women from around the world for 2024".

== Personal life ==
=== Relationships and family ===
Between 1995 and 1999, Rayner was in a relationship with Neil Batty. In 1996, aged 16, she gave birth to their son, Ryan. Recalling her experience of being a teenage mother on a council estate, she said that Ryan's birth "actually saved me from where I could have been, because I had a little person to look after." When Ryan's partner had a daughter in November 2017, Rayner became a grandmother at age 37, giving herself the nickname "Grangela".

In September 2010, she married Mark Rayner, a Unison official, with whom she had two more sons, Charlie and Jimmy. Rayner says that the care her son Charlie received after his premature birth demonstrated the importance of the NHS to her. Rayner and her husband separated in 2020.

In the summer of 2022, journalists began reporting Rayner was "in a relationship" with Labour MP Sam Tarry; the relationship ended in 2023, and then resumed.

=== Life during parliamentary career ===
In October 2021, Rayner received a number of death threats and abusive messages. The police arrested a 52-year-old man in Halifax. She cancelled a number of meetings with her constituents because of fears for her own safety. Later, a 36-year-old man from Cambridgeshire was prosecuted after sending her a threatening email. The man pleaded guilty in court to sending the email and was sentenced to 15 weeks in prison, suspended for 18 months. Earlier in March 2019, Rayner said that she had fitted panic buttons at her home after rape and death threats were sent to her.

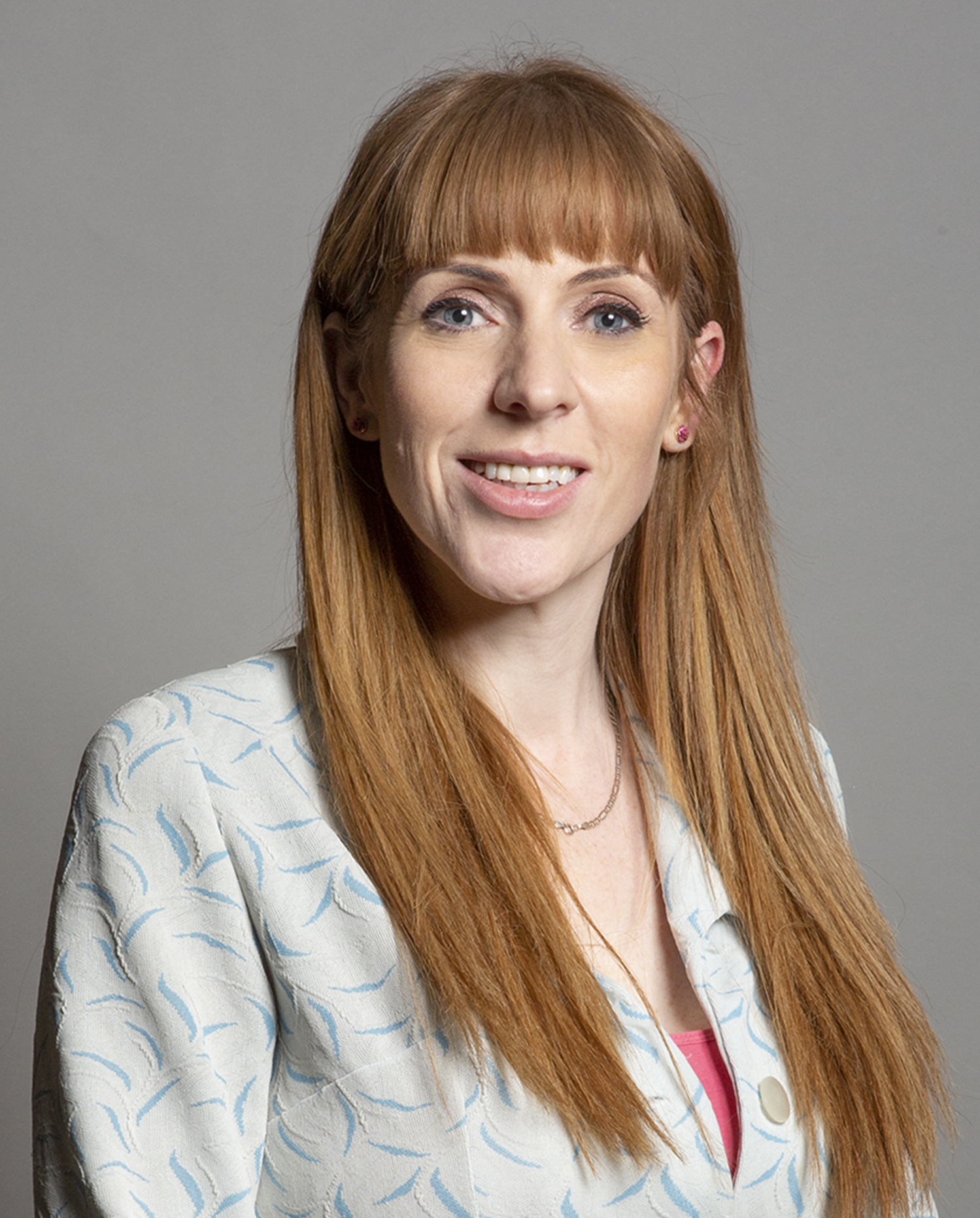
MP portrait, 2020

In the summer of 2022, journalists began reporting that Rayner was in a relationship with Labour MP Sam Tarry. The relationship ended in 2023, and then resumed by 2025.

On 24 April 2022, Rayner was the subject of a report in The Mail on Sunday, by Glen Owen, in which it was alleged that she had tried to distract Boris Johnson in the Commons by crossing and uncrossing her legs in a similar manner to Sharon Stone in a scene from the 1992 film Basic Instinct. The report was subsequently condemned by a range of voices across the political spectrum including Johnson and the Speaker of the House Lindsay Hoyle. The Independent Press Standards Organisation (IPSO) reported that it had received 5,500 complaints about the article and would undertake an investigation. Conservative MP Lia Nici later repeated the allegations in a BBC interview.

In May 2022, Rayner said she would resign as Deputy Leader of the Labour Party if she received a fixed penalty notice for breaching COVID-19 regulations while campaigning during the run-up to the Hartlepool by-election and local elections the previous year. The controversy surrounding the event was dubbed "Beergate". She and Keir Starmer were both cleared by Durham Police in July 2022 who said there was "no case to answer".

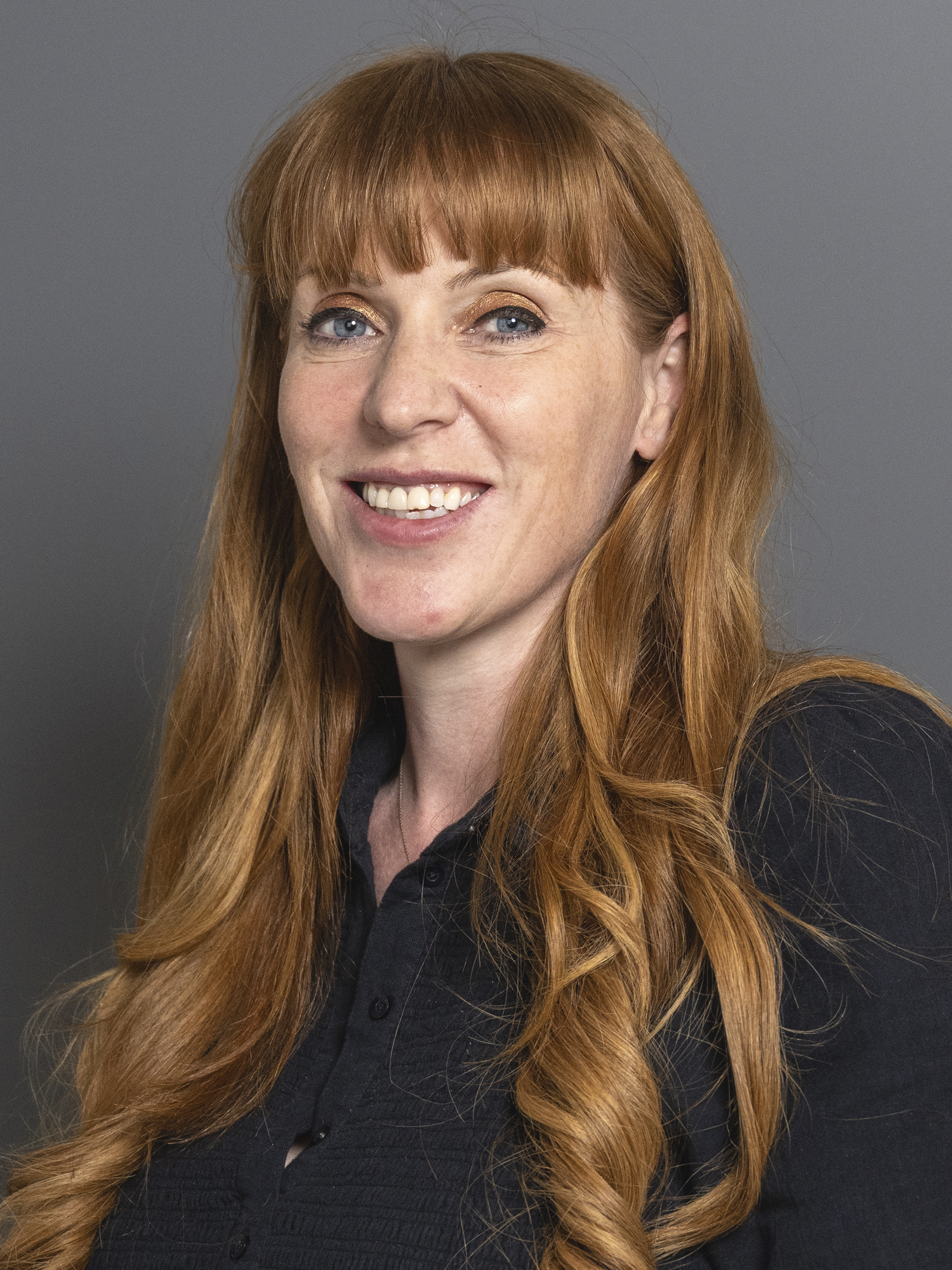
MP portrait, 2024

During the Labour Party freebies controversy in September 2024, the Conservative Party referred Rayner to the Parliamentary Commissioner for Standards, saying that her "failure to properly register" the use of Waheed Alli, Baron Alli's $2.5 million New York apartment may have breached the House of Commons' code of conduct. Ali had given Rayner gifts worth £3,550 of clothes in June 2024. Rayner later announced she would no longer accept clothes from donors.

In March 2024, a former Conservative Party deputy chairman, Michael Ashcroft, alleged that Rayner had misled tax officials in the sale of her ex-council house in 2015. Rayner said that she had done nothing wrong, and declined to publish her tax records or tax advice. Greater Manchester Police said they found no evidence that any offence had been committed. At the request of Conservative MP James Daly, the police agreed to review their decision not to investigate. The police confirmed in April 2024 that they had opened an investigation into the allegations. A poll by the research consultancy Savanta indicated that 56% of Labour voters and 26% of Conservative voters thought the story sounded like a smear campaign. Rayner subsequently said that she would "do the right thing and step down" if she were found to have broken the law. Later that month, Greater Manchester Police and Stockport Metropolitan Borough Council both said that they would take no action against Rayner. Rayner was also cleared by HM Revenue and Customs, which concluded that she did not owe any capital gains tax and thus no action would be taken. Rayner welcomed the announcement, and said the Conservatives had used "desperate tactics" against her.

=== House tax controversy ===
In August 2025, it was reported that Rayner had removed her name from the deeds of her constituency residence in Ashton-under-Lyne weeks before purchasing an £800,000 seafront flat in Hove in May 2025, reportedly reducing her stamp duty liability on the purchase by £40,000. However, for Council Tax purposes the Ashton-under-Lyne home continued to be her primary residence. The Telegraph alleged that Rayner had used NHS compensation money from a trust set up to care for her disabled son to purchase her Hove apartment, having sold her 25 per cent share of the house in Ashton-under-Lyne to his trust for £162,500 in January 2025. Following the report, Conservative Party chairman Kevin Hollinrake wrote to the prime minister's independent adviser on ministerial standards requesting an investigation into whether Rayner had breached the Ministerial Code.

On 3 September, Rayner said she had relied on legal advice that standard stamp duty was due on her Hove flat, but later counsel advised that the trust arrangement for her son meant the higher rate applied; she said she referred herself to the ministerial standards adviser, contacted HMRC to pay any tax owed, and denied attempting to dodge tax. Graffiti was subsequently sprayed on Rayner's Hove flat and surrounding surfaces, including the phrases "Tax Evader Rayner" and "Rayner tax avoidance". The conveyancing firm who handled the purchase of Rayner's flat in Hove, Verrico & Associates, stated that they did not give Rayner tax or trust advice, and that they always direct their clients to accountants or tax experts for such matters. On 5 September 2025, Rayner announced that she was resigning from her ministerial position, as the deputy prime minister and as deputy leader of the party following the prime minister's ethics adviser, Laurie Magnus, finding that she had breached the ministerial code in relation to her failure to pay the correct amount of tax on one of her properties.

On 14 May 2026, Rayner was cleared of all wrongdoing by HMRC, having settled the unpaid tax, negating any penalties. Talking to ITV News, Rayner welcomed the HMRC's findings and accepted that she breached ministerial code by not seeking further professional tax advice.

== Notes ==
Parliament of the United Kingdom
Preceded by David Heyes	Member of Parliament for Ashton-under-Lyne; 2015–present	Incumbent
Political offices
Preceded by Pat Glass	Shadow Secretary of State for Education; 2016–2020	Succeeded by Rebecca Long-Bailey
Preceded by Emily Thornberry	Shadow Deputy Prime Minister of the United Kingdom; 2020–2024	Succeeded by Sir Oliver Dowden
Preceded by Tom Watson	Deputy Leader of the Opposition; 2020–2024	Succeeded by Sir Oliver Dowden
Preceded by Rachel Reeves	Shadow Chancellor of the Duchy of Lancaster; 2021–2024	Succeeded by Sir Oliver Dowden
Preceded by Rachel Reeves	Shadow Minister for the Cabinet Office; 2021–2023	Succeeded by Jenny Chapman
Preceded by Lisa Nandy	Shadow Secretary of State for Levelling Up, Housing and Communities; 2023–2024	Succeeded by Kemi Badenoch
Preceded by Sir Oliver Dowden	Deputy Prime Minister of the United Kingdom; 2024–2025	Succeeded by David Lammy
Preceded by Michael Gove	Secretary of State for Housing, Communities and Local Government; 2024–2025	Succeeded by Steve Reed
Party political offices
Preceded by Tom Watson	Deputy Leader of the Labour Party; 2020–2025	Succeeded by Lucy Powell
Preceded by Ian Lavery	Chair of the Labour Party; 2020–2021	Succeeded by Anneliese Dodds
Preceded by Ian Lavery & Andrew Gwynne	Labour Party National Campaign Coordinator; 2020–2021	Succeeded by Shabana Mahmood
