= The Women Who Made Modern Economics =

2023 non-fiction book by Rachel Reeves

- Author: Rachel Reeves
- Language: English
- Publisher: Basic Books
- Publication date: 2023
- Publication place: United Kingdom
- Media type: Print
- Pages: 288
- ISBN: 9781399807470

The Women Who Made Modern Economics is a 2023 non-fiction book written by then Labour Shadow Chancellor Rachel Reeves, covering women in economics through biographical sketches of a collection of female economists.

== Synopsis ==
The book profiles notable female economists. These include Beatrice Webb, Eleanor Rathbone, Mary Paley Marshall, Harriet Martineau, Anna Schwartz, Carmen Reinhart, among others.

== Reception ==
Tanushree Kaushal, writing for the LSE Review of Books, found the book written from Labour's and particularly Reeves' securonomics point of view. Kaushal contrasted the "elaborate and overall largely positive" chapter on Beatrice Webb, with the "less forgiving" chapter on Rosa Luxembourg, a position that they thought "prevent[ed] a more in-depth reading of Luxembourg’s scholarship".

Multiple reviews thought the work was a good way to gauge Reeves intentions for a possible future Chancellorship. Heather Stewart, in a review in The Guardian, found that while the "segue from scholarly exposition to personal manifesto can be clunky", the work as a whole represented "something much more like the outlines of a coherent political project here than Labour is sometimes credited with". John King, in the History of Economics Review, felt that Reeves was "clear about her intention to apply the lessons learned from [the stories in the book] to the British economy".

Kaushal found Reeves' "writing [was] often clunky". On the other hand, Paula Bartley, in the Women's History Review, thought that despite the problems of plagiarism "Reeves' imaginative intelligence, her economic expertise and her compassion" shone through.

== Plagiarism ==
In their review, the Financial Times reported that a spot check revealed content had been plagiarised from Wikipedia. The Guardian and other sources, identified over twenty examples of apparent plagiarism in the book, including entire paragraphs, from many different sources including newspaper obituaries, in addition to Wikipedia.

Initially, a Reeves spokesperson called the incidents "inadvertent mistakes" adding that they "strongly refute[ed] the accusation[s]" of the Financial Times. Additionally the publisher Basic Books claimed Reeves didn't intend to "present these facts as original research". Later, in an interview with BBC Radio 4's Broadcasting House, Reeves, while continuing to deny "claims of plagiarism", said that she "should have done better" and was "[taking] responsibility for everything that is in that book".
