= Our Lady's Abingdon =

Location
- Radley Road; Abingdon-on-Thames, Oxfordshire, OX14 3PS; England
- 51.67599°N 1.27626°W

Information
- Type: Private day school
- Motto: Latin: Age Quod Agis (Whatever you do, do it well)
- Religious affiliation: Roman Catholic
- Established: 1860
- Founders: Sisters of Mercy
- Closed: 11 August 2025
- Local authority: Oxfordshire
- Department for Education URN: 123298 Tables
- Head teacher: Sonia Machen
- Gender: Co-educational
- Age: 7 to 18
- Enrolment: 400~
- Website: ola.org.uk

Our Lady's Abingdon (OLA) was a Catholic, co-educational, private day school in Abingdon-on-Thames, Oxfordshire, England, for pupils aged 7–18. The school shut down in August 2025, citing "economic pressures".

== History ==
Our Lady's Convent was founded in 1860 by Sister Clare Moore of the Sisters of Mercy, who worked closely with Florence Nightingale. The school's main auditorium was named after her, the Clare Moore Auditorium, known as the CMA. The school began educating boys and girls from the local area, with a boarding school created in 1866.

The school was reconstituted independently of the Sisters of Mercy in 2004 as a registered charity and in private company limited by guarantee, formally titled Our Lady's Abingdon Trustees Limited. The Sisters left Abingdon in 2011 but maintained a representative on the board of governors.

In September 2009, the school began admitting boys into the senior school. The school name was changed to Our Lady's Abingdon to reflect the change. From the 2013–14 academic year, it was fully co-educational.

Daniel Gibbons was head from September 2021 to 2024. Sonia Machen then took over, and was head until the school closed in August 2025.

On 11 August 2025, it was announced that the school was to close with immediate effect, citing "a range of economic pressures", including "the introduction of VAT on school fees, higher National Insurance contributions, the ending of business rates relief for independent schools, and rising operational costs", as well as the fact that "affordability has become a growing concern for an increasing number of families", which "has led to a sharp decline in pupil numbers in recent months".

In June 2026, the school site was put up for sale via commercial real estate company Newmark. The price is listed as "subject to offer", with Newmark stating that there is "[p]otential for alternative uses", such as "residential, care, retirement or retail".

== Academics ==
=== A-Level ===
In 2024, 96% of students at OLA achieved at least a passing grade (grade E) in their A-Levels. Five students achieved straight A*/A grades, up from two in 2023. 2/3 of students gained at least one grade A*, grade A, or grade B.

=== GCSE ===
In 2024, 93% received at least a passing grade (grade 4) in their GCSEs. Seven pupils achieving straight 9/8/7 grades, up from two in 2023, and over half of the students gained at least one grade 8 or grade 9.

== See also ==
- List of schools in the South East of England
- List of independent schools in the United Kingdom
