= Chris Grigg =

Businessperson

Chris Grigg CBE
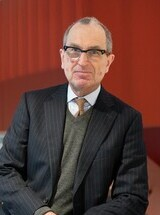
- Chris Grigg
- Born: Christopher Montague Grigg; 6 July 1959 (age 66) near Southampton, Hampshire, England
- Education: King Edward VI School, Southampton
- Alma mater: Trinity Hall, University of Cambridge
- Occupation: Businessman
- Years active: 1981–present
- Title: Chairman, Evelyn Partners
- Term: 2022–present
- Predecessor: Will Samuel
- Successor: Incumbent
- Spouse: married
- Children: 5

Christopher Montague Grigg CBE (born 6 July 1959) is a British businessman. He was formerly the chief executive of The British Land Company plc, a British property development and investment company.

== Early life ==
Grigg was educated at King Edward VI School, Southampton (where he was in Lawrence House), and graduated from Trinity Hall, University of Cambridge with a first in Economics.

== Career ==
Grigg joined Morgan Grenfell as a graduate trainee in 1981. He joined Goldman Sachs in 1985, rising to partner, before he left in 2005 to become Treasurer of Barclays Bank, and chief executive of Barclays Commercial Bank from 1 February 2007 to November 2008.

In January 2009, Grigg joined British Land as chief executive.

Although there has been some criticism of his decision to sell 50% of British Land's City of London Broadgate development to Blackstone Group, as well as 50% of the Meadowhall Centre, Sheffield, Grigg has stated his belief that this was the right decision in the long term: "We aspire to outperform the market. It's kind of hard to do that if your two largest assets have been underperformers."

In January 2012, he said that the City of London's skyline needs to become more like Manhattan to attract companies to the capital, and that office spaces need to be larger and more flexible.

In September 2020, Grigg announced he was stepping down as chief executive of British Land from December 2020.

Grigg was appointed Commander of the Order of the British Empire (CBE) in the 2021 New Year Honours for services to business, particularly during the COVID-19 response.

In April 2021, it was announced Grigg has been appointed as the chairman of the new UK Infrastructure Bank.

Grigg was a non-executive director of BAE Systems until December 2023. He is the Chairman of Evelyn Partners since February 2022 having joined as a non-executive director in August 2021.

In June 2024, he was appointed to the board of Melrose Industries and will take over the chairmanship role from October 2024.

== Personal life ==
Grigg is married and lives in Harpenden, Hertfordshire, with his wife and five children.
