= October 2024 United Kingdom budget =

- Country: United Kingdom
- Parliament: 59th
- Party: Labour Party
- Chancellor: Rachel Reeves

The October 2024 United Kingdom budget was delivered to the House of Commons by Rachel Reeves, the chancellor of the exchequer, on 30 October 2024. She is the first woman to present a UK Budget, marking the Labour Party's first Budget in over 14 years. It covered Labour's fiscal plans, with a focus on investment, healthcare, education, childcare, sustainable energy, transport, and workers' rights enrichment.

The National Minimum Wage is set to increase by 6.7% (reaching £12.21 per hour) and a £22.6 billion increase in the day-to-day health budget was announced, with a £3.1 billion increase in the capital budget. That includes £1 billion for hospital repairs and rebuilding projects. The government plans to allocate £5 billion for housing investment in the fiscal year 2025–26, with a focus on enhancing the availability of affordable housing. Education will receive £6.7 billion of capital investment, a 19% real-terms increase. This includes £1.4 billion to rebuild more than 500 schools.

== Background ==
On 22 May 2024, the then prime minister, Conservative Party leader Rishi Sunak, announced that a general election was to be held on 4 July 2024. The Labour Party launched their manifesto for the election on 13 June. The Conservative campaign focused primarily on attacks towards Labour over alleged tax plans including a disproven claim that Labour would cost households £2,000 more in tax.

Labour won a landslide victory in the election, with Keir Starmer becoming prime minister and Rachel Reeves becoming chancellor of the exchequer. On 8 July, Reeves gave her first statement as chancellor, and on 29 July she confirmed 30 October as the date for the budget. It is the first budget presented by Reeves during her tenure as Chancellor. It also is the first Labour budget since March 2010, and the first budget to be announced by a female chancellor.

=== Inherited government debt ===
The chancellor alleged that the previous government had left a 'black hole' of £22 billion. This was disputed by the official spending watchdog, the Office for Budget Responsibility (OBR), who said that the hidden costs from her predecessor Jeremy Hunt were £9.5 billion.

In response to this, the chancellor made urgent spending cuts in July 2024, including cancelling a social care cost cap in England planned for October 2025, and severe limitations to pensioner Winter Fuel Payments which received heavy criticism.

=== Social care changes ===
It was decided in September 2021 by the previous government that no-one arranging support such as going in to a care home, or paying for residential care, would have to pay more than £86,000 over their lifetime in care costs. Any individuals with personal assets of less than £20,000 would not have to pay out of from those assets, with those who had assets under £100,000 (the previous level being £23,250) being eligible for a varying degree of state support, depending on how wealthy they were. These changes came in to force in October 2023.

== Budget points ==
The main points presented were:

- The budget involved £40 billion of tax rises from 2025 and £70 billion over the next 3 years to allow more spending and investment over the next 3 years.
- It was announced 2 days before that the minimum wage is to rise by 6.7% to £12.21 an hour. This was confirmed in the budget.
- The chancellor promised to respect the OBR's forecasts and invest in the UK's economy.
- More investment in Skills England.
- Money allocated for compensation of the victims of the British Post Office scandal and the infected blood scandal.
- Setting up a probe into COVID-19 related corruption and fraud.
- Setting up a 'budget value for money board' to curb poor fiscal delivery and value for money on government projects.
- Carers will be able earn up to £10,000 without losing Carer's Allowance.
- Miners' pensions to rise by 2.5%.
- Pension credits to rise by 4.5%.
- Fuel duty frozen.
- Employees' national insurance contributions (NICs) will not rise.
- Employers' NICs will rise by 1.2% to 15% and the threshold fall from £9,100 to £5,000.
- From 2028, personal thresholds for income tax and national insurance (currently frozen) will rise in line with inflation.
- Employment allowance rises from £5,000 to £10,500.
- Capital gains tax rates increase immediately to 18% from 10% at the lower rate, and to 24% from 20% for higher earners, bringing them into line with the rates on property sales.
- The inheritance tax threshold will be frozen until 2030.
- From April 2027, pensions will be counted as part of the assets subject to inheritance tax.
- From April 2026, agricultural property will no longer be fully exempt from inheritance tax; the first £1 million will remain exempt, and tax will be charged on the excess at half the standard rate.
- A vaping tax will be introduced.
- Vehicle Excise Duty will be adjusted to favour electric vehicles.
- Air Passenger Duty will increase dependent on flight class and length.
- Retail, hospitality and leisure industry will see business rates fall in 2026.
- Alcohol duty on draught drinks will be cut by 1p.
- Corporation tax stayed at 25%.
- The non-domiciled tax regime ends in 2025.
- The small business tax multiplier will be frozen.
- Second home stamp duty rose from 3% to 5%.
- The 100% energy investment allowance and the decarbonisation relief would remain.
- Private schools' business relief will end in April 2025 and VAT would be charged on their fees from January 2025.
- Breakfast club funding will rise by 300%.
- Schools budget rises over the next four years.
- £300 million will go to further and higher education.
- Tobacco duty would rise.
- £2.5 billion more spending for defence.
- The bus fare single ticket cap rose from £2 to £3.
- £6.5 billion more spending on schools.
- £2m Jewish holocaust education fund was set up.
- Greater Manchester and West Midlands county would get further local fiscal autonomy.
- Low value shoplifting will become a crime.
- £25 million will be used to maintain closed Welsh coal mines.
- £4.5 billion to Scottish, £.1.7 billion to Welsh and £1.2 billion to the Northern Irish assemblies.
- National debt was forecast to fall by the end of the current Parliament.
- £1 billion for the UK's aviation industry.
- More and better rural broadband internet.
- £5 billion on more housing.
- £2 billion for the UK's automotive industry.
- £1.4 billion on repeating failed repair work on dilapidated and "crumbling old schools" and repairing others for the first time.
- More money for the N.W. English authority.
- More money for and tax relief for the UK's TV and movie special effects industry.
- £20 billion for UK R&D.
- Rail ticket price rises would not exceed 4.6% of current prices.
- The TransPennine Rail Upgrade would occur.
- £650 million will be given to fund local transport.
- £550 million more to be spent on road maintenance and filling in 1m road potholes.
- UK carbon capture projects would get more funding.
- More funding would be given to green hydrogen and blue hydrogen projects across the UK.
- £3.4 billion will be put in to the UK's Warm Homes Fund.
- £22.6 billion will be given to healthcare.
- 40,000 new medical appointments would be funded to help cut waiting lists to 18 weeks.
- £1.3 billion more funding for the South Yorkshire Combined Authority Leader to spend on improving and renovating Sheffield's part of the South Yorkshire Supertram.
- £3 billion in war aid to Ukraine.
- Creation of Great British Energy confirmed, to be headquartered in Aberdeen.

== Summary ==
Reeves announced tax rises worth £40 billion, the biggest tax rise at a budget since 1993. Amongst the measures she announced were an increase in employers' National Insurance to 15% on salaries above £5,000 from April 2025, income tax thresholds to rise in-line with inflation after 2028, changes to farm inheritance tax so that rural estates above the value of £1,000,000 from April 2026 would face 20 per cent inheritance tax, and a rise in the single bus fare cap to £3 from January 2025. The OBR forecast that the budget would mean the tax burden would be set to its highest ever level in recorded history. The director of the Institute for Fiscal Studies, Paul Johnson, accused Reeves of further undermining trust in politicians. Reeves later said that it was not a budget she would want to repeat, and accepted that the tax rises would likely hit wage growth for workers.

== Reactions ==
Rishi Sunak, the leader of the Conservative Party, accused the government of deceit and breaking earlier fiscal pledges. He disputed Reeves's description of a "black hole" in the budget, stating that Labour had always planned to raise taxes, and condemned the previous Labour government's record. The response prompted Victoria Atkins, in a moment of quiet to exclaim "He's wiped the floor with Rachel".

Sir Ed Davey, the leader of the Liberal Democrats, described the government’s plans on social care as “a good start” but inadequate. He also said that he thought that the budget may not offer British people "a sense of hope, urgency and the promise of a fair deal" and that more could have been done to help the more vulnerable people in society.

The OBR supported it and predicted 1.1% of economic growth for the next fiscal year, starting in April 2025.

The director of the Institute for Fiscal Studies, Paul Johnson, accused Reeves of further undermining trust in politicians.

Businessman James Dyson, the founder of the Dyson company, and one of the UK's richest industrialists, said of the budget that by targeting family-owned businesses, Reeves had inflicted "an egregious act of self harm" on the economy. He said that the effect on family businesses of the changes to inheritance tax and the National Insurance increases will be to "kill entrepreneurship, snuff out wealth creation and stunt growth".

== Subsequent events ==
On 31 October, the Independent Schools Council, which represents around 1,400 private schools in the UK, voted to take legal action challenging the government's decision to end their tax exemption status from January 2025.

The Office for Budget Responsibility cut its March estimates for public sector net financial liabilities (PSNFL) from £62 billion to £44 billion on 2 November.

In a letter to Reeves, published on 19 November, a group of the UK's high street retailers, including Tesco and Greggs, warned the "cumulative burden" of tax rises announced in the budget, along with other policies already in the pipeline, would add billions in costs to the retail sector and put jobs at risk.

Also on 19 November, several thousand people attended a protest in London over inheritance tax increases for farmers. It was reported that a 78-year-old farmer had taken his own life the day before the budget, fearing tax increases.

On 4 December, the Organisation for Economic Co-operation and Development (OECD) forecast that UK interest rates would fall less quickly over the next two years because of the measures outlined in the budget.
