= Nicholas Joicey =

British civil servant (born 1970)

Nicholas Joicey CB
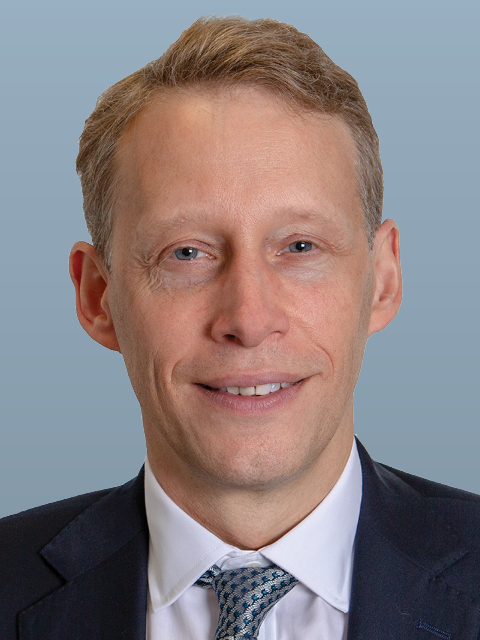
- Born: Nicholas Beverley Joicey; 11 May 1970 (age 56); Guisborough, North Yorkshire, England
- Education: Wintringham School; University of Bristol (BA); Peterhouse, Cambridge (PhD)
- Spouse: Rachel Reeves
- Children: 2

Academic background
- Thesis: The intellectual, political and cultural significance of Penguin books 1935–c. 1956 (1995)

Nicholas Beverley Joicey CB (born 11 May 1970) is Second Permanent Secretary and Group Chief Operating Officer at the Department for Environment, Food and Rural Affairs. He was briefly Director General of the Cabinet Office's Economic and Domestic Secretariat, having previously been Director General for Finance at the Department for Work and Pensions, and before that, Director General for Strategy, International and Finance at the Department for Environment, Food and Rural Affairs. He previously worked as private secretary and speech writer to United Kingdom Chancellor Gordon Brown, as a journalist at The Observer newspaper and as director of the International Department at HM Treasury.

== Early life ==
Joicey was born in Guisborough in North Yorkshire, to Harold Beverley and Wendy Joicey. He was educated at Wintringham School, Grimsby. He studied for an undergraduate degree in history at the University of Bristol and then completed a PhD degree, also in history, at Peterhouse, Cambridge, in 1995.

== Career ==
From 1995 to 1996, Joicey worked at The Observer newspaper. He then moved to the Treasury, working as Private Secretary and Speech writer to Chancellor of the Exchequer, Gordon Brown between 1999 and 2001. Joicey was part of a United Kingdom delegation to the International Monetary Fund and World Bank in Washington from 2001 to 2003, heading the EU policy team from 2004 to 2006. He was Director for International Finance at HM Treasury, before joining the Department for Environment, Food and Rural Affairs in January 2014 as Director General for Strategy, International and Biosecurity. Joicey was appointed Department for Work and Pensions Finance Director General in July 2018.

He then served as Director General of the Cabinet Office's Economic and Domestic Secretariat, before being appointed to his current position of Chief Operating Officer and Second Permanent Secretary at the Department for Environment, Food and Rural Affairs in 2023. In 2024, his salary was between £170,000–£174,999. Between July and December 2024 he was on a leave of absence. In January 2025 he was placed on a one-year secondment from the civil service, as interim chief operating officer at the Blavatnik School of Government, University of Oxford.

Joicey was appointed Companion of the Order of the Bath (CB) in the 2019 Birthday Honours for services to the environment.

== Personal life ==
Joicey is married to Rachel Reeves, the Labour Party MP and former Chancellor of the Exchequer. His interests include modern history and film and he is a trustee of the Cambridge Film Trust.
