= Chancellorship of Rachel Reeves =

Rachel Reeves' tenure at HM Treasury (2024–2026)

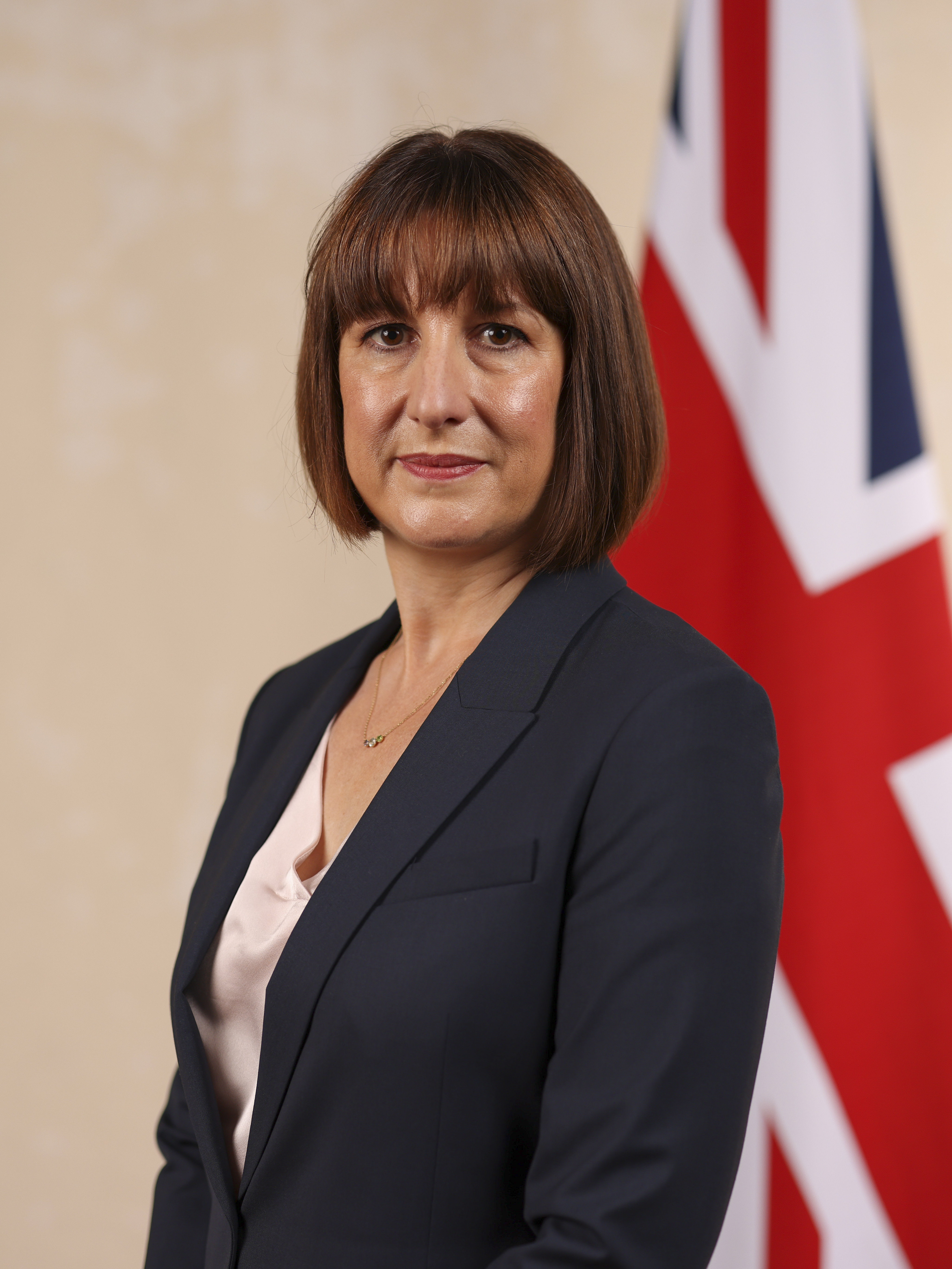
- Official portrait, 2024
- Chancellorship of Rachel Reeves; 5 July 2024 – 20 July 2026
- Chancellor: Rachel Reeves
- Party: Labour
- Election: 2024
- Nominated by: Keir Starmer
- Appointed by: Charles III
- Seat: 11 Downing Street

Rachel Reeves became Chancellor of the Exchequer on 5 July 2024, upon her appointment by Prime Minister Keir Starmer, following Labour's victory in the 2024 general election. She succeeded Conservative chancellor Jeremy Hunt, and became the first woman to hold the office of Chancellor in its 708-year history. Reeves received poor satisfaction ratings in polls while Chancellor.

In this role Reeves adhered to "modern supply-side economics", an economic policy that focuses on infrastructure, education and labour supply by rejecting tax cuts and deregulation. It was heavily inspired by Joe Biden's economic policy, particularly his Inflation Reduction Act. She coined the term securonomics in 2023 to refer to her version of this economic policy. Early into her tenure, Reeves established the National Wealth Fund, scrapped certain winter fuel payments, cancelled several infrastructure projects, and announced numerous public sector pay rises. She presented her first budget in October 2024, where she introduced the largest tax rises at a budget since March 1993. She presented her second budget in November 2025, where she introduced further tax rises.

Reeves was sacked from the role on 20 July 2026, when Starmer was succeeded by Andy Burnham. She reportedly turned down another "big job" in the Burnham government and instead chose to return to the backbenches.

== Background ==
Rachel Reeves was appointed Shadow Chancellor in May 2021, following a shadow cabinet reshuffle. Over her three years in office, Reeves proposed to scrap tuition fees, no re-introduction in a cap on bankers' bonuses, and a plan to nationalise the railways.

=== Securonomics ===
Since 2022, Reeves has adhered to "modern supply-side economics", an economic policy which focuses on infrastructure, education and labour supply by rejecting tax cuts and deregulation. In May 2023, Reeves coined the term "securonomics" to refer to her version of this economic policy, originally in a public address at the Peterson Institute for International Economics. It is heavily inspired by US president Joe Biden's economic policy, particularly his Inflation Reduction Act.

Securonomics is based on the belief that globalisation has failed to achieve its stated aims and that economies in the Western world must adapt in response. It would involve a productivist "active state" taking a more active role in managing the free-market economy, boosting production and drawing up industrial policy, stronger supply chains, and more economic cooperation with international allies with similar economic goals. Reeves believes that the active state is part of an "emerging global consensus" led by Biden's administration which will replace the neoliberal economic consensus, and that economic policy must be driven by the need for security.

In an interview with the Financial Times in May 2023, Reeves said securonomics had to be based on "the rock of fiscal responsibility". She said her proposed £28 billion climate investment plan, Labour's version of the Inflation Reduction Act, had to "fit within her fiscal rules". In June 2023, the investment plan was revised to a gradual roll-out where the annual investment would rise gradually to £28 billion by around 2027. She argued that following the economic impact of the 2021–2023 global energy crisis, food price crisis and the Truss government's "mini-budget", the plan "will only be possible if we have an iron grip on public spending and tax receipts". The New Statesman reported that in an interview Reeves said "a Labour government would not introduce annual wealth and land taxes; raise income tax; equalise capital gains rates and income tax; rejoin the European single market and customs union; change the Bank of England's inflation target and reform its rigid mandate; or take private utilities into public ownership, except for the railways".

== Tenure ==
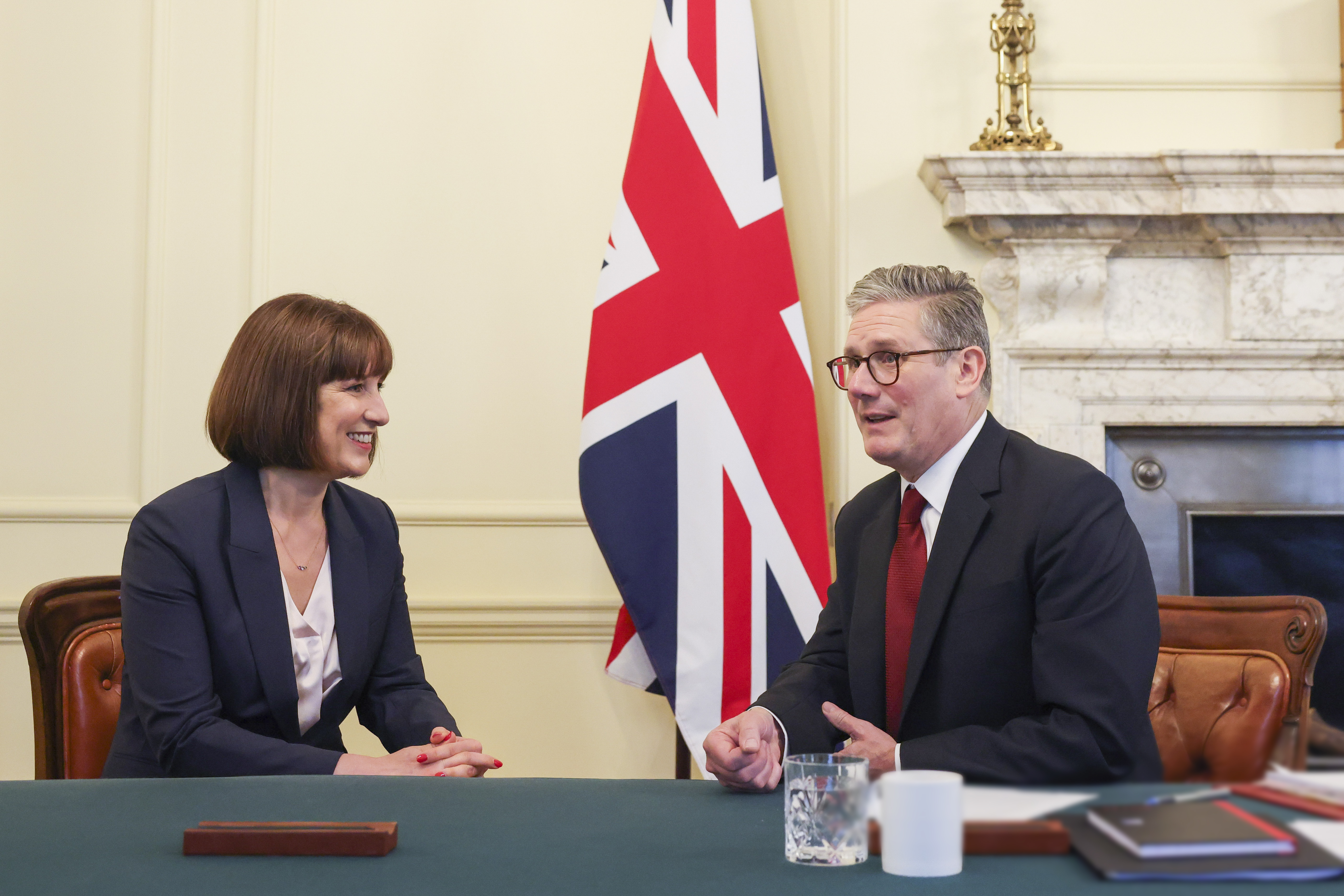
Reeves appointed as Chancellor of the Exchequer by Keir Starmer, 5 July 2024

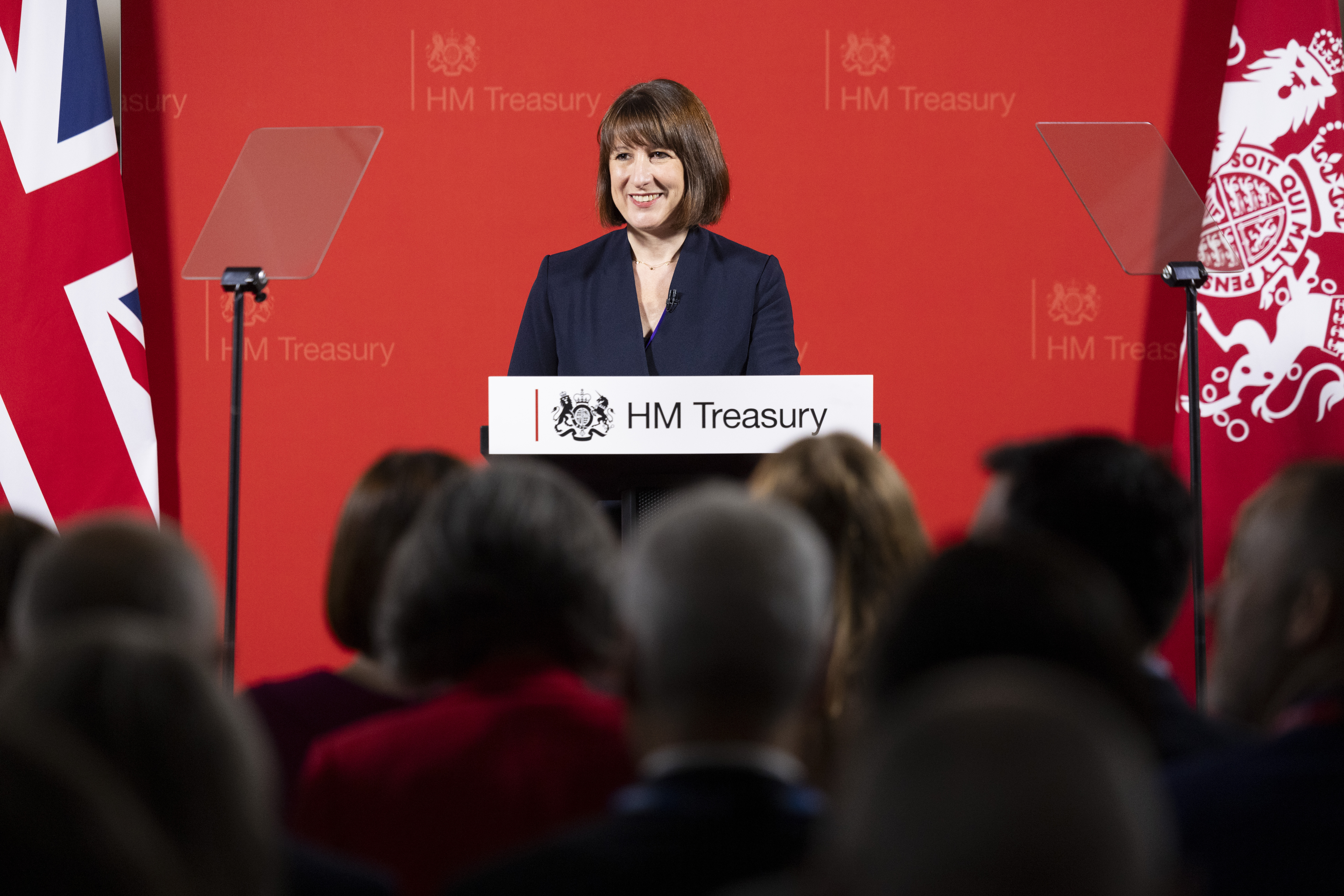
Reeves delivers her first speech, July 2024.

Reeves was appointed Chancellor of the Exchequer by Prime Minister Keir Starmer on 5 July. She became the first woman to hold the office of Chancellor in its 708-year history. On taking office Reeves has said that since there is "not a huge amount of money" the focus will be on unlocking private-sector investment, as she believes "private-sector investment is the lifeblood of a successful economy." She made her first statement as Chancellor two days later, announcing measures to grow the economy. Reeves also announced her first budget would be released later in the year in the autumn.

It is such an honour to be here today as the Chancellor of the Exchequer. I know that responsibility that brings to guide our economy through uncertain times, to restore stability in an age of insecurity, to build prosperity that draws on the talents of working people. To every young woman and girl.... to every young woman and girl watching this: let today show that there should be no ceilings on your ambitions, your hopes or your dreams.

— Rachel Reeves' statement to HM Treasury, July 2024

In July 2024, Reeves announced a new £7.3bn National Wealth Fund to decarbonise Britain's heavy industry, which would be disbursed by the UK Infrastructure Bank over five years.

=== 2024 Spending Review ===
On 29 July 2024, Reeves conducted a spending review, arguing there was a need to make "necessary and urgent decisions" because of an "unfunded" and "undisclosed" overspending of £21.9bn by the previous Conservative government. Among the decisions she made were to axe Winter Fuel Payments for about 10 million pensioners not receiving pension credit, cancellation of several infrastructure projects and selling surplus public sector buildings and land. Shadow Chancellor Jeremy Hunt dismissed her claims as "spurious", and argued that details of all government spending had been released by the Office for Budget Responsibility. During a subsequent appearance on Sky News, Reeves accused Hunt of "knowingly and deliberately" lying about the state of public services during the election campaign. In response, Hunt wrote to Cabinet secretary Simon Case, who heads the civil service, to dispute Labour's claims and request an "immediate answer" to "conflicting claims" that risk "bringing the civil service into disrepute".

In a bid to halt strike action, the government offered junior doctors in England a two-year pay deal worth 22% on average. Reeves scrapped the previous government's plan to sell shares to the general public in NatWest Group, but stated that the government still intended to fully dispose of its shareholding by 2025–26.

=== Alleged contravention of the ministerial code ===
The speaker of the House of Commons, Lindsay Hoyle, reprimanded Reeves in the Commons on 28 October 2024, saying he was "very, very disappointed" and found it totally unacceptable that she had given information to journalists in the US about the upcoming Budget, in contravention of the ministerial code. The code expects major government announcements to be made in the Commons before to the news media. Hoyle said the early revelations were a "supreme discourtesy to the House".

=== October 2024 budget ===
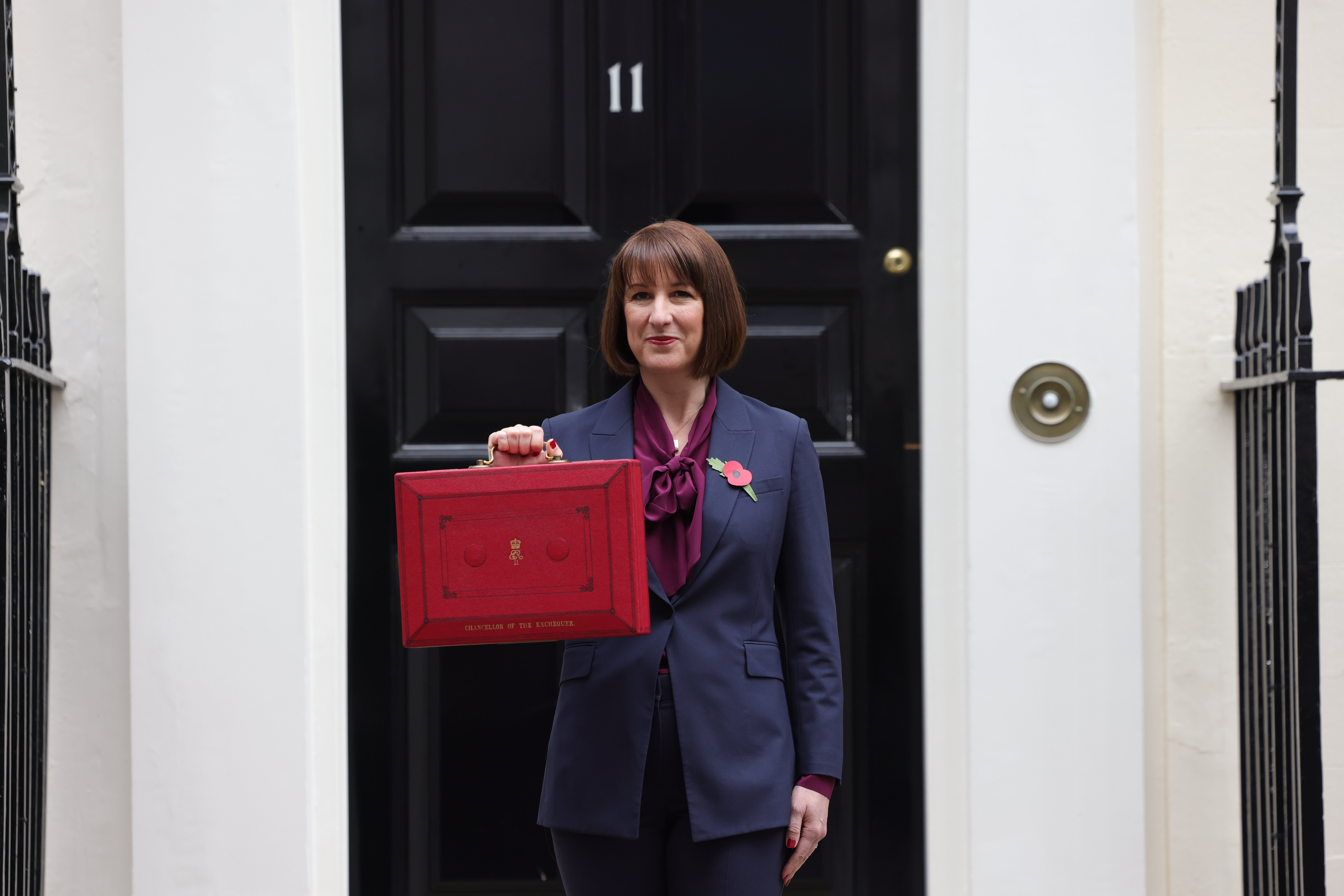
Reeves holding the red box

The October 2024 United Kingdom budget was presented to the House of Commons by Reeves on 30 October 2024. In the budget, she announced tax rises worth £40 billion, the biggest tax rise at a budget since 1993. Amongst the measures she announced were an increase in employers' National Insurance to 15% on salaries above £5,000 from April 2025, income tax thresholds to rise in-line with inflation after 2028, changes to farm inheritance tax meaning that the inheritance tax of 20% would effectively apply to rural estates above the value of £1,000,000 from April 2026, and a rise in the single bus fare cap to £3 from January 2025. The OBR forecast that the budget would mean the tax burden would be set to its highest ever level in recorded history. The director of the Institute for Fiscal Studies, Paul Johnson, accused Reeves of further undermining trust in politicians. Reeves later said that it was not a budget she would want to repeat, and accepted that the tax rises would likely hit wage growth for workers.

Rishi Sunak accused the government of deceit and breaking earlier fiscal pledges. He disputed Reeves' description of a "black hole" in the budget, stating that Labour had always planned to raise taxes, and condemned the previous Labour government's record. Ed Davey described the government’s plans on social care as “a good start” but inadequate. He also said that he thought that the budget may not offer British people "a sense of hope, urgency and the promise of a fair deal" and that more could have been done to help the more vulnerable people in society.

In a letter to Reeves, published on 19 November, a group of the UK's high street retailers, including Tesco and Greggs, warned the "cumulative burden" of tax rises announced in the budget, along with other policies already in the pipeline, would add billions in costs to the retail sector and put jobs at risk. Also on 19 November, several thousand people attended a protest in London over inheritance tax increases for farmers.

=== November 2025 budget ===
The November 2025 budget was leaked 40 minutes before Reeves' official announcement by the Office for Budget Responsibility. In her address to the House of Commons, she announced a tax rise of £26 billion, nearly 1/3 of which will come from a personal tax threshold freeze. Some of the largest changes are in wages and benefits with the aim to address rising poverty concerns. The two-child benefit cap is to be scrapped in April, and the Legal minimum wage for over-21s to rise 4.1% in April, from £12.21 to £12.71 per hour, with the wage for 18 to 20-year-olds rising from £10 to £10.85.

The budget was received poorly, with polls indicating that 59% of people thinking she is doing a bad job. In addition to calls from opposition Kemi Badenoch, the Conservative leader, saying that she thought the chancellor should resign.

== Public opinion ==
Reeves proved unpopular with the British public. Her approval ratings have seen a notable decline from late 2024 through the end of 2025. Her unfavorable rating rose 12 points to 37% by August 2024, primarily driven by negative impressions among non-Labour voters. This downward trend accelerated throughout 2025. By December, following her second budget, her net favourability plummeted to -59, with 71% of Britons viewing her unfavourably—the lowest recorded for any chancellor in the nine-year history of their tracker. Sentiment among her own base also shifted significantly; while Labour voters were divided at the start of 2024, by late 2025, 56% viewed her negatively compared to 27% favourably. While Reeves remained focused on her fiscal rules to stabilize the economy, public criticism continued to center on tax increases and economic performance.

== Official portrait ==
A portrait of Reeves was unveiled in 2026. Reeves was the first woman to serve as Chancellor of the Exchequer. It was painted by Sally Ward in oil on canvas. It was commissioned by the Parliamentary Art Collection.

Writing for Accountancy Daily, Sara White described the portrait as depicting Reeves in a "determined mood" as she prepared to deliver the October 2024 United Kingdom budget. White wrote that Reeves's budget folder is "brimming with tax proposals" and she was "looking most determined with that steely demeanor so reminiscent of her early days in the post". Ward painted the portrait from a photograph of Reeves in her study at HM Treasury by Simon Dawson. The cost of the painting was £3,000; it was funded by the Speaker's Advisory Committee on Works of Art. Reeves said of the painting that when she stood at the dispatch box to deliver the first budget by a woman she was "acutely aware of the generations of women who had fought to make that moment possible" and that she hoped the portrait "serves as a reminder to every young woman and girl across the country that there should be no ceiling on their ambition". Ward described the work as "both a portrait and a history painting, capturing a decisive moment in British political and parliamentary life".

It was unveiled in March 2026 at an event celebrating Women's History Month and the 170th anniversary of the Society of Women Artists (SWA). It was displayed at the SWA's summer exhibition at the Mall Galleries in late June.

== End of tenure ==
On 20 July 2026, Reeves tenure as Chancellor ended as Andy Burnham took office and appointed a new cabinet. She reportedly turned down another "big job" in the Burnham government and instead chose to return to the backbenches.
