= Taxation of private school fees in the United Kingdom =

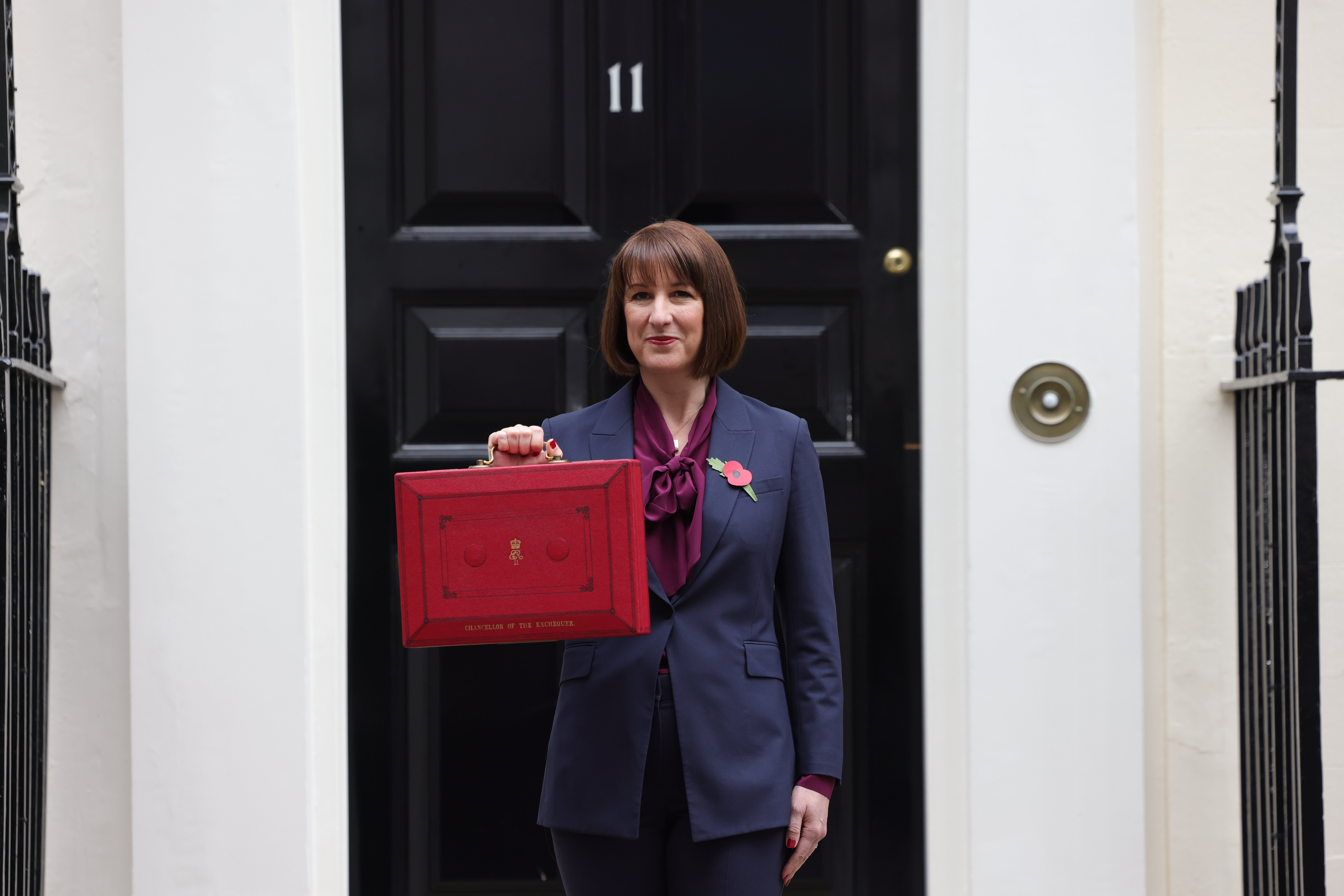
Rachel Reeves announced the introduction of VAT in the October 2024 United Kingdom budget.

In the October 2024 United Kingdom budget, the new Labour government confirmed previously announced plans to apply VAT to private school fees from 1 January 2025 and to end charitable rate relief for private schools from April 2025.

== Background ==
As of January 2024, there were 2,421 private schools in England in total, a small increase from 2,408 in January 2023. There were a further 90 independent schools in Scotland (October 2024), 83 in Wales (September 2024), and 14 in Northern Ireland (October 2023).

At the time of the introduction of Value-added tax in the United Kingdom (VAT) in 1973, the fees of private schools were given an exemption, echoing the previous exemption from paying Purchase Tax. At the 2024 United Kingdom general election, the Labour Party campaigned on a policy of removing this exemption. Labour had put forward the same policy in its 2017 and 2019 general election manifestos, pledging to use the extra revenue to fund free primary school meals and broader support for all children.

== Implementation ==
On 30 October 2024, Chancellor Rachel Reeves delivered the Autumn Budget, confirming plans to apply VAT to private school fees from 1 January 2025 and to end charitable rate relief for private schools from April 2025. This was put into law by a Finance Act, and all school fees for education and charges for boarding services in the United Kingdom have since been charged at the standard 20 per cent rate of VAT.

The Policy objective was stated as:

The government is removing the VAT exemption for education and boarding services provided by private schools in order to raise revenue to support the public finances and help deliver the government’s commitments relating to education and young people, including the 94% of school children who attend state schools.

The tax was also applied to school fees which had been pre-paid on or after 29 July 2024 for terms after 1 January 2025.

== Failed legal challenge ==
The Independent Schools Council and others, who argued that the taxation "impeded access to education at independent schools" and was therefore incompatible with the human rights to education and to freedom from discrimination required by the European Convention on Human Rights (ECHR), launched a legal challenge in the High Court of Justice. On 13 June 2025, the judgement of the court, given by Dame Victoria Sharp, president of the King's Bench Division, Lord Justice Newey, and Mr Justice Chamberlain, was that there was no breach of human rights, as the ECHR did not protect a right to pay school fees at a particular level. The judgement took into account a government admission that the policy would mean some families would not be able to afford the higher fees and that an estimated hundred schools would close by 2028. It found that these matters touched on the right to education, but that they should seen in the context that public services, including state schools, would benefit from higher revenue.

== See also ==
- European Union value added tax § Exemptions
