= Rachel Reeves =

British politician (born 1979)

The Right Honourable Rachel Reeves MP
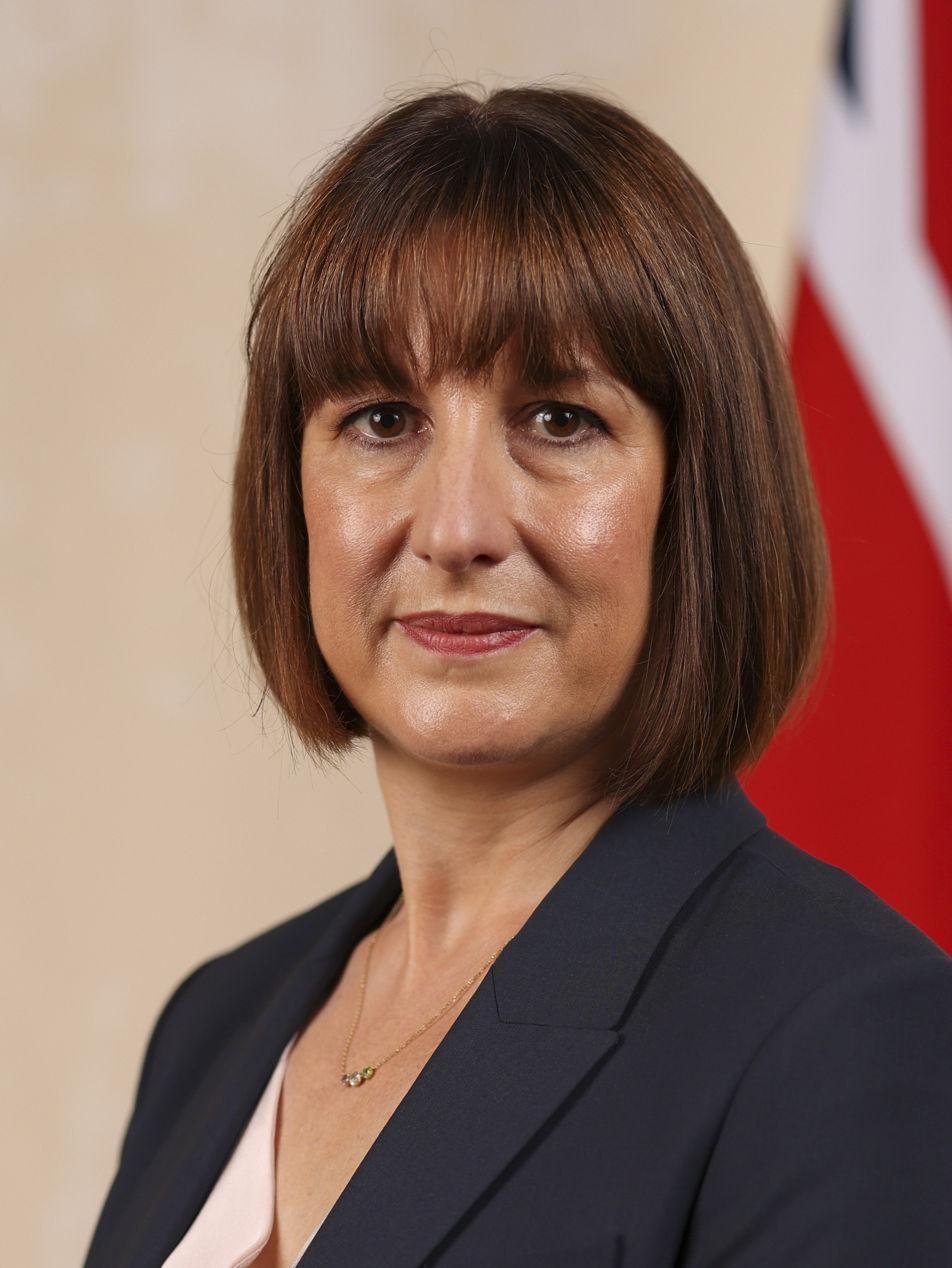
- Official portrait, 2024

Chancellor of the Exchequer
- In office 5 July 2024 – 20 July 2026
- Prime Minister: Keir Starmer
- Preceded by: Jeremy Hunt
- Succeeded by: John Healey

Chair of the Business, Energy and Industrial Strategy Committee
- In office 12 July 2017 – 7 April 2020
- Preceded by: Iain Wright
- Succeeded by: Darren Jones
Shadow portfolios
| 2021–2024 | Chancellor of the Exchequer |
| 2020–2021 | Duchy of Lancaster; Cabinet Office |
| 2013–2015 | Work and Pensions |
| 2011–2013 | Chief Secretary to the Treasury |

Member of Parliament of the United Kingdom
- Incumbent
- Assumed office 6 May 2010
- Preceded by: John Battle
- Constituency: Leeds West (2010–2024); Leeds West and Pudsey (2024–present)
- Majority: 12,392 (32.2%)

Personal details
- Born: Rachel Jane Reeves; 13 February 1979 (age 47) Lewisham, London, England
- Party: Labour
- Spouse: Nicholas Joicey
- Children: 2
- Relatives: Ellie Reeves (sister)
- Education: New College, Oxford (BA); London School of Economics (MSc)
- Website: rachelreeves.com
- Rachel Reeves' voice Reeves outlining 'modern supply-side economics' in 2022

Rachel Jane Reeves (born 13 February 1979) is a British politician who served as Chancellor of the Exchequer from 2024 to 2026. A member of the Labour Party, she has been Member of Parliament (MP) for Leeds West and Pudsey, formerly Leeds West, since 2010. She held various shadow ministerial and shadow cabinet portfolios between 2010 and 2015 and from 2020 until Labour entered government following its victory in the 2024 election.

Born in Lewisham, Reeves attended Cator Park School for Girls. She studied PPE at the University of Oxford before obtaining a master's degree in economics from the London School of Economics. She joined the Labour Party at the age of sixteen, and later worked in the Bank of England. After two unsuccessful attempts to be elected to the House of Commons, she was elected as the MP for the seat of Leeds West at the 2010 general election. She endorsed Ed Miliband in the 2010 Labour leadership election and joined his frontbench in October 2010 as Shadow Pensions Minister. She was promoted to the shadow cabinet as Shadow Chief Secretary to the Treasury in 2011, and later became Shadow Secretary of State for Work and Pensions in 2013. She was reelected to Parliament at the 2015 general election, and following Jeremy Corbyn's election as Labour leader the same year, she left the shadow cabinet and returned to the backbenches.

On the backbenches, she served as chair of the Business, Energy and Industrial Strategy Committee from 2017 to 2020. She was reelected in both the 2017 and 2019 general elections. In 2020 she returned to the shadow cabinet as Shadow Chancellor of the Duchy of Lancaster under new leader Keir Starmer. In the May 2021 British shadow cabinet reshuffle, she was promoted to Shadow Chancellor of the Exchequer. As Shadow Chancellor, Reeves campaigned on a platform that advocated modern supply-side economics, an economic policy that focuses on improving economic growth by boosting labour supply and raising productivity, while reducing inequality and environmental damage. She proposed a plan to nationalise the railways.

Following Labour's victory in the 2024 general election and the subsequent formation of the Starmer ministry, Reeves was appointed to the government as Chancellor of the Exchequer, becoming the first woman to hold the office in its over 800-year history. Early into her tenure, she established the National Wealth Fund, scrapped certain winter fuel payments, cancelled several infrastructure projects, and announced numerous public sector pay rises. She presented her first budget in October 2024, where she introduced the largest tax rises at a budget since March 1993. She presented her second budget in November 2025, where she introduced further tax rises and saw her popularity ratings fall to the lowest recorded for a Chancellor. After the resignation of Starmer, Reeves was dismissed by Andy Burnham and returned to the backbenches in July 2026 and was succeeded by John Healey as Chancellor.

== Early life and education ==
Rachel Jane Reeves was born on 13 February 1979 in Lewisham, London, England. Her parents worked as primary school teachers, were very focused on education, and divorced when Reeves was seven. Reeves cites the influence of her father on her social-democratic politics and those of her sister Ellie Reeves, also a Labour politician. She recalls how, when she was eight years old, her father, Graham, pointed out the then Labour Party leader Neil Kinnock on the television and "told us that was who we voted for". Reeves says she and her sister have "both known we were Labour since then". She joined the Labour Party at the age of sixteen.

She was educated at a comprehensive school, the Cator Park School for Girls in Beckenham. Reeves attained four grade As at A-level, in mathematics, further mathematics, economics and politics, she campaigned for Labour in the 1997 general election. Reeves studied philosophy, politics and economics at the University of Oxford, where she was an undergraduate student at New College, achieving a 2:1 Bachelor of Arts degree in June 2000. From 2003 to 2004, she studied for a master's degree in economics at the London School of Economics (LSE), graduating with a merit.

== Early career ==
=== Bank of England ===
Reeves joined the Bank of England in September 2000 as part of their two-year graduate scheme. From 2003 to 2004 she studied at the London School of Economics and from 2004 to 2006 she was on a secondment in Washington. It is unclear how long she was a dedicated full time Economist given the two secondments. In a 2021 interview with Stylist magazine, Reeves said she had spent a decade working as an economist at the Bank of England, however her LinkedIn CV listed six years at the Bank, from September 2000 to December 2006,years she was pursuing a master's degree at the LSE whilst 200. In February 2025, BBC News reported that Reeves' LinkedIn CV had also been incorrect, and that she had left the Bank of England by March 2006.

=== HBOS ===
In 2006, Reeves moved to Leeds to work for the retail arm of HBOS. In 2024, due to criticism of Reeves saying she had worked as an economist at HBOS, her LinkedIn CV was changed, and her role at the bank was updated to "Retail Banking". The Times reported her actual role was "running a customer relations department dealing with complaints and mortgage retention". In February 2025, the BBC reported allegations that while at HBOS, there was an expenses investigation into Reeves and two other senior managers over whistleblower concerns in early 2009 that three managers were using the bank's money to "fund a lifestyle", with alleged inappropriate spending on dinners, events, taxis and gifts, including for each other. The BBC found that the initial part of this investigation, undertaken by Internal Audit, found that the three managers appeared to have broken the rules, and that the whistleblower's allegations were substantiated, although the BBC was unable to determine the outcome of the investigation, or whether it was concluded. The BBC also reported that Reeves' LinkedIn CV contained an incorrect date of departure from HBOS, and that she had left the bank via voluntary redundancy in May 2009, rather than in December 2009 as previously said.

== Parliamentary career ==
=== Initial candidatures ===
Reeves stood as the Labour Party parliamentary candidate in the Conservative safe seat of Bromley and Chislehurst at the 2005 general election, finishing second behind the sitting Conservative MP Eric Forth. Following Forth's death in 2006, she also contested the 2006 by-election, and finished in fourth place. Labour support fell from 10,241 votes to 1,925, in what was described as a "humiliation" for Labour.

Reeves sought nomination for the Leeds West seat at the 2010 general election, seeking to replace John Battle, who had chosen to retire. Reeves was selected to contest the seat from an all-women shortlist of Labour Party prospective parliamentary candidates. She was elected on 6 May 2010 with a majority of 7,016.

=== Backbench ===
In her maiden speech, delivered on 8 June 2010, Reeves praised the work of Battle and committed to continue fighting for justice for the victims of the Armley asbestos disaster and their families.

It is a huge privilege to have been elected as the Member of Parliament for Leeds West and to succeed John Battle, who represented us here for 23 years. John showed us that politics can make a difference and that the right values and policies can transform people's lives. Today more than ever, we need the ambition for justice, equality and fairness that drove John. It is a real honour to serve as the Member of Parliament for Leeds West and, in doing my duty to my constituents, I will act with the hopes, dreams and aspirations of Leeds West as my guide.

— Rachel Reeves in her maiden speech to the House of Commons, June 2010

In a series of questions in Parliament, she enquired whether the government would honour promises by the previous government to compensate victims of asbestos diagnosed with pleural plaques, and bring legislation into force making it easier to pursue claims against insurers. A mentor for Reeves was Alistair Darling, who gave her advice on economic policy.

=== Frontbench and initial shadow cabinet positions ===
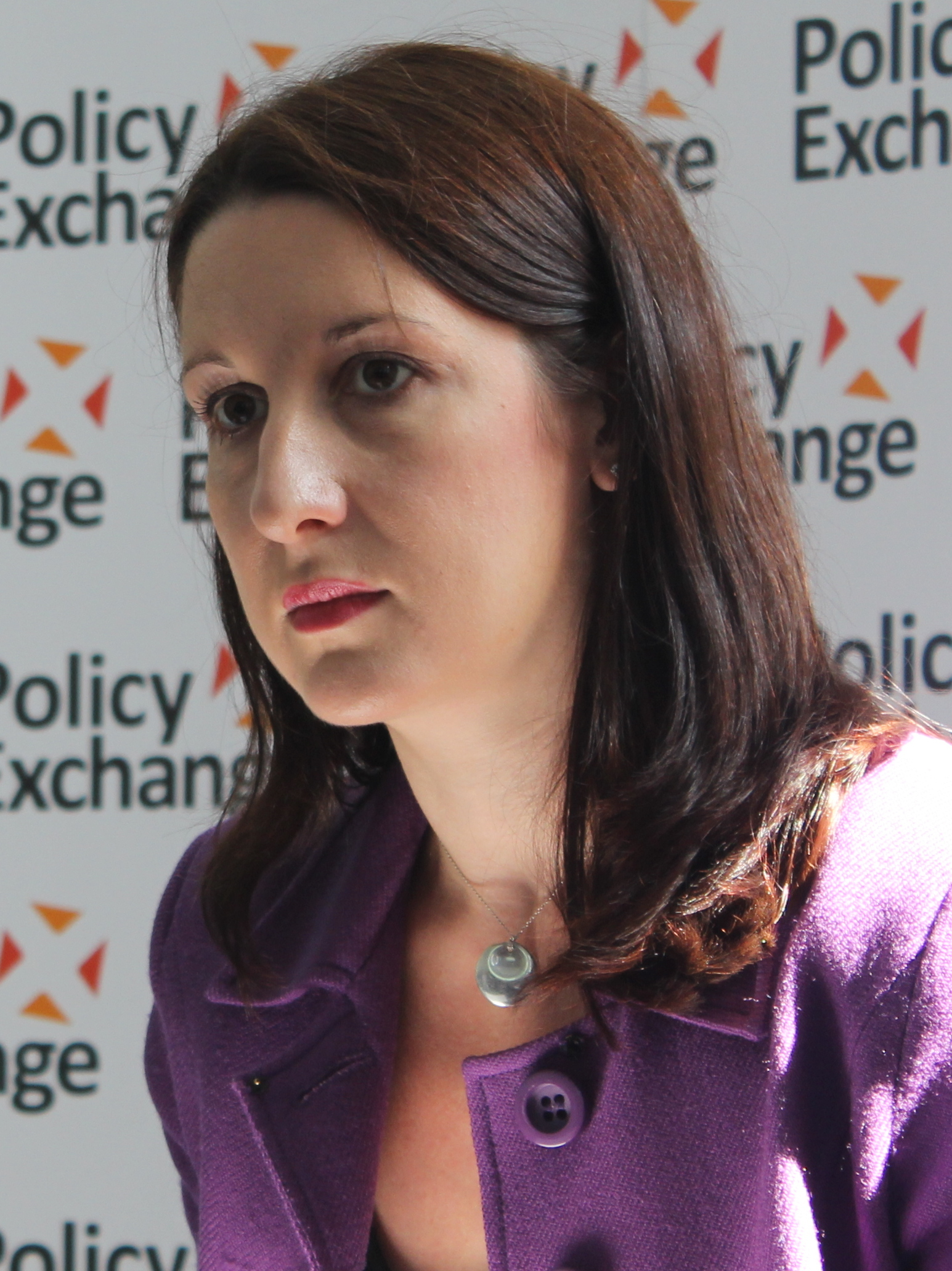
Reeves in 2012

Following the formation of the Conservative-Liberal Democrat coalition government after the 2010 election, Reeves supported Ed Miliband for the Labour leadership because she felt he was the candidate most willing to listen to what the voters were saying about where the party went wrong. After becoming an MP, Reeves was appointed to the Department for Business, Innovation and Skills Select Committee then as Shadow Pensions Minister in October 2010. In her role as Shadow Pensions Minister in Miliband's shadow cabinet, she campaigned against the Government's proposed acceleration of equalising state pension ages for men and women. She was promoted to the post of Shadow Chief Secretary to the Treasury in October 2011.

Appointed Shadow Secretary of State for Work and Pensions in 2013, Reeves proposed that anyone unemployed for two years, or one year if under 25 years old, would be required to take a guaranteed job or lose access to benefits. This caused controversy within the Labour Party, and Reeves also stated that Labour would be "tougher" than the Conservative Party in cutting the benefits bill. She caused further controversy in early 2015 by stating "We [Labour] don't want to be seen as, and we're not, the party to represent those who are out of work". Reeves was re-elected at the 2015 general election with an increased vote share of 48.0% and an increased majority of 10,727.

=== Return to the backbenches ===
Following Jeremy Corbyn's election as leader in 2015, Reeves did not serve in his shadow cabinet and returned to the backbenches. She supported Owen Smith in the 2016 Labour leadership election following mass resignations in protest of Corbyn's leadership amid the 2016 European Union membership referendum, but Corbyn was re-elected as leader and Reeves remained on the backbenches for the remainder of his leadership. Reeves was a close friend of Jo Cox. Following her murder in 2016, Reeves paid tribute to her in the house of Commons, ending the tribute by saying "Batley and Spen will go on to elect a new MP, but no-one can replace a mother". The moment Reeves finished, she broke down in tears.

In September 2016, Reeves described her constituency as being "like a tinderbox" that could explode if immigration was not curbed. At the snap 2017 general election, Reeves was again re-elected with an increased vote share of 63.9% and an increased majority of 15,965. She was again re-elected at the 2019 general election, this time with a decreased vote share of 55.1% and a decreased majority of 10,564. On 12 July 2017, Reeves was elected chair of the Business, Energy and Industrial Strategy Committee, and was reelected in January 2020, serving until her return to the frontbench in April 2020.

=== Starmer shadow cabinet ===
When Keir Starmer succeeded Corbyn as Labour leader in 2020 after winning the party leadership election, Reeves was appointed as Shadow Chancellor of the Duchy of Lancaster, with responsibility for Labour's response to Brexit and shadowing Michael Gove.

==== Shadow Chancellor of the Exchequer ====
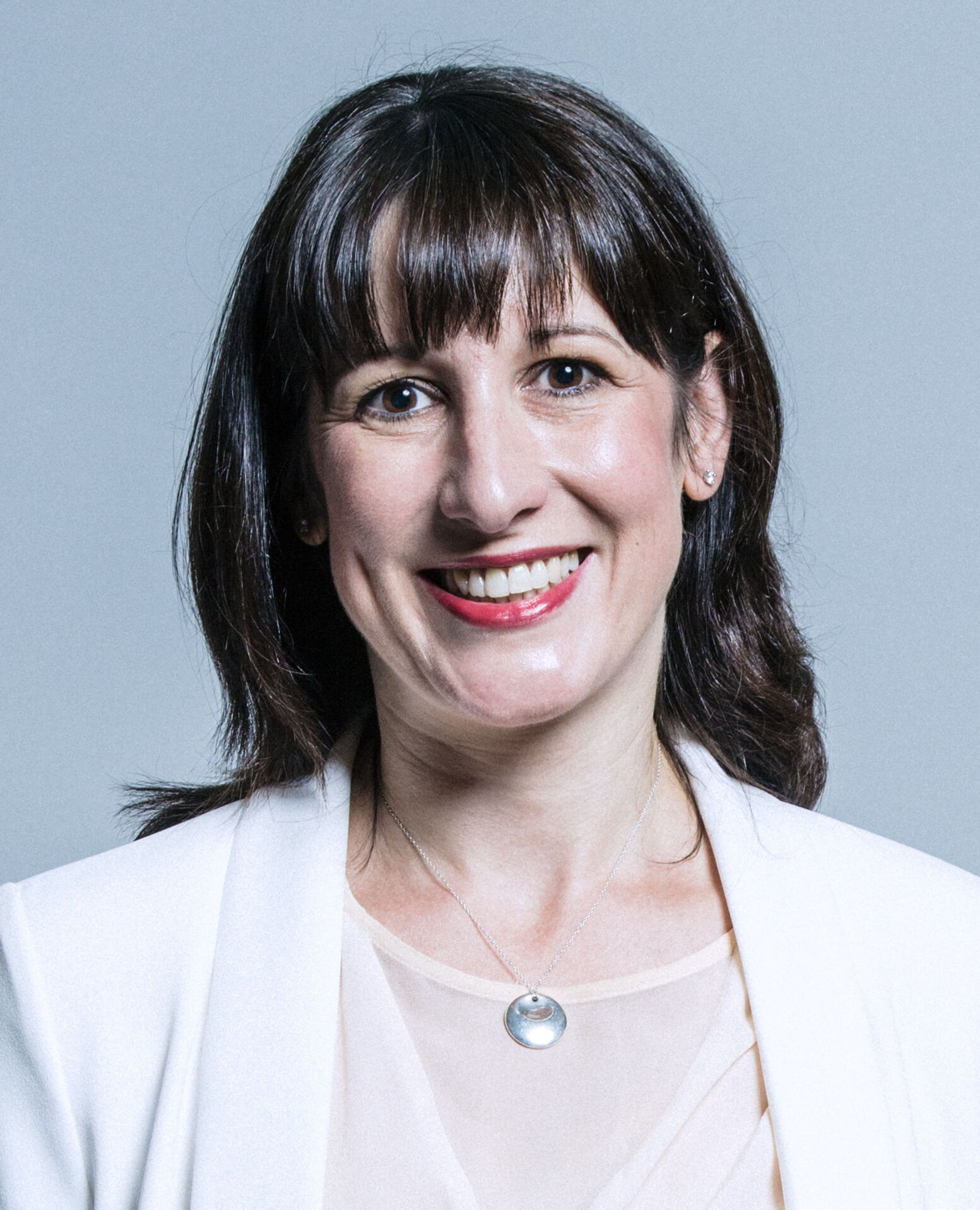
Official MP portrait, 2017

Reeves moved into the role of Shadow Chancellor of the Exchequer in a shadow cabinet reshuffle on 9 May 2021, replacing Anneliese Dodds. As Shadow Chancellor, Reeves opposed aspects of the budgets presented by Rishi Sunak, Kwasi Kwarteng and Jeremy Hunt. Reeves strongly criticised Kwasi Kwarteng's September 2022 mini-budget, describing it as "casino economics". In December 2021, Reeves said she would support a 2p cut to the Income Tax basic rate, if the Conservatives proposed that. She opposed the planned 1.2% rise in National Insurance rates. Reeves said Labour planned to replace business rates with a new system that charged shops fairly compared to larger online businesses.

In an interview with the Financial Times, outlining her forthcoming speech in Bury on strengthening the economy, Reeves said a Starmer government would be pro-business and committed to fiscal discipline. She said Britain had seen Japanese-style Lost Decades of growth, which she said the Labour government would reverse through following fiscal rules and eliminating borrowing for day-to-day spending, with no unfunded election spending commitments. This she said would enable government capital spending, above the current 3% of GDP per year limit, to promote growth. Labour would be both pro-worker and pro-business. Reeves did not think Britain would rejoin the European Union or its single market in the next 50 years. She said she was against the return of freedom of movement for workers between the UK and EU. Reeves also said that the falling membership of the Labour Party was a good thing, as it was shedding unwelcome supporters.

In her speech in Bury on 20 January 2022, where she was introduced by MP Christian Wakeford, who had recently defected to Labour from the Conservatives amid the Partygate scandal, she added more detail to her plan:

- A £28 billion per year climate investment plan, which would create UK based jobs and support battery manufacturing, hydrogen power, offshore wind, tree planting, flood defences and home insulation (which has since been backtracked on);
- A target of creating 100,000 new businesses over five years;
- Mutual recognition of professional qualifications with the EU;
- Veterinary agreements to help the food and drink industry;
- Restore visa-free touring for musicians.

In April 2022, after MPs agreed to refer the then prime minister, Boris Johnson, to the Commons Privileges Committee to investigate whether he was in contempt of Parliament for misleading them about the Downing Street lockdown parties, Reeves tweeted "Honesty and integrity matter in our politics, and for our democracy. Today the Conservatives failed to stand up for either. Britain deserves better".

In 2023, after the Labour Party dropped its pledge to scrap university tuition fees, Reeves said "the circumstances since [Starmer] became leader have changed significantly" and blamed the Conservative government's handling of the economy for the policy shift. Later that month, Reeves was ranked number one in the New Statesman's Left Power List 2023, above Keir Starmer, which described her as "the most influential person on the British left today".

On 31 January 2024, Reeves announced that Labour would not reintroduce a cap on bankers' bonuses, despite having questioned why the cap was being removed by the Conservatives in October 2023. The decision was linked to large inflows of money into the Labour Party from global banks, professional services firms, consultancies and financiers since 2022. The next day, Reeves announced that Labour would not raise corporation tax in the next parliament if it got into power.

On 8 February 2024, Starmer and Reeves announced that the £28 billion per year climate investment policy, seen as Labour's central economic and environmental policy, would be halved with two-thirds of that being existing spending. This reduction of investment was in response to the economic situation with higher interest rates, and to prevent Conservative criticism in the forthcoming general election. Reeves said "We want to bring jobs to Britain, to bring energy bills down, to boost our energy security, and also to decarbonise the economy ... If you don't need to spend £28 billion in doing that, that's great". The home insulation grants part of the policy would be most heavily curtailed, to protect schemes such as a publicly owned Great British Energy clean energy company and a sovereign wealth fund. Later that month, The Daily Telegraph reported that Reeves had accepted a £10,100 donation from Bernard Donoughue, a climate sceptic Labour peer, days before Labour abandoned its flagship £28 billion green energy spending pledge. Lord Donoughue told The Daily Telegraph that the donation was "totally unrelated" to the spending pledge.

== Chancellor of the Exchequer (2024–2026) ==
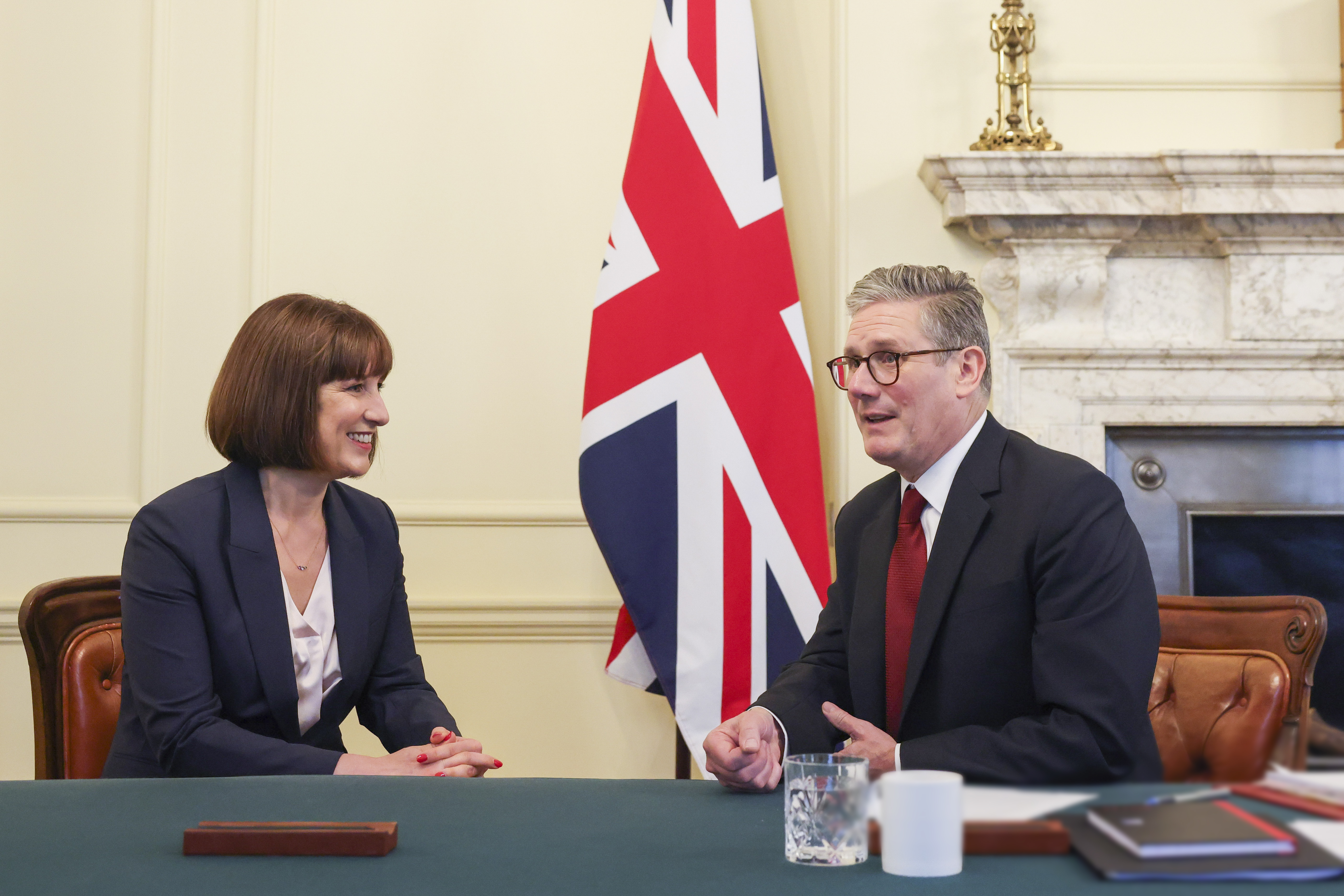
Reeves appointed as Chancellor of the Exchequer by Keir Starmer, 5 July 2024

Due to the 2023 review of Westminster constituencies, Reeves' constituency of Leeds West was abolished, and replaced with Leeds West and Pudsey. At the 2024 general election, Reeves was elected to Parliament as MP for Leeds West and Pudsey with 49.3% of the vote and a majority of 12,392.

Following Labour's landslide victory in the election and the formation of the Starmer ministry, Reeves was appointed to the government as Chancellor of the Exchequer. She became the first woman to hold the office of Chancellor in its over 800-year history. On taking office Reeves stated that since there is "not a huge amount of money" her focus will be on "unlocking" private-sector investment, as she believes "private-sector investment is the lifeblood of a successful economy." She made her first statement as Chancellor two days later, announcing measures to grow the economy. Reeves also announced her first budget would be released on 30 October 2024.

To every young woman and girl ... to every young woman and girl watching this: let today show that there should be no ceilings on your ambitions, your hopes or your dreams.

— Rachel Reeves' statement to HM Treasury, July 2024

On 9 July, Reeves announced that a national wealth fund would be established, with a total funding pot of £7.3 billion. The fund is described by Reeves as "concierge service for investors and businesses that want to invest in Britain, so they know where to go" and aims to attract £3 of private funds for every £1 provided by the public sector. The investments will then be managed by the existing UK Infrastructure Bank, headed by the former HSBC chief executive John Flint, with support from a revamped British Business Bank. The fund will seek to deploy £1.8 billion to ports, £1.5 billion for gigafactories including for electric vehicles, £2.5 billion to clean steel, £1 billion for carbon capture and £500 million to green hydrogen. As such the primary focus will be on green initiatives and traditional manufacturing, with no financial provision for digitisation, innovation or improvement in other sectors. On 14 October, Reeves announced that the UK Infrastructure Bank would become the National Wealth Fund. The rebranded fund received a cash injection of £5.8bn. This was £1.5bn less than the £7.3bn initially planned.

On 29 July, Reeves announced the findings of a spending audit which had been conducted after the 2024 general election, in which she accused the previous Conservative government of hiding a £21.9 billion "black hole" in the public finances. In the spending review, she announced £11.6 billion of public sector pay rises, including a two-year pay deal for junior doctors worth 22% on average to halt strike action. To cover the costs of the black hole, Reeves announced cuts worth £5.5 billion for 2024, rising to £8.1 billion in 2025. Amongst the decisions she announced were the scrapping of Winter Fuel Payments for pensioners who did not receive pension credit or other means-tested benefits, which received widespread criticism. She also cancelled the previous government's plans for the Advanced British Standard, and several planned infrastructure projects. She also confirmed several tax rises, including Labour's manifesto pledge to charge 20% VAT on private school fees which she confirmed would begin in January 2025, and an increase on the windfall tax on the profits of energy and gas companies to begin from November 2024.

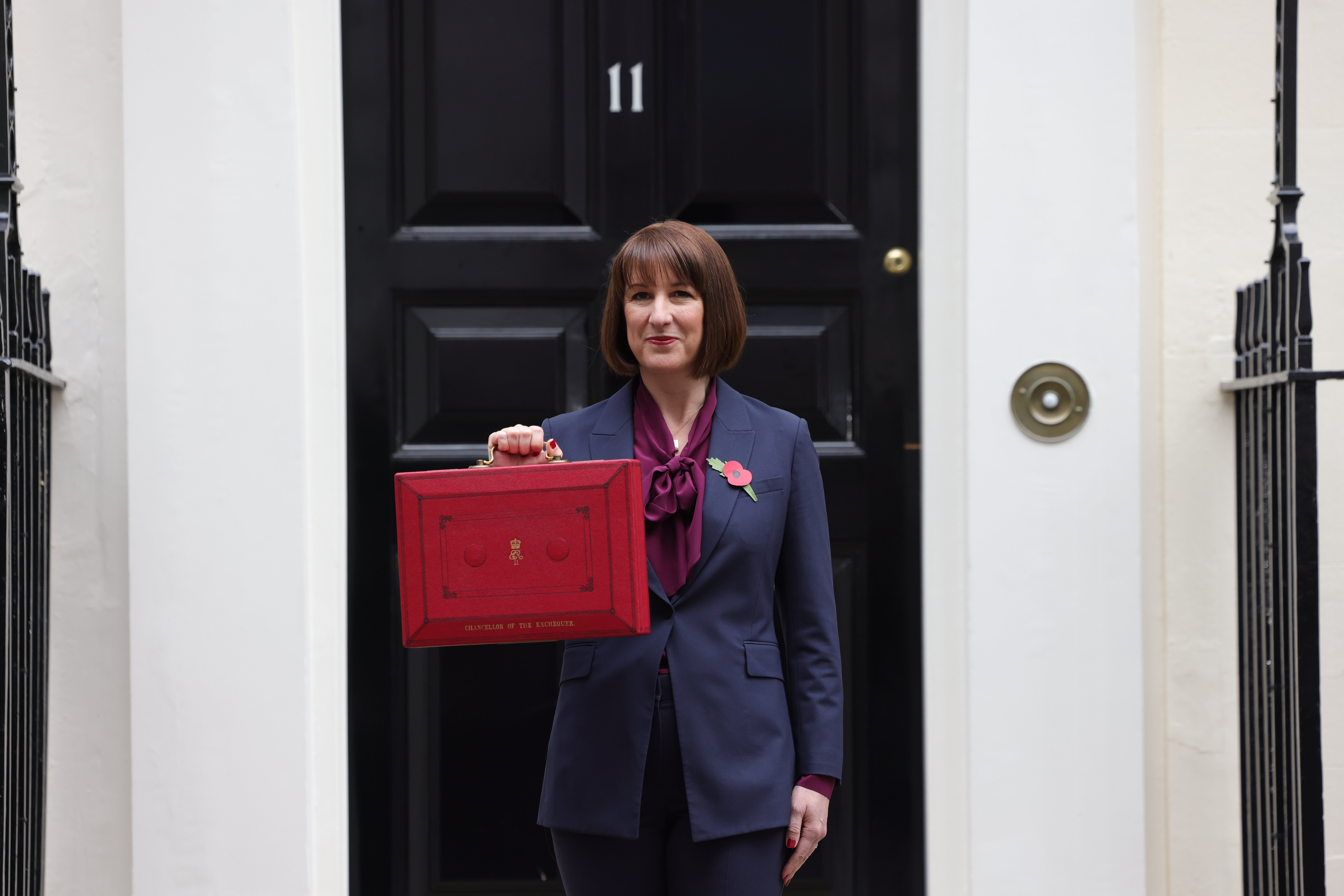
Reeves holding the red box

=== 2024 budget ===
On 30 October, Reeves presented her first budget, which was the first Labour budget since 2010 and the first budget in history to be delivered by a woman. In the budget, she announced tax rises worth £40 billion, the biggest tax rise at a budget since 1993. Amongst the measures she announced were an increase in employers' National Insurance to 15% on salaries above £5,000 from April 2025, income tax thresholds to rise in-line with inflation after 2028, changes to farm inheritance tax meaning that the inheritance tax of 20% would effectively apply to rural estates above the value of £1,000,000 from April 2026, and a rise in the single bus fare cap to £3 from January 2025. The OBR forecast that the budget would mean the tax burden would be set to its highest ever level in recorded history. The director of the Institute for Fiscal Studies, Paul Johnson, accused Reeves of further undermining trust in politicians. Reeves later said that it was not a budget she would want to repeat, and accepted that the tax rises would likely hit wage growth for workers. Reeves also said that she was "wrong" during the election about ruling out potential tax rises.

=== 2025 budget ===
Reeves presented the details of her second budget on 26 November 2025.

=== 2026 budget ===
Reeves presented the details of her third budget on 3 March 2026.

=== Alleged contravention of the ministerial code ===
The speaker of the House of Commons, Lindsay Hoyle, reprimanded Reeves in the Commons on 28 October 2024, saying he was "very, very disappointed" and found it totally unacceptable that she had given information to journalists in the US about the upcoming Budget, in contravention of the ministerial code. The code expects major government announcements to be made in the Commons before to the news media. Hoyle said the early revelations were a "supreme discourtesy to the House".

In 2025, details of the budget were once again leaked before it was delivered to the Commons when the Office for Budget Responsibility published its response on its website earlier that day.

=== Gifts and conflicts of interest ===
In September 2024, it was revealed that Reeves took £7,500 worth of clothing from two donors, Lord Alli and Juliet Rosenfeld, and defended this saying "It's not something that I'm going to do in Government". In January 2025, Reeves' Economic Secretary to the Treasury, and anti-corruption minister, Tulip Siddiq resigned after being named in Bangladesh's Anti-Corruption Commission.

In June 2025, it was revealed that Reeves took £27,000 in donations from an American lobbyist firm owned by KKR, a private equity firm that bid for Thames Water. This paid for campaign staff, and a £13,000 drinks reception after Reeves became Chancellor, while she reportedly pressured the Department for Environment and Rural Affairs not to put any water companies into public ownership.

In October 2025 it was reported that Reeves had rented out her London home without a required landlord licence. It later emerged that Reeves's husband had been told that the letting agent would apply for the licence on their behalf. The letting agent then resigned before the necessary landlord licence needed to be applied for, and as applying for this for clients was not usual procedure, the agency did not detect the error.

=== Public opinion ===
Reeves received poor satisfaction ratings in polls while Chancellor, with an Ipsos poll in November 2025 reporting the worst results for a Chancellor on record.

=== End of tenure ===
On 20 July 2026, Reeves tenure as Chancellor ended as Andy Burnham took office and appointed a new cabinet. She reportedly turned down another "big job" in the Burnham government and instead chose to return to the backbenches.

== Political positions ==
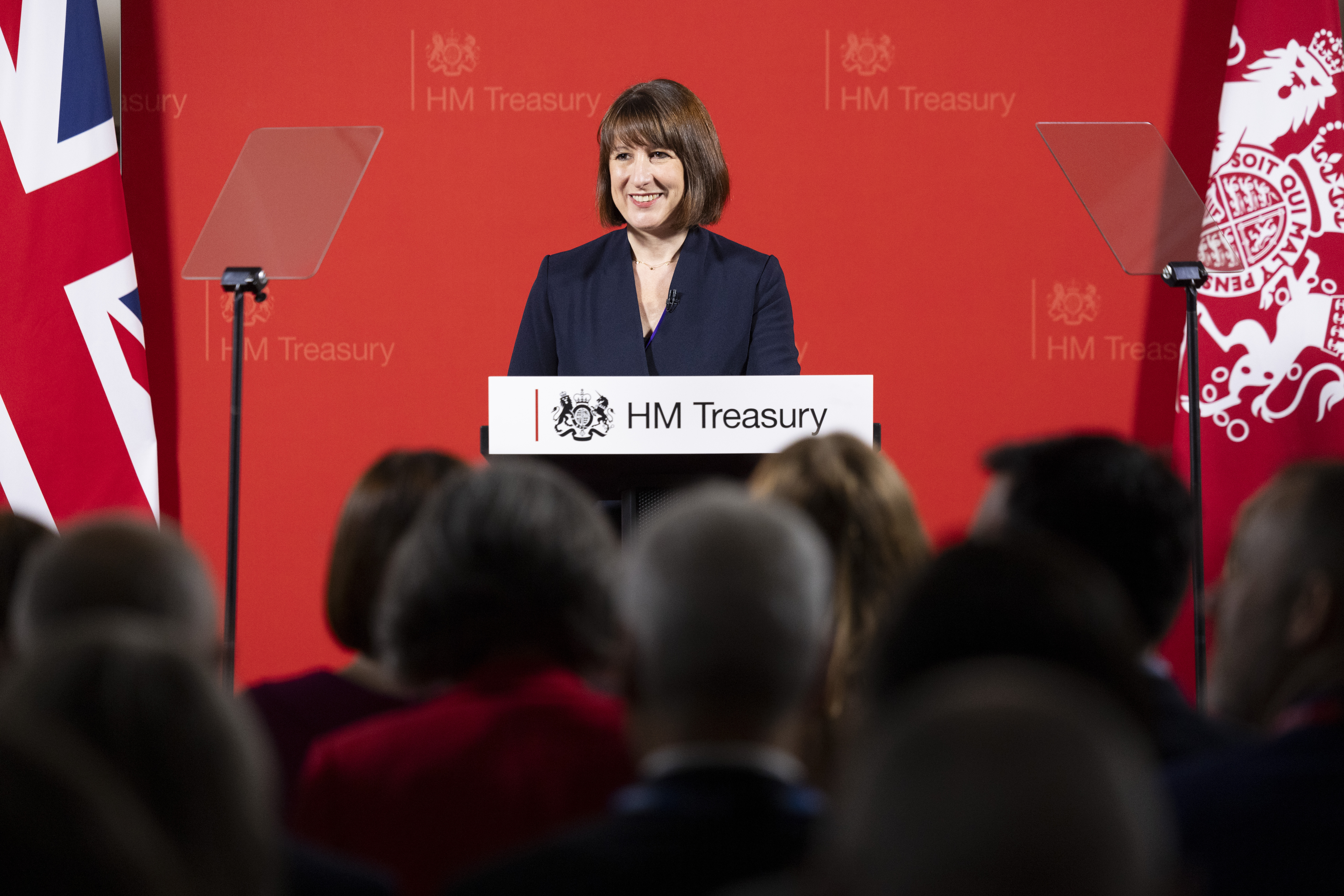
Reeves delivers her first speech as chancellor, July 2024

=== Domestic policy ===
==== Economy ====
Reeves is a member of the Fabian Society. She has written studies on the 2008 financial crisis for the Fabian Review, the Institute for Public Policy Research, the Socialist Environment and Resources Association, and the European Journal of Political Economy (Reeves' Who's Who entry incorrectly says that she contributed to the more prestigious Journal of Political Economy). In an article for Renewal entitled "The Politics of Deficit Reduction", Reeves offers her critique of the then-current financial situation and efforts to bring down the budget deficit. Reeves was a proponent of quantitative easing in 2009, to alleviate the Great Recession having studied the effects of the policy on Japan in the early 2000s.

==== Securonomics ====
Since 2022, Reeves has espoused "modern supply-side economics", an economic policy which focuses on infrastructure, education and labour supply by rejecting tax cuts and deregulation. In May 2023, Reeves coined the term "securonomics" to refer to her version of this economic policy, originally in a public address at the Peterson Institute for International Economics. It is heavily inspired by US president Joe Biden's economic policy, particularly his Inflation Reduction Act. Securonomics is based on the belief that globalisation has failed to achieve its stated aims and that economies in the Western world must adapt in response. It would involve a productivist "active state" taking a more active role in managing the free-market economy, boosting production and drawing up industrial policy, stronger supply chains, and more economic cooperation with international allies with similar economic goals. Reeves said she believed that the active state is part of an "emerging global consensus" led by Biden's administration which will replace the neoliberal economic consensus, and that economic policy must be driven by the need for security. Since the election, Reeves has stated that "there's not a huge amount of money so we need to unlock private-sector investment", which appears to preclude a significant fiscal role for the state in furthering productivity, and is thus closer to the traditional supply-side economics that modern supply-side rejects.

In an interview with the Financial Times in May 2023, Reeves said securonomics had to be based on "the rock of fiscal responsibility". She said her proposed £28 billion climate investment plan, Labour's version of the Inflation Reduction Act, had to "fit within her fiscal rules". In June 2023, the investment plan was revised to a gradual roll-out where the annual investment would rise gradually to £28 billion by around 2027. She argued that following the economic impact of the 2021–2023 global energy crisis, food price crisis and the Truss government's "mini-budget", the plan "will only be possible if we have an iron grip on public spending and tax receipts". The New Statesman reported that in an interview Reeves said "a Labour government would not introduce annual wealth and land taxes; raise income tax; equalise capital gains rates and income tax; rejoin the European single market and customs union; change the Bank of England's inflation target and reform its rigid mandate; or take private utilities into public ownership, except for the railways."

==== Transport ====
Reeves supported the High Speed 2 rail project, and raised the issue in the House of Commons, as well as campaigning for the proposed Kirkstall Forge railway station.

==== Education ====
Reeves opposes more selection in the education system. In 2018, she said that she wanted to see "more children educated at comprehensive schools" and "fewer children being educated at grammar and private schools", and said that she has always and "always will" oppose more selection in the education system due to her belief that it was a "backwards step not a forward step".

Reeves has been supportive of abolishing private schools. She said that independent schools "segregate children based on parental wealth" and "entrench privilege and divide communities". She has also been supportive of Labour Against Private Schools, a campaign group calling for private schools to be integrated into the state sector and previously for Eton College to be abolished, stating that she was "proud to stand" with the group at its launch in July 2019.

==== Culture ====
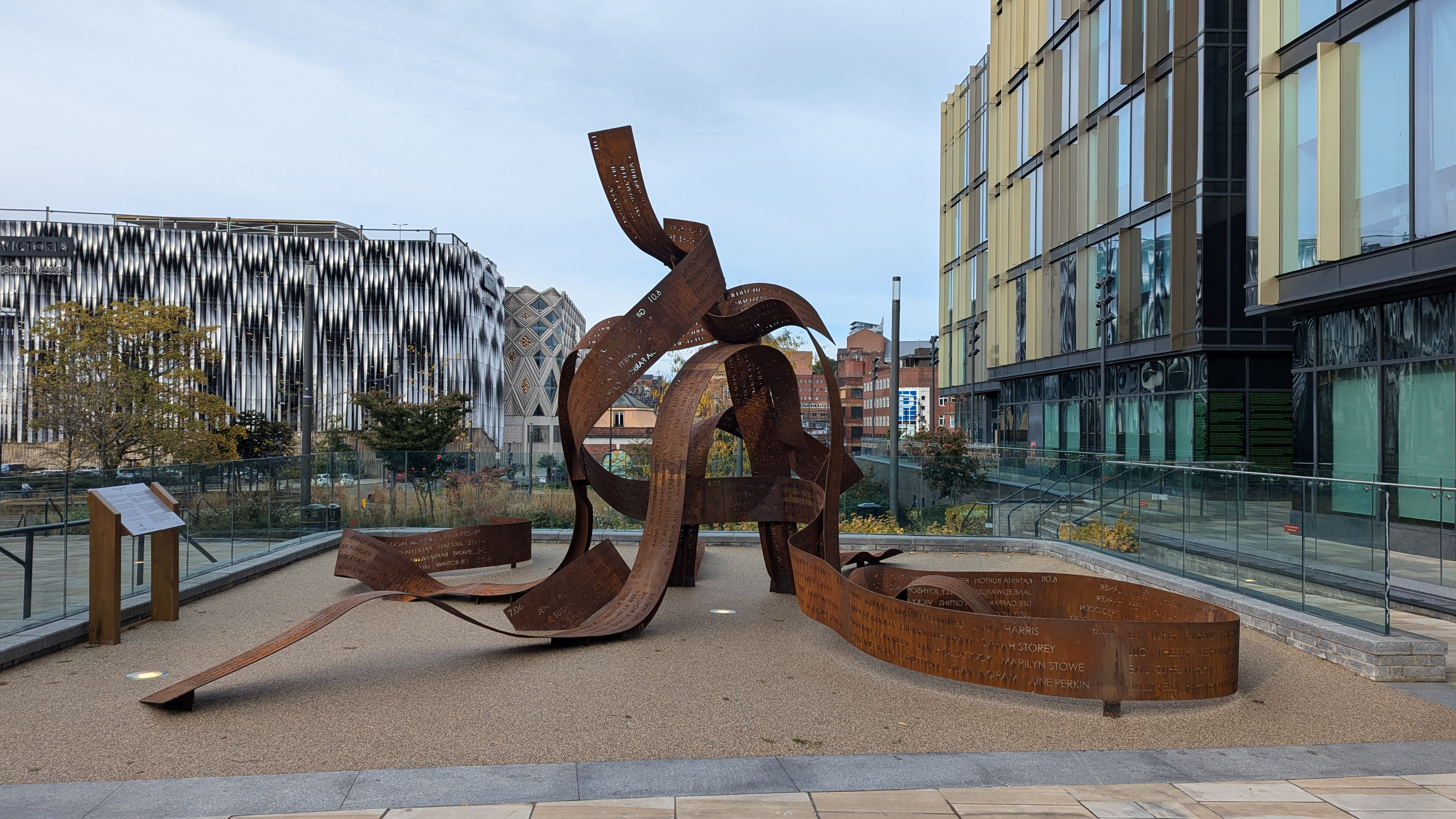
Ribbons by Pippa Hale

In 2008, Reeves was involved in the campaign to save the historic Bramley Baths. She instigated a partnership between Leeds Arts University, Leeds City College and Leeds City Council to create a new public artwork in Leeds that featured women. This project culminated in the unveiling of the sculpture Ribbons by Pippa Hale in 2024. The sculpture features the names of 383 publicly nominated women from the city.

==== Poverty ====
In 2018, whilst speaking about low unemployment levels, Reeves said that employment was a "way into poverty" and not a way out of it. In 2022, amidst the cost of living crisis, she said that, despite low unemployment levels, many jobs were paying wages that were "unaffordable" to live on, and called for benefits to rise in order to help reduce poverty levels. She also later said that the cost of living crisis, along with austerity and the COVID-19 pandemic, had severely impacted families, and proposed Labour's new deal for working people, reforms to Universal Credit and a child poverty strategy as measures to help reduce child poverty.

Early into her tenure as Chancellor of the Exchequer, Reeves opposed scrapping the two-child benefit cap. Despite pressures from backbench Labour MPs to lift the cap following an SNP motion that predicted scrapping the cap would immediately raise 300,000 children out of poverty, Reeves said that she would not make an "unfunded" pledge. Reeves cited Labour's proposals for the creation of more nurseries and free breakfast clubs at all primary schools as evidence of Labour's commitment to tackling the issue; stating that they would have a "material impact" on child poverty.

=== Social issues and civil liberties ===
==== Same-sex marriage ====
Reeves voted in favour of introducing same-sex marriage in England and Wales in 2013, and also voted in favour of introducing same-sex marriage in Northern Ireland in 2019.

==== Transgender rights ====
In September 2021, during an interview on LBC, Reeves was asked by presenter Nick Ferrari if it was transphobic to say only women have a cervix. She replied: "I wouldn't say that." Reeves has supported banning transgender women from competing in women's sport and excluding transgender women from using women's spaces. In an interview with The Times in 2022, Reeves stated in regards to transgender rights that "a woman is somebody with a biology that is different from a man's biology."

==== Assisted dying ====
In August 2024, Reeves was reported to be undecided on assisted dying. She referred to her maternal grandparents suffering from Alzheimer's disease and Dementia for the last years of their lives as examples of why she understands the desire for assisted dying legislation, but said she would fear that people would be "under pressure", and also said that she would want to make sure the "right safeguards" were in place. On 29 November 2024, Reeves voted in favour of Kim Leadbeater's Assisted Dying Bill on its second reading.

=== Foreign policy ===
==== Russia and Ukraine ====
Reeves condemned the February 2022 Russian invasion of Ukraine. In the same month of the invasion, Reeves, along with Shadow Foreign Secretary David Lammy and Shadow International Trade Secretary Nick Thomas-Symonds, wrote a letter to the government which called for further sanctions on what they described as a "heinous violation of international law". In the letter, they called on the government to: widen export controls to include luxury goods, widen the number of banks prevented from accessing sterling, apply sanctions to wealth under the name of family members, expand sectoral sanctions to cover insurance, and to sanction Russian President Vladimir Putin alongside "an expanded list of oligarchs and cronies".

Reeves opposed U.S. President Joe Biden's commitment to sending cluster bombs to Ukraine. She said that she was "not convinced" that they were "appropriate" weapons, and also said that it caused her "deep concern" and said that the weapons could have an impact "not just on the battlefield that time, on that day, but for months and years afterwards."

==== Israel and Palestine ====
Reeves is a vice-chair of Labour Friends of Israel, contributed a chapter to a book about Israeli politics and society, and supports the Auschwitz-Birkenau Foundation. In 2014, Reeves abstained on a parliamentary motion to recognise the State of Palestine, which was passed with support of the Labour Party under the leadership of Ed Miliband, after Reeves and other pro-Israel Labour MPs requested Miliband not to hold a three-line whip in favour of the motion.

Reeves condemned the 7 October 2023 Hamas attack on Israel and said that Israel had "every right" to defend itself as long as it abided by "international rules of engagement". Reeves said that she had "no time" for pro-Palestinian fringe events being held at the Labour conference. In response to Jeremy Corbyn's comments that to resolve the situation Israel should end its occupation of Palestine, Reeves said that Gaza is not occupied by Israel and said that the "real cause" of what was happening was a "terrorist attack". Reeves additionally said that she wanted to see "a Palestinian state existing alongside a safe and secure Israel" but said that terrorism was "not the way to get there".

In November 2023, Reeves described what was happening to "innocent civilians and particularly babies in that hospital" as "heartbreaking" and said that she was "incredibly concerned" by the scenes that were being seen in Gaza. She urged Israel to "show restraint" and "allow water, medicine, fuel into Gaza and into those hospitals" and called on Rishi Sunak's government and other international allies to "put more pressure on" Benjamin Netanyahu's government to show restraint. She also defended Keir Starmer's refusal to back a ceasefire, saying that a ceasefire was "not something you can dictate" and that it "has to be negotiated".

In December 2025, during a speech addressing Labour Friends of Israel, Reeves announced that she is unapologetic about being a Zionist and that the label should not be "surrendered to anti-Semites."

==== Brexit and European Union ====
Reeves campaigned to remain in the European Union (EU) in the 2016 Brexit referendum. After the result was in favour of leaving in the EU, Reeves called for a stricter immigration policy by an end to free movement as part of the Brexit deal, but also called for the "greatest possible access" to the single market without having free movement. Reeves also called for imports and exports to be kept tariff-free post-Brexit, for there to be "adequate investment in infrastructure" across the country rather than just in London, for a system of universal free childcare for all working parents of pre-school children which she said should be funded by scrapping the cuts to inheritance tax by Chancellor George Osborne, and also for the UK to "shadow" to the EU's employment legislation.

In the Fabian Society booklet Beyond Brexit, she wrote: "I firmly believe that membership of the customs union and single market is the best way of protecting jobs and growth and providing a stable platform from which Labour can build its new economic settlement. Staying in the customs union and the single market is the best outcome for our economy and the best outcome for households across Britain".

Reeves supported a people's vote, a proposed second referendum on Brexit, and said that Labour would campaign for remaining in the EU if the second referendum was held. She opposed restrictions on the free movement of labour and said that the country would be "poorer with fewer jobs" outside of the EU, but also said that business could not "carry on as usual" and called for there to be "reform" to the EU. In 2020, as Shadow Chancellor of the Duchy of Lancaster, Reeves said she would "much rather" the country to remain in the EU but said it would not help the country "move on", and confirmed that the Labour party would not rejoin the EU if elected to government.

Reeves has referred to immigration as a leading cause of the country voting to leave in the referendum, saying in an interview with the Financial Times in 2024 that when her constituents voted to leave it was "purely because of immigration".

==== China ====
In a speech outlining her securonomics policy in July 2023, Reeves asserted that a "rising China" was "unbalancing the old global order of a unipolar world". She later said in March 2024 that China "looms large on the world stage" in reference to what she perceives as a shift in the world to a "unbalanced multipolarity".

Reeves has previously called for reducing the economic reliance of the UK with China. She previously said in 2022 that she thinks that the UK is "still too over-reliant on China" and also said that the UK was "overly reliant" on countries that do not share the UK's values for "basic needs". However, she insisted that she meant it "doesn't mean cutting off all links" with China but instead protecting national security as the "first thing" needed to be done. As Chancellor of the Exchequer, Reeves opposed imposing tariffs on China's electric vehicles in the October 2024 budget, stating that she did not want to "close the UK economy down to imports and exports", and also said that the UK does "benefit from trade links around the world, including China".

Reeves' visit to China in the middle of January 2025 aims to strengthen economic ties with Beijing. The focus of the meeting will be on normalising relations with the UK. In December 2024, Reeves mentioned that there is a "pragmatic" relationship with China, stating that they are the fifth-largest trading partner and have invested £32 billion in exports.

== Writing ==
Echoing similar titles of publications by Roy Jenkins in 1959 and Tony Wright in 1997, Reeves wrote the new edition of Why Vote Labour? in the run-up to the 2010 general election, as part of a series giving the case for each of the main political parties.

Her biography of the Labour politician Alice Bacon, Baroness Bacon (1909–1993), titled Alice in Westminster: The Political Life of Alice Bacon, was published in 2017. Bacon was the first and previously only woman to represent a Leeds constituency, having represented Leeds North East and then Leeds South East between 1945 and 1970.

In October 2023, Reeves' book The Women Who Made Modern Economics was published. The Guardian said the book contained "something much more like the outlines of a coherent political project ... than Labour is sometimes credited with". The Financial Times reported that the book "lifted" content from Wikipedia, The Guardian and other sources, identifying over twenty examples of apparent plagiarism in the book, including entire paragraphs. Reeves told BBC News that some sentences "were not properly referenced" and this would be corrected in future reprints.

== Honours ==
In June 2023, it was announced that Reeves was elected an Honorary Fellow of New College, Oxford. Her name is one of those featured on the sculpture Ribbons, unveiled in 2024. A portrait of Reeves was painted by Sally Ward in 2026 in a commission for the Parliamentary Art Collection.

== Personal life ==
Reeves is married to Nicholas Joicey, a civil servant and Gordon Brown's former private secretary and speech writer. They met while Reeves was working in Washington. The couple have homes in Bramley, Leeds and Dulwich, London. Reeves announced her first pregnancy on 20 September 2012 and gave birth to a daughter, and in 2015 to a son. She is a practising Christian; during the 2024 election campaign she publicly apologised to her vicar for her recent absence from church, saying "I've been quite busy."

Parliament of the United Kingdom
| Preceded by John Battle | Member of Parliament for Leeds West; 2010–2024 | Constituency abolished |
| New constituency | Member of Parliament for Leeds West and Pudsey; 2024–present | Incumbent |
Political offices
| Preceded by Angela Eagle | Shadow Minister for Pensions; 2010–2011 | Succeeded by Gregg McClymont |
| Preceded by Angela Eagle | Shadow Chief Secretary to the Treasury; 2011–2013 | Succeeded by Chris Leslie |
| Preceded by Liam Byrne | Shadow Secretary of State for Work and Pensions; 2013–2015 | Succeeded by Stephen Timms; Acting |
| Vacant Title last held by Francis Maude | Shadow Chancellor of the Duchy of Lancaster; 2020–2021 | Succeeded by Angela Rayner |
| Preceded by Jon Trickett | Shadow Minister for the Cabinet Office; 2020–2021 | Succeeded by Angela Rayner |
| Preceded by Anneliese Dodds | Shadow Chancellor of the Exchequer; 2021–2024 | Succeeded by Jeremy Hunt |
| Preceded by Jeremy Hunt | Chancellor of the Exchequer; 2024–2026 | Succeeded by John Healey |
