= National Wealth Fund (United Kingdom) =

Public finance institution in the UK

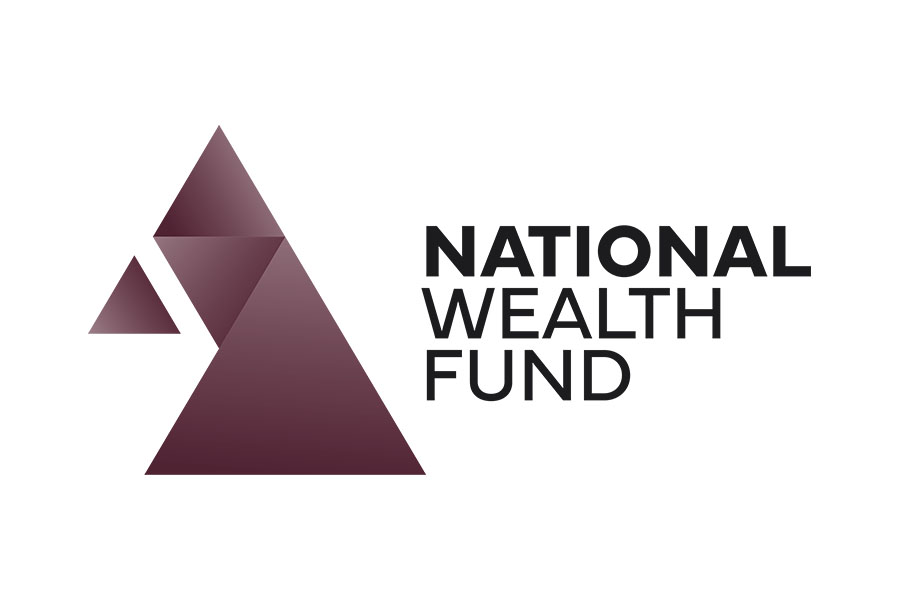

- Headquarters in Leeds, UK
- Formerly: UK Infrastructure Bank (2020–2024)
- Type: Sovereign wealth fund
- Industry: Financial services
- Founded: June 2021; 5 years ago
- Headquarters: Leeds, England, UK
- Area served: United Kingdom
- Key people: Chris Grigg (chair); Oliver Holbourne (CEO)
- AUM: £27.8 billion (October 2024)
- Owner: Government of the United Kingdom
- Website: nationalwealthfund.org.uk

The National Wealth Fund is a public finance institution of the United Kingdom, created in October 2024 when the UK Infrastructure Bank was refocused and branded as the National Wealth Fund to mobilise private capital for clean energy and industrial transformation, and to support long-term regional growth. It is sponsored by HM Treasury and operates at arm’s length under a Statement of Strategic Priorities for the 2024 to 2029 Parliament.

The fund has up to £27.8 billion of public capital announced for deployment through equity, loans, guarantees and local-authority lending, with the objective of "crowding in" larger volumes of private investment. Its activities complement other UK institutions, including the British Business Bank for small and medium-sized enterprises and Great British Energy for power-sector projects. Analysts describe the fund as a national investment vehicle rather than a classic sovereign wealth fund, and note that outcomes will depend on governance, project pipelines and wider planning and grid reforms.

Additional funding of £15.4 billion added in the UK 2026 budget bringing total to £43.2 billion.

== History and establishment ==
=== Origins ===
The National Wealth Fund traces its origins to the UK Infrastructure Bank (UKIB), which was created in 2021 to support regional and local economic growth and to help tackle climate change. UKIB’s role was put on a statutory footing by the UK Infrastructure Bank Act 2023.

=== Creation and transition (October 2024) ===
On 14 October 2024 the government launched the National Wealth Fund and announced that the UK Infrastructure Bank would become the National Wealth Fund, expanding its remit beyond infrastructure to support wider industrial transformation and to mobilise private capital. A House of Commons Library briefing summarised the change and set out how the fund’s objectives relate to existing UK public investment bodies.

=== Statement of Strategic Priorities (March 2025) ===
On 19 March 2025 the Chancellor issued a Statement of Strategic Priorities to the National Wealth Fund, setting the fund’s direction for the 2024 to 2029 Parliament. The statement confirms the fund’s strategic objectives and sets out priority areas for investment and partnership working. The Chancellor also announced that the National Wealth Fund could also be spent on defence.

=== Early activities ===
In May 2025 the fund announced a £600 million commitment to support grid upgrades by ScottishPower, the UK subsidiary of Iberdrola, as part of a wider financing package arranged with commercial lenders. Press coverage reported it as the fund’s largest commitment to date and highlighted its role in accelerating transmission investment to integrate more renewable generation.

== Governance and structure ==
=== Sponsorship and independence ===
The National Wealth Fund is wholly owned by HM Treasury and operates at arm’s length. Official material states that the Treasury is the shareholder and sets the overall priorities through a Statement of Strategic Priorities, while the fund is operationally independent in delivery.

=== Board and committees ===
The fund is governed by a board that provides leadership and sets strategic direction. Terms of reference describe the board’s role and confirm the existence of three standing committees for audit and risk, remuneration, and nominations. Government announcements in late 2025 recorded the appointment of additional non-executive directors to strengthen investment, risk and regional expertise on the board, which is chaired by Chris Grigg.

=== Executive leadership ===
Leadership changed during 2025. On 15 July 2025 the Chancellor announced Oliver Holbourn as incoming chief executive. National Wealth Fund updates noted that Ian Brown served as interim chief executive until 1 November 2025, and the website lists the executive committee members by function.

== Capitalisation and instruments ==
Government material announced that the National Wealth Fund has up to £27.8 billion of public capital for deployment, with the aim of mobilising larger volumes of private investment alongside it. The policy paper published on 14 October 2024 sets out the initial scale and confirms that capital can be committed through a range of products. The Statement of Strategic Priorities issued on 19 March 2025 reiterates that the fund’s role is to crowd in private finance while operating at arm’s length from ministers.

According to the fund’s published information, investment can be structured to address project and sector needs. Instruments include equity co-investment, loans and other forms of debt, guarantees and credit enhancements, and targeted support to local authorities through lending programmes. The fund indicates that commercially oriented structures may be used where they help unlock delivery, subject to value-for-money and risk management requirements.

== Investment priorities and sectors ==
For the 2024 to 2029 parliament the Statement of Strategic Priorities asks the National Wealth Fund to focus on four sectors: clean energy, advanced manufacturing, digital and technologies, and transport. Government and fund material state that during this parliament at least £5.8 billion will be committed across five sub-sectors: carbon capture and storage, green hydrogen, ports, gigafactories and green steel. As of October 2025 the Statement of Strategic Priorities and fund strategy pages do not list defence as a priority sector. Sources also note continuity from the former UK Infrastructure Bank remit; areas such as water, waste and natural capital can remain relevant where they align with the shareholder’s priorities for this parliament.

=== Clean energy ===
This priority covers investment that supports deployment and enabling infrastructure aligned with growth and net-zero missions during this parliament. Published priorities include projects related to carbon capture and to hydrogen production and use, with the objective of crowding in private finance. The fund’s activity can complement revenue-support mechanisms for low-carbon power such as the government’s Contracts for Difference scheme and with system planning signals published by the National Energy System Operator.

=== Advanced manufacturing ===
This priority targets capital-intensive industries important for industrial transformation in this parliament. Official material highlights gigafactories and green steel as named sub-sectors for earmarked funding, and independent explainers situate these within a broader supply-chain resilience agenda linked to the UK’s Industrial strategy.

=== Digital and technologies ===
This sector includes activities that enable productivity growth and the transition to a low-carbon economy, continuing strands of the former UK Infrastructure Bank’s mandate while focusing investment where it can mobilise private capital at scale. As of October 2025 detailed allocations are expected to be set out in the fund’s strategic plan for this parliament.

=== Transport and ports ===
This priority includes assets and infrastructure that support the movement of people and goods. Government material gives ports as a sub-sector for committed funding during this parliament, with commentary linking investment needs to decarbonisation and regional growth objectives in the UK’s transport policy context.

== Activities and selected investments ==
As of October 2025, the fund has announced selected commitments in line with its priorities for the 2024 to 2029 parliament. Publicly reported examples include:

- 8 May 2025: up to £600 million of debt financing to support electricity grid upgrades by ScottishPower, the UK subsidiary of Iberdrola. The fund described the commitment as part of a wider package arranged with commercial lenders, and the Financial Times reported on the scale and purpose of the investment.

== Performance and reporting ==
The fund publishes an annual report and accounts that is audited by the National Audit Office and laid before Parliament. The 2023 to 2024 report covers activity in the year to 31 March 2024 and sets out performance, governance and financial statements. In addition, the fund has adopted an Impact Framework that defines how it measures and evaluates results across core indicators such as private capital mobilised, greenhouse-gas impact, jobs supported and geographic spread, and explains the methodology for avoiding double counting in co-financed transactions.

As of October 2025, the fund has published its inaugural Impact Report summarising progress against the Statement of Strategic Priorities for the 2024 to 2029 parliament and signposting data sources and methods. Parliamentary oversight includes a Treasury Select Committee inquiry into whether the fund has the tools and resources to achieve its aims, and NAO publications that set out lessons for public financial institutions involved in mobilising private finance.

== Relationship to other UK institutions ==
Government material explains that the National Wealth Fund operates alongside other public bodies and market institutions rather than replacing them. The Statement of Strategic Priorities and policy papers set the fund’s remit and describe how it complements existing schemes and delivery routes.

In clean power delivery and market frameworks the fund’s investment role sits alongside the government’s Contracts for Difference scheme for low carbon power and the functions of the Low Carbon Contracts Company as the CfD counterparty. The National Energy System Operator coordinates connections to the transmission system and leads connections reform and planning signals used by industry.

In enterprise and small business finance the fund’s mandate is distinct from that of the British Business Bank, which supports access to finance for smaller businesses through debt and equity programmes. Official explainers present the two institutions as complementary, with the National Wealth Fund focused on capital intensive investments that mobilise private capital at scale.

Where projects have an export component UK Export Finance provides guarantees, insurance and direct lending to support UK exports. UK Export Finance support applies only where there is an eligible export link; domestic-only projects fall outside its remit.

For policy and sponsorship the fund is sponsored by HM Treasury, which issues the Statement of Strategic Priorities and oversees performance. Coordination with the Department for Business and Trade occurs through sector policy and investment promotion. Joint activity is subject to the UK subsidy control regime and public procurement rules, which set compliance parameters for awards and contracting.

== Reception and analysis ==
Independent commentary has described potential benefits and risks associated with the fund’s design. The Institute for Government states that a national investment vehicle can help mobilise private capital for clean energy and industrial transformation when objectives are clear, governance is strong and delivery bodies are coordinated. The Institution of Civil Engineers argues that success will depend on project pipelines, planning and grid capacity, and on using the fund to address specific barriers rather than to duplicate existing schemes.

Parliamentary and audit scrutiny has focused on additionality, value for money and transparency. The House of Commons Library outlines debate on whether public capital will crowd in private finance at scale and how benefits should be measured. The Treasury Committee opened an inquiry into the National Wealth Fund in 2025 that examines governance, priorities and reporting against the Statement of Strategic Priorities. The National Audit Office sets out lessons for public financial institutions on mobilising private finance, including the need for clear methodologies to avoid double counting and for proportionate risk transfer to the private sector.

Press coverage of early activity reported the scale and purpose of the fund’s debt commitment to support grid upgrades by ScottishPower, the UK subsidiary of Iberdrola, and noted its role alongside commercial lenders.

== See also ==
- British Business Bank
- Contracts for Difference
- Development finance institution
- Energy policy of the United Kingdom
- Green Investment Group
- Great British Energy
- HM Treasury
- Industrial strategy
- National Audit Office (United Kingdom)
- National Infrastructure Commission
- Ofgem
- Sovereign wealth fund
- UK Export Finance
- UK Infrastructure Bank
