= Premiership of Keir Starmer =

Period of the Government of the United Kingdom from 2024 to 2026

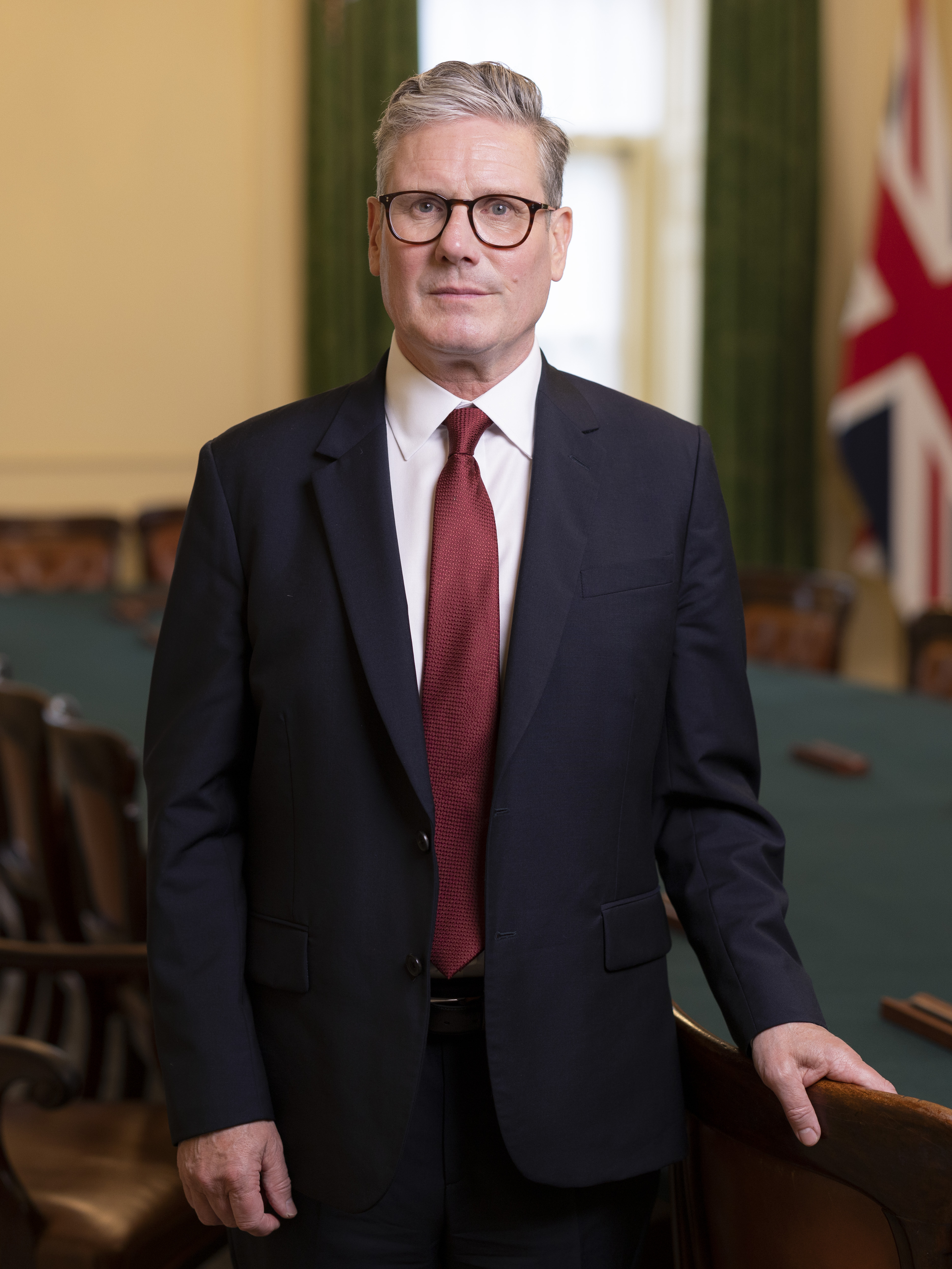
- Official portrait, 2024
- Premiership of Keir Starmer; 5 July 2024 – 20 July 2026
- Monarch: Charles III
- Cabinet: Starmer ministry
- Party: Labour
- Election: 2024
- Seat: 10 Downing Street
- Coat of Arms of His Majesty's Government

Keir Starmer's tenure as Prime Minister of the United Kingdom began on 5 July 2024 when he accepted an invitation from King Charles III to form a government, succeeding Rishi Sunak of the Conservative Party, and concluded upon his resignation on 20 July 2026. As prime minister Starmer also served simultaneously as First Lord of the Treasury, Minister for the Civil Service and Minister for the Union.

Starmer, who had been Leader of the Labour Party since 2020, was appointed prime minister after his party had won a landslide victory at the 2024 general election, ending fourteen years of Conservative governance, becoming the first Labour prime minister since Gordon Brown in 2010 and the first Labour leader to win a general election since Tony Blair in 2005, but with the smallest share of the electoral vote of any majority government since record-keeping of the popular vote began in 1830. Under Starmer's premiership, the government ended certain Winter Fuel Payments for around 10 million people, implemented an early-release scheme for thousands of prisoners to reduce prison overcrowding, settled a number of public-sector strikes and announced the establishment of Great British Energy. He also in order to stop the industry from collapsing announced the nationalisation of Great British Steel. Rachel Reeves introduced the largest tax rises at a budget since March 1993 in her October 2024 budget. Starmer announced the Border Security Command to replace the defunct Rwanda asylum plan and the National Violent Disorder Programme in response to the 2024 riots, as well as reforms to workers' rights. In foreign policy, Starmer supported Ukraine against the Russian invasion and initially supported Israel in the Gaza war, but later called for a ceasefire in the Gaza Strip and condemned Israel's actions. In September 2025, his government formally recognised the State of Palestine. Starmer responded to the 2026 Iran war by shooting down Iranian drones and missiles over allied countries in the Middle East, but denied a request from US president Donald Trump to use British military bases and criticised opposition leaders Nigel Farage and Kemi Badenoch for their immediate support for the war.

Starmer was viewed unfavourably by the British public during his premiership. Starmer's approval ratings fell to historical lows for a British prime minister, drawing comparisons to Liz Truss. His net approval rating began slightly positive, but fell from +5% after the election to −30% by January 2025 before levelling off until April 2025 when it began to decline further, reaching −32% by November that year. A poll found 35% of the public were satisfied with Starmer's job performance, 65% dissatisfied, giving a net approval rating of minus 30. Starmer's average net approval remained higher than Boris Johnson's during the Partygate scandal, Jeremy Corbyn's when he resigned as Labour leader and when Truss resigned as prime minister. Starmer's unpopularity was tied to poor results for Labour in the 2025 United Kingdom local elections. Likewise, the party garnered poor polling numbers ahead of the 2026 United Kingdom local elections, the 2026 Scottish Parliament election and the 2026 Senedd election, which culminated in a leadership crisis beginning in May 2026. On 22 June 2026, days following Andy Burnham's return to parliament, Starmer announced his resignation as Prime Minister and as leader of the Labour Party, and was succeeded as prime minister by Burnham, who won the leadership election.

== Background ==
=== Labour leadership bid ===
On 4 January 2020 Keir Starmer announced his candidacy for the Labour Party leadership election. By 8 January it was reported that he had gained enough nominations from Labour members of Parliament (MPs) and members of the European Parliament (MEPs) to get onto the ballot paper, and that the trade union Unison was backing him. Unison, with 1.3 million members, said Starmer was the best-placed candidate to unite the party and regain public trust. He was also supported by the former prime minister Gordon Brown and the mayor of London, Sadiq Khan.

During the leadership election, Starmer stood on a left-wing platform. He positioned himself in opposition to austerity, stating that the outgoing leader, Jeremy Corbyn, was "right" to position Labour as the "party of anti-austerity". He indicated he would continue with the Labour policy of scrapping tuition fees as well as pledging "common ownership" of rail, mail, energy and water companies and called for ending outsourcing in the National Health Service (NHS), local governments and the justice system. Starmer was announced as the winner of the leadership contest on 4 April 2020, defeating his rivals, Rebecca Long-Bailey and Lisa Nandy, with 56.2% of the vote in the first round. As Leader of the Opposition, contrary to his leadership campaign, he moved the party towards the political centre, and also emphasised the project of eliminating antisemitism within the party. In 2023 he set out five missions for his government, targeting issues such as economic growth, health, clean energy, crime and education.

=== 2024 general election ===
On 22 May 2024, Prime Minister Rishi Sunak unexpectedly announced that a general election would be held on 4 July 2024. Labour entered the general election with a large lead over the Conservative Party in opinion polls, and the potential scale of the party's victory was a topic of discussion during the campaign period. In June 2024 Starmer released the Labour Party's manifesto, Change, which focuses on economic growth, planning system reforms, infrastructure, what Starmer describes as "clean energy", healthcare, education, childcare and strengthening workers' rights. It pledges a new publicly owned energy company (Great British Energy), a "Green Prosperity Plan", reducing patient waiting times in the NHS, and renationalisation of the railway network (Great British Railways). It includes wealth creation and "pro-business and pro-worker" policies. The manifesto also pledged to give votes to 16 year olds, reform the House of Lords, and to tax private schools, with money generated going into improving state education.

In July 2024 Starmer led Labour to a landslide victory in the general election, ending fourteen years of Conservative government with Labour becoming the largest party in the House of Commons. Labour achieved a 174-seat simple majority and a total of 411 seats, (Note: The figure does not include Lindsay Hoyle, the speaker of the House of Commons, who was included in the Labour seat total by some media outlets. By longstanding convention, the speaker severs all ties to their affiliated party upon being elected speaker.) the party's third-best result in terms of seat share following the 1997 and 2001 general elections. The party had the most seats in England for the first time since 2005, in Scotland for the first time since 2010, and retained its status as the largest party in Wales.

In his victory speech Starmer thanked party workers for their work – including nearly five years of revamping and rebranding Labour in the face of Conservative dominance – and urged them to savour the moment, but warned them of challenges ahead and pledged his government would work for "national renewal":

We did it! You campaigned for it, you fought for it, you voted for it and now it has arrived. Change begins now. And it feels good, I have to be honest. Four-and-a-half years of work changing the party. This is what it is for – a changed Labour Party ready to serve our country, ready to restore Britain to the service of working people. And across our country people will be waking up to the news, relieved that a weight has been lifted, a burden finally removed from the shoulders of this great nation. And now we can look forward. Walk into the morning, the sunlight of hope, pale at first but getting stronger through the day, shining once again, on a country with the opportunity after 14 years to get its future back. We said we would end the chaos and we will. We said we would turn the page and we have. Today we start the next chapter, begin the work of change, the mission of national renewal and start to rebuild our country.

== Premiership ==
=== Appointment as prime minister ===
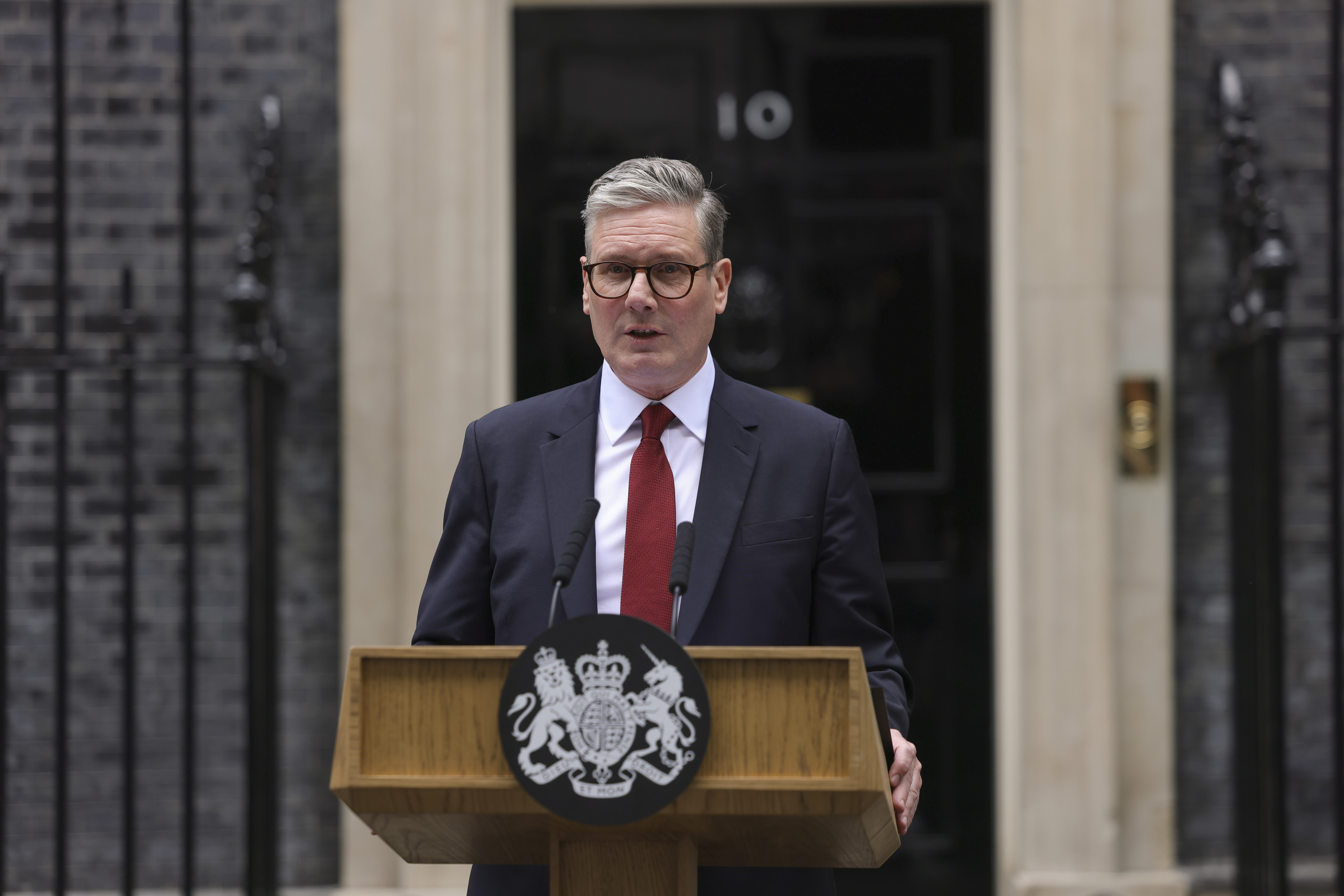
Starmer giving his first speech as prime minister at 10 Downing Street, 5 July 2024

As the leader of the majority party in the House of Commons, Starmer was appointed as prime minister by King Charles III on 5 July 2024, becoming the first Labour prime minister since Gordon Brown, the first Labour leader to win a general election since Tony Blair, and the first prime minister to enter office with a knighthood since Alec Douglas-Home. He and his wife, Victoria Starmer, were driven from Buckingham Palace to Downing Street. Starmer stopped the car on the way back from the palace and went on a walkabout outside Downing Street to meet cheering crowds. In his first speech as prime minister, Starmer paid tribute to the previous prime minister Rishi Sunak, saying "His achievement as the first British Asian Prime Minister of our country should not be underestimated by anyone," and also recognised "the dedication and hard work he brought to his leadership" but said that the people of Britain had voted for change:

You have given us a clear mandate, and we will use it to deliver change. To restore service and respect to politics, end the era of noisy performance, tread more lightly on your lives, and unite our country. Four nations, standing together again, facing down, as we have so often in our past, the challenges of an insecure world. Committed to a calm and patient rebuilding. So with respect and humility, I invite you all to join this government of service in the mission of national renewal. Our work is urgent and we begin it today.

=== State Opening of Parliament ===
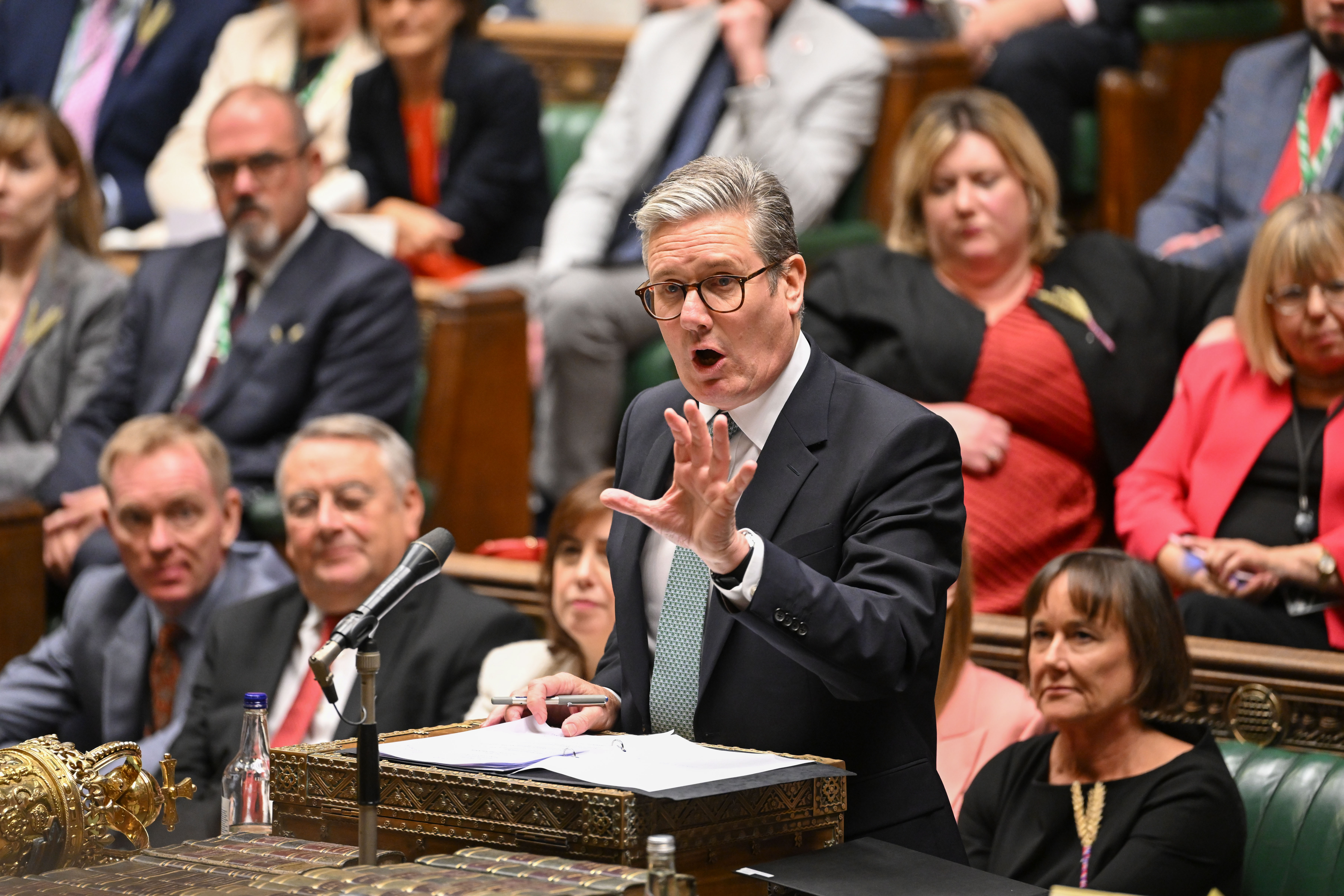
Starmer at Prime Minister's Questions, 11 September 2024

The 2024 State Opening of Parliament outlined 39 pieces of legislation that Labour proposed to introduced in the months ahead, including bills to renationalise the railways, to strengthen the rights of workers, tackle illegal immigration, reform the House of Lords and undertake a programme to hasten the delivery of "high quality infrastructure" and housing. In addition, a number of bills proposed by Sunak's Conservative administration were also included, particularly the Tobacco and Vapes Bill, which had appeared in the 2023 King's Speech, but had been abandoned after the election was called.

==== Bills ====
- The Passenger Railway Services (Public Ownership) Bill enabling the government to renationalise the railways.
- The Railways Bill to establish Great British Railways, a body overseeing the rail network.
- The Better Buses Bill allowing greater scope for local government to take over the running of bus services.
- The High Speed Rail (Crewe - Manchester) Bill to enable powers to improve rail services in northern England.
- The English Devolution and Community Empowerment Bill to facilitate the devolvement of power to elected mayors of combined authorities.
- Reform of the House of Lords. Two separate bills: to phase out the remaining hereditary peers in the House of Lords (House of Lords (Hereditary Peers) Bill), and to increase the number of female bishops in the House (Lords Spiritual (Women) Act 2015 (Extension) Bill).
- The Budget Responsibility Bill requiring an official budget forecast to take place ahead of a government budget. Given royal assent on 10 September 2024.
- The Pension Schemes Bill introducing new rules and requirements for private sector pension schemes.
- The Planning and Infrastructure Bill to simplify the approval process for critical infrastructure, and update compulsory purchase rules.
- The Renters' Rights Bill banning no-fault evictions and extending building safety requirements to the private sector.
- The Leasehold and Commonhold Reform Bill curbing ground rent costs and banning forfeiture.
- The Great British Energy Bill to establish GB Energy, a state owned energy investment and generation company.
- The National Wealth Fund Bill establishing a £7.3bn fund to be invested over five years in infrastructure and green industry.
- The Water (Special Measures) Bill giving the water regulator Ofwat greater powers to prevent water company bosses from receiving bonuses, and to make water company bosses liable for any illegal activity.
- The Crime and Policing Bill to give police greater powers to deal with antisocial behaviour. The bill will also make assaulting retail workers a specific offence.
- The Terrorism (Protection of Premises) Bill to require venues to establish procedures for dealing with terrorist threats, enacting Martyn's Law.
- The Victims, Courts and Public Protection Bill requiring offenders to attend sentencing hearings and removing parental rights from convicted sex offenders.
- The Border Security, Asylum and Immigration Bill enabling police to use anti-terrorism laws to tackle gangs who smuggle asylum seekers to the UK.
- The Employment Rights Bill introducing a number new rights for workers, and banning the "exploitative" use of zero hour contracts.
- The Equality (Race and Disability) Bill extending the right to make a claim for equal pay under the Equality Act to people from ethnic minorities and people with disabilities.
- The Tobacco and Vapes Bill to bring in a phased ban on smoking.
- The Mental Health Bill to tighten rules on sectioning people, and change the rules on care for people with learning difficulties.
- The Children's Wellbeing Bill requiring local authorities to keep a register of children not in full time education at school, and establish breakfast clubs for all primary schools in England.
- The Skills England Bill to establish a public body to improve and devolve skills training.
- The Conversion Practices Bill restricting "abusive" practices designed to change a person's sexual orientation or gender identity.
- The Digital Information and Smart Data Bill enabling people to use a digital ID to buy age-restricted content and for pre-employment checks.
- The Cyber Security and Resilience Bill establishing new rules to protect critical infrastructure from cyber attacks.
- Hillsborough law: A piece of legislation requiring public servants to be truthful during public inquiries.
- A bill allowing the Crown Estate to borrow from the government in order to invest in new infrastructure projects.
- The Football Governance Bill to establish a regulator for the top five tiers of English football.
- A bill to establish an Armed Forces Commissioner with powers to inspect faulty kit and equipment.
- The Courts and Tribunals Bill to restrict the use of jury trials, remove the automatic right of appeal from magistrates courts, and introduce a new criminal court.

Skills England is a new government agency that will be created by the Skills England Bill. The agency will increase flexibility within the skills training area, to properly cater for skills shortages within regional economies, and to ensure the UK trains its own workforce. Starmer launched a Child Poverty Taskforce, in which expert officials from across government would work together on how best to support more than four-million children living in poverty.

=== Domestic affairs ===
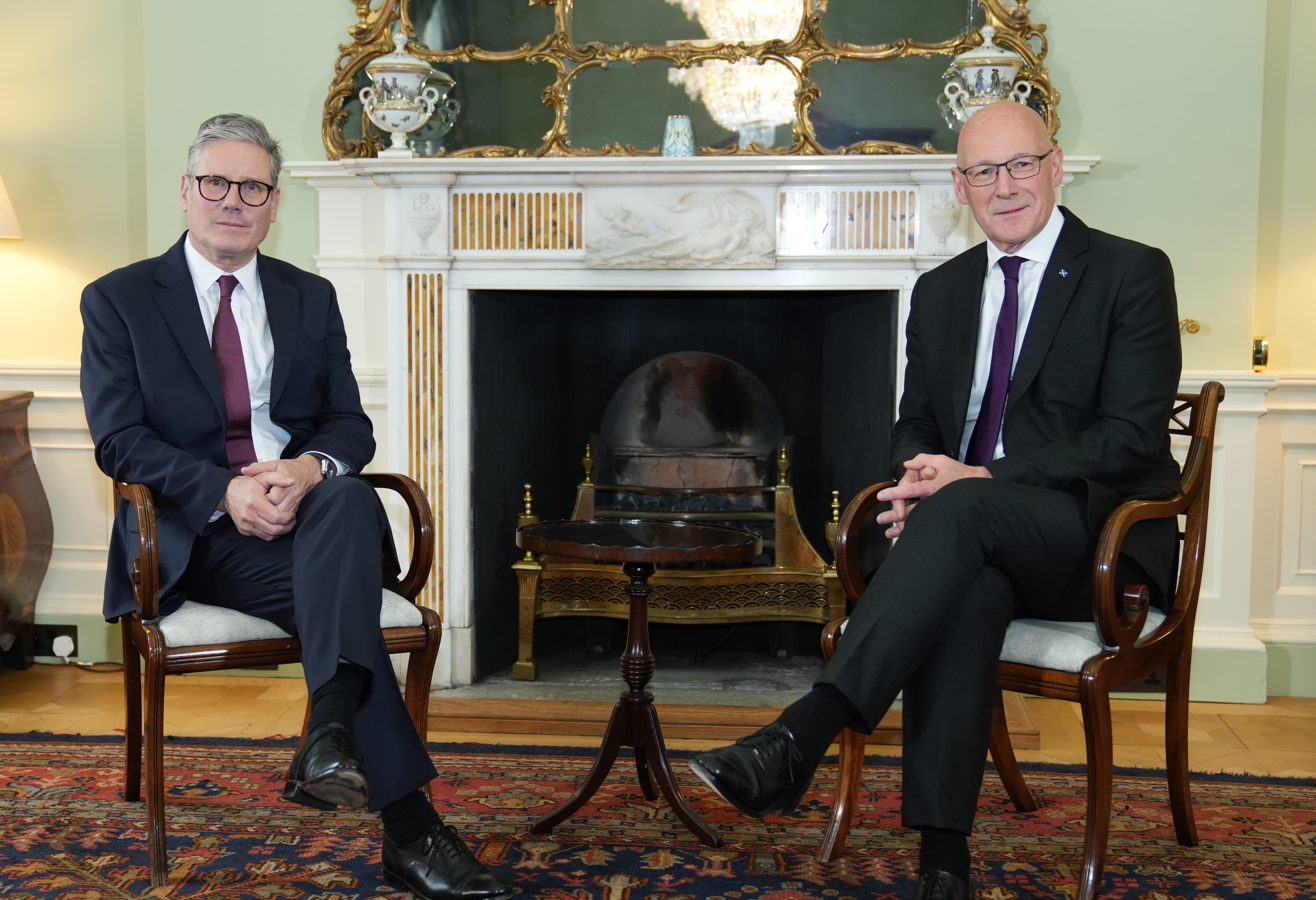
Starmer meets with Scottish First Minister John Swinney at Bute House

Starmer went on a tour of the four countries of the UK and met with the leader of Scottish Labour, Anas Sarwar, and also met with the first minister of Scotland, John Swinney, at Bute House. He also met with mayors including Andy Burnham and Khan. On 18 July 2024 Starmer chaired the 4th European Political Community Summit. On 24 July 2024 he attended his first Prime Minister's Questions.

==== Immigration ====
One of Starmer's first acts as prime minister was cancelling the controversial Rwanda asylum plan, claiming it to be "dead and buried." The home secretary, Yvette Cooper, set out the first steps towards establishing a Border Security Command, to tackle smuggling gangs which facilitate illegal migrant crossings over the English Channel. The command would be funded by money previously earmarked for the Rwanda plan and would be responsible for coordinating the activities of Immigration Enforcement, MI5, the Border Force and the National Crime Agency in tackling smuggling gangs which facilitate illegal migrant crossings over the English Channel. The new office of Border Security Commander was also established, whose remit would be to lead the new command and its members, with the government expecting the appointment of the first officeholder to be made in the coming weeks. A team in the Home Office was tasked with setting out the remit of the command, as well as its governance structure and its strategic direction.

In the year ending June 2025, total UK immigration was around 898,000, with non-EU nationals making up the majority (75%, or 670,000). This total included 143,000 British nationals and 85,000 EU nationals. In the year ending June 2025, total UK emigration was a provisional 693,000, with EU+ nationals and British nationals making up significant portions. More EU+ and British citizens left than arrived, contributing to net negative migration for these groups. For the year ending (YE) June 2025, the top three nationalities from non-EU+ countries immigrating on work-related visas were Indian, Pakistani, and Nigerian.

In May 2025, following Reform UK's electoral success at the local elections, Starmer gave a press conference where he promised a significant fall in net migration by the end of the parliament and unveiled plans to curb judges' powers to block deportations under the European Convention on Human Rights (ECHR). Starmer promised to reduce the number of migrants coming to the UK "significantly", by around 100,000 per year, stating: "Make no mistake, this plan means migration will fall. That is a promise." Starmer refused to commit to an annual cap or target as he argued such an approach would not be "sensible". Asked to give voters more than just a promise, he said: "We do want to significantly reduce migration. I am absolutely making clear that is what it will do and that if we need to go further, we will." He also cast doubt on any threat from Reform's electoral success, claiming: "I know on a day like today, people who like politics will try to make this all about politics, about this or that strategy, targeting these voters, responding to that party. No. I am doing this because it is right, because it is fair and because it is what I believe in." Starmer's line "we risk becoming an island of strangers" when discussing tighter immigration controls was criticised by media outlets and Labour backbencher Zarah Sultana as echoing Enoch Powell's "strangers in their own country" line from his "rivers of blood" speech. He was also criticised for using the phrase "take back control" five times, which had been used as Vote Leave's slogan during the 2016 European Union membership referendum. Farage accused Starmer of being "insincere" and warned he was "playing catch up" on the issue of immigration, stating "I was using take back control in 2004".

On 10 July 2025, Starmer announced that a new 'one in, one out' migrant deal with France would begin within weeks. In early September 2025, it was reported that 3,567 people had arrived on the UK's shores since the deal with France was ratified in August, however returns had not yet commenced. On 15 September 2025, the first "one in, one out" migrant flight, which was due to fly one migrant from London to Paris on an Air France flight, was cancelled due to protests from charities and threats of legal action. On 16 September 2025, deportation flights were cancelled again due to legal challenges and protests. Further that day, it was reported that a 25-year-old Eritrean asylum seeker who had arrived on a small boat on 12 August 2025 would not be deported as planned on 17 September, after he won his High Court bid to have the removal temporarily blocked.

==== Economy ====
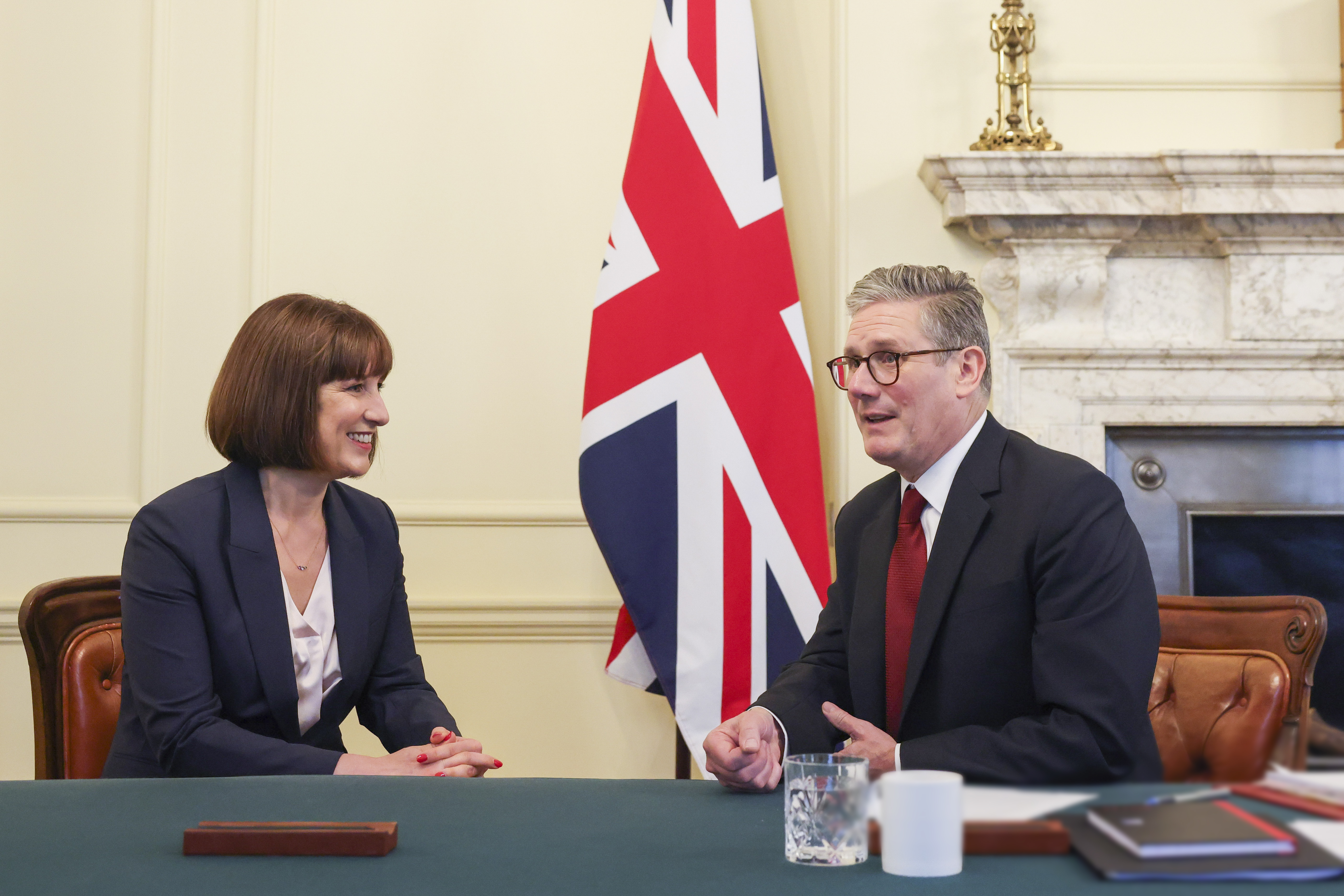
Starmer with his Chancellor, Rachel Reeves, 6 July 2024

Starmer has suggested that he favours green policies to tackle climate change and decarbonise the British economy. He has committed to eliminate fossil fuels from the UK electricity grid by 2030. In 2021 Starmer and Rachel Reeves pledged that a Labour government would invest an extra £28 billion per year in green industries; in June 2023 this was changed to £28 billion per year by the middle of their first term of government.

Since 2022 Reeves has adhered to "modern supply-side economics", an economic policy which focuses on infrastructure, education and labour supply by rejecting tax cuts and deregulation. In May 2023, Reeves coined the term "securonomics" to refer to her version of this economic policy, originally in a public address at the Peterson Institute for International Economics. It was heavily inspired by the economic policy of Joe Biden, the former president of the United States, particularly his Inflation Reduction Act.

Securonomics is based on the belief that globalisation has failed to achieve its stated aims and that economies in the Western world must adapt in response. Reeves suggested that the active state is part of an "emerging global consensus" which will replace the neoliberal economic consensus, and that economic policy must be driven by the need for security.

On taking office as Chancellor of the Exchequer, Reeves stated that since there is "not a huge amount of money" her focus will be on "unlocking" private-sector investment, as she believes "private-sector investment is the lifeblood of a successful economy." She made her first statement as Chancellor two days later, announcing measures she said were aimed to grow the economy. On 29 July 2024 Reeves conducted a spending review, arguing there was a need to make "necessary and urgent decisions" because of an "unfunded" and "undisclosed" overspending of £21.9 billion by the previous Conservative government. Among the decisions she made were to axe winter fuel payments for pensioners not receiving pension credit (roughly around 10 million people), which received widespread criticism. She also announced the cancellation of several infrastructure projects, and selling surplus public sector buildings and land. Reeves' first budget took place on 30 October 2024, which introduced the largest tax rises at a budget since March 1993 and is forecast to set the tax burden to its highest level in recorded history. Starmer and Reeves met with senior bondholders including Larry Fink on 21 November 2024.

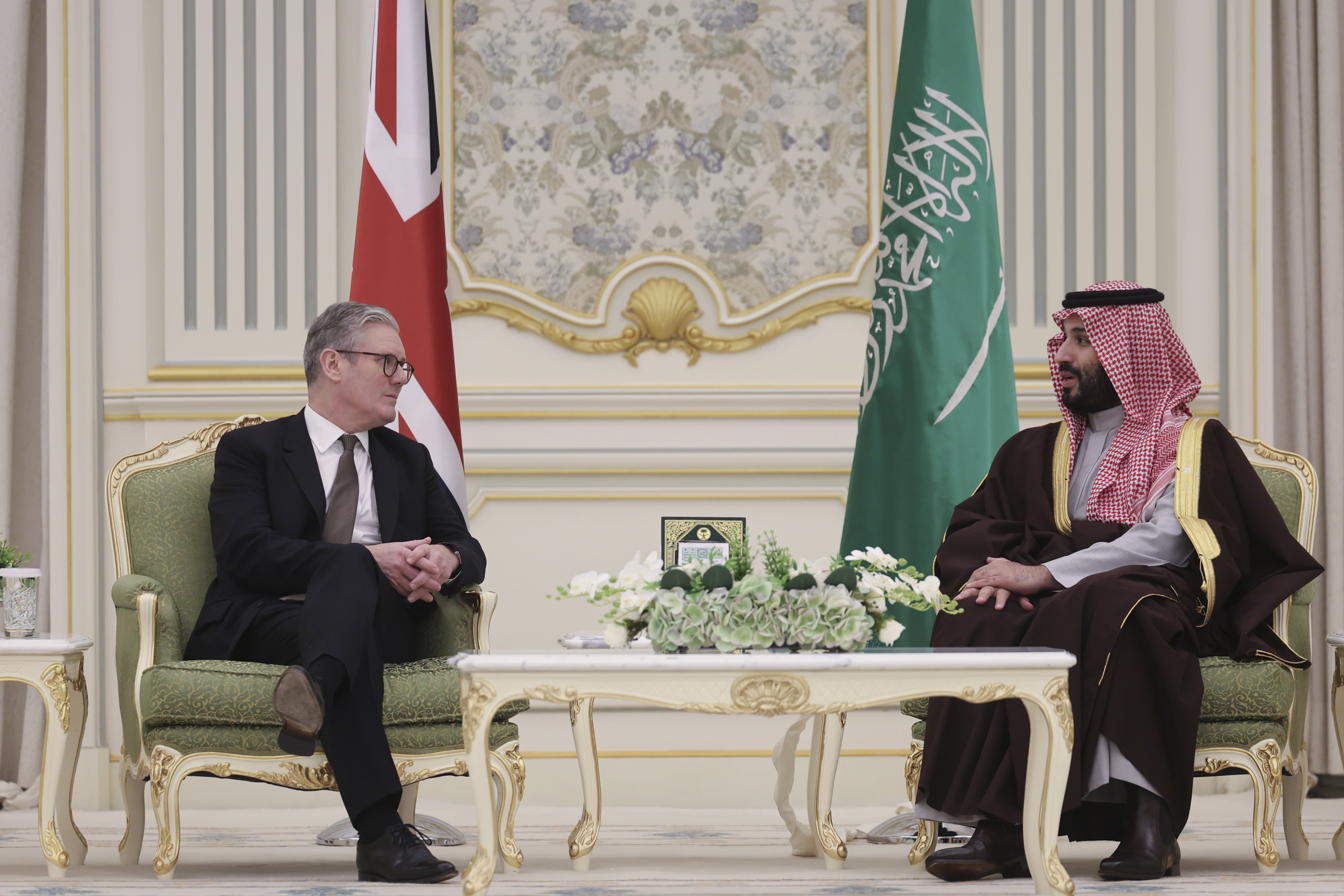
Starmer with Saudi Crown Prince Mohammed bin Salman in Riyadh, Saudi Arabia, December 2024

Starmer identified economic growth (or wealth creation) as his "number one mission" during his official visit to Saudi Arabia in December 2024.

In January 2025 Reeves announced plans for a new runway at Heathrow Airport as part of a push for "growth". Regulators were also asked to "tear down regulatory barriers" to promote economic growth. On 25 February 2025, Starmer announced plans to increase the defence budget to 2.5 per cent of the British gross domestic product (GDP) by 2027—paid for by cutting the UK's international aid budget to 0.3 per cent. Save the Children described the cuts as "a betrayal of the world's most vulnerable children and the UK's national interest".

In the second quarter GDP grew by 0.3% after 0.7% growth in the first quarter.

In April 2025 Starmer recalled Parliament from recess for a Saturday sitting to debate the Steel Industry (Special Measures) Bill, emergency legislation to prevent the closure of Scunthorpe Steelworks. The bill is seen as a first step towards the nationalisation of British Steel.

==== Budget ====
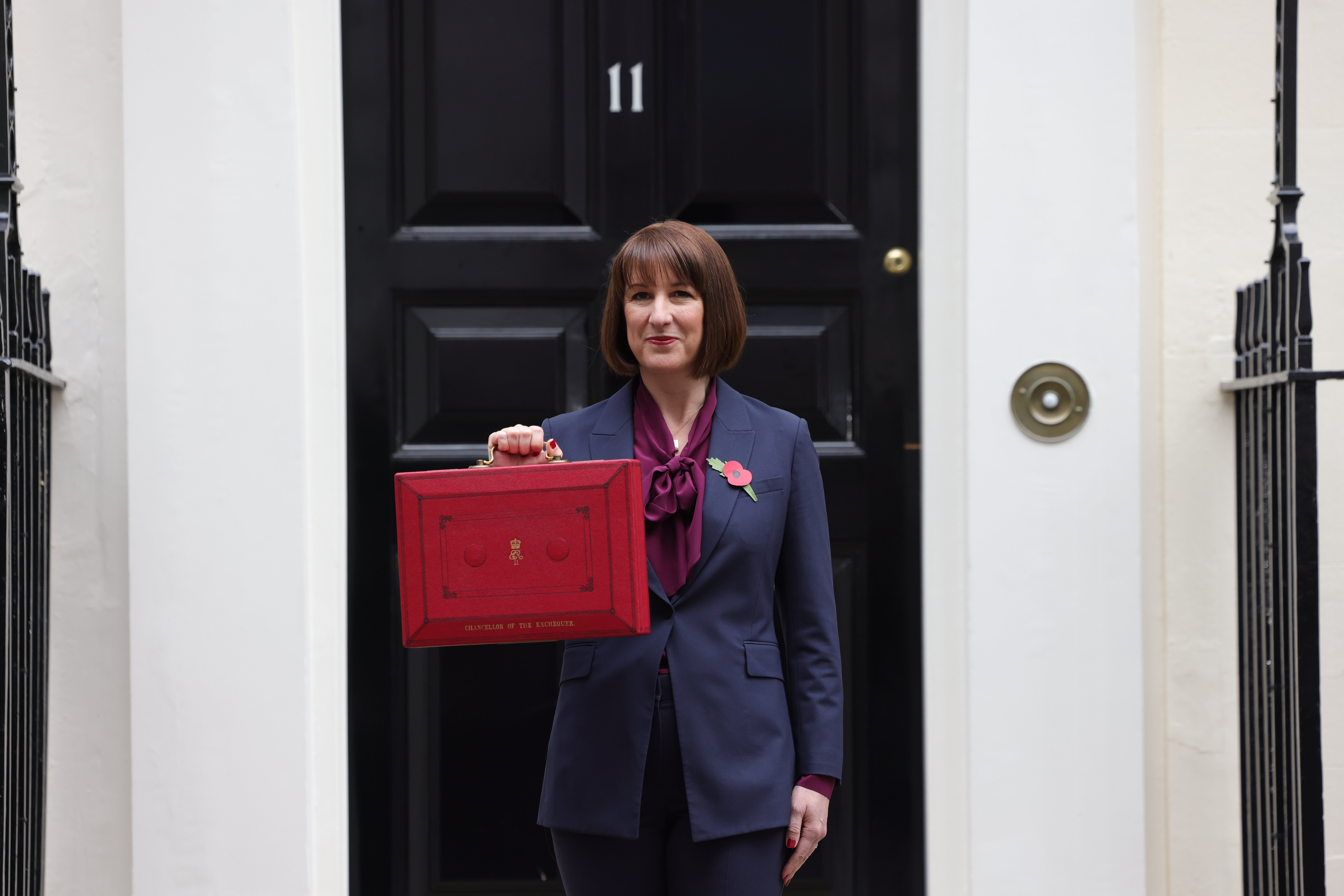
Reeves holding the red box

The October 2024 budget was presented by Reeves on 30 October 2024. In it she announced tax rises worth £40 billion, the biggest tax rise at a budget since March 1993. Amongst the measures she announced were an increase in employers' National Insurance to 15 per cent on salaries above £5,000 from April 2025, income tax thresholds to rise in-line with inflation after 2028, changes to farm inheritance tax meaning that the inheritance tax of 20 per cent would effectively apply to rural estates above the value of £1,000,000 from April 2026, and a rise in the single bus fare cap to £3 from January 2025. The forecast from the Office for Budget Responsibility (OBR) stated that the budget would mean the tax burden would be set to its highest ever level in recorded history. The director of the Institute for Fiscal Studies, Paul Johnson, accused Reeves of further undermining trust in politicians. Reeves later said that it was not a budget she would want to repeat, and accepted that the tax rises would likely hit wage growth for workers.

==== 2025 spring statement ====
The 2025 spring budget statement was delivered to the House of Commons by Reeves on 26 March 2025. There was emphasis on increasing defence spending. Major welfare announcements included restrictions on universal credit and its health-related element in particular, and eligibility for personal independence payments. The health-related element of universal credit will no longer be available to young people aged under 22. 10,000 Civil Service jobs are set to be cut. Late payment penalties related to VAT and self-assessed income tax liabilities will be increased from 6 April 2025: the new rates will be 3% of the tax outstanding where tax is overdue by 15 days, a further 3% where either tax is overdue by 30 days, and an additional 10% per annum where either tax is overdue by 31 days or more. The budget statement raised concerns that it could risk pushing up further Britain's $143 billion per annum in interest costs on government debt. The government is expected to spend £9.4 million on interest in the 2025 fiscal year than it did in the time up to the autumn budget in 2024.

==== Early release of prisoners ====
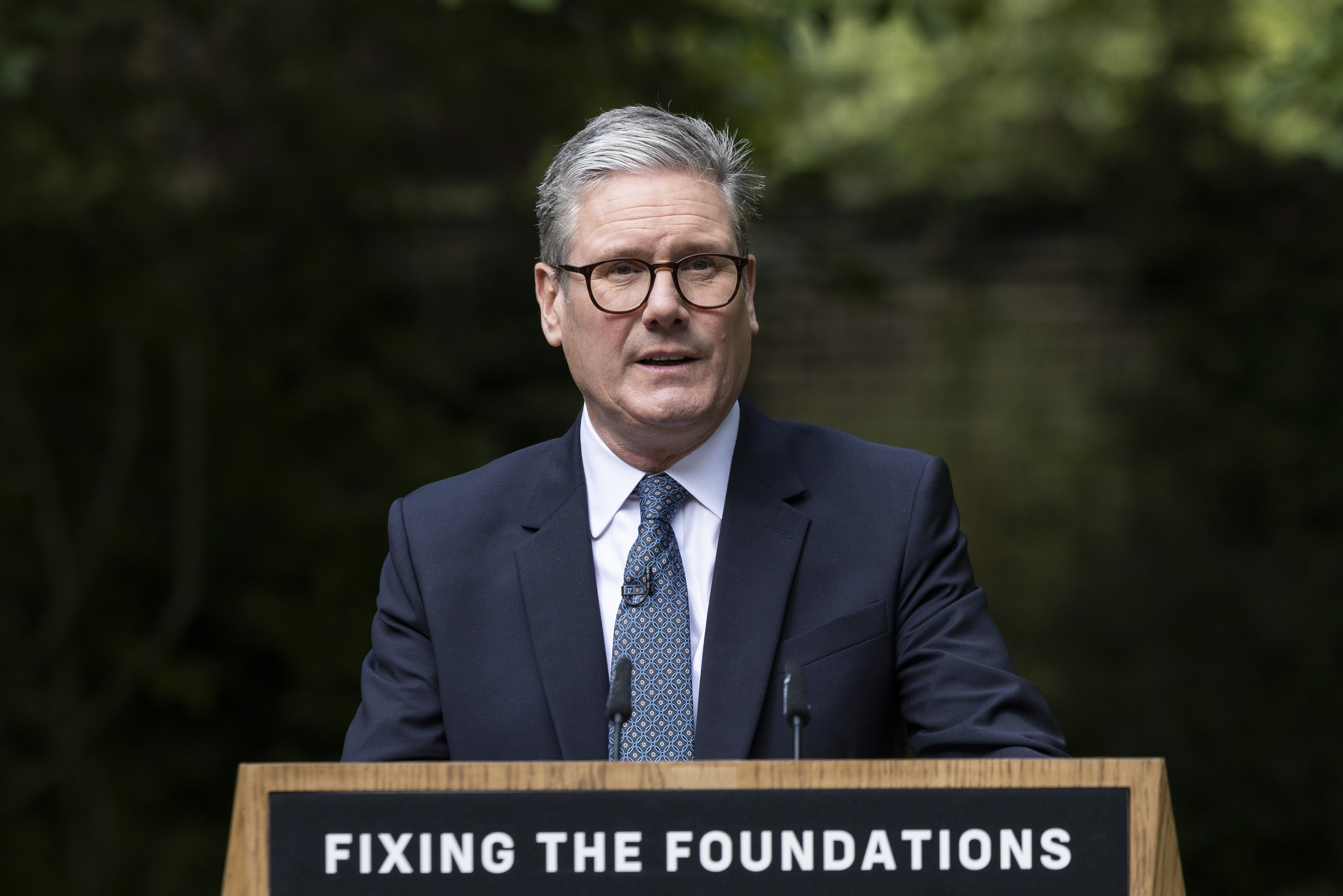
Starmer gives his Inheritance speech in the garden of 10 Downing Street, 27 August 2024

Shortly after taking office, Starmer said that there were "too many prisoners", and described the previous government as having acted with "almost beyond recklessness". In order to manage the prison overcrowding, his Justice Secretary, Shabana Mahmood, announced the implementation of an early release scheme which allowed for prisoners in England and Wales to be released after serving 40 per cent of their sentences rather than the 50 per cent previously introduced under the last government. Over 1,700 prisoners were released in September, with further releases expected in the following year. One prisoner released early under the scheme was charged with sexual assault relating to an alleged offence against a woman on the same day he was freed. Starmer has defended the releasing of prisoners, and accused the previous government of having "broke the prison system."

==== Tobacco and Vapes Bill ====
On 24 October 2024 the government announced a ban on the sale of single-use electronic cigarettes (vapes), effective from June 2025, in an effort to address environmental concerns and the rising prevalence of vaping amongst children. On 5 November 2024 the government introduced the Tobacco and Vapes Bill, aiming to protect public health and reduce the harm caused by smoking. The bill proposed measures to phase out tobacco sales for those under 15, extend the indoor smoking ban to outdoor areas and introduce stricter regulations on vaping, including a ban on vape advertising and limitations on flavours and packaging.

The bill was supported by health organisations, including Cancer Research UK, Action on Smoking and Health and Royal College of Paediatrics and Child Health. In a poll conducted by YouGov in August 2024, 61 per cent of UK adults supported the efforts to phase out smoking by banning it for people born after 1 January 2009, while 27 per cent opposed it. 81 per cent supported the banning of disposable vapes, while 13 per cent opposed it.

==== Assisted dying bill ====
Starmer is a longtime supporter of the campaign for assisted dying or doctor-assisted voluntary euthanasia in the UK. On 13 March 2024 he pledged to give MPs a vote on assisted suicide if Labour won the 2024 general election. He phoned the pro-assisted dying campaigner Esther Rantzen and said to her: "I'm personally in favour of changing the law. I think we need to make time. We will make the commitment. Esther, I can give you that commitment right now... For people who are going through this or are likely to go through it in the next few months or years, this matters hugely and delay just prolongs the agony."

In September 2024 Kim Leadbeater, the Labour MP for Spen Valley, was drawn first in the ballot for private members' bills. She announced on 3 October 2024 that she would introduce a bill on assisted dying, and on 16 October 2024 the Terminally Ill Adults (End of Life) Bill was introduced to the House of Commons. The full text of the bill (as presented for second reading) was published on 11 November 2024. Starmer acknowledged the vote for Leadbeater's bill as being "very important". Additionally, Starmer noted Parliament's future intentions to strengthen NHS care for all needs, "including end-of-life care".

==== Healthcare ====
In Government, Starmer reaffirmed the outgoing Conservative government's commitment of no new HIV cases in the United Kingdom by 2030. On 10 February 2025 Starmer, alongside the singer and HIV activist Beverley Knight and the Terrence Higgins Trust chief executive Richard Angell, recorded himself taking a rapid HIV home test. This made Starmer the first serving British prime minister and serving leader of a G7 nation to take a test on camera.

==== Law and order ====
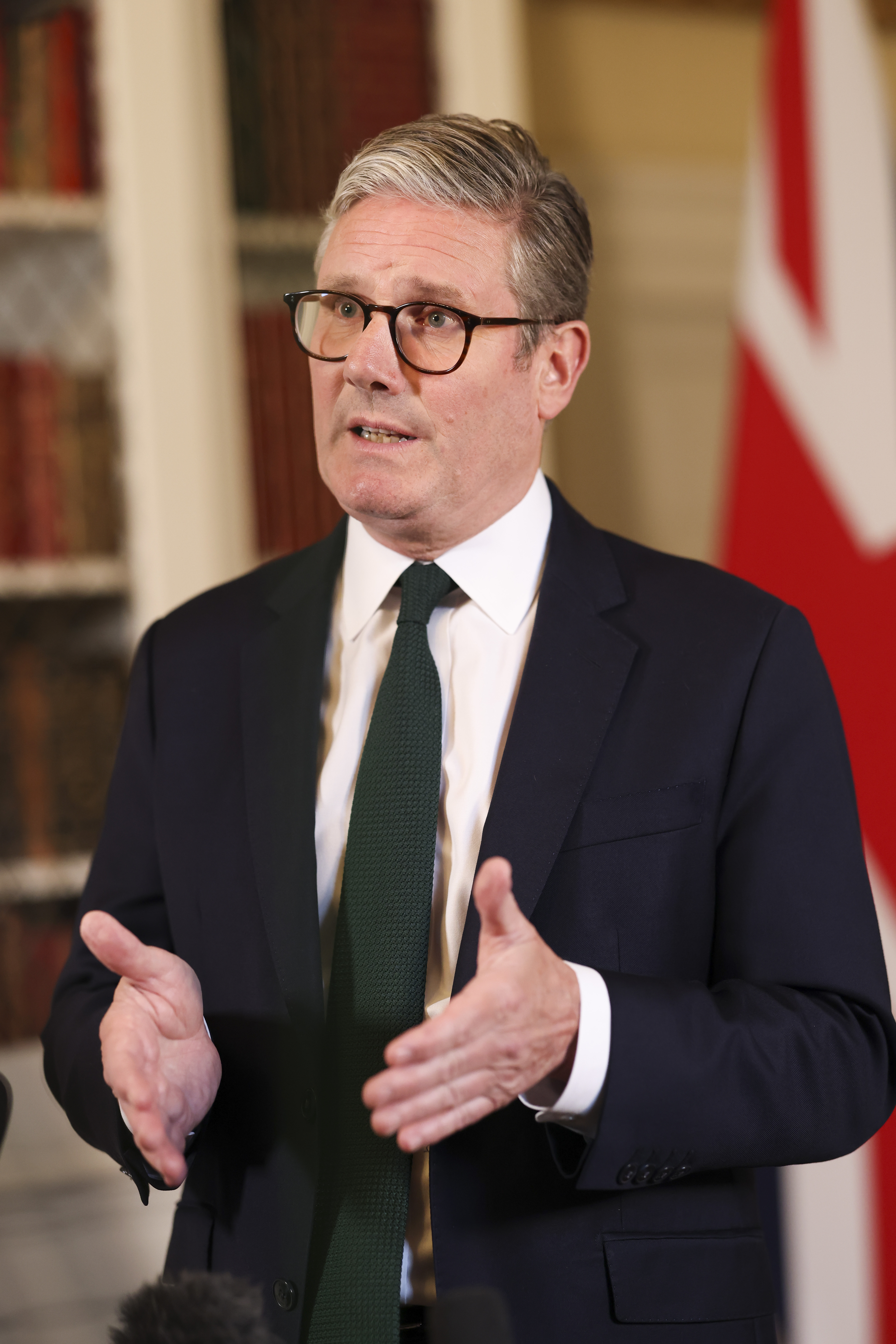
Starmer speaks to the media following an earlier Cobra meeting to discuss the violent disorder across the country, 6 August 2024

On 29 July 2024, following a mass stabbing occurred at a dance studio in Southport in which a 17-year-old boy named Axel Rudakubana killed three children and injured ten others – eight of whom were children at a Taylor Swift–themed yoga and dance workshop. Starmer described the murders as horrendous and shocking and thanked emergency services for their swift response. He later wrote amidst the riots across the country following the stabbing that those who had "hijacked the vigil for the victims" had "insulted the community as it grieves" and that rioters would feel the full force of the law. On 1 August, following a meeting with senior police officers, Starmer announced the establishment of the National Violent Disorder Programme to facilitate greater cooperation between police forces when dealing with violent disorder. On 4 August Starmer said that rioters "will feel the full force of the law" and told them "You will regret taking part in this, whether directly or those whipping up this action online and then running away themselves". He added "I won't shy away from calling it what it is – far-right thuggery". Starmer later called an emergency response meeting of Cobra. After the Cobra meeting he announced the establishment of a "standing army" of specialist police officers to address the violence, and help bring it to an end.

Starmer rejected calls from some MPs – including Labour MP Diane Abbott, Reform UK leader Nigel Farage and Conservative Priti Patel – to recall Parliament to Westminster. Farage condemned the violence as having "no place in a functioning democracy" but suggested "soft policing" during Black Lives Matter protests had contributed to a "sense of injustice" and an impression of "two-tier policing". Patel called Farage's comments deeply misleading and "simply not relevant". She said: "There's a clear difference between effectively blocking streets or roads being closed to burning down libraries, hotels, food banks and attacking places of worship. What we have seen is thuggery, violence, racism." Patel also wrote to the prime minister and home secretary, asking them to recall parliament. Following the 2024 UK riots, the Starmer government announced that it would be reviewing the Online Safety Act 2023 with the possibility of strengthening its provisions. Critics, including officials and stakeholders, characterized the legislation passed by the Conservatives as "not fit for purpose."

After Starmer said "large social media companies and those who run them" were contributing to the disorder, the American businessman and political figure Elon Musk, the owner of Twitter, criticised him for not condemning all participants in the riots and only blaming the far-right. Musk also responded to a tweet which said the riots were due to "mass migration and open borders" by tweeting, "Civil war is inevitable". His comments were condemned by Starmer's official spokesman. Musk further said Starmer was responsible for a "two-tier" policing system which did not protect all communities in the United Kingdom, and subsequently shared a conspiracy theory that Starmer's government was planning to build detainment camps in the Falkland Islands to hold far-right rioters. In response, Starmer said: "my focus is on ensuring our communities are safe. That is my sole focus. I think it's very important for us all to support the police in what they're doing".

After Rudakubana's guilty plea on 20 January 2025, Cooper announced a public inquiry, stating that the victims' families "needed answers about what had happened leading up to the attack". This was followed by Starmer's promise to overhaul terrorism laws to reflect the type of non-ideological killings characterised by individuals like Rudakubana, stressing the threat from "acts of extreme violence perpetrated by loners, misfits, young men in their bedroom, accessing all manner of material online, desperate for notoriety, sometimes inspired by traditional terrorist groups, but fixated on that extreme violence, seemingly for its own sake". Significant attention was drawn to Prevent for failing to accept referrals of Rudakubana on the basis of him lacking a terrorist ideology. Although an emergency review found that Prevent had followed correct procedures on each referral, Cooper concluded "that too much weight was placed on the absence of ideology" in the programme. Cooper announced that there would be a review on the threshold at which Prevent intervenes, with the senior lawyer David Anderson being assigned by Starmer as the Independent Prevent Commissioner to perform the review.

==== Railways ====
On 25 May 2025, Labour's renationalisation of the UK's railways began as the train operator South Western Railway was taken into public ownership.

Passenger train operators continue to be renationalised, with services to be managed at some future time by Great British Railways. As of October 2025, c2c (on 20 July 2025) and Greater Anglia (on 12 October 2025) have also been taken into public ownership.

Seven operators remain in the private sector: Avanti West Coast, Chiltern Railways, CrossCountry, East Midlands Railway, Govia Thameslink Railway, Great Western Railway and West Midlands Trains. West Midlands Trains is expected to be the next operator to be taken back into public ownership in February 2026, and all seven are expected to have been taken into public ownership by 2027.

=== Parliamentary business ===
Following the general election, chairs and member of select committees were due to be appointed. The House of Commons allocated which parties held each chair in advance of the summer recess on 30 July 2024. Nominations for Chairs and memberships ran until 9 September, and ballots took place on 11 September.

=== Defence ===
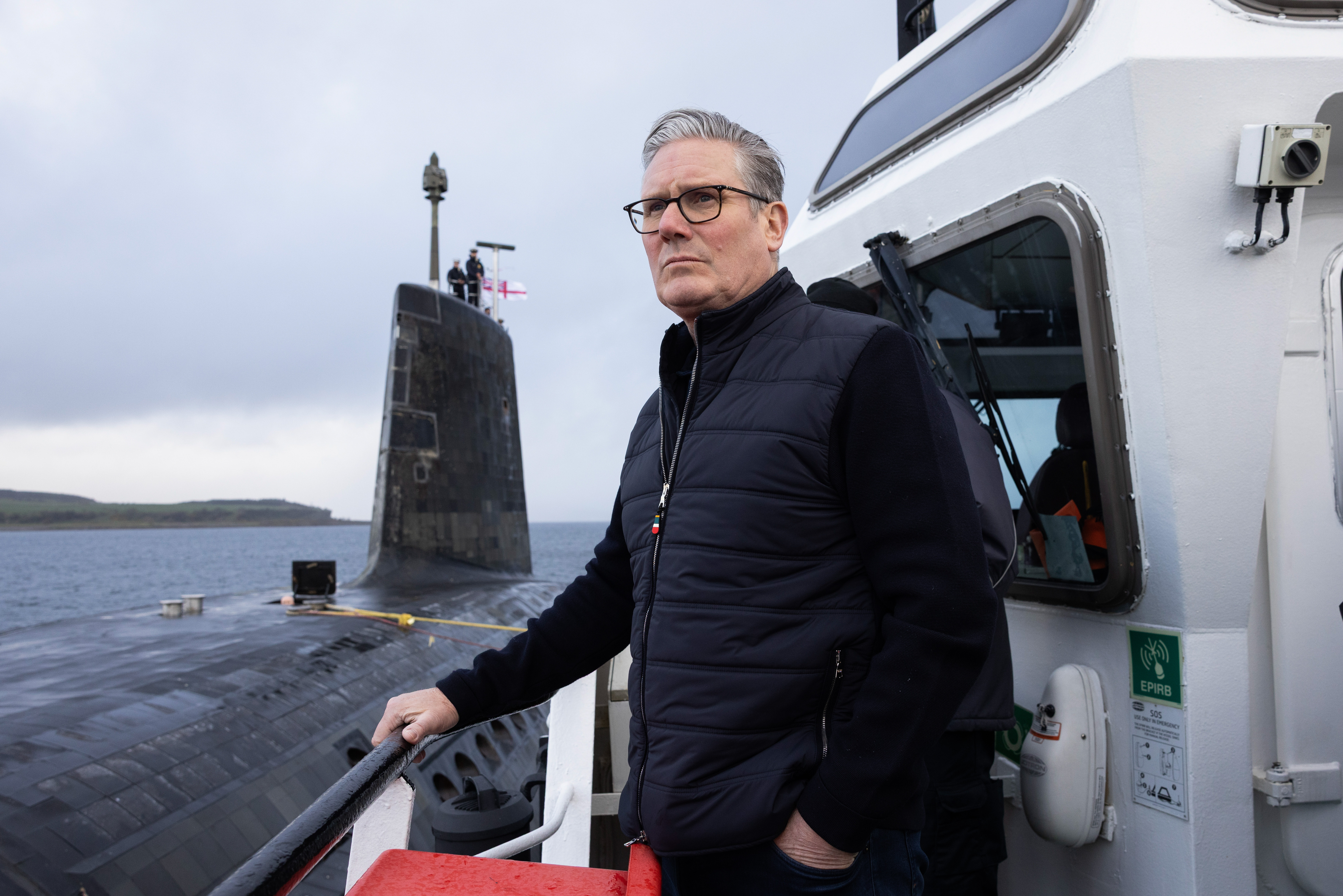
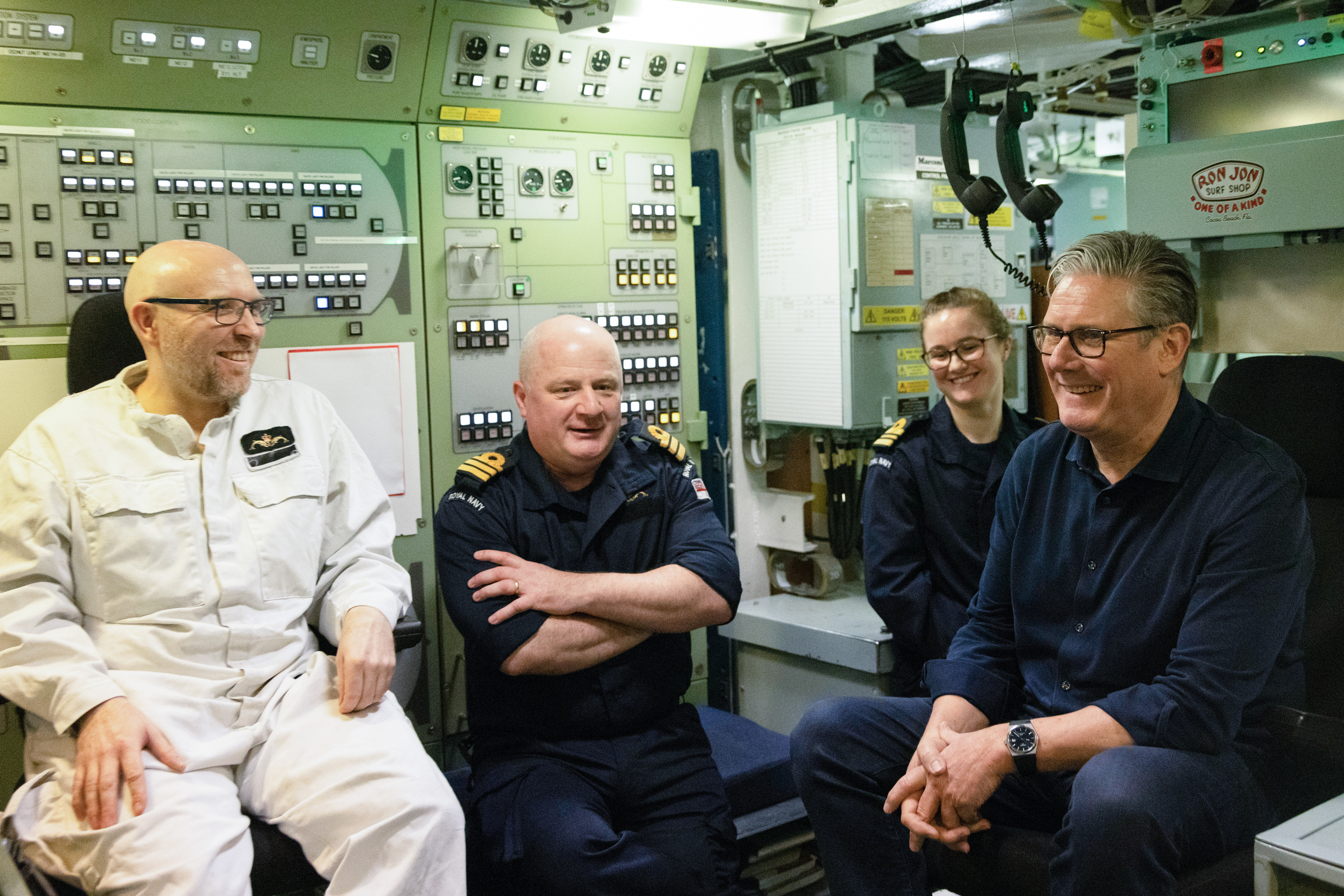
Starmer visiting a Vanguard-class submarine which provide Britain's nuclear deterrent

In general, Starmer continued the policies of the previous Conservative government, with promises to increase national security spending aiming to keep the US in NATO, act as a bridge between the US and Europe, and to support Ukraine in the Russo-Ukrainian war. He has generally supported the existing orthodoxy of Britain's defence establishment including continuing the expensive renewal of UK's ageing nuclear weapons capabilities, with the costs of the entire Defence Nuclear Enterprise expected to increase to between 20% and 25% of the overall Ministry of Defence budget in coming years.

In the first days of the administration, the government announced it would follow a NATO-first defence strategy with an absolute priority to Britain's nuclear deterrent alongside prioritising European security. In October 2024, Germany and Britain, Europe's two largest defence spenders, agreed the Trinity House Agreement to strengthen bilateral security cooperation and encourage joint defence development and procurement projects.

On 25 February 2025, Starmer announced that the previous government's commitment to reaching 2.5% of GDP spending on defence by 2030 would be brought forward to April 2027. This would be funded by reducing the official development assistance budget from 0.5% to 0.3%, transferring £6.1 billion annually to defence. George Robertson, a former Secretary General of NATO and Labour politician, led the 2025 Strategic Defence Review to guide the future increased spending, with Starmer commenting that the UK was moving to "war-fighting readiness" and that "everything we do will add to the strength of NATO".

In June 2025, Starmer announced the purchase of F-35A aircraft capable of deploying US nuclear weapons as part of NATO's dual capable aircraft nuclear mission, which his office said would be "the biggest strengthening of the UK's nuclear posture in a generation". The Royal Air Force stated that it would reintroduce a RAF nuclear role for the first time since the UK retired nuclear bombs after the end of the Cold War, and allows them to contribute to the NATO nuclear burden-sharing arrangement.

The Defence Investment Plan to implement the review was expected to be issued in autumn 2025. However this was delayed amid warnings that there was a £28 billion funding gap. In June 2026, The Times reported that the delay was due to the Ministry of Defence identifying nine months after the review that it needed the extra £28 billion over the next four years because of shortfalls in its ability to meet previous commitments. The Public Accounts Committee reported that the delay was undermining the UK's credibility with NATO allies and confidence within the defence industrial base. On 11 June 2026, just before the planned Defence Investment Plan publication, Defence Secretary John Healey and his junior minister Al Carns resigned citing disagreement with the very limited spending increase given in the plan beyond the 2.5% of GDP already committed to.

The Defence Investment Plan was announced by Starmer on 30 June 2026, after he had announced his resignation as prime minister and Leader of the Labour Party. The plan increased spending by about £1.5 billion over the previous draft, though funding for all the spending was not initially allocated. The Treasury had not carried out the analysis of how to reach the 3.5% of GDP NATO national security spending promise, and this would be a matter for the next prime minister.

=== Foreign affairs ===
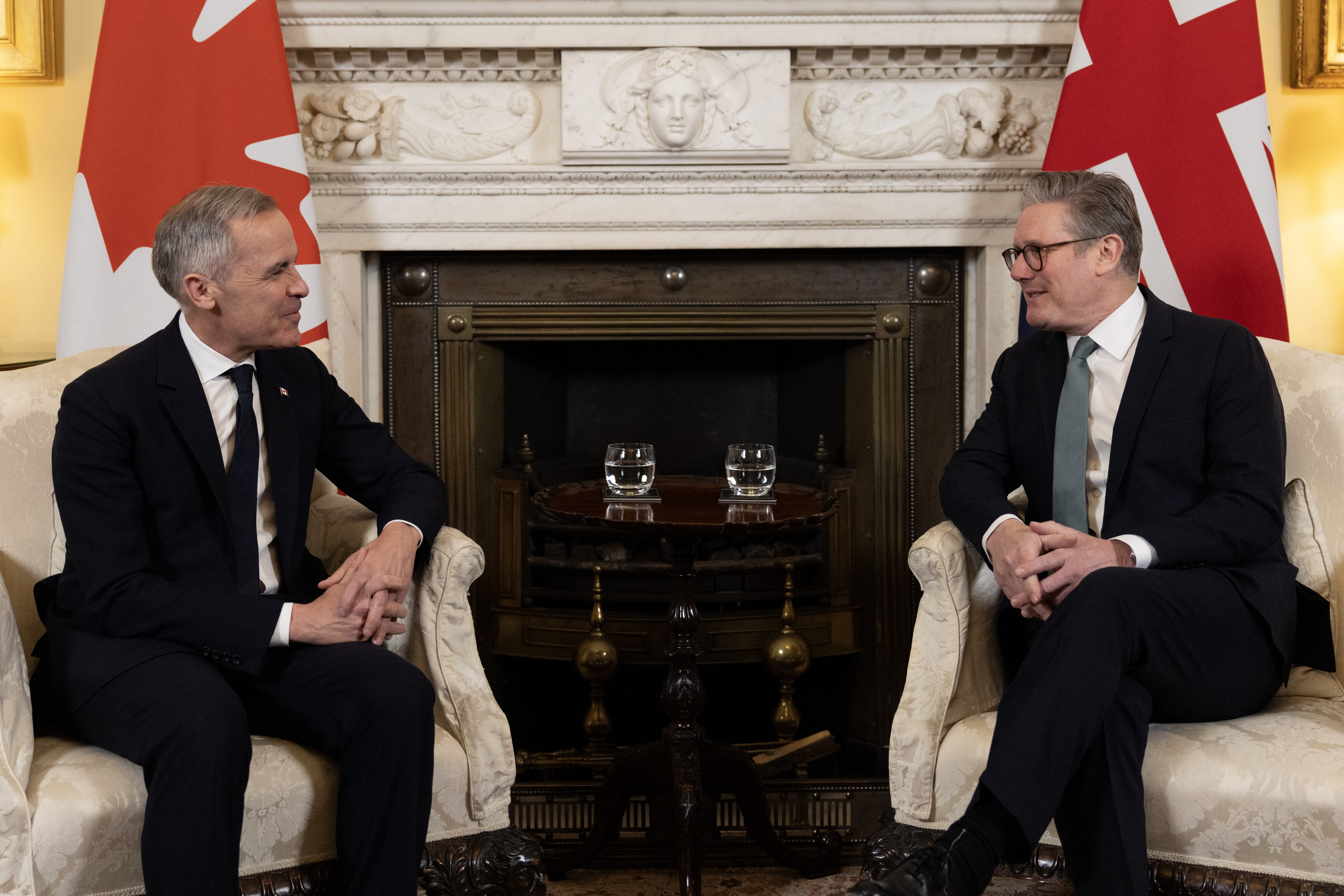
Starmer meets with Canadian Prime Minister Mark Carney, March 2025

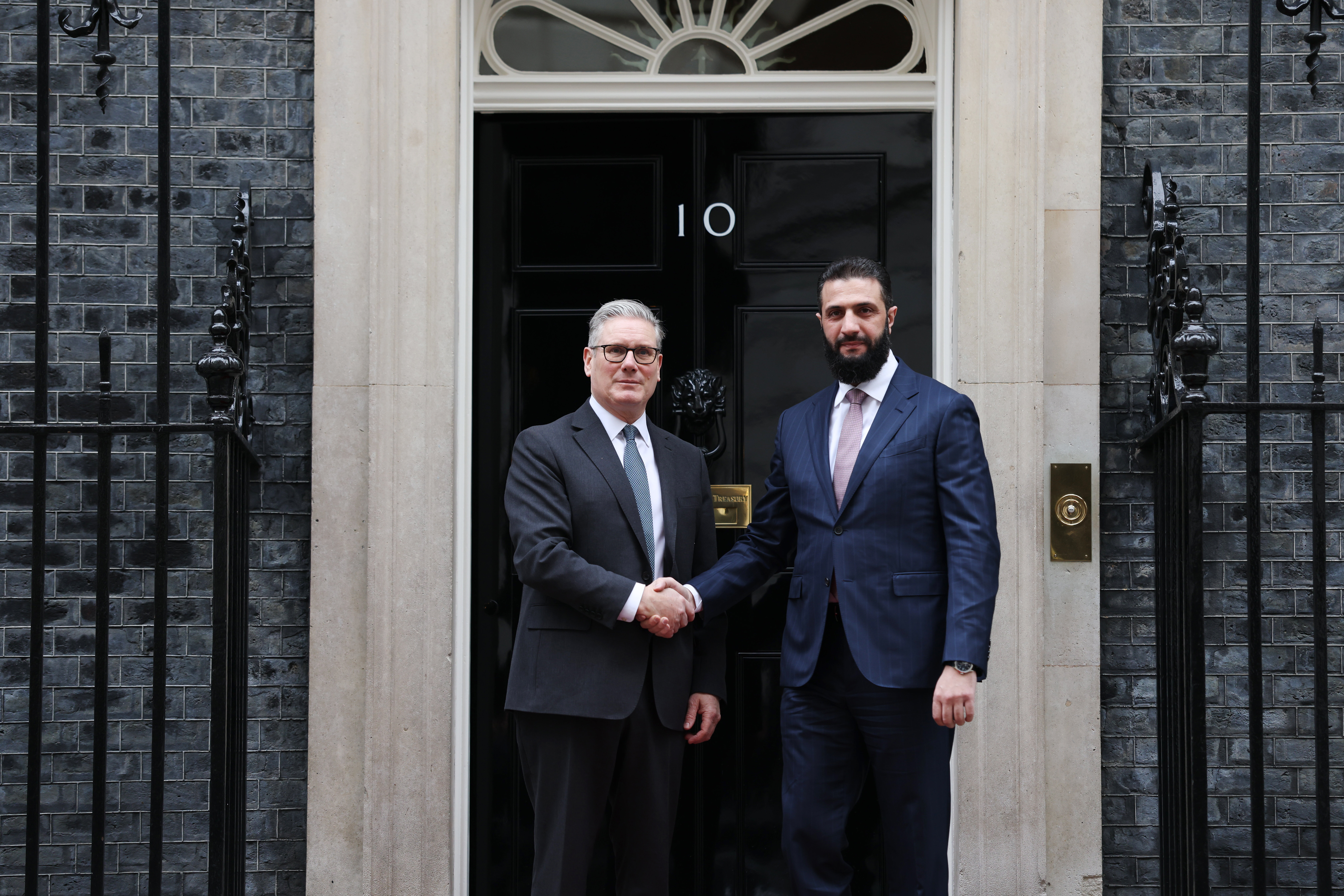
Starmer with Syrian President Ahmed al-Sharaa at 10 Downing Street, 31 March 2026

The first foreign meeting that Starmer attended as prime minister was the 2024 NATO summit. On the flight to the summit, he laid out a "cast iron" commitment to increase defence spending to 2.5 per cent of GDP, following a "root and branch" review of the UK's defences. In July 2024 Starmer and Joe Biden discussed their shared commitment to the Special Relationship and mutual support of Ukraine. Biden also congratulated Starmer on "a hell of a victory".

Shortly after taking office in July 2024, Starmer assured Benjamin Netanyahu that the UK remained committed to its "vital cooperation" with Israel to "deter malign threats".

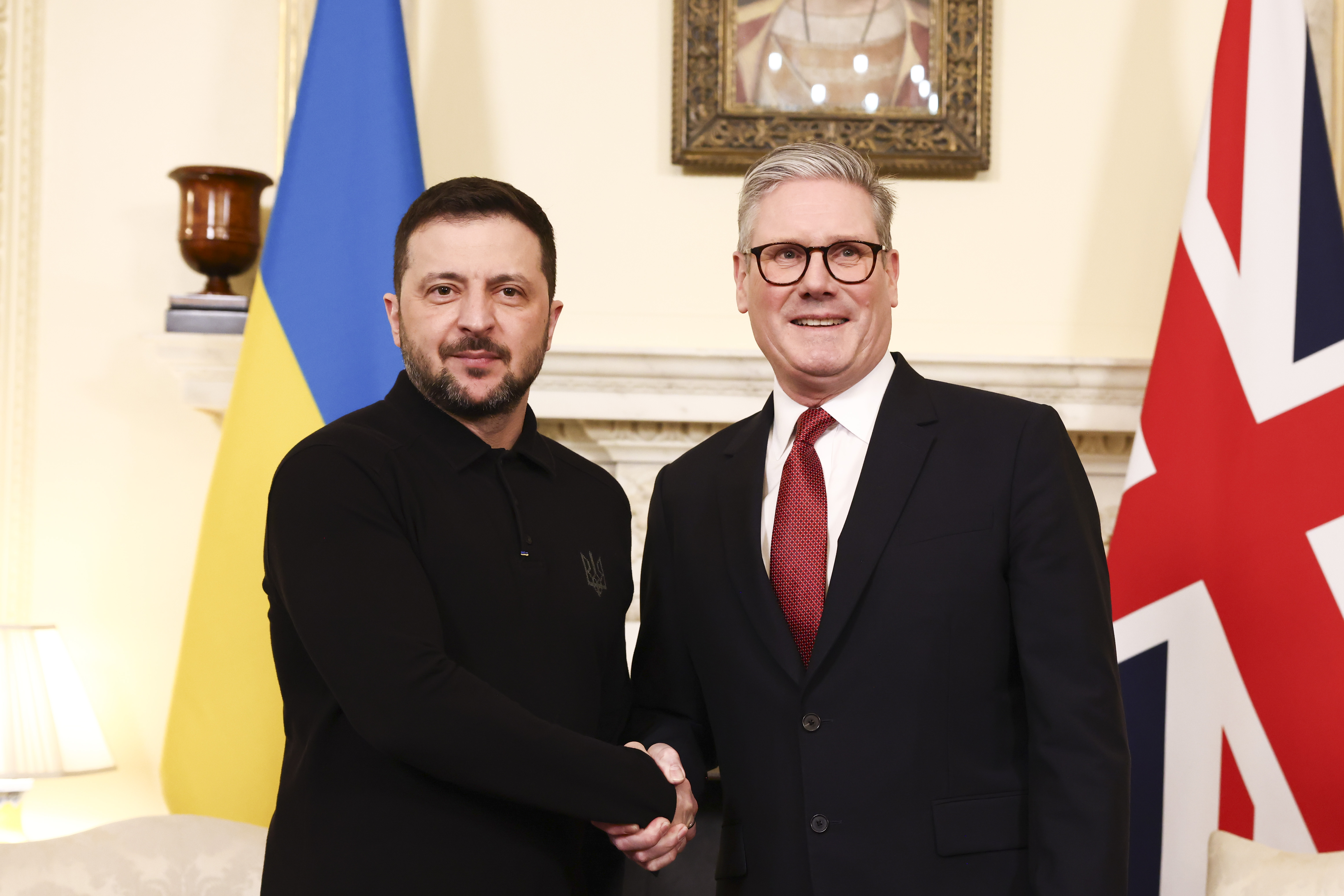
Starmer with Ukraine President Volodymyr Zelenskyy, February 2025

At the 2024 NATO summit, Starmer signalled that Ukraine could use Britain's Storm Shadow missile donations to strike military targets inside Russia. In a meeting with Zelenskyy, Starmer called for an "irreversible" membership strategy for Ukraine to join NATO.

Starmer's government has significantly expanded economic and military ties with Gulf Cooperation Council (GCC) nations, primarily focusing on securing infrastructure investment and finalizing a region-wide free trade agreement. Starmer defended the engagement with these leaders—despite human rights concerns—as necessary for both British security and jobs. In early December 2024, Starmer conducted a multi-day diplomatic visit to the Gulf, meeting with Sheikh Mohamed bin Zayed Al Nahyan in the UAE and Crown Prince Mohammed bin Salman in Saudi Arabia.

In May 2025, the UK and India agreed a trade deal to make it cheaper and easier to buy and sell goods and services to one another. Starmer described this as the UK's best trade deal since Brexit. Starmer faced questions regarding India's continued purchase of Russian fossil fuels, saying he respected India's "strategic independence".

Later in May, the UK and the EU agreed on a deal in London to 'reset' relations between them following Brexit. The deal included provisions on defence, fishing rights and youth mobility.

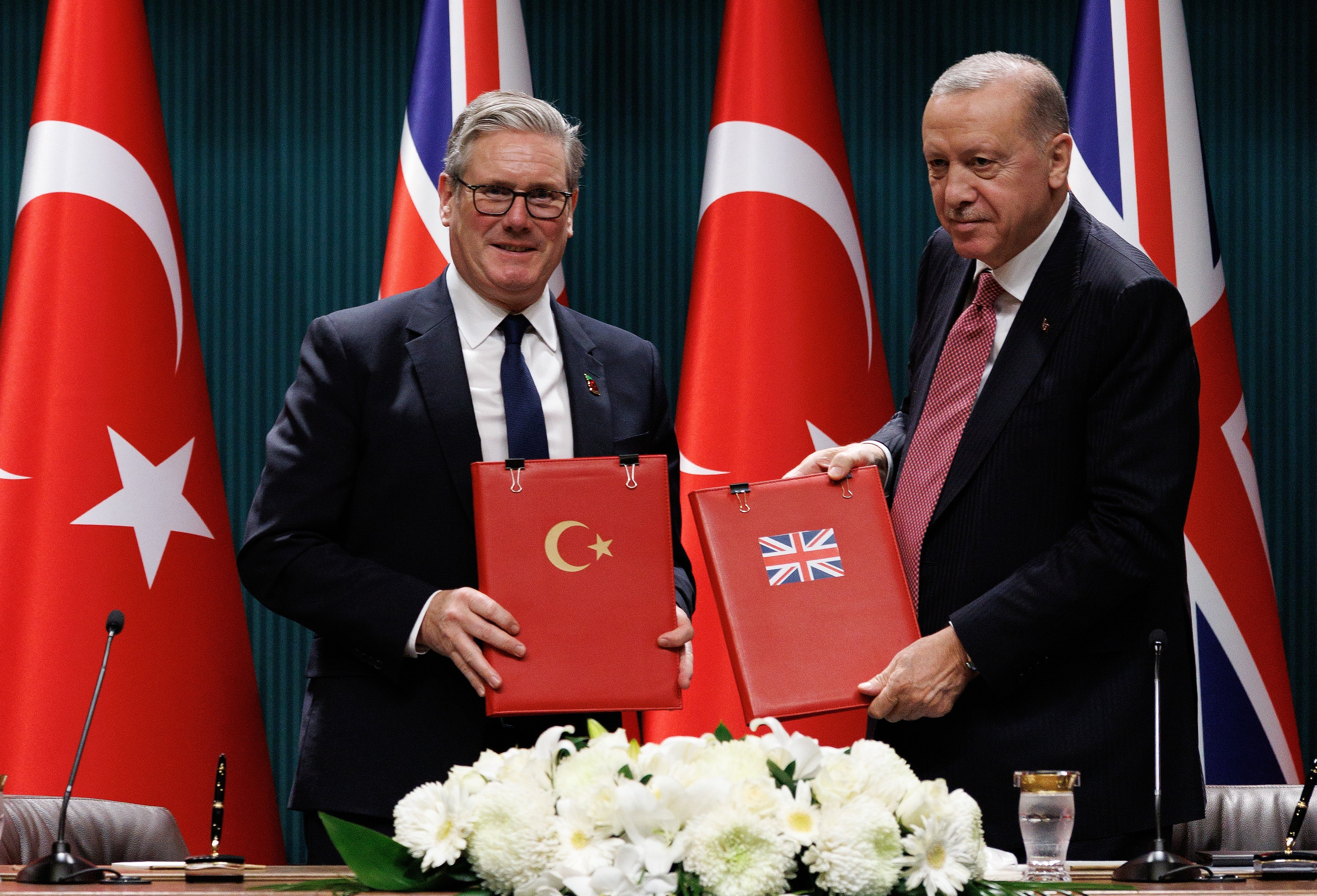
Starmer with Turkish President Recep Tayyip Erdoğan in Ankara, Turkey, October 2025

In late 2025, Starmer's government faced intensifying parliamentary and public pressure to suspend arms sales to the United Arab Emirates following reports that British-made military equipment was being diverted to the Rapid Support Forces (RSF) in Sudan. In October 2025, a United Nations Security Council investigation found that British military equipment had been deployed by the RSF during their siege and subsequent capture of El Fasher, North Darfur. The fall of the city followed an 18-month siege and immediately resulted in a large-scale massacre of civilians, characterized by humanitarian experts as one of the worst war crimes of the Sudanese civil war. Foreign Secretary Yvette Cooper has declined to commit to halting British arms exports to the UAE, instead focusing on diplomatic pressure and humanitarian aid.

In October 2025, Starmer finalized a landmark defence agreement with Turkey for the sale of 20 Eurofighter Typhoon fighter jets, valued at approximately £8 billion ($10.7 billion).

==== Iran ====
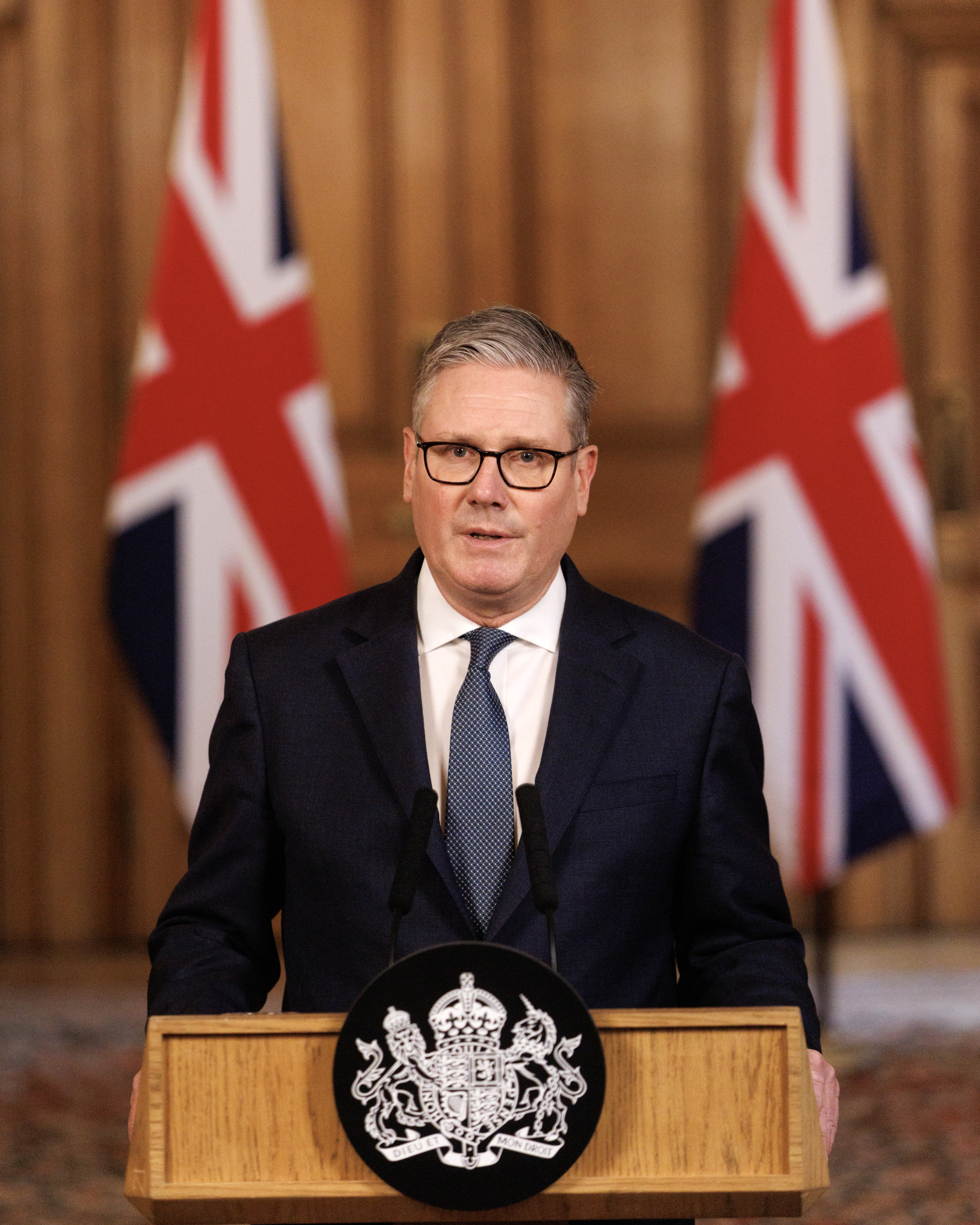
Starmer speaking on the outbreak of the Iran War, 28 February 2026

Following the Israeli strikes on Iran in June 2025, Starmer said the UK had "long held concerns" about Iran's nuclear programme, and that he "absolutely recognize[s] Israel's right to self-defence." At the same time, he stressed the need for "de-escalation." Starmer reiterated those messages during a phone call with Israeli prime minister Netanyahu.

On 9 January 2026, Starmer, along with French president Emmanuel Macron and German chancellor Friedrich Merz, issued a joint statement addressing the escalating anti-government protests in Iran, which had started in late December 2025. In their statement, they called on the Iranian authorities to exercise restraint and to avoid further violence.

On 28 February 2026, Starmer declined to join the 2026 Iran war, due to concerns over international law and the need to avoid repeating the strategic mistakes of the Iraq War. By 1 March, he authorised the US to use British bases for "limited and specific" defensive strikes following a drone attack on RAF Akrotiri.

On 1 March, Starmer granted a US request to use UK bases for "defensive" strikes on Iranian capabilities; however, his initial refusal created a rift with Trump. The UK was also criticised by Cypriot officials for failing to warn or prevent the drone attack. Domestic opposition parties criticised Starmer. The leaders of the Conservative Party and Reform UK called Starmer indecisive and insufficiently supportive of the United States, while the Liberal Democrats' leader warned against further involvement in the region, and the Green Party leader called for an end of UK support for Israel.

==== United States ====
Following the attempted assassination of Donald Trump in Pennsylvania, Starmer tweeted "Political violence in any form has no place in our societies" and offered Donald Trump and his family his best wishes. He later deflected allegations from the Trump campaign that Labour had undertaken unlawful electoral interference by providing support to Kamala Harris' campaign, and had a meeting with Trump during the 79th session of the UN general assembly in New York.

In November 2024, Starmer offered his congratulations to Trump on a phone call after he won the 2024 United States presidential election, along with other world leaders, saying "I look forward to working with you in the years ahead. I know that the UK-US special relationship will continue to prosper on both sides of the Atlantic for years to come." Starmer also congratulated Trump on his victory in his first Prime Minister's Questions since the election result.

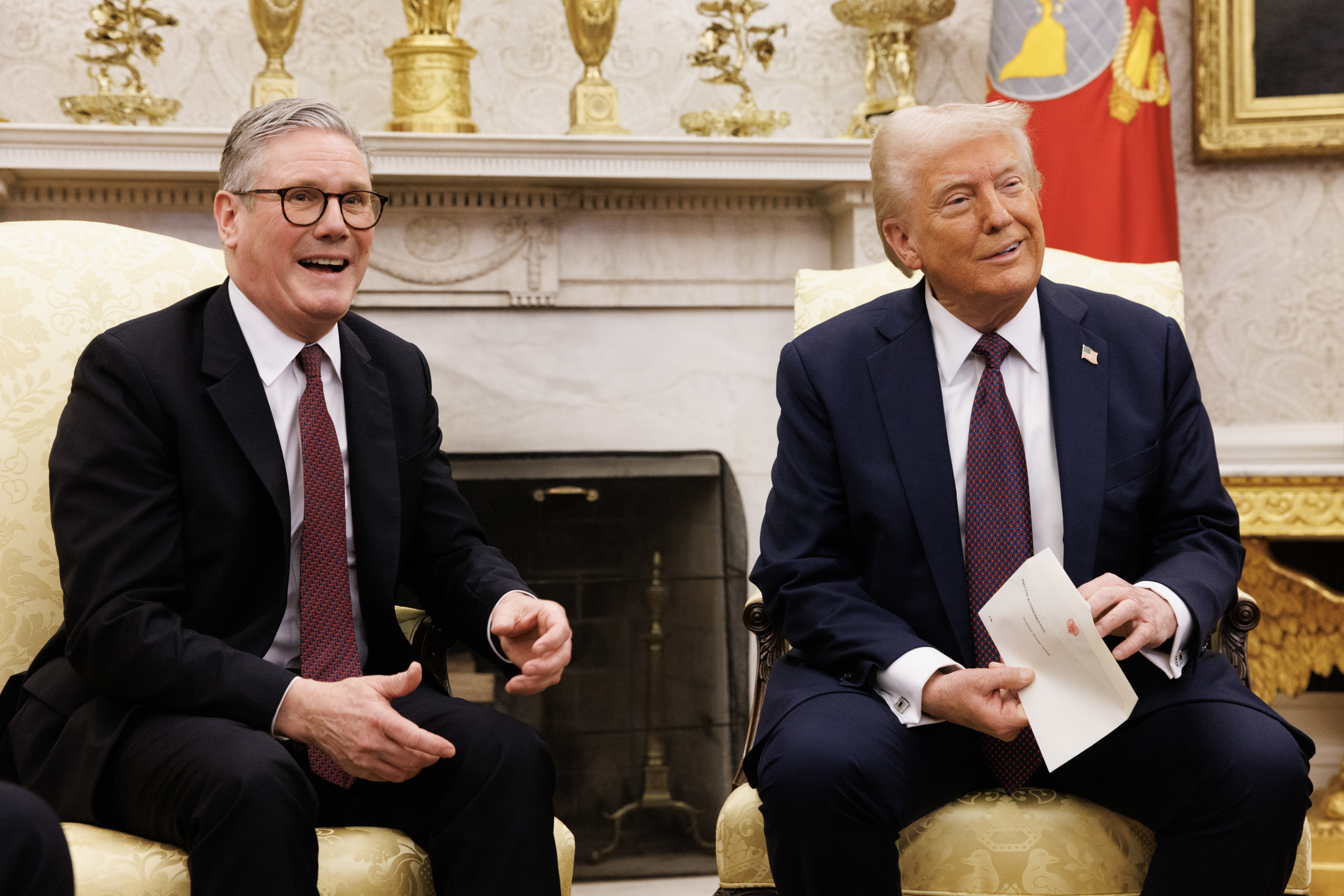
Starmer with US President Donald Trump at the White House, February 2025

Following Trump's second inauguration, Starmer met Trump at the White House in February 2025, and upon arrival presented to Trump an invitation letter from King Charles III for an 'unprecedented' second state visit for a US president. Trump endorsed the Starmer government's proposed deal to relinquish the British Indian Ocean Territory to Mauritius by ceding sovereignty of the Chagos Islands, in exchange for a 99-year lease of Diego Garcia – including the UK-US military base. Starmer and Trump agreed to work towards a trade deal. Trump avoided Starmer's primary request of committing to a US backstop in any security guarantees for Ukraine. Starmer toured the Washington offices of Palantir Technologies, he spoke to Chief Executive Officer Alex Karp and was shown some of the company's defence-related AI technology.

Starmer's office confirmed that the United Kingdom provided support for United States strikes in Yemen in March 2025 through "routine allied air-to-air refuelling".

===== Trump import tariffs =====
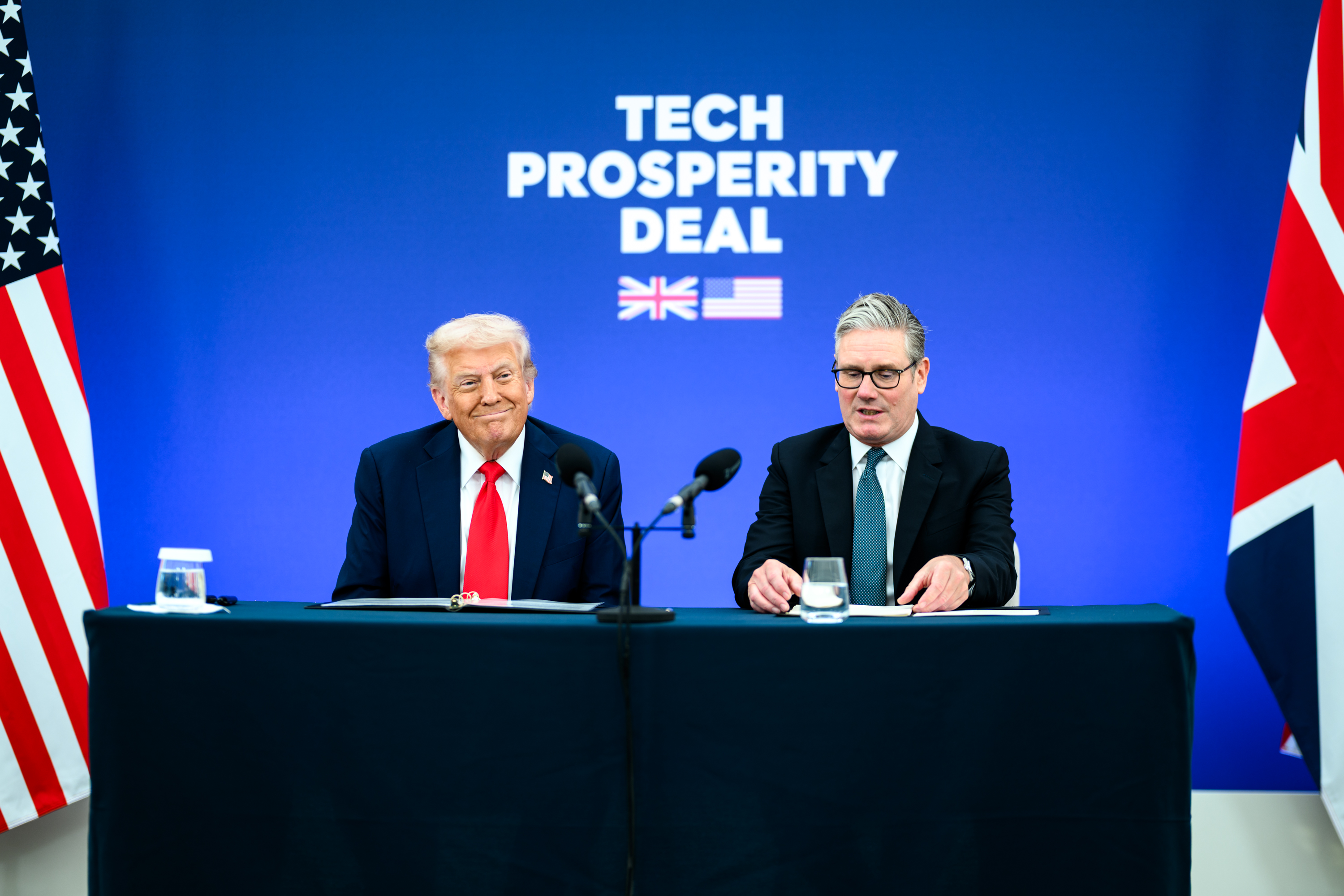
Starmer and Trump in Buckinghamshire, England, 18 September 2025

In April 2025, Trump announced a number of tariffs on foreign imports into the United States. English products were affected by a 10 per cent tariff. Starmer said that he planned on negotiating for a trade deal with the United States and that he did not want his country to be in a trade war. The United Kingdom chose not to retaliate against President Trump's metal tariffs.

Reeves stated that discussions were "ongoing" regarding a potential reduction of the UK's Digital Services Tax (DST) to prevent further trade disputes with the United States. Introduced in 2020, the UK's DST imposes a 2% levy on large digital companies, generating approximately £800 million annually. The proposal to reduce the tax faced criticism from the Liberal Democrats, who condemned it as a "tax handout to Elon Musk, Mark Zuckerberg, and other US tech barons" and instead advocated for an increase to 6%.

On 3 April 2025, the UK government published a 417-page list, which asked British businesses to point to products where tariffs would hurt British companies the least.

On 15 April 2025, Vice President JD Vance stated that there was a "'Good chance" of a US-UK trade deal to be signed.

In May 2025, Starmer agreed on a 'tariff deal' with the US which reduced the import tax on cars, from 25% to 10% and the 25% tariff on steel and aluminium were scrapped. Under this deal, the 20% tariff on US beef exports to the UK was also scrapped and the quota was raised by 12,000 metric tonnes.

==== China ====
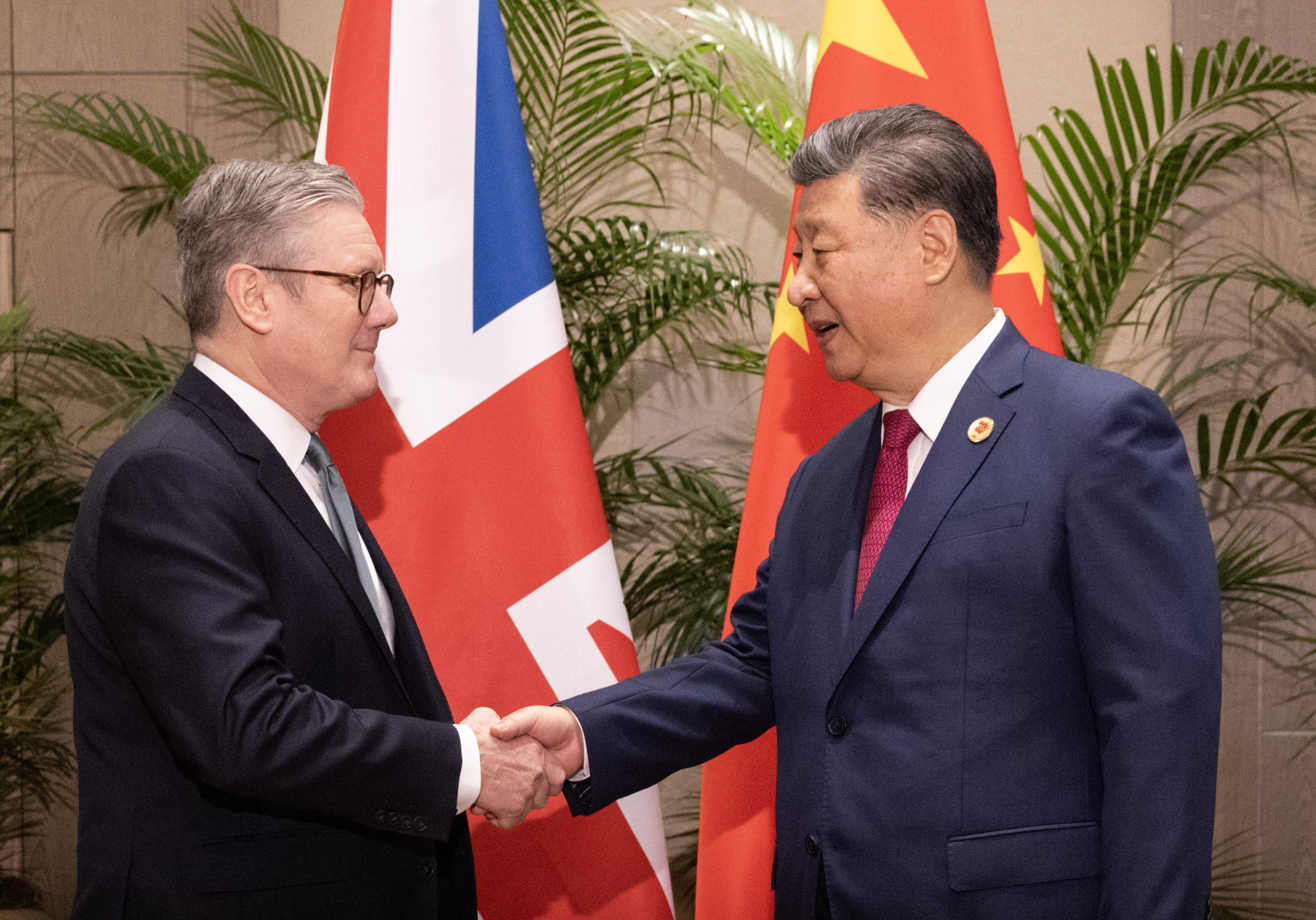
Starmer and Chinese President Xi Jinping at the G20 summit in Brazil, 18 November 2024

In July 2024 Starmer pledged to take a tougher approach to China on human rights and security issues, including China's support for Russia during the Russian invasion of Ukraine. In November 2024, Starmer met Chinese leader Xi Jinping at the G20 summit in Rio de Janeiro and told him he wanted to build a 'consistent, durable, respectful' relationship with China.

In November 2025, MI5 issued a rare espionage alert to UK parliamentarians, warning that Chinese intelligence services are using LinkedIn to target and recruit individuals with access to sensitive information.

In December 2025, Starmer redefined Britain's approach to China, advocating for a "pragmatic" economic relationship while explicitly acknowledging that China poses genuine "national security threats". Critics, however, argue this approach risks downplaying human rights abuses and security threats for economic gain.

==== Russian invasion of Ukraine ====
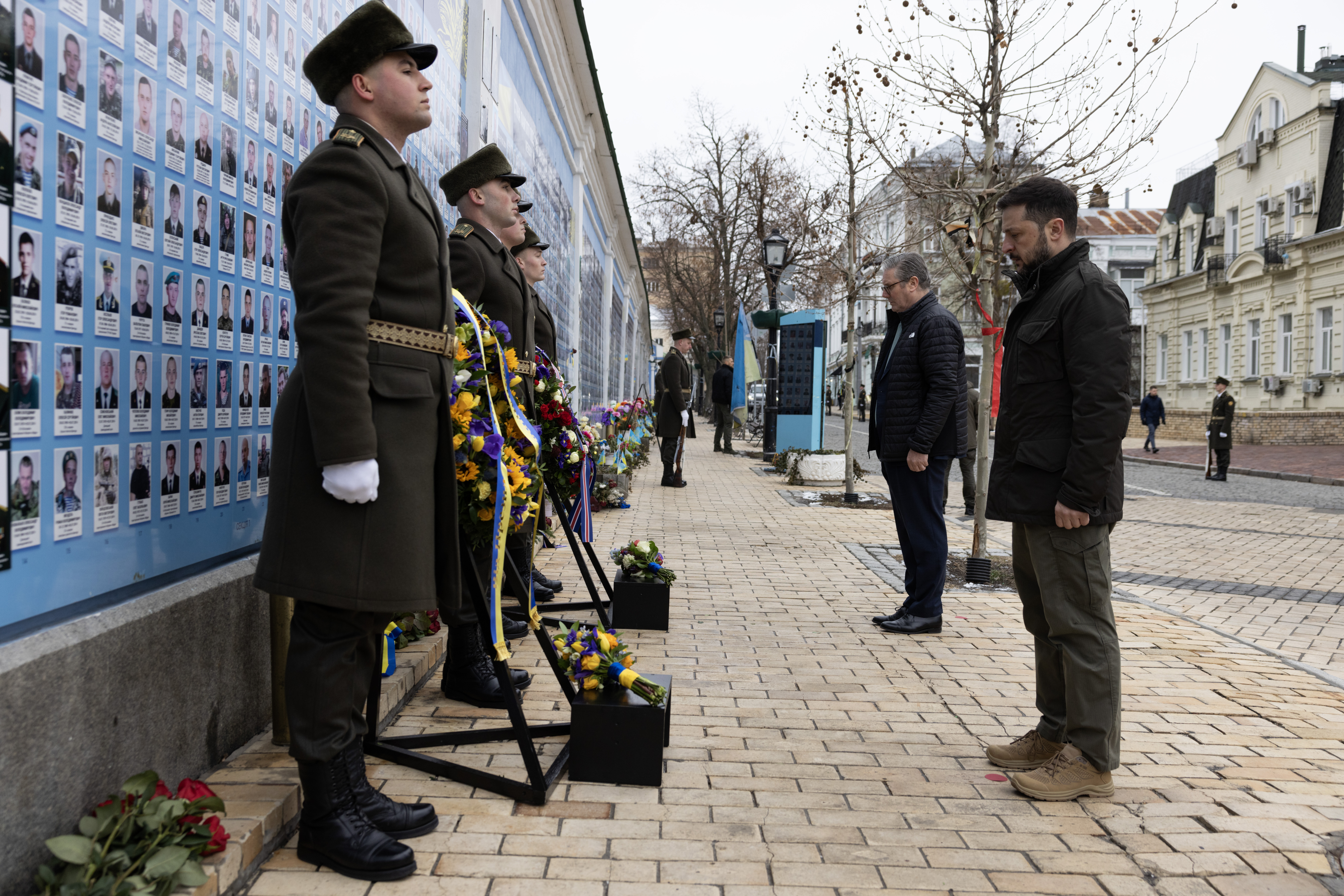
Starmer and Zelenskyy honoring fallen Ukrainian soldiers at The Wall of Remembrance of the Fallen for Ukraine in Kyiv, 16 January 2025

In January 2025, Starmer announced that the UK would provide £4.5 billion in military support to Ukraine throughout 2025. On 16 January 2025, Starmer and Zelenskyy signed a landmark 100-Year Partnership Agreement in Kyiv. The government has stated it will sustain £3 billion a year in military aid until 2031, and 229,900 Ukrainian refugees have been supported in the UK. The UK has also made a loan of £2.26 billion to Ukraine as its share of the G7 Extraordinary Revenue Acceleration $50 billion loan.

On 16 February 2025 Starmer said he is ready to deploy British peacekeeping units in Ukraine if there is a peace deal to end the Russian invasion of Ukraine.

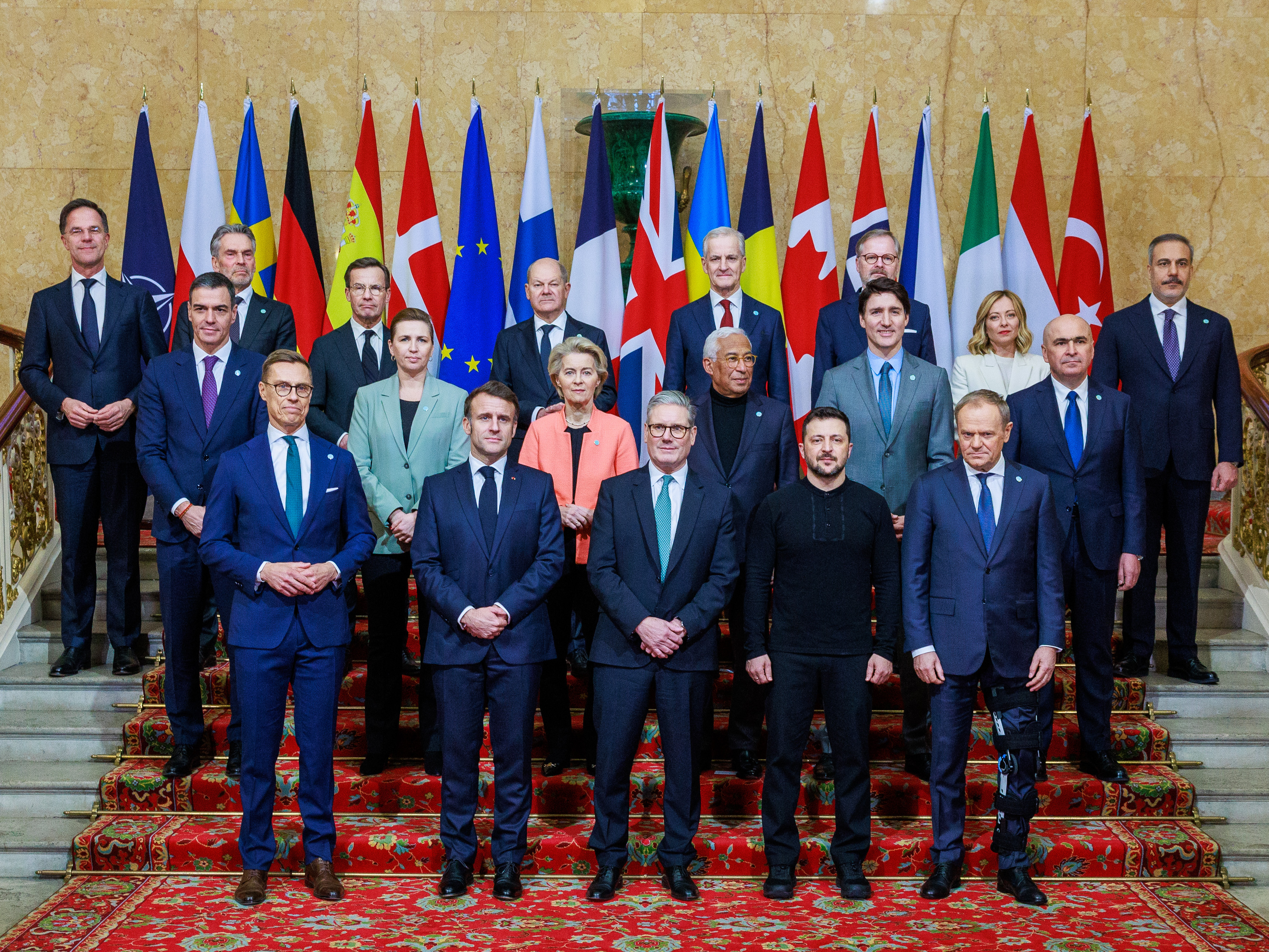
Starmer with international leaders at the 2025 London Summit on Ukraine

In addition, Starmer hosted the 2025 London Summit on Ukraine with 18 world leaders, and announced the creation of a Coalition of the willing to support peace in Ukraine and to end the Russian invasion of Ukraine. The stated aim of the initiative is to facilitate the peace negotiation attempts launched and mediated by the United States between Ukraine and Russia in February 2025, by helping to build up strong enough security guarantees for Ukraine to ensure that a potential reached ceasefire or peace deal would be lasting. Besides serving the role as building up a potential peacekeeping force, the coalition have also expressed readiness to increase military support for Ukraine and strengthen economic sanctions against Russia, in the event that the ongoing negotiations for a "comprehensive ceasefire" or "peace deal" would fail. As of 20 March 2025, the exact shape and function of the coalition was described as still being subject to ongoing planning, but moved into an "operational phase".

Starmer has actively urged NATO allies to "ramp up" the provision of long-range weapons to Ukraine. In 2025, Starmer's government significantly expanded the UK's commitment to Storm Shadow missiles through both replenishment of national stockpiles and new supplies for Ukraine. Starmer championed a plan to use the profits from frozen Russian sovereign assets to provide reparations loans to Ukraine.

==== Israel-Palestine conflict ====
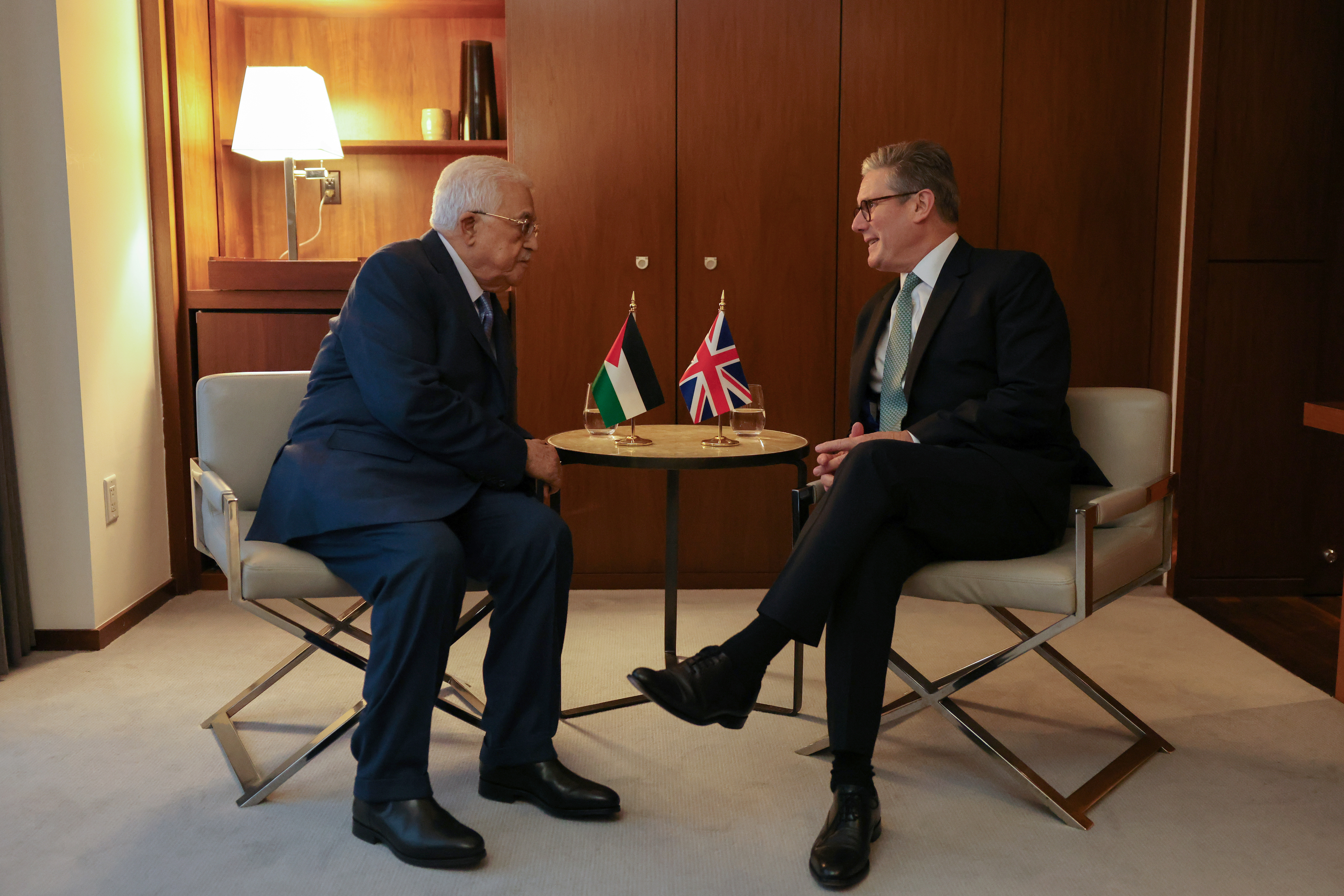
Starmer meeting with Mahmoud Abbas, President of Palestine, New York, September 2024

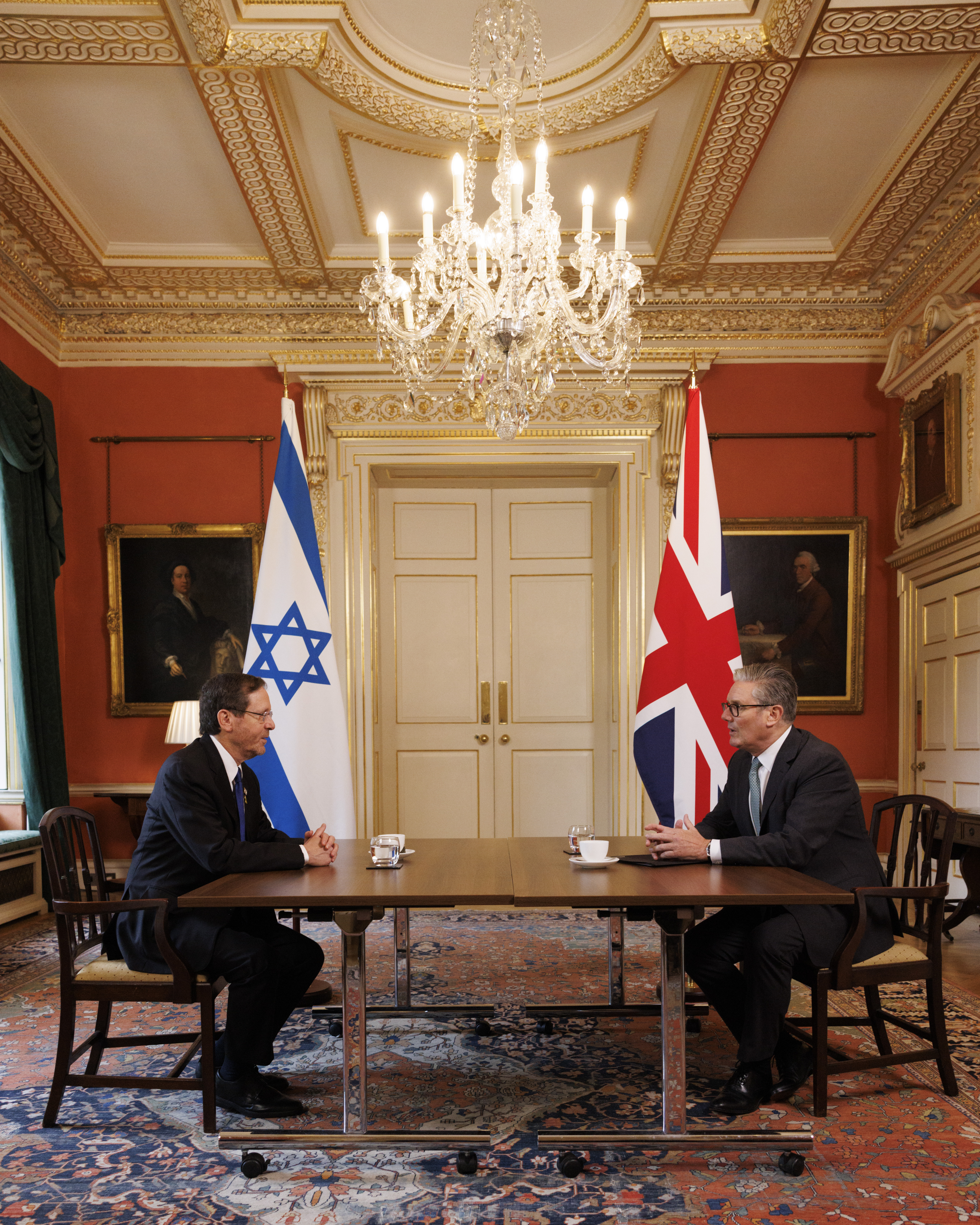
Keir Starmer meeting with Israeli President Isaac Herzog, 10 Downing Street, 10 September 2025

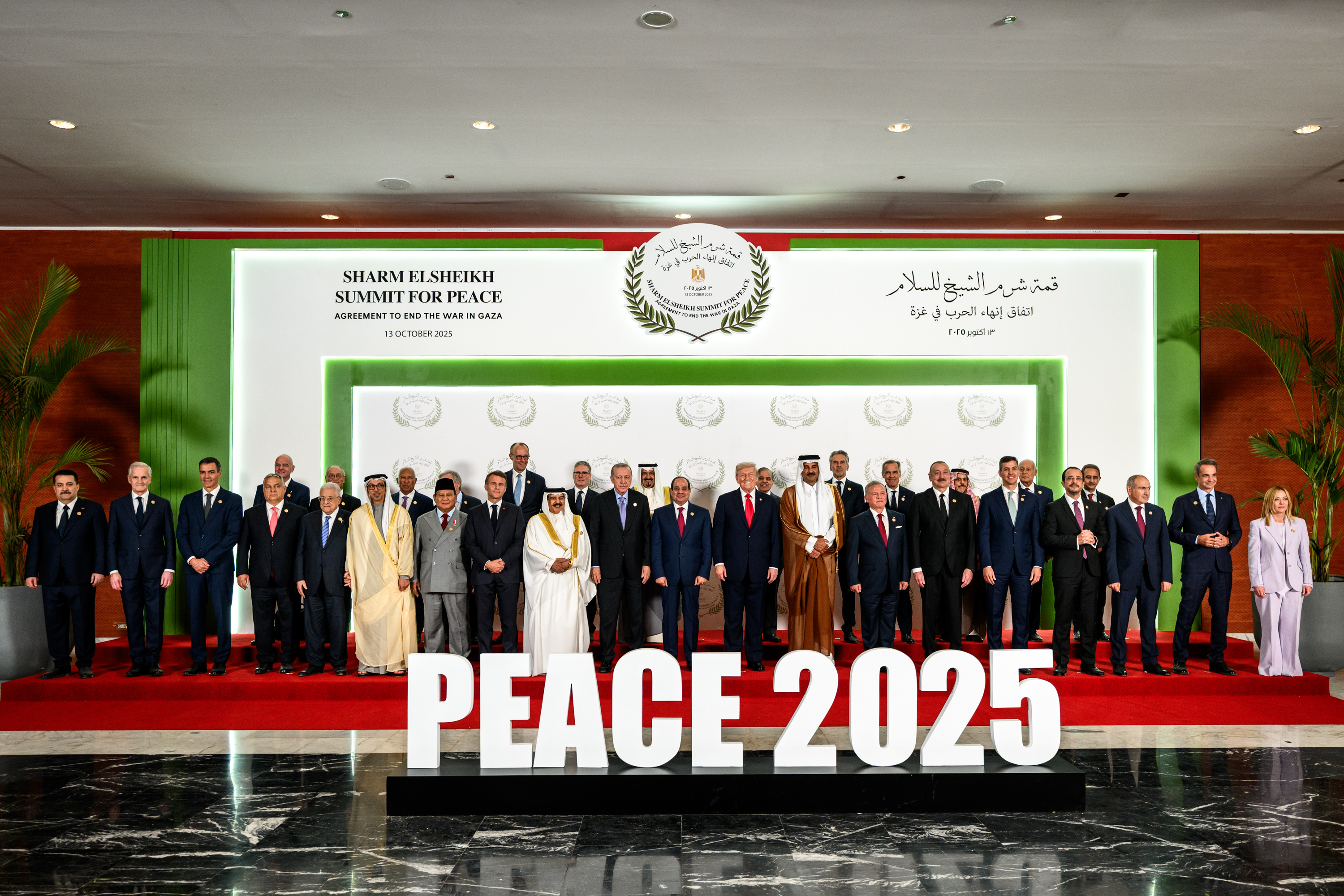
Starmer with international leaders at the 2025 Gaza peace summit

Starmer's government supports Israel's right to self-defence and has not blocked the sale of weapons and military equipment to Israel. Starmer has also condemned some of Israel's actions and called for a ceasefire in the Gaza war, sent humanitarian aid to Gaza, and supported a two-state solution.

Under Starmer's premiership, the licences of some British arms sales to Israel were suspended in September 2024 because of a "clear risk" that the weapons could be used to violate international law. Lammy announced the suspension of 30 out of 350 arms export licences to Israel, affecting equipment such as parts for fighter jets, helicopters and drones. However, the value of arms exports to Israel rose in the three months after the partial ban. A spokesman for the Department for Business and Trade (DBT) said that most of these licenses were "for items being produced in Israel for third countries".

After Israel's parliament banned UNRWA in October 2024, Starmer issued a statement saying he was "gravely concerned". He said "The humanitarian situation in Gaza is simply unacceptable" and "Only UNRWA can deliver humanitarian aid at the scale and pace needed".

In November 2024, Starmer refused to call Israel's actions in Gaza "genocide". Later that month, Starmer's government stated that Netanyahu would be arrested if he travels to the UK, after the International Criminal Court issued an international arrest warrant for him for alleged war crimes.

On 18 March 2025 Foreign Secretary David Lammy said that Israel had breached international law by blocking aid to the Gaza Strip. However, Starmer's government rejected Lammy's statement. A spokesman for Starmer's government said: "Our position remains that Israel's actions in Gaza are at clear risk of breaching international humanitarian law ... The government is not an international court, and, therefore, it is up to courts to make judgments". Asked whether Lammy should apologise, they added: "I'll leave that to the Foreign Office".

Starmer issued a joint statement in May 2025 condemning Israel's renewed offensive against Gaza. It was also signed by Emmanuel Macron of France and Mark Carney of Canada. The statement called for Israel to immediately stop its military operations and to immediately allow humanitarian aid into Gaza. The statement condemned Israel's plan to ethnically cleanse the Gaza Strip as "abhorrent" and against international law. He said his government would take "concrete actions" if Israel continued its "egregious actions". Netanyahu accused Starmer of siding with Hamas, saying "you're on the wrong side of justice, you're on the wrong side of humanity and you're on the wrong side of history".

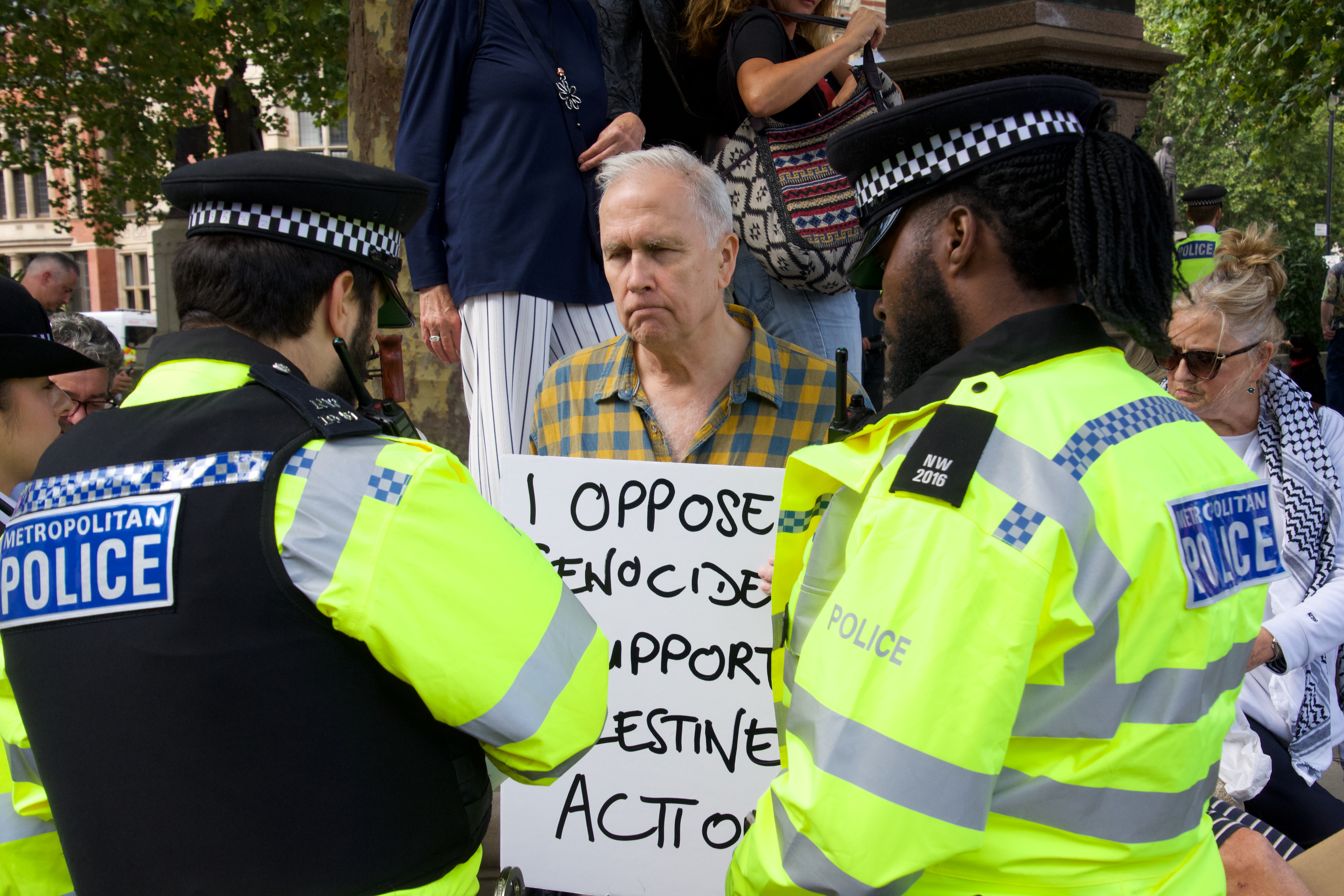
Metropolitan Police making arrests at a Palestine Action protest in London, 6 September 2025

On 20 May 2025, the UK suspended talks on a trade deal with Israel, summoned the country's ambassador, and imposed new sanctions against Israeli West Bank settlers. Foreign Secretary David Lammy called Israel's renewed offensive "morally unjustifiable". Referring to Israeli plans to ethnically cleanse the Gaza Strip, Lammy said "It is extremism, it is dangerous, it is repellent, it is monstrous, and I condemn it in the strongest possible terms".

Following its break-in into RAF Brize Norton, the home secretary, Yvette Cooper, introduced legislation in Parliament to proscribe Palestine Action under the Terrorism Act 2000, making membership illegal. On 9 August 2025, a large demonstration in support of Palestine Action was held at Parliament Square. When Big Ben chimed 1 p.m. during the protest, large numbers of demonstrators revealed signs which read "I oppose genocide. I support Palestine Action", leading to the arrest of 532 people—the largest made by the Metropolitan Police on a single day in the previous 10 years.

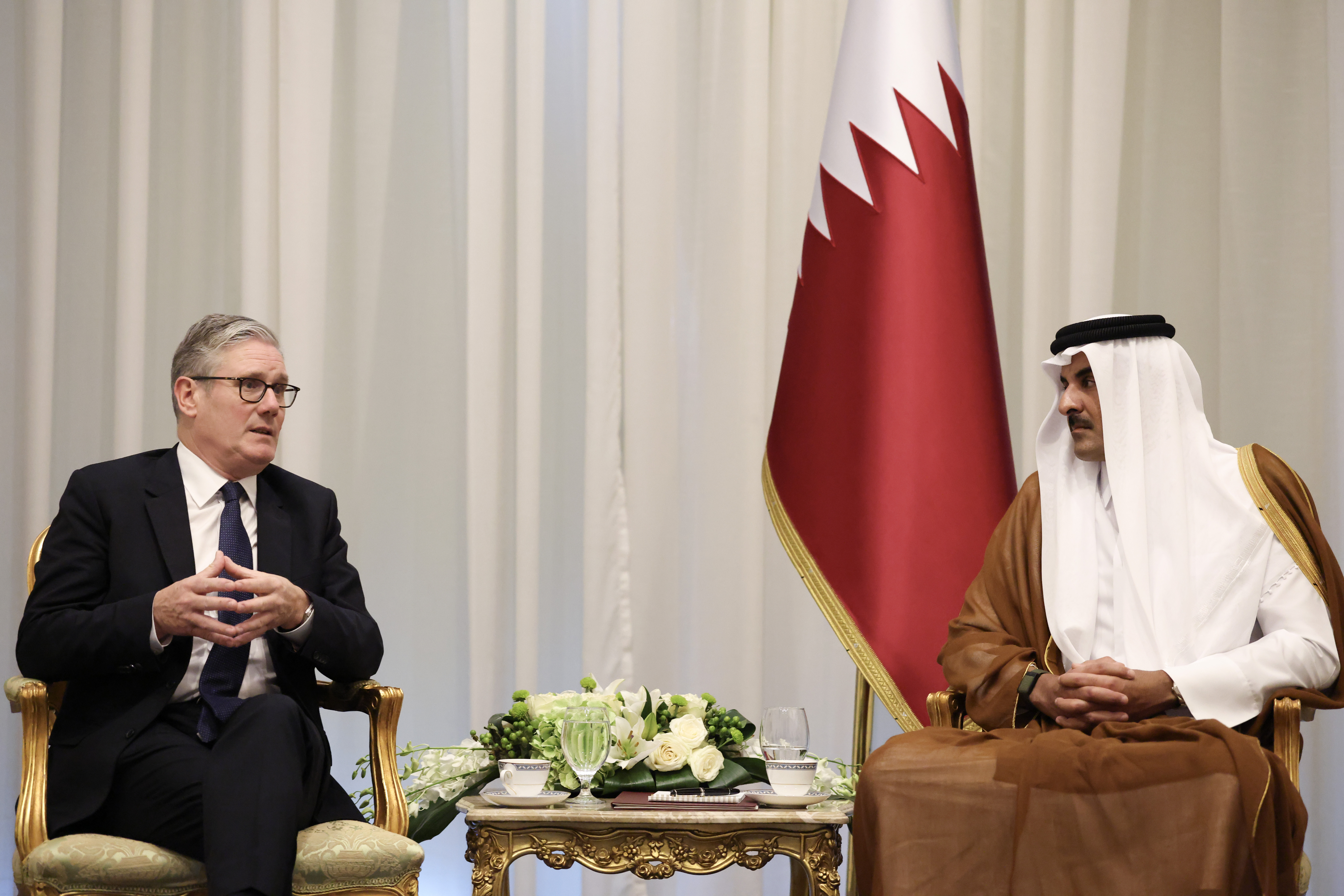
Starmer with Qatari Emir Tamim bin Hamad Al Thani in Sharm El Sheikh, Egypt, October 2025

As of late 2025, the UK continued to allow the sale of critical military hardware, most notably parts for F-35 fighter jets. Starmer's government faced persistent domestic pressure over its Middle East policy, characterized by The Gaza Tribunal and significant internal party dissent. The Guardian has described the tribunal as "a thorn in Keir Starmer's side as his party seeks to retain the backing of leftwing and Muslim voters at the next election."

==== Agreement on the return of the Chagos Archipelago to Mauritius ====
In May 2025, Starmer defended before the House of Commons the agreement to return the Chagos Archipelago to Mauritius, located in the British Indian Ocean Territory, which notably houses a British and American military base.

=== Party management ===
==== Scandals ====
===== Suspension of rebel Labour MPs =====
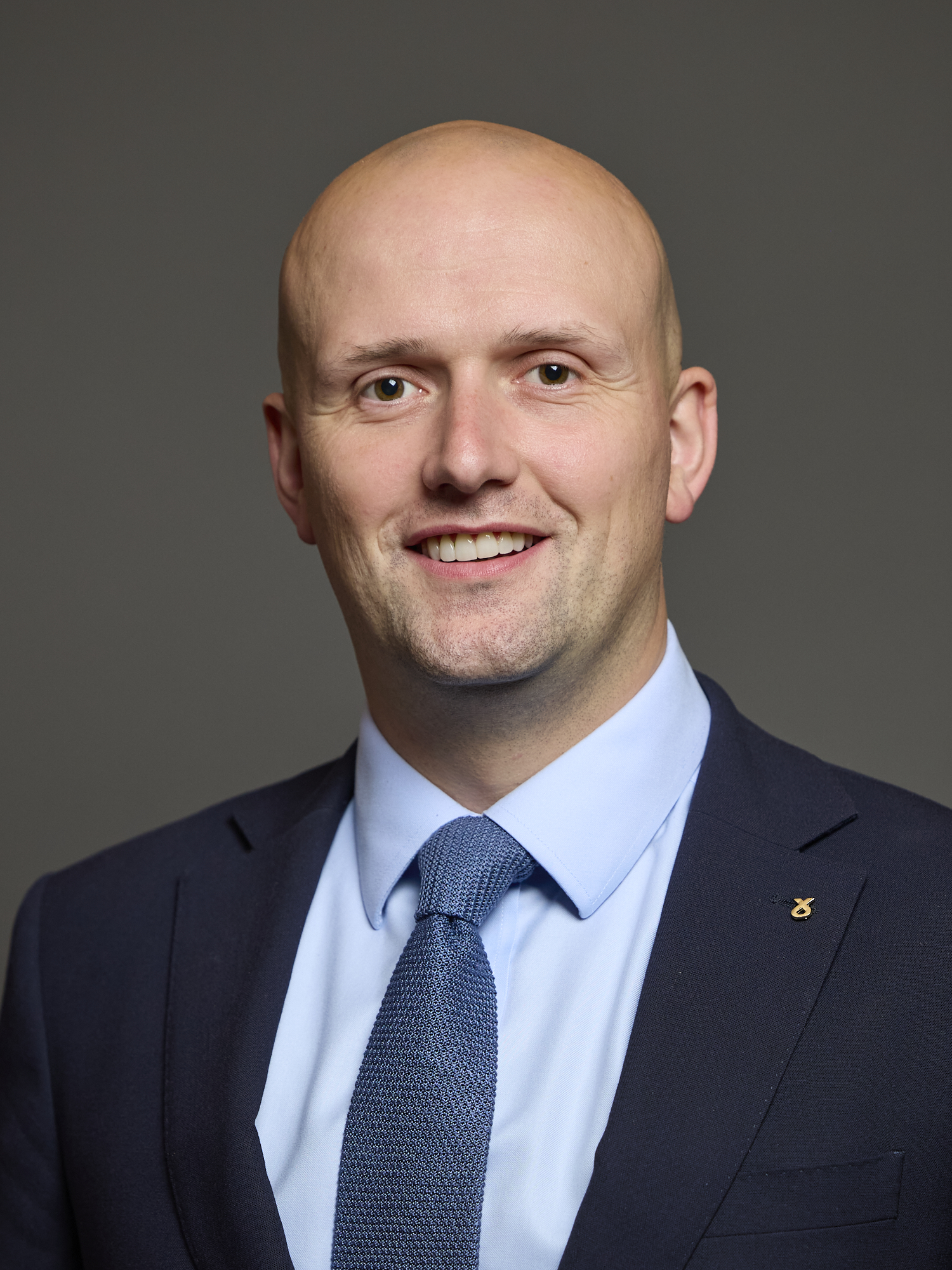
Stephen Flynn, who supported an amendment by the SNP to scrap the two child benefit cap, leading to Labour withdrawing the whip from 7 of its MPs who had supported it

Starmer and Reeves initially refused to scrap the benefit cap introduced by the Cameron–Clegg coalition, citing financial reasons. The cap was introduced in 2013 as part of the coalition government's wide-reaching welfare reform agenda which included the introduction of Universal Credit and reforms of housing benefit and disability benefits. Starmer's government cited wide public support for the measure, despite it being highly controversial. The benefit cap primarily affects families with children, high rents, or both. By 2024, the year Starmer and Reeves entered government, two-thirds of the families affected by the cap were single-parent families, half of which had a child under five.

On 23 July 2024 Labour withdrew the whip from seven of its MPs who had supported an amendment tabled by the Scottish National Party (SNP)'s Westminster leader, Stephen Flynn, to scrap it, with Flynn stating that scrapping the cap would immediately raise 300,000 children out of poverty. MPs rejected the SNP amendment by 363 votes to 103. The seven Labour MPs suspended for six months were John McDonnell, Richard Burgon, Ian Byrne, Rebecca Long-Bailey, Imran Hussain, Apsana Begum and Zarah Sultana, all of whom then sat as independents. Burgon, Byrne, Long-Bailey and Hussain had the Labour whip restored on 5 February 2025, while Sultana, McDonnell and Begum continued to sit as independents. Starmer launched a Child Poverty Taskforce, in which expert officials from across government would work together on how best to support more than four million children living in poverty. On 26 November 2025, Reeves announced that the two child benefit cap will be scrapped in 2026 in the 2025 budget.

During the Starmer leadership, 30 Labour MPs had the whip withdrawn, which was more than under any other Labour leader since 1988.

===== Conversion of Winter Fuel Payment to a means-tested benefit =====
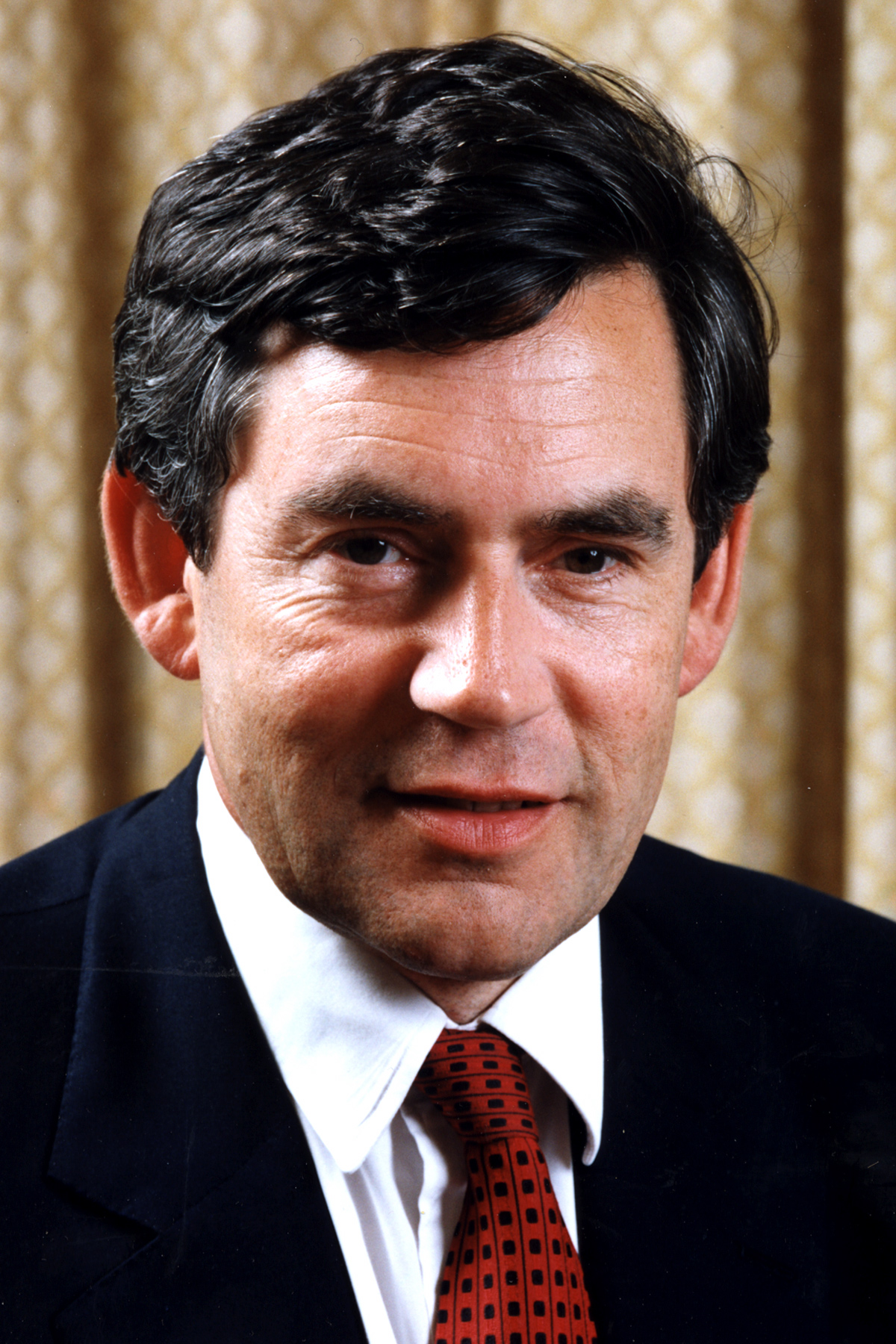
Gordon Brown (then chancellor) introduced the policy.

In July 2024, Chancellor Rachel Reeves announced that the Winter Fuel Payment, a welfare payment for elderly people introduced in 1997 by former chancellor and prime minister Gordon Brown intended to cover the additional costs of heating over the winter months, would only be given to those in receipt of Pension Credit or other means-tested benefits. This removed the benefit from around 10 million pensioners. The announcement of this policy to remove fuel payments from pensioners took the nation by surprise as it had not been publicised in advance or included in Labour's manifesto for the election. With the announcement being made shortly before the Commons party conference season recess, there was only a limited initial response. However, several Labour MPs returned to Westminster complaining that their constituents were "furious and, in some cases, deeply worried".

On 5 September, Starmer conceded to demands and promised a binding vote in the Commons on whether the changes to the fuel payment would be implemented. The change of heart came after unease amongst Labour MPs, with many of them signing an early day motion challenging the changes, and the opposition Conservative Party submitted a motion to annul the government's change to regulations. The Conservative motion was debated on 10 September, and in the vote that followed, 348 MPs backed the government and 228 supported the opposition motion. With a majority of 120 to the government, the policy was implemented. A total of 52 Labour MPs, including seven ministers, did not participate in the vote. Labour MP Jon Trickett voted against the government. BBC News said that around 20 of the Labour MPs who did not participate had publicly expressed opposition to the policy previously.

The government was put under pressure to abandon this policy by the Trades Union Congress (TUC) as it started its annual conference on 9 September. The TUC general secretary, Paul Nowak, said that he was concerned about the removal of the universal payment for all but the poorest pensioners. The general secretary of Unite, Sharon Graham, repeated her call for the decision to be reversed. Fran Heathcote of the PCS union said that the plan was a "misstep" and it needed to be "put right". At the Labour Party conference, held between 23 and 25 September, Unite and the Communication Workers Union, managed to reserve time for a motion opposing the government's fuel payment policy to be debated and a non-binding vote taken. The motion was scheduled to be debated on the first day of the conference, but on the day, the same day that Reeves was due to give a speech, the vote was postponed until the last day of the conference – after Starmer had left. The announcement of the move was greeted with loud boos and jeers from the conference attendees. The Unite union said that by rescheduling their motion to the very end of the conference, the conference organisers had sought to silence them. The Labour leadership lost the vote, with delegates supporting the motion to scrap the government's policy.

The announcement of this policy to remove fuel payments from pensioners took the nation by surprise as it had not been publicised in advance or included in Labour's manifesto for the election. With the announcement being made shortly before the Commons party conference season recess, there was only a limited initial response. However, several Labour MPs returned to Westminster complaining that their constituents were "furious and, in some cases, deeply worried". In August, consumer journalist and founder of MoneySavingExpert, Martin Lewis, suggested that the government should rethink their plans to restrict who would get the payment saying they had gone too far by limiting it to only the "absolute poorest pensioners on the very lowest income". Labour MP Rachael Maskell said, "Being cold at home can lead to stroke, heart attack, hypothermia, pneumonia and other such illnesses" and recommended that the government should read the work of Professor Sir Michael Marmot and Sir Chris Whitty with respect to this "so that we can take a public health approach to people being warm at home, to mitigate the cost that could come without putting right mitigation around the winter fuel payments". On 9 September it was reported that Labour MPs, including frontbenchers, were worried that Reeves's "brutal" plan for the fuel allowance would result in more older people ending up in hospital over the winter. The UK's leading charity for older people, Age UK, wrote to Reeves with its proposal which it says would prevent around two million pensioners, for whom the payment is badly needed, from having the payment stopped. At Prime Minister's Questions on 11 September, the former prime minister, leader of the opposition, Rishi Sunak, accused Starmer of covering up the impact assessment for the policy, asking him if the estimate for the number of deaths was higher or lower than the 3,850 Labour had previously forecast would result from this policy. Starmer did not answer that question directly.

===== Free gifts and hospitality controversy =====
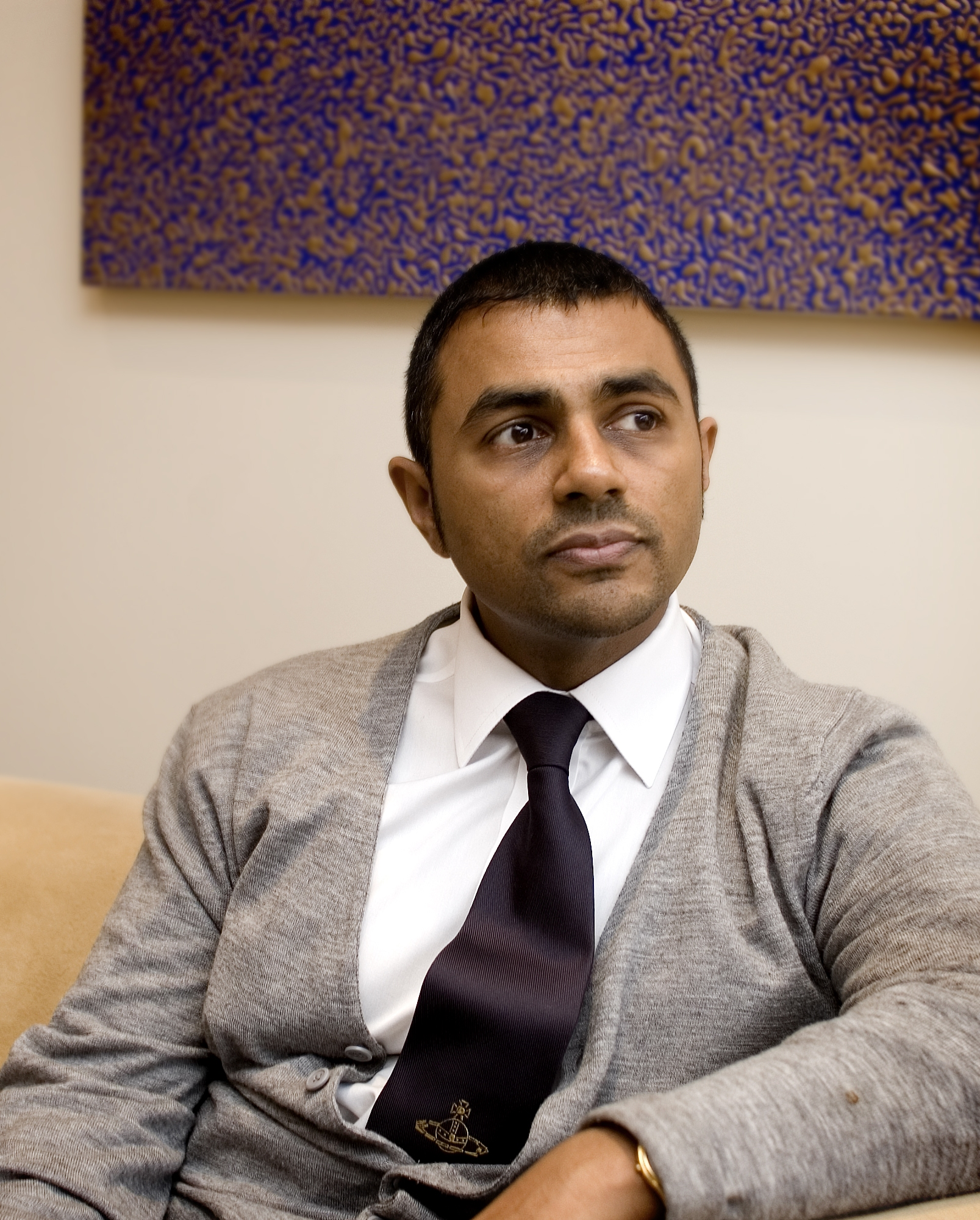
Waheed Alli, Baron Alli pictured in 2010

On 24 August 2024 The Times reported that, shortly after Starmer became the prime minister, Waheed Alli, Baron Alli, Starmer's biggest personal donor, had been given a security pass. The pass gave Alli unrestricted access to Downing Street, and he then hosted a party there for other Labour Party donors. This gave rise to suspicions of "cash for access" and claims of "cronyism". On 15 September 2024 reports emerged in the British media that Starmer had initially failed to declare £5,000 of gifts used to purchase clothes for his wife, Victoria Starmer. The gifts had been given by Alli, who had also given Starmer a number of clothing-related gifts, including £2,435 worth of eyeglasses, and had given Labour deputy leader Angela Rayner gifts worth £3,550 of clothes in June 2024. It was subsequently reported that Starmer had accepted over £107,145 worth of gifts, benefits, and hospitality since the 2019 general election, including tickets to Arsenal F.C. matches and Taylor Swift concerts, two-and-a-half times more than any other MP. It was also reported that Health Secretary Wes Streeting had been gifted four Taylor Swift concert tickets, worth a total of £1,160, by The Football Association, and that Chancellor of the Exchequer Rachel Reeves had accepted £7,500 worth of clothes in 2024 from Juliet Rosenfeld, which were registered as donations "to support the shadow chancellor's office". On 17 September 10 Downing Street announced that Parliamentary Commissioner for Standards Daniel Greenberg would not investigate the gifts.

On 20 September 2024, as the Labour Party Conference was set to begin, Starmer as well as Reeves and Rayner announced they would no longer accept clothes from donors. That weekend, The Mail on Sunday reported that Secretary of State for Education Bridget Phillipson had received a £14,000 gift from Alli for her 40th birthday party. Phillipson defended the gift, saying that it had been used "to get people together in a professional context" ahead of her birthday party and that it had been properly declared in the register of interests. Phillipson also admitted to accepting Taylor Swift concert tickets, saying that it was "hard to say no". When Alli was asked about the controversy at the Conference by a Sky News reporter, he stated that he didn't want to be asked about it, saying that the questions were "not very nice." That same weekend, Leader of the House of Commons Lucy Powell stated that the government had "no plans" to change the rules on MP accepting gifts. Starmer subsequently admitted to accepting accommodation worth £20,000 from Alli between May and July 2024, stating that the offer was for somewhere his son could study peacefully for his GCSEs. The exams that year finished in mid-June. Starmer's use of accommodation provided by Alli sparked further controversy when it was reported that a video calling for Brits to stay at home that Starmer had filmed in December 2021, during the third wave of the COVID-19 pandemic, had been filmed in a flat belonging to Alli. On 27 September The Guardian reported that Starmer had received an additional £16,000 worth of clothes as a gift from Alli in late 2023 and early 2024. Although those gifts had been declared in time, they had been declared as money "for the private office" of Starmer, and not as clothing.

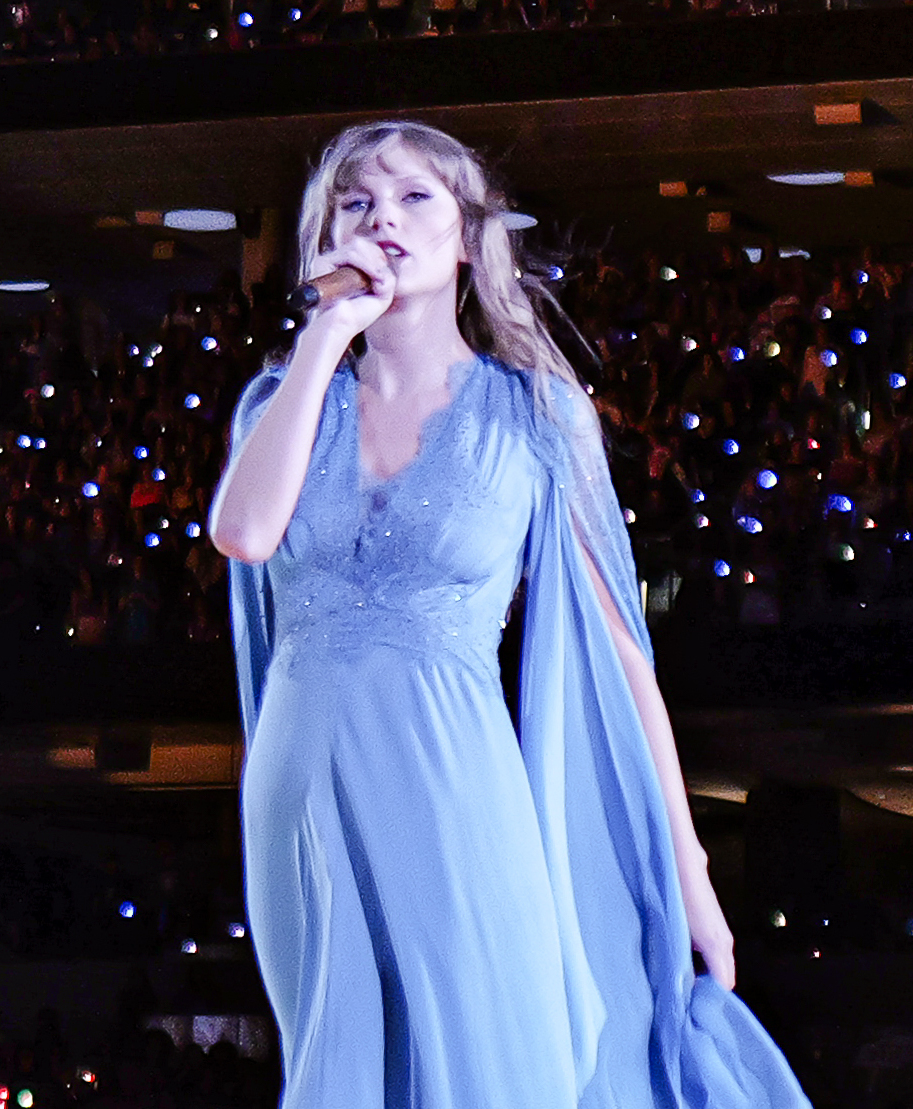
In October 2024, it was reported that the Special Escort Group would be provided for Taylor Swift for the remainder of The Eras Tour shows in London.

In October 2024 it was reported that the Metropolitan Police's Special Escort Group—a top-level security usually provided for members of the British royal family and heads of state—would be provided for Swift and crew for the remainder of The Eras Tour shows in London. A political scandal soon developed in the United Kingdom as the politicians of opposition Conservative Party accused the ruling Labour Party of receiving free tickets to the Eras Tour in exchange of the security grant. It was alleged that Labour politicians, ranging from Starmer to London mayor Sadiq Khan, had received around £20,000 in free tickets, after Swift's demand for the security was initially denied, with the politicians subsequently pressuring the police to give in. The prime minister's office denied that the free tickets were connected to security demands, however admitted that Starmer meeting Swift at the concert could have created a perception of a conflict of interest. The former Conservative prime minister Boris Johnson said Swift has made the United Kingdom "look like a banana republic"; Rebecca Reid of i said "the Eras tour has been dragged into a tangential political row" and criticised Johnson, writing that he did not care about women's safety; Reid opined that Swift deserves the police convoy in light of the Vienna threat and the Southport stabbing.

Although no Parliamentary rules were broken nor was there clear evidence that any improper favour had been sought by those who offered Starmer gifts, the controversy still posed a political problem for Labour, as it left them facing accusations of hypocrisy and that it risked conflicting with the government's message of budget austerity. Starmer stated that there was a "massive difference between declarations and corruption," saying that "all MPs get gifts" and that as prime minister, he "can't go into the stands because of security reasons. Therefore, if I don't accept a gift of hospitality, I can't go to a game." Members of Starmer's cabinet defended his actions. Chancellor of the Duchy of Lancaster Pat McFadden said that Starmer "will, and does, conduct himself with integrity" and that the controversy was "because of taking advice and trying to make sure you abide by the rules." Foreign Secretary David Lammy stated that successive prime ministers "do rely on political donations so they can look their best both in the hope of representing the country, if you're in the opposition, or as prime minister." Health Secretary Wes Streeting stated that he was "proud" of people who contributed "their money to our politics," describing it as "a noble pursuit just like giving to charity." Business Secretary Jonathan Reynolds said that he had "no problem" with the acceptance of gifts that can be of "a more personal nature" opining that hard-working politicians were entitled to "a bit of relaxation".

In the first five months in office Starmer spent 26 days out of the country on 16 separate foreign trips, more than any Conservative PM in a similar timeframe. Luke Tryl of More in Common UK stated that focus groups have started to say “Starmer always seems to be abroad”.

Labour backbencher Rosie Duffield resigned the Labour whip over the row, accusing her government of pursuing "cruel and unnecessary" policies and accused Starmer of "hypocrisy" for accepting gifts. In her resignation letter she accused Starmer and senior Labour MPs of "sleaze, nepotism and apparent avarice" which are "off the scale". She added "I'm so ashamed of what you and your inner circle have done to tarnish and humiliate our once proud party". Another Labour backbencher, and Mother of the House, former Shadow Home Secretary Diane Abbott said that under the leadership of Starmer, the Labour Party is now "in the pocket of millionaires". Former Labour Party Deputy Leader Baroness Harman criticised Starmer's response to the controversy, saying that Starmer was "not a sort of money focused, greedy type person," but that "doubling down and trying to justify it is making things worse." Former Labour Shadow Chancellor of the Exchequer John McDonnell criticised Starmer for accepting the gifts while "talking about tough decisions and painful policies coming and possibly a new wave of austerity," adding that Labour Party founder Keir Hardie attended Parliament in "an ordinary working man's suit instead of the usual formal dress and he did so because he wanted to make the point that we represent working people." The Guardian published an editorial warning that the Labour government did not have the benefit of a political honeymoon and that it was "hard to believe that a leader who laid such stress on the need to rebuild trust in politics should behave so naively."

===== Louise Haigh situation =====
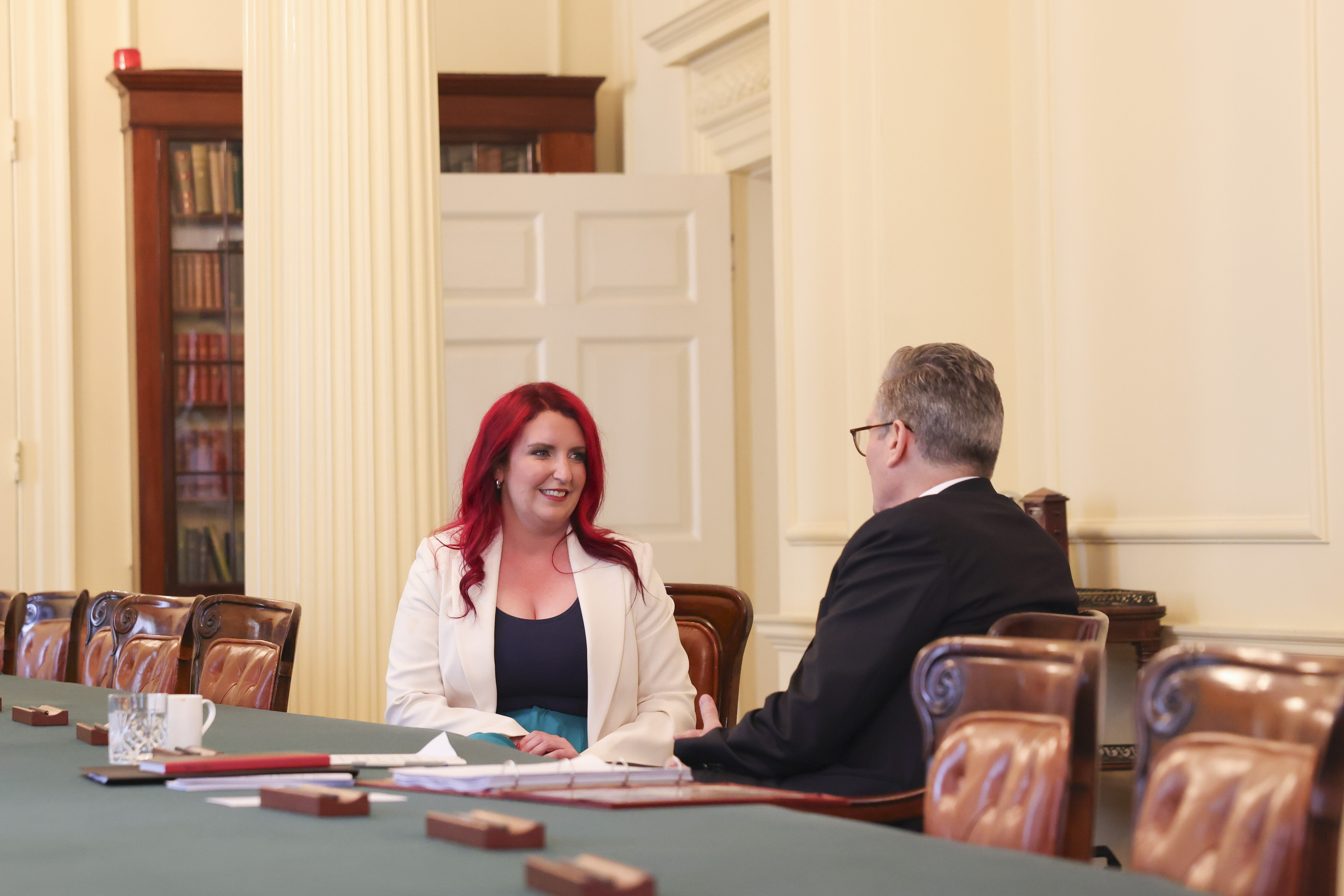
It emerged in November 2024 that Louise Haigh had pleaded guilty to fraud by false representation in 2014 after falsely reporting in 2013 to police that her work phone had been stolen; she subsequently resigned as Transport Secretary

On 28 November 2024, it emerged that then Transport Secretary Louise Haigh had pleaded guilty to fraud by false representation relating to misleading police in 2014. In a statement, Haigh said that she had been mugged on a night out in 2013 whilst working as a public policy manager for the insurer Aviva. She said that she had given the police a list of items that she thought were missing from her handbag, which wrongly included her mobile work phone supplied by Aviva. She was issued with a new phone by her employer, but Haigh said she later discovered her old phone in a drawer which she switched on. Haigh said that this signal was picked up on by Aviva and they alerted it to the police, who called in Haigh for police questioning to make a statement. During the interview with the police, Haigh said that her solicitor had advised her "not to comment", and she did not respond to questions about the use of the phone when approached for comment. A case file was sent to the Crown Prosecution Service and she was charged with fraud by false representation. Six months before she was elected as an MP at the 2015 general election in November 2014, Haigh pleaded guilty when she appeared at the Camberwell Green magistrates' court, and received a conditional discharge.

Starmer spoke to Haigh on the night of 28 November and said that it would be better for her and the government if she stood down; Haigh agreed and subsequently resigned as Transport Secretary that night. The prime minister's spokesperson said in a briefing with reporters on 29 November that Starmer accepted Haigh's resignation following "further information emerging". In a letter to Starmer, Haigh stated that whilst she was "totally committed to our political project," she believed it would be best served supporting him from "outside government". Haigh also said that the issue would "inevitably be a distraction" from delivering on the work and policies of the government, but said she took "pride" in what they had done. In response, Starmer said that Haigh had made "huge strides" as Transport Secretary, and that she still had a "huge contribution to make in the future". She was succeeded as Transport Secretary by Heidi Alexander.

===== Farmers' protests =====
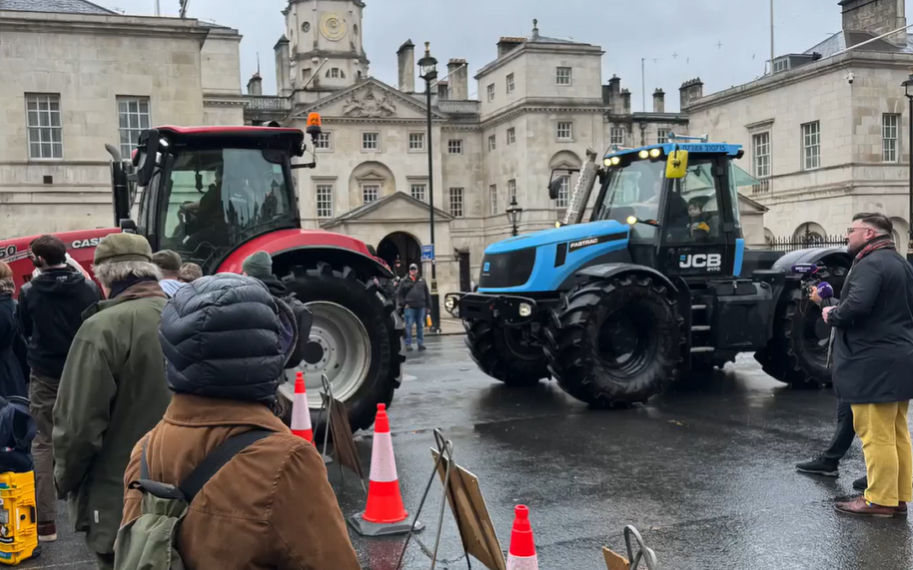
Tractors on the streets of London during a farmers' protest in November 2024

In response to changes to inheritance tax law for family farms announced in the October budget, mass protests organised by farmer organisations, against new inheritance tax laws on agricultural assets, have taken place around the United Kingdom since November 2024. The new laws were proposed in the October 2024 budget, and have led to thousands of British farmers protesting, including in Parliament Square and addressing MPs directly in parliament.

The protests were a response to proposed changes to inheritance tax on agricultural assets, which media outlets dubbed as a "tractor tax". Previously, the intergenerational transfer of farms had been exempt from taxation as a result of 1992 tax break by the Conservative Major ministry intended to protect food security. In November 2024, the newly elected Labour Starmer ministry announced plans to remove the exemption from inheritance tax for farms valued over at least £1,000,000 in order to generate revenue for public services. Set to take effect in April 2026, the new policy would see a 20% inheritance tax on farm valued over that threshold, half the standard rate of inheritance tax, and could be paid interest-free across ten years.

Opposition to the change from farmers stemmed from their claim that farmers, while asset rich, are cash poor, which they said created a situation where heirs would have to sell farm land to meet tax obligations. Supporters of the change claimed it would mitigate and prevent wealthy individuals from buying farmland to avoid inheritance tax. Starmer responded to concerns by saying that the actual threshold for inheritance tax liability could reach up to as high as £3,000,000 once various exemptions were applied, including considerations for couples and specific agricultural property relief. The secretary of state for environment, food and rural affairs, Steve Reed, defended the tax changes as a measure to counter wealthy investors using agricultural land for tax avoidance, stating it had become "the most effective way for the super rich to avoid paying their inheritance tax." Since 2024, television presenter, journalist, farmer, and author Jeremy Clarkson has been extremely critical of Starmer and the Labour Party. Clarkson attended the England farmers' protests in London where he called tax hikes a "hammer blow to the back of the head" of British agriculture. Clarkson later labelled Starmer "a nightmare for farmers".

===== Handling of preexisting scandals =====
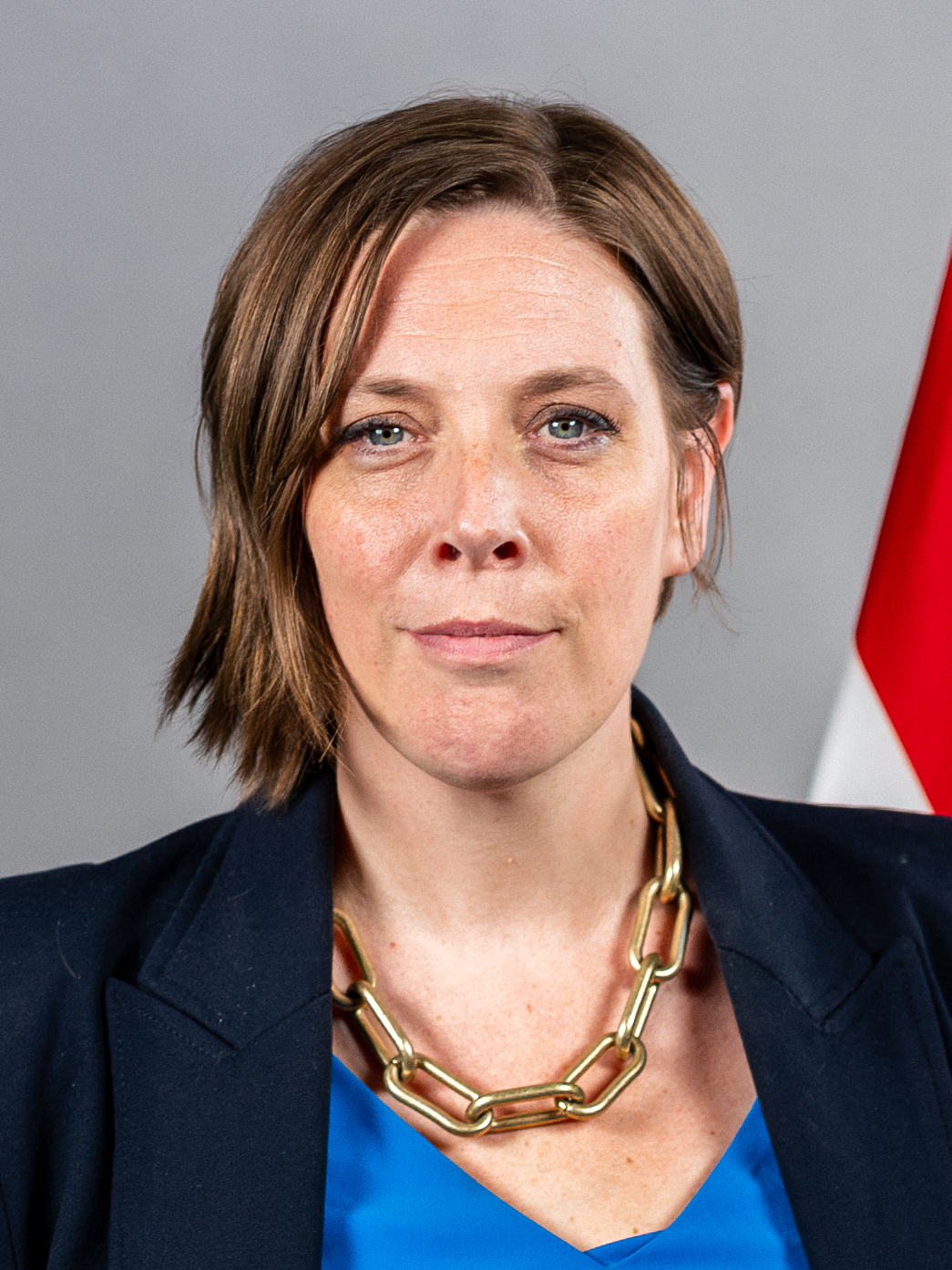
Jess Phillips, then Parliamentary Under-Secretary of State for Safeguarding and Violence Against Women and Girls

In October 2024 Jess Phillips, the Parliamentary Under-Secretary of State for Safeguarding and Violence Against Women and Girls, rejected Oldham Council's request for an independent public inquiry into the Oldham child sexual exploitation scandal and Grooming gangs scandal, favouring a locally-run inquiry instead. On 2 January 2025, the leader of the opposition, Kemi Badenoch, called for a national inquiry into group-based child sexual exploitation, criticising the Labour government for not supporting a government-led inquiry into Oldham. Phillips said that the previous Conservative government, of which Badenoch was a part, had also supported a local inquiry in Oldham.

Elon Musk called Phillips a "rape genocide apologist" and suggested she was attempting to shield Starmer from blame since he led the Crown Prosecution Service when the abuse occurred. Starmer was head of the CPS in 2009 when a decision was made not to prosecute an individual who was part of the Rochdale child sex abuse ring; however, there is no evidence Starmer was personally involved in the decision. In response, Starmer said politicians and activists were "spreading lies and misinformation" over grooming gangs, and were appealing to the far-right. (Note: Starmer said: "When politicians, and I mean politicians, who sat in government for many years are casual about honesty, decency, truth and the rule of law, calling for inquiries because they want to jump on a bandwagon of the far-right, then that affects politics because a robust debate can only be based on the true facts and that is why this is actually an important point about our politics, not about what anybody may or may not say on Twitter. My fight to change the way that the prosecution service operated is a matter of public record. Making sure the men responsible for these despicable acts were brought to justice. Put in the dock... then behind bars. That is why I brought the first prosecution for a grooming gang. Far-right voices have tried to rewrite history. Those spreading lies and misinformation are not interested in the victims. Those cheerleading for Tommy Robinson – a thug who was jailed for almost collapsing a grooming case – are not interested in justice. They are only interested in themselves.") Professor Alexis Jay, who chaired the Independent Inquiry into Child Sexual Abuse said: "It doesn't need more consultation, it does not need more research or discussion, it just needs to be done." Home Secretary Yvette Cooper announced a government-backed Oldham inquiry, and a nationwide review of evidence, on 16 January 2025. In May 2025, then Leader of the House of Commons Lucy Powell described discussion of rape gangs as a "dog whistle", which was condemned by survivors of the abuse. Reform UK called her comments "abhorrent" and asked the prime minister to consider sacking Powell while the Conservatives called on her to resign. She subsequently apologised.

In September 2024, following the release of the final inquiry into the 2017 Grenfell Tower fire, Starmer apologized "on behalf of the British state" for the failure to protect the tower's residents. He stated that the country had failed to discharge its "most fundamental duty" to protect people, and pledged to pursue "full accountability" for those responsible for the disaster. In one of his first actions, Starmer announced that companies condemned in the report for their involvement would be barred from receiving new government contracts. Upon the publication of the inquiry's final report, which laid out 58 recommendations, Starmer committed to implementing them in full. The report was damning, finding that the tragedy was the culmination of "decades of failure" by successive governments to regulate the use of combustible cladding. As of late 2024, Starmer acknowledged that progress on removing unsafe cladding from other buildings was "far, far too slow" and that his government would act to speed it up. Angela Rayner, then Deputy Prime Minister, told bereaved relatives and survivors that a decision had been made to demolish Grenfell Tower. The plans were confirmed on 7 February 2025, with dismantling of the tower expected to take two years. While Starmer's actions have been welcomed by campaigners, including Grenfell United, they have also been met with cautious demands for concrete, timely results. Grenfell United has insisted that the report's recommendations must be implemented without further delay. Bereaved families have stressed that real justice, including manslaughter charges for those responsible, has still not been delivered. Some survivors fear that the complex web of blame uncovered by the inquiry will make it harder to secure individual criminal accountability.

Campaigners of the victims of the British Post Office scandal, including Sir Alan Bates, have criticized Starmer for delays in resolving compensation claims for victims. In late 2024, Bates publicly stated that he had written to Starmer twice urging him to set a deadline for compensation payouts, but had received no response. Victims' demands: Following the publication of the Post Office Inquiry's first report in July 2025, victims spoke out directly to Starmer on BBC Breakfast, telling him and his new Labour government to "get your act together" and "stop being cruel". Starmer's government has pledged to prioritize compensation. In November 2024, a spokesperson for Number 10 confirmed a reply was sent to Bates and stated the government's commitment to getting redress to those affected "as quickly as possible". In October 2024, the government committed £1.8 billion for compensation in the Autumn Budget. The inquiry's report highlighted the "devastating impact" on victims, noting the high number of individuals who had considered or attempted suicide. It also criticised the "formidable difficulties" in delivering financial redress, which is handled through multiple compensation schemes.

As prime minister, Starmer championed and oversaw the introduction of the new Public Office (Accountability) Bill, also known as the "Hillsborough Law". The legislation, which received its first reading in Parliament in September 2025, aims to prevent future cover-ups by public officials and ensure justice for victims of major disasters like the Hillsborough disaster. Starmer met with campaigners, including Margaret Aspinall, whose son died at Hillsborough, to mark the bill's introduction. Aspinall said she was grateful to Starmer for fulfilling his promise. Starmer had previously faced criticism for delays, having pledged to introduce the law by the 36th anniversary of the disaster in April 2025. He insisted he wanted to "take the time to get it right" amid concerns from campaigners and MPs about civil servants watering down the bill. Starmer and other government ministers have framed the Hillsborough Law as a measure to address institutional failures in a range of public disasters, including the Horizon IT scandal, the infected blood scandal, and the Grenfell Tower fire. The legislation has been widely praised by campaigner groups and local leaders, including Mayor of Liverpool City Region Steve Rotheram, who described it as a "landmark moment". It has also been framed by some as an important part of Starmer's broader push to reset and strengthen the Labour party after recent political challenges.

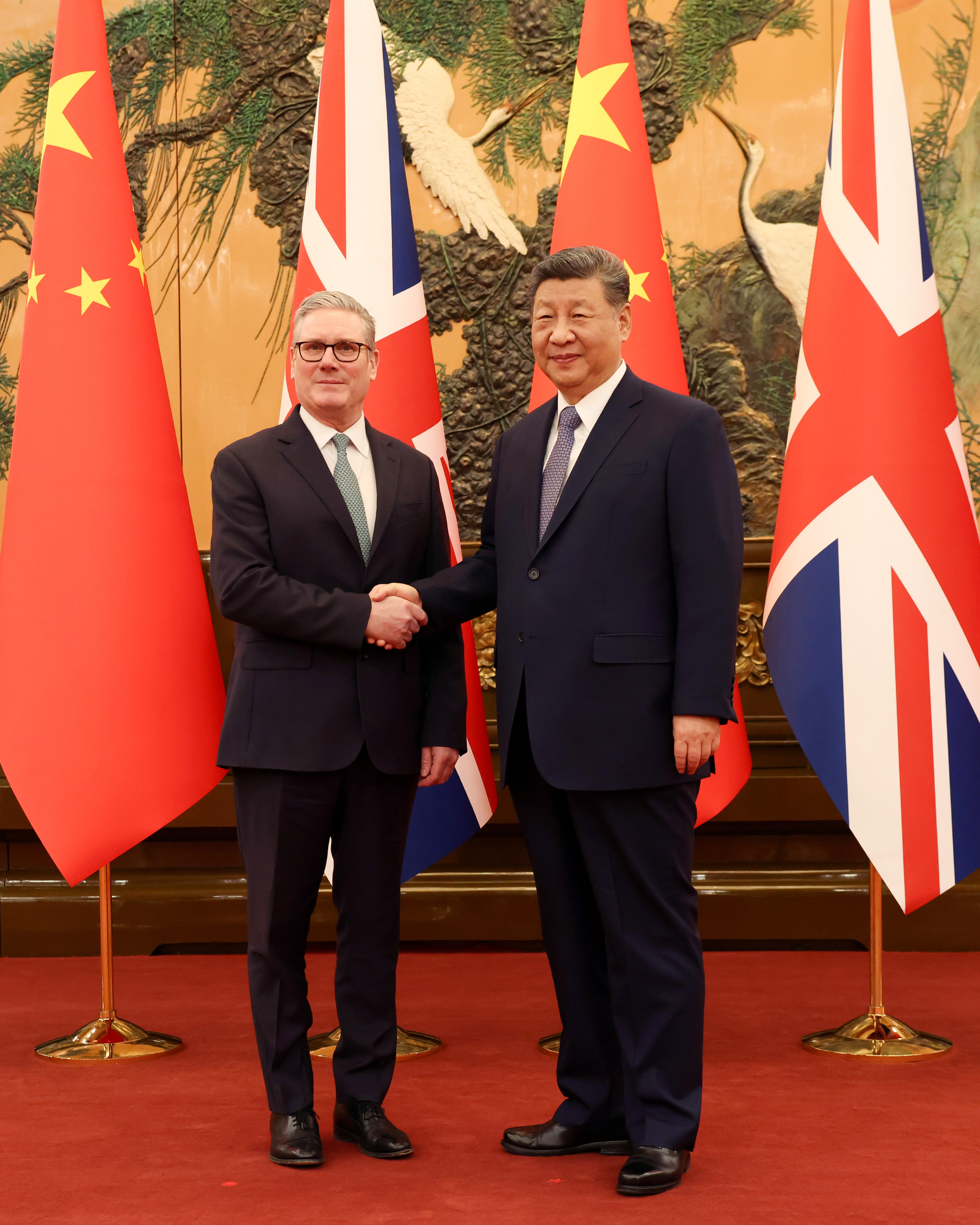
Starmer with Xi Jinping, January 2026

A "China spy case" that came to light in 2024 involving Christopher Cash, a former parliamentary researcher, and Christopher Berry collapsed in September 2025 after the Crown Prosecution Service (CPS) dropped charges under the Official Secrets Act. The two were accused of passing information harmful to UK interests between December 2021 and February 2023. Director of Public Prosecutions Stephen Parkinson said the case fell apart because the government failed to provide evidence that China was officially considered a national security threat at the time, as required under a 2025 legal precedent. Conservative leader Kemi Badenoch accused Starmer's government of withholding key evidence to appease China, while the government denied interference and blamed outdated laws and the previous administration's stance on China.

In 2017, Matthew Doyle campaigned for the re-election of Scottish Labour councillor Sean Morton, after Morton was charged with possessing and distributing indecent images of children in December 2016. Shortly after the Labour defeat in the 2021 Hartlepool by-election, Doyle was appointed the Labour Party Director of Communications on an interim basis under Starmer, with the role later becoming permanent. After Labour's victory in the 2024 general election, Doyle was appointed Downing Street Director of Communications and stepped down from the role in March 2025. Doyle was nominated by Starmer for a life peerage in December 2025 as part of the 2025 Political Peerages to sit in the House of Lords as a Labour peer; he was created Baron Doyle, of Great Barford in the County of Bedfordshire on 8 January 2026. Just weeks later, he was suspended by the party over his friendship with Morton.

===== Proposed disability benefits reforms =====
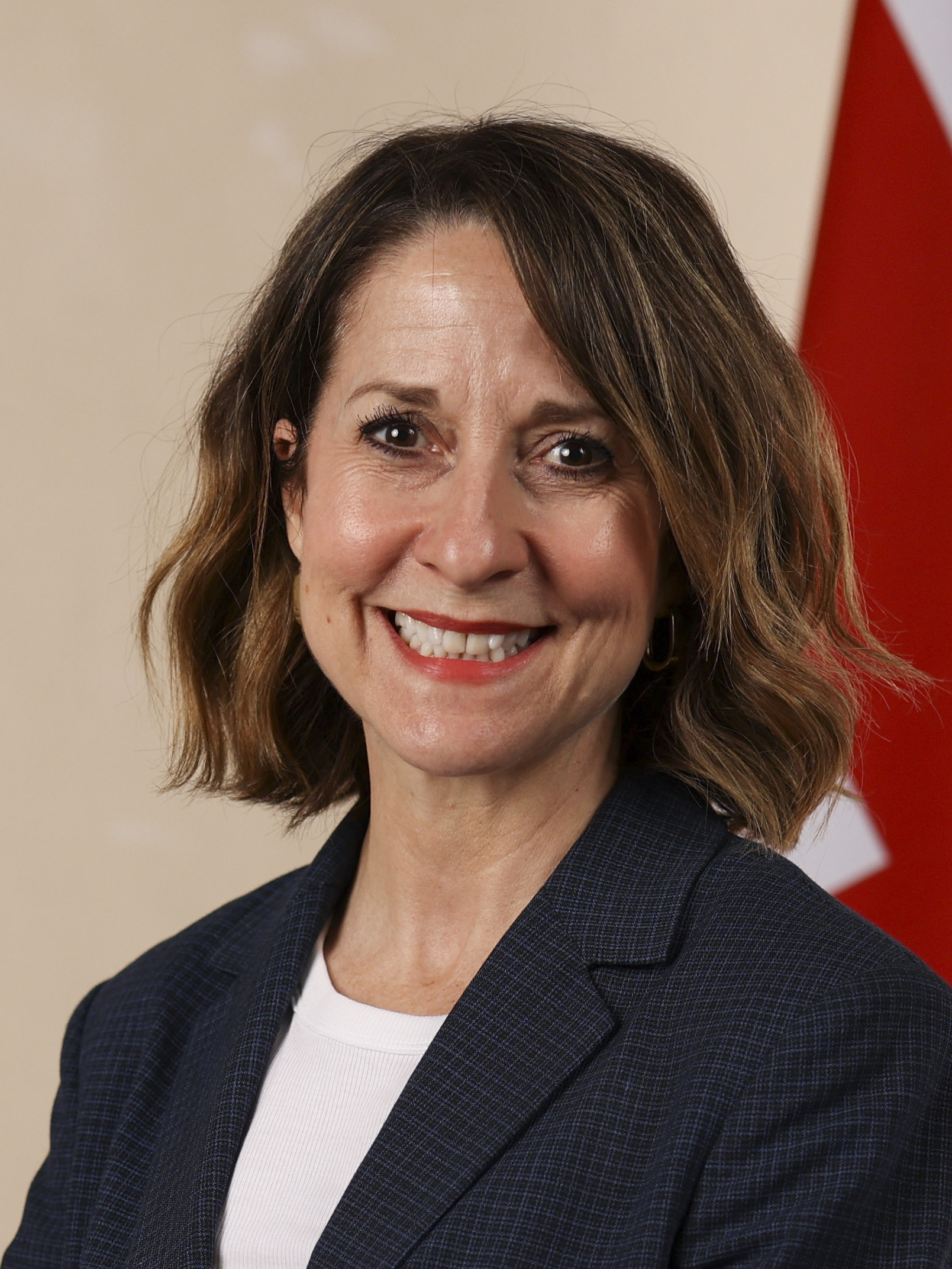
Liz Kendall, then Secretary of State for Work and Pensions

During her tenure as Work and Pensions Secretary, Liz Kendall initiated a series of reforms aimed at reshaping the UK's welfare system. One of her primary objectives was to shift the Department for Work and Pensions from merely administering benefits to actively promoting employment. In a speech in Barnsley, Kendall said the need to address factors such as health, skills, childcare, and transport, which significantly influence individuals ability to secure and maintain employment.

Kendall proposed the "Youth Guarantee" for 18 to 21-year-olds, designed to ensure that young people are either earning or learning. This program offers opportunities for training or employment, with the stipulation that refusal to participate could result in benefit reductions. Kendall noted the importance of early career engagement, saying that unemployment during youth can have long-term detrimental effects on job prospects and earning potential.

A significant aspect of Kendall's reform agenda involved tightening eligibility criteria for Personal Independence Payments (PIP) and incapacity benefits. These measures aimed to save approximately £5 billion annually by the end of the decade. The proposed changes were expected to affect around one million people, particularly those with mental health conditions and minor physical difficulties.

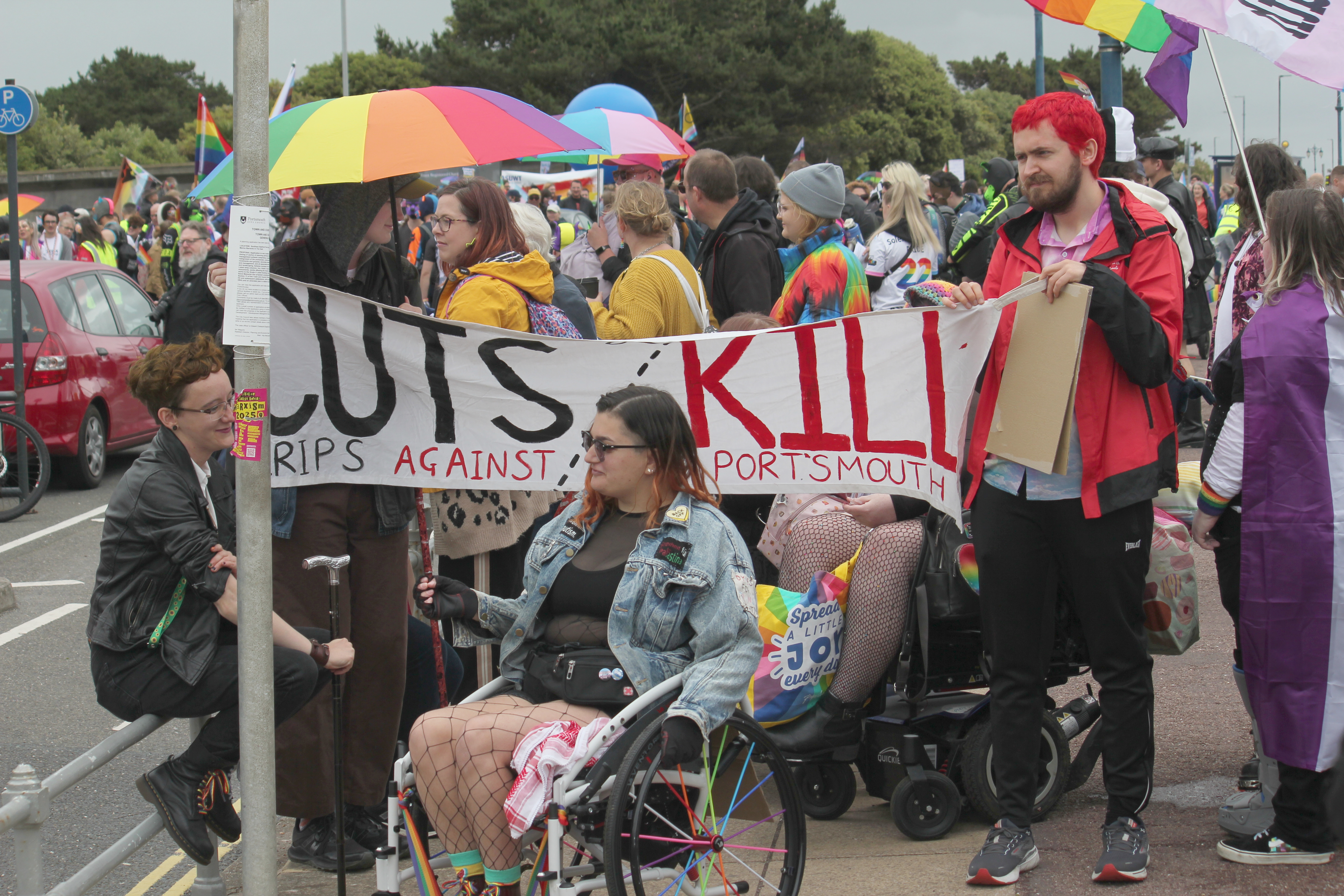
Protest against disability welfare cuts at Portsmouth Pride 2025

The proposed disability benefits reforms sparked considerable debate. Disability charities and opposition parties have criticized the cuts, labelling them as devastating and immoral. Organisations such as the Disability Benefits Consortium, Scope, and Mind argued that these changes could push disabled individuals further into poverty and exacerbate health issues, highlighting the potential social impact of the reforms.

In response to the backlash, Kendall emphasised the need for a balanced approach that ensures fiscal responsibility while protecting vulnerable populations. She acknowledges the concerns raised by disability advocates and noted the importance of reinvesting savings into employment programs to support those on health-related benefits, aiming to create a more equitable system.

Kendall's tenure was also marked by internal party challenges. Some Labour MPs expressed apprehension regarding the impact of welfare reforms on disadvantaged communities. The historical context of previous welfare cuts served as a cautionary backdrop, prompting calls for the party to uphold its commitment to social justice while pursuing necessary fiscal reforms. On 26 June 2025, the government, following extensive pressure from over 120 backbench Labour MPs, announced it would soften its plans for new welfare legislation by confirming that new qualification criteria for receiving Personal Independence Payment (PIP) and the health aspect of Universal Credit (UC) would only apply to prospective new claimants rather than pre-existing claimants who can continue to claim under the pre-existing qualification system.

===== Island of strangers speech =====
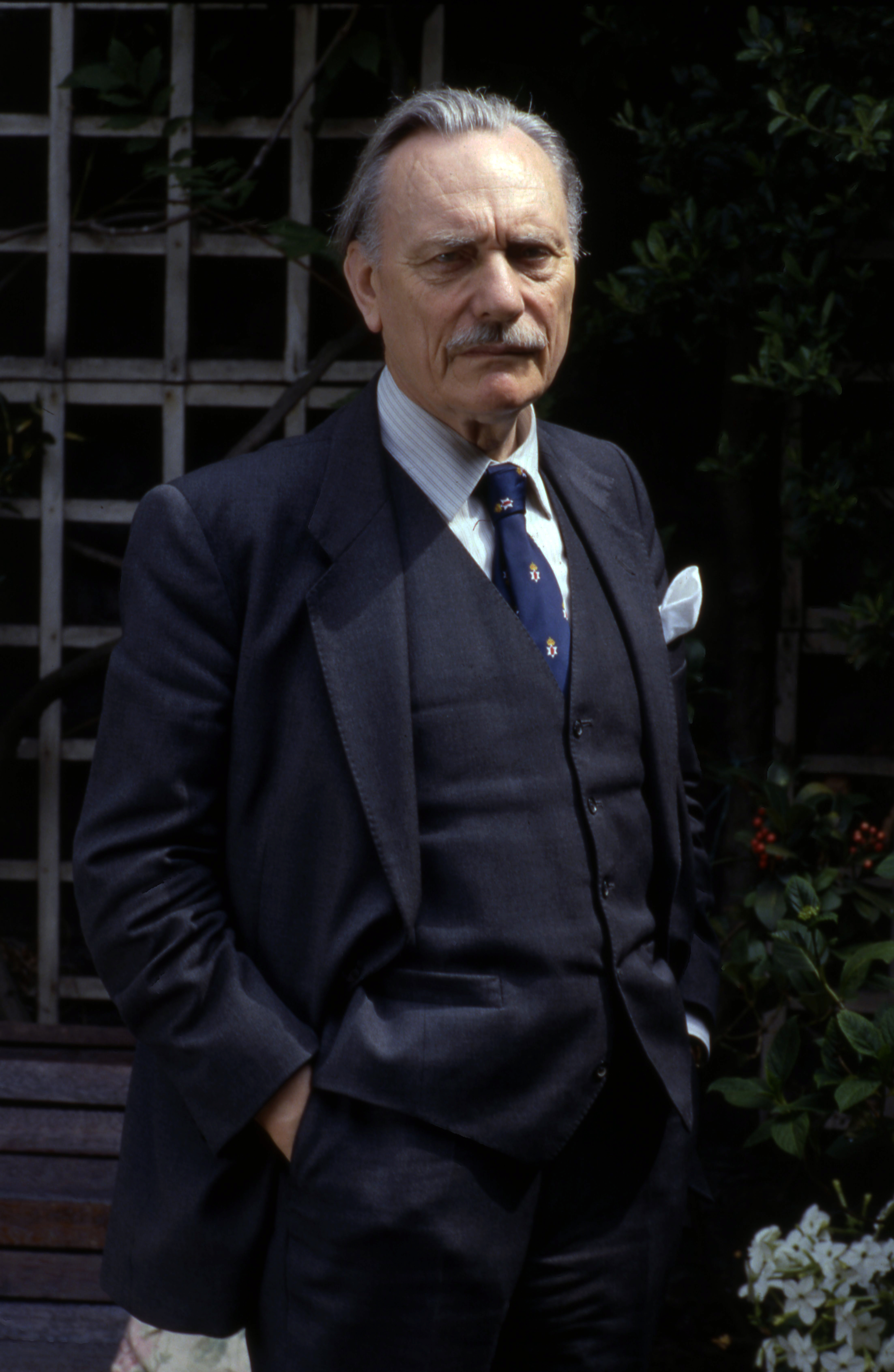
Enoch Powell, whose 1968 speech critics compared to Starmer's immigration remarks

Starmer's speech on 12 May 2025 outlining comprehensive reforms to UK immigration policy generated intense criticism over its language and rhetoric. According to media coverage, Starmer opened his remarks by pledging to "take back control of our borders and close the book on a squalid chapter for our politics, our economy, and our country". Media reports noted his deliberate use of "take back control" from the outset, making clear the intended audience and message. Political commentary highlighted Starmer's criticism of the previous Conservative government, with coverage noting he stated that between 2019 and 2023, "net migration quadrupled" and "reached nearly 1 million" in 2023. Media analysis noted he declared that "Taking back control is a Labour argument".

Most controversially, academic analysis by David Miller, professor of political theory at Nuffield College, Oxford, noted that Starmer warned that "Without them, we risk becoming an island of strangers, not a nation that walks forward together". According to media reports, Starmer described the UK's immigration system as contributing to forces "slowly pulling our country apart" while stating that immigrants "make a massive contribution" to British society. Political analysis noted that he characterised parts of the economy as "almost addicted to importing cheap labour".

Media analysis noted that the speech was "widely seen as a reaction to the results of the recent local elections, in which the right-wing and anti-immigration party Reform UK won 30% of the vote". Political observers noted that "close your eyes and Starmer's speech could have been delivered almost in its entirety by Reform UK leader Nigel Farage". Farage criticised the announcement, calling Starmer "a hypocrite who believes in open borders". Reform UK argued these reforms were merely a reaction to their own recent electoral gains and expressed doubt that the government would or could follow through with real results. In Parliament, Farage told Starmer that Reform "very much enjoyed your speech on Monday, you seem to be learning a very great deal from us". Academic researchers noted that Starmer's rhetoric "chimes with classic far-right narratives where migration is framed as the root of all societal ills". Analysis suggested the speech contained elements reminiscent of far-right conspiracies about elites deliberately encouraging mass immigration, with Starmer's words potentially acting as a "dog whistle".

The speech provoked intense divided reactions within Starmer's Labour Party. Diane Abbott, the veteran Labour MP, branded the speech "fundamentally racist", stating: "I was very disturbed to hear Keir Starmer on the subject of immigration... I thought that was a fundamentally racist thing to say. I think Keir Starmer is quite wrong to say that the way that you beat Reform is to copy Reform." The MP Nadia Whittome said that the speech "mimics the scaremongering of the far right," describing Starmer's words as "shameful and dangerous". Sarah Owen, Labour chairwoman of the Women and Equalities Select Committee, argued that the government should focus on "investing in communities to thrive – not pitting people against each other", warning that "chasing the tail of the right" could put the country on "a very dark path". Welsh Labour leader and Welsh First Minister Eluned Morgan stated that she did not want to be "drawn into a debate where people are using divisive language when it comes to immigration."

Other Labour MPs who criticised the speech included Zarah Sultana, who described the speech as "sickening" and tweeted: "The Prime Minister imitating Enoch Powell's 'Rivers of Blood' speech is sickening. That speech fuelled decades of racism and division. Echoing it today is a disgrace. It adds to anti-migrant rhetoric that puts lives at risk. Shame on you, Keir Starmer." She also questioned whether Starmer's speech had actually been written by Nigel Farage, asking: "Did Nigel Farage write this speech? Dehumanising and divisive. We deserve better than this." Former shadow chancellor John McDonnell, who lost the Labour whip, compared the "island of strangers" reference to "the divisive language of Enoch Powell" and questioned in Parliament: "When the prime minister referred to... an island of strangers, reflecting the language of Enoch Powell, does he realise how shockingly divisive that could be?" The MP Joani Reid stated that "we are not closing the door on immigration that can boost growth and strengthen the economy. But employers who hope to get away with paying low wages or avoid investment in staff training have had 'time' called today". The then Parliamentary Under-Secretary of State for Migration and Citizenship, Seema Malhotra, stated that Starmer's speech recognised "how much migration has been and remains a vital part of our identity," saying that unless immigration policy changed "we risk being communities that live side by side, rather than work and walk together." The then Home Secretary, Yvette Cooper, stated that Starmer was "right to say we need to change", adding that "I know that everybody always gets caught up in focusing on different phrases and so on, but we do have to be talking about the policies".

Media commentary described the phrase "island of strangers" as becoming "the locus for a vitriolic exchange of views," with critics reading it not as academic philosophy but as echoing Enoch Powell's Rivers of Blood speech, in which Powell championed those who "found themselves made strangers in their own country". Political analysis noted that critics accused Starmer of having "aped the infamous, racist 1968 'rivers of blood' speech of Powell". Critics drew direct parallels between the language used in both speeches. In Powell's 1968 address, he stated that white Britons "found themselves made strangers in their own country" as a result of immigration policies, warning of social breakdown and violence. Starmer's phrase "we risk becoming an island of strangers, not a nation that walks forward together" was seen as echoing this sentiment. One analysis noted that "Powell's speech suggests the levels of immigration would outnumber the white population of Britain and cause them to become 'strangers in their own country'" while Starmer warned that without immigration controls, Britain risks "becoming an island of strangers". The comparison drew criticism from various political figures. One media commentator argued that the speech was "pitched so far to the right that he even aped the infamous, racist 1968 'rivers of blood' speech".

Initially, the Prime Minister's Office rejected comparisons to Powell and defended use of the phrase, saying that Starmer was "using his own words to rightly both recognise the contribution migrants have made over generations and to make the point that uncontrolled migration has been too high". Starmer initially "completely rejected" the suggestion he echoed Powell. Starmer later expressed regret about the phrase. In an interview with his biographer, he admitted: "I wouldn't have used those words if I had known they were, or even would be interpreted as an echo of Powell. I had no idea – and my speechwriters didn't know either. But that particular phrase – no – it wasn't right. I'll give you the honest truth: I deeply regret using it." Starmer revealed that the speech came shortly after an alleged arson attack on his family home, stating: "It's fair to say I wasn't in the best state to make a big speech... I was really, really worried."

Analysis suggested the controversy had political consequences for Starmer. Research by the New Statesman found that the speech "backfired", showing "a drop in Labour support" with "no modelling scenario where we find the speech has any positive effect". The study found the speech made immigration 3 percentage points more salient and reduced support for all left-of-centre parties by 1.5 percentage points. The apology was described as "another climbdown from Number 10 amid backlash from MPs", with the controversy described as "yet another internal Labour dispute" over Starmer's political positioning on immigration.

===== Angela Rayner tax scandal =====
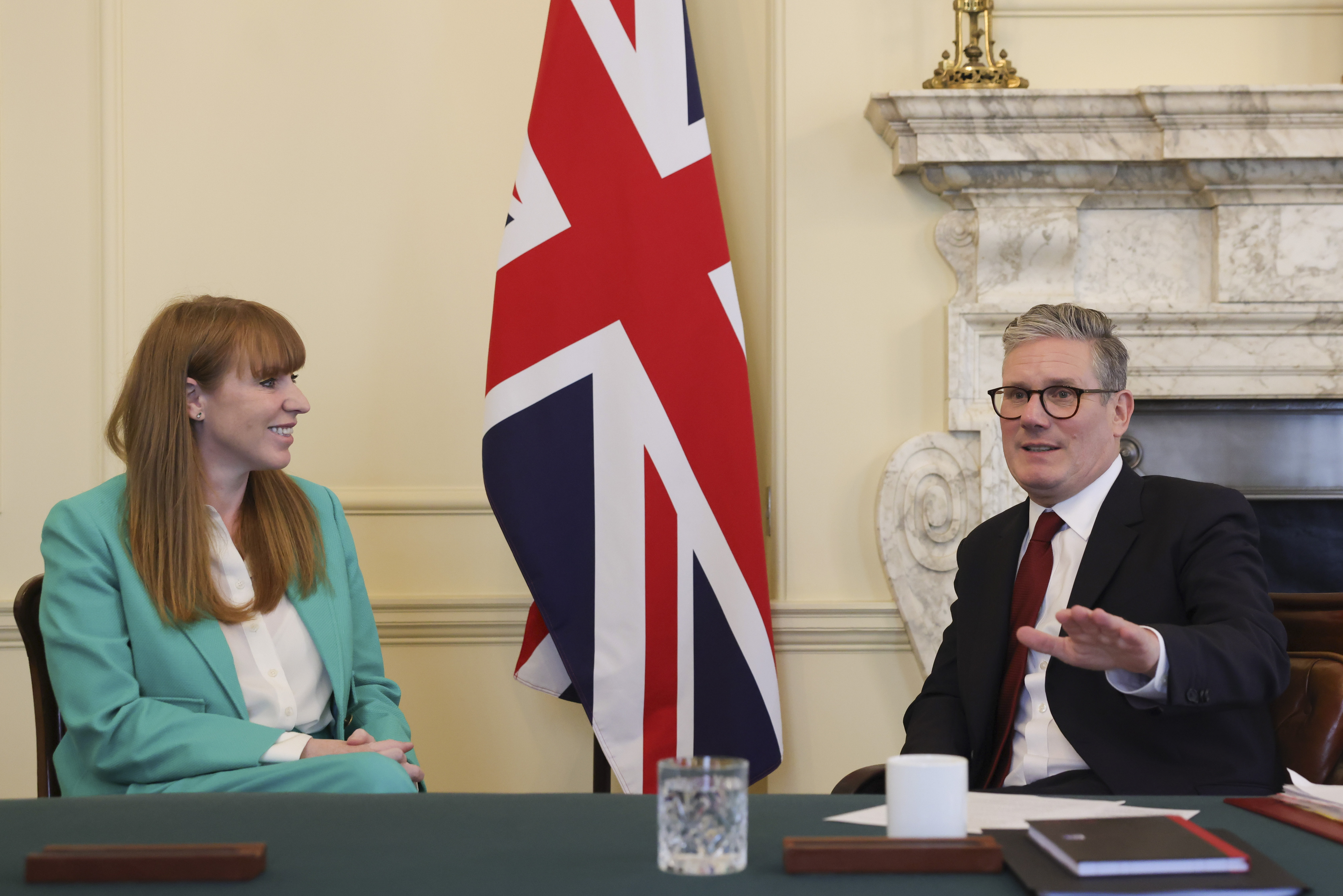
Angela Rayner resigned from government in response to the tax scandal in September 2025

A scandal erupted in 2025 when it was reported that Deputy Prime Minister Angela Rayner had underpaid stamp duty on a £800,000 flat in Hove purchased in May 2025. Rayner treated the property as her primary residence for stamp duty and related purposes. Her primary residence for the purposes of Council Tax remained her constituency home in Ashton-under-Lyne. This was reported in news media resulting in a payment of stamp duty, reported to £40,000 less than if it had not been her primary residence. Prior to the purchase, she had sold her 25% share in the Ashton-under-Lyne property to a trust for her disabled son, which already held a 50% share, and remains a trustee alongside her former husband and a solicitor; the remaining 25% is still owned by her former husband.

Following media scrutiny, on 3 September 2025 Rayner admitted to underpaying stamp duty and referred herself to the prime minister's independent adviser on ministerial standards. She stated she had acted on legal advice and believed she was liable only for the standard rate rather than the higher rate applied to additional properties. Rayner resigned from her ministerial posts and the deputy leadership of the Labour Party on 5 September 2025.

Rayner resigned in response to the scandal on 5 September 2025. Her resignation was widely described in the press as damaging to the Starmer ministry.

===== Peter Mandelson and Jeffrey Epstein friendship scandal =====
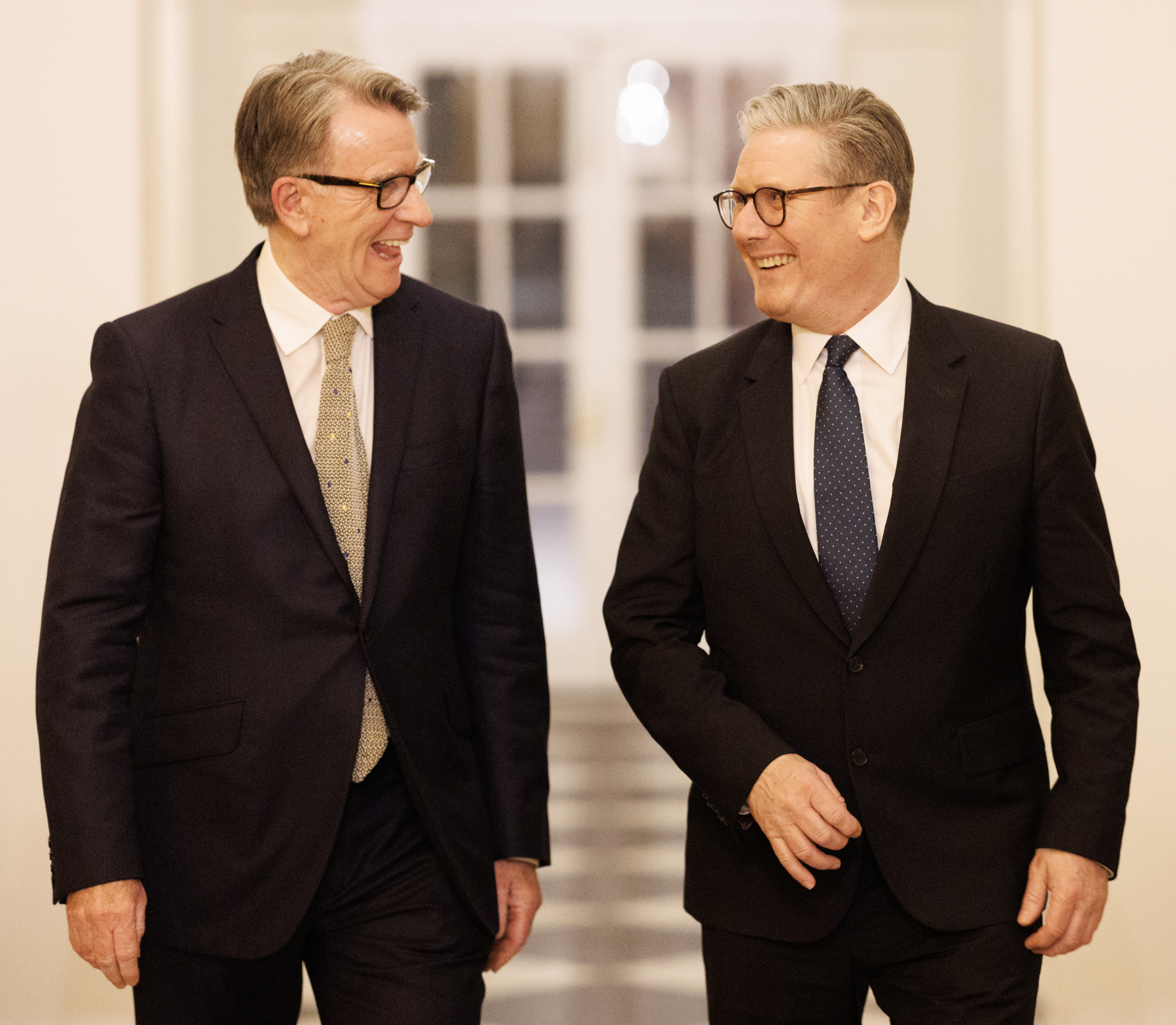
Peter Mandelson and Starmer in February 2025

In December 2024, the government announced prominent New Labour figure Peter Mandelson's appointment as the British Ambassador to the United States to strength their relationship with the incoming Trump administration. In September 2025, the extent of Mandelson's relationship with convicted child sex offender Jeffrey Epstein became widespread as the Epstein files were released. Starmer dismissed Mandelson, and said that he regretted appointing him. The prime minister's Chief of Staff and long-time Starmer ally Morgan McSweeney took responsibility for the appointment and resigned in February 2026. Tim Allan, the Director of Communications, resigned the following day.

In April 2026, it was reported that Mandelson had been denied security clearance by security vetting back in January 2025. A government spokesperson claimed "the decision to grant developed vetting to Peter Mandelson against the recommendation of UK Security Vetting was taken by officials in the FCDO". Starmer said he was not told that he had failed security vetting, and denied claims that he had misled the House of Commons. Foreign Secretary Yvette Coopersacked top civil servant in the Foreign Office Olly Robbins, who claimed he had been put under "serious pressure" to push through the appointment at a summons to the Foreign Affairs Select Committee. Leader of the Opposition Kemi Badenoch called Starmer's position "untenable", while the scandal prompted other party leaders to call for the prime minister's resignation, including Ed Davey, leader of the Liberal Democrats; Nigel Farage, leader of Reform UK; Zack Polanski, leader of the Greens; Liz Saville Roberts, leader of Plaid Cymru in Westminster; and John Swinney, the leader of the Scottish National Party and First Minister of Scotland.

===== 2026 Gordon and Denton by-election =====
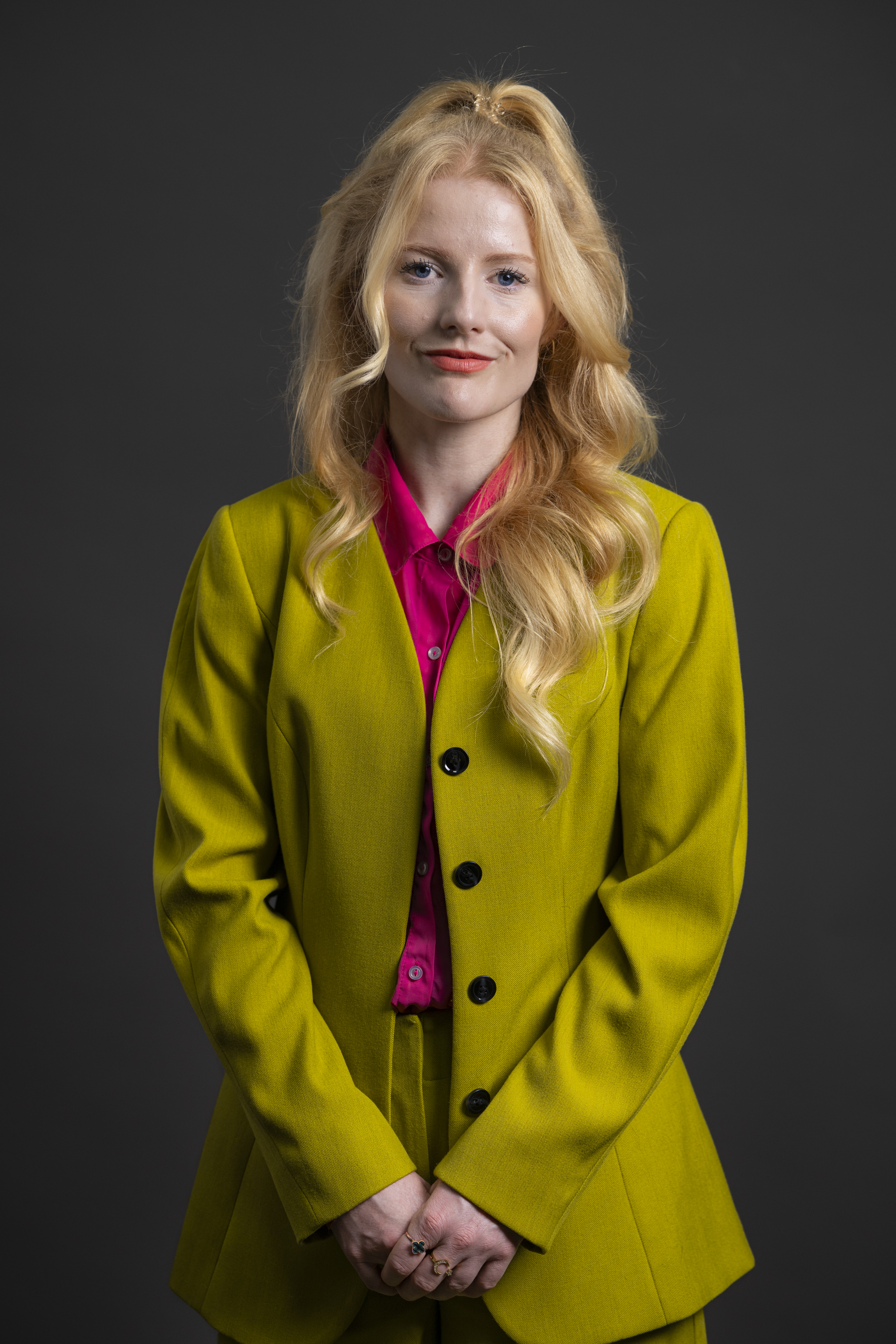
After Andy Burnham had his candidacy controversially blocked, the by-election was won by Green Party candidate Hannah Spencer, whom Burnham previously defeated in the 2024 Greater Manchester mayoral election

Following media and public speculation, Andy Burnham, the incumbent Mayor of Greater Manchester and former MP for Leigh, requested approval to stand as Labour's candidate in the Gordon and Denton by-election on 24 January. As a sitting directly elected mayor, the party's rules required him to seek the approval of the party's National Executive Committee (NEC) before putting himself forward for selection as a parliamentary candidate. The NEC met on 25 January and voted 8–1 against Burnham's candidacy. In the vote, NEC Chair and Home Secretary Shabana Mahmood abstained, Starmer voted against, and party Deputy Leader Lucy Powell voted for allowing Burnham to stand. Burnham expressed his disappointment and concern about the impact of the ruling for Labour in the 2026 United Kingdom local elections, the 2026 Scottish Parliament election and 2026 Senedd election. After the decision to block Burnham from standing as a Labour candidate, 50 Labour MPs and half a dozen Labour peers signed a letter objecting to the NEC's decision. This ultimately led to Hannah Spencer of the Green Party winning the by-election. After the by-election result, Burnham publicly congratulated Spencer on her "historic win," noting that he had been isolating with COVID-19 during the final stages of the campaign. Spencer has acknowledged Burnham's local popularity, stating that if he had been the candidate, she would have faced a "harder fight". Many commentators speculated that Burnham could have retained the seat for Labour, especially as he had previously beaten Spencer in the 2024 mayoral election.

The by-election had been framed by the media as a route for Burnham to return to Westminster and potentially challenge Starmer for the Labour leadership. Labour figures were reported to be concerned that Burnham's candidacy would trigger a by-election for the position of mayor, which would be expensive and politically risky for the party: MP Graham Stringer expressed his reluctance to let Reform UK "have a go" at winning the mayoralty. Burnham's application to stand in the by-election was supported by some senior Labour figures, including former deputy prime minister Angela Rayner, Mayor of London Sadiq Khan, Powell, and Energy Secretary Ed Miliband. Labour sources also stated concerns to the BBC about the prospect of a "divisive campaign". Andrea Egan, the general secretary of the trade union Unison, warned against any potential "stitch-up" in Labour's selection process. Mainstream, a group associated with Burnham, launched a petition to Mahmood calling for a "fair, democratic and open selection". Momentum also expressed support for Burnham's candidacy.

==== 2026 leadership crisis and resignation ====
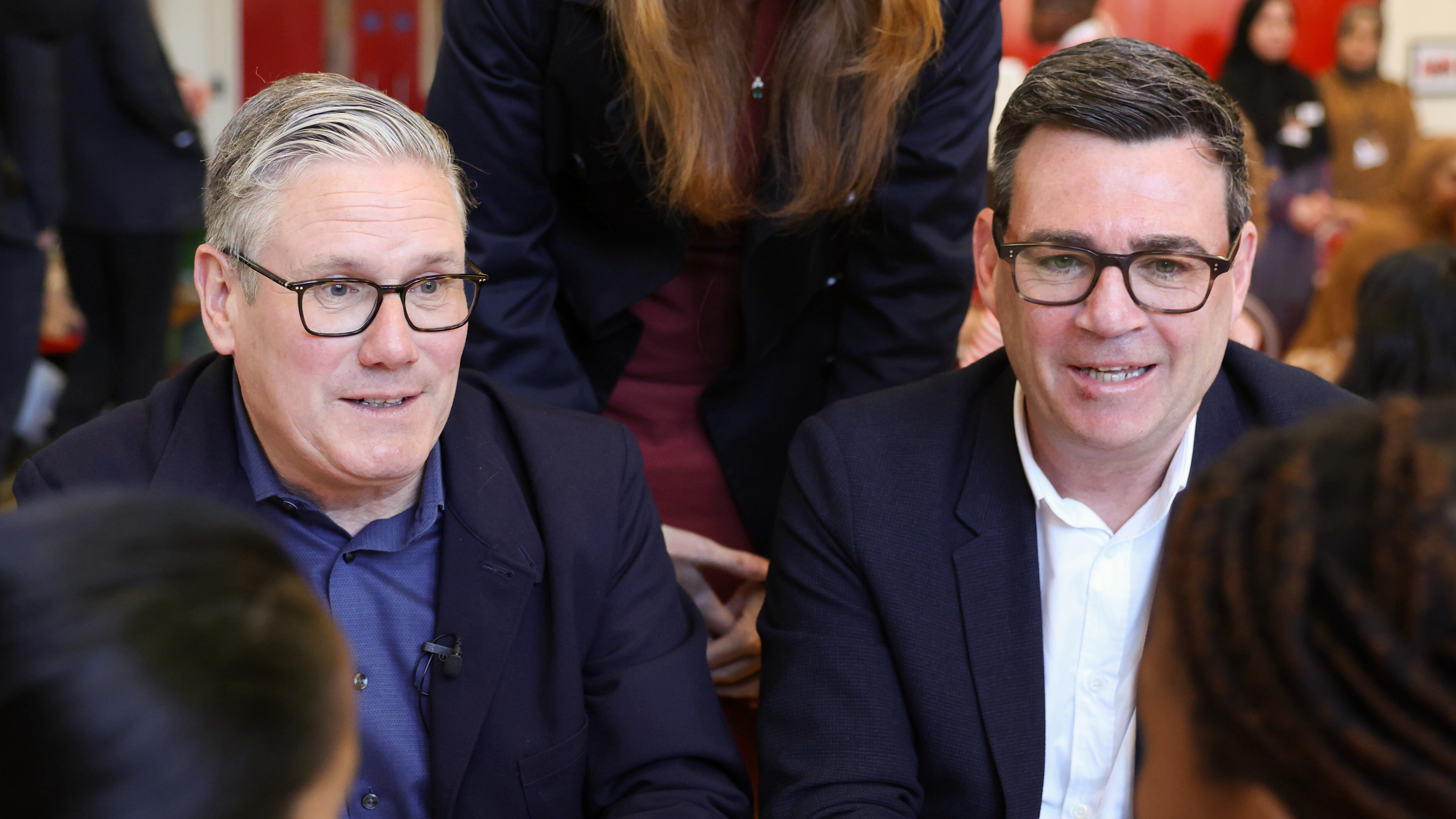
Keir Starmer (left) resigned as Prime Minister and was succeeded by Andy Burnham (right)

In early June 2026, Starmer faced a leadership and government crisis. It was caused by a historically poor result for the party at the 2026 local elections. By mid-May 2026, over 95 Labour MPs had called on Starmer to resign or set out a timetable for his departure, and one cabinet minister (Health Secretary Wes Streeting), four junior ministers (including Jess Phillips), and four ministerial aides resigned in protest. In June 2026, the crisis deepened following disputes over the government's planned defence spending, which resulted in four resignations in the Ministry of Defence: one cabinet minister (Defence Secretary John Healey), one junior minister (Al Carns), and two Parliamentary private secretaries: Rachel Hopkins and Pamela Nash). Two cabinet ministers were reported to be privately urging him to go. 103 MPs signed a joint statement defending Starmer's premiership in response to the crisis.

Potential leadership candidates widely speculated in the media to succeed Starmer as prime minister and Labour leader include Greater Manchester mayor Andy Burnham, former Health Secretary Wes Streeting, former deputy prime minister and housing secretary Angela Rayner, and former Labour leader and incumbent Energy Secretary Ed Miliband. Although he was highly critical of Starmer in his resignation letter, Streeting did not formally start a leadership challenge despite widespread media speculation he would do so. Later that day, Burnham announced his intentions to stand in the Makerfield by-election triggered by Josh Simons' resignation, having previously applied to be the Labour Party candidate in the 2026 Gorton and Denton by-election but having his candidacy blocked by the party's National Executive Committee, a decision that Rayner has since called a mistake. Burnham went on to win the by-election and rejoined Parliament.

Starmer announced his resignation outside 10 Downing Street on 22 June 2026. Burnham was nominated by over 90% of Labour MPs in the resulting leadership election, and was elected unopposed. He was appointed prime minister on 20 July

== Local election results and opinion polling ==
Approval ratings of Keir Starmer as Prime Minister

Starmer has been viewed unfavourably by the British public during his tenure as prime minister. Starmer's average approval rating fell from +5% after the election to -30% by January 2025 before levelling off until April 2025 when it began to decline further, reaching -46% by November that year. A poll by Ipsos indicates that Starmer is the most unpopular prime minister since Ipsos's records began in 1977. It found 13% of the public were satisfied with Starmer's job performance, 79% dissatisfied, giving a net approval rating of minus 66. Starmer's average net approval remained higher than Boris Johnson's during the Partygate scandal prior to his resignation as Conservative leader and prime minister, Jeremy Corbyn's when he resigned as Leader of the opposition and Labour leader, and Liz Truss' when she resigned as Conservative leader and prime minister. Starmer's unpopularity has been tied to poor results for Labour in the 2025 United Kingdom local elections. Likewise, the party has garnered poor polling numbers ahead of the 2026 United Kingdom local elections, 2026 Scottish Parliament election and 2026 Senedd election. An opinion-piece in Politico viewed this as a likely catalyst for a leadership challenge.

In September 2025, The Guardian reported that plans to replace Starmer had begun among groups of MPs. The reports were instigated by briefings to the media from Starmer's allies, which stated that he would resist any attempted challenge to his leadership. By November, further reports emerged that plans to replace Starmer with Wes Streeting could be enacted after the November 2025 United Kingdom budget; this ultimately did not occur. Shortly thereafter, Clive Lewis became the first Labour MP to publicly call for Starmer's resignation. A YouGov poll for The Times in February 2026 indicates that 51% of respondents thought Starmer was either more sleazy or as sleazy as Johnson. The poll found that 43% of participants did not think Starmer had handled the Mandelson scandal well; 23% thought that he had; 14% thought Starmer had shown good judgment in his handling of the affair.

On 9 February 2026, Scottish Labour Party leader Anas Sarwar held a press conference in Glasgow to publicly call for Starmer to resign. Sarwar stated that "the distraction needs to end and the leadership in Downing Street has to change," citing a series of "mistakes" that he believed were undermining Labour's prospects in the upcoming elections. Despite describing Starmer as a "decent man" and a "friend," Sarwar argued that his primary loyalty was to Scotland and that the prime minister's continued leadership was sabotaging the party's future. Sarwar revealed he had spoken to Starmer earlier that day to inform him of his decision, noting that the two had "disagreed" on the necessity of his resignation. In the immediate aftermath, senior Cabinet members including Lammy and Reeves rallied behind Starmer, emphasizing his mandate and urging party unity. Within Scottish Labour, the move caused significant friction; while Monica Lennon supported Sarwar's "leadership," others like former Scottish Secretary Ian Murray branded the call a threat to party stability. Opposition leaders John Swinney and Russell Findlay characterised the situation as "opportunism" and a "meltdown." Addressing the Parliamentary Labour Party later that evening, Starmer remained defiant, stating he had "won every fight I've ever been in" and refused to walk away.

Green Party candidate Hannah Spencer won the Gordon and Denton by-election by a majority of 4,402. Political scientist John Curtice called the result "seismic" and compared it on BBC TV with the 1962 Orpington by-election for its historic impact. It was triggered by the resignation of Andrew Gwynne, who was sitting as an independent following his suspension from the Labour Party. Gwynne said his resignation was due to "significant ill health", and advice from his doctor that it was unsafe for him to return to work. It was the second parliamentary by-election during Starmer's tenure as prime minister, after the 2025 Runcorn and Helsby by-election, which Reform UK candidate Sarah Pochin won. Candidates representing 11 parties were standing, but numerous commentators described it as a three-way race between Labour, the Green Party and Reform UK. Political scientist Robert Ford described the by-election as a "pollster's nightmare", with any of three parties being able to win. Turnout for the by-election was 47.62%, only fractionally down on the 2024 general election. Spencer won the by-election with a majority of 4,402 votes, defeating the Reform UK, with the Labour Party (which had held on in the region uninterruptedly since 1935) being reduced to a distant third position. She became the Green Party's fifth MP and first in the North of England. This was also the first ever parliamentary by-election win for the Greens.

== Ministry ==
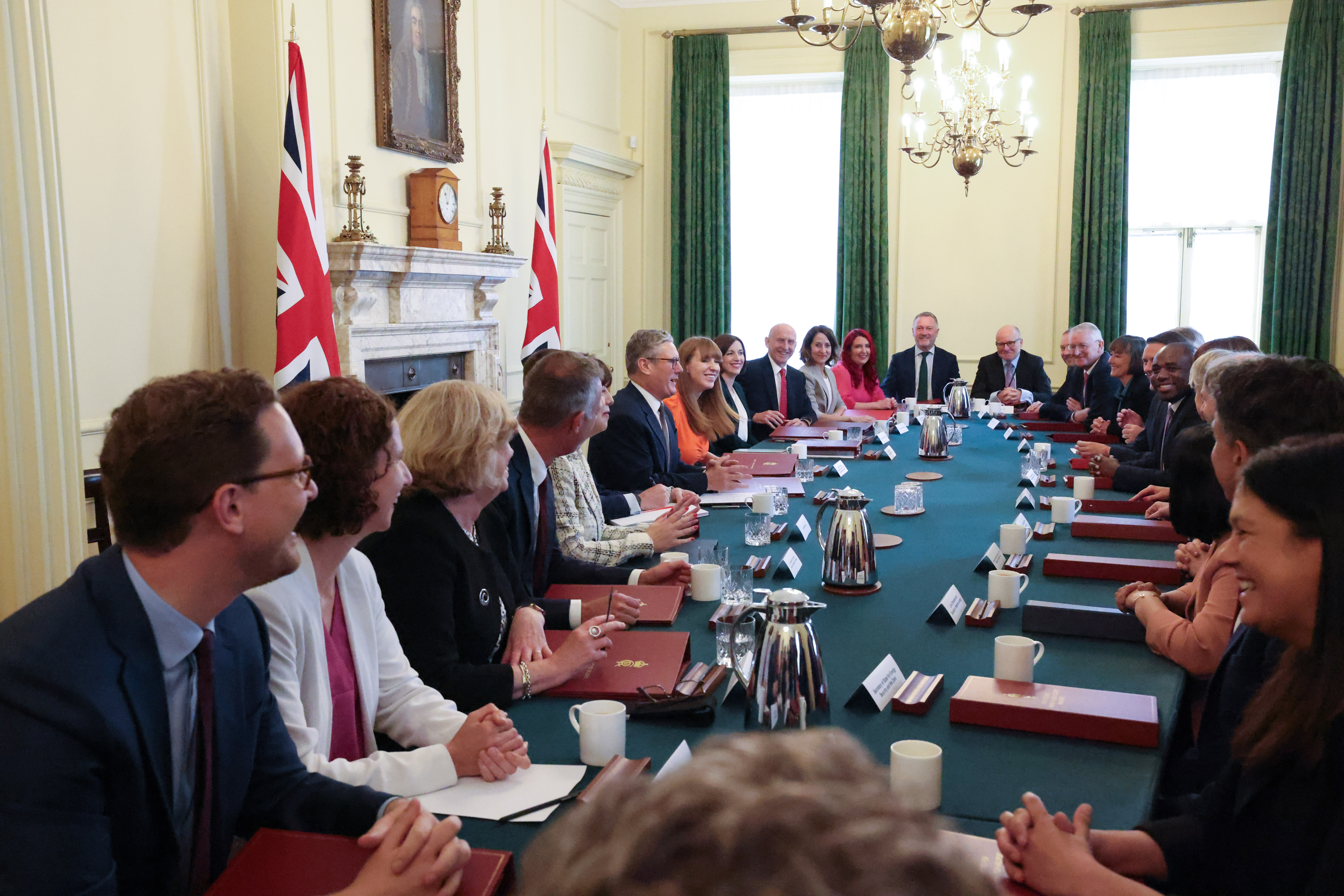
Starmer attending his first Cabinet meeting, 6 July 2024

Starmer formed his government throughout 5–7 July, after his party won 411 seats in the 2024 general election, with the new Cabinet first meeting on 6 July and the new Parliament being called to meet on 9 July. It has been noted for its female political representation, appointing women to a record half of the Cabinet (including Rachel Reeves as the first female Chancellor of the Exchequer in British history) and two of the five top positions in the British government, formerly including Angela Rayner as Deputy Prime Minister and Secretary of State for Housing, Communities and Local Government.

Starmer also appointed three politically independent experts: scientist Patrick Vallance as Minister of State for Science, rehabilitation campaigner James Timpson as Minister of State for Prisons, Parole and Probation, and international law expert Richard Hermer as Attorney General for England and Wales. The government includes a few ministers from the New Labour governments of Tony Blair and Gordon Brown, including Hilary Benn, Yvette Cooper, David Lammy and Ed Miliband in the Cabinet, and Jacqui Smith and Douglas Alexander as junior ministers.

=== Changes ===
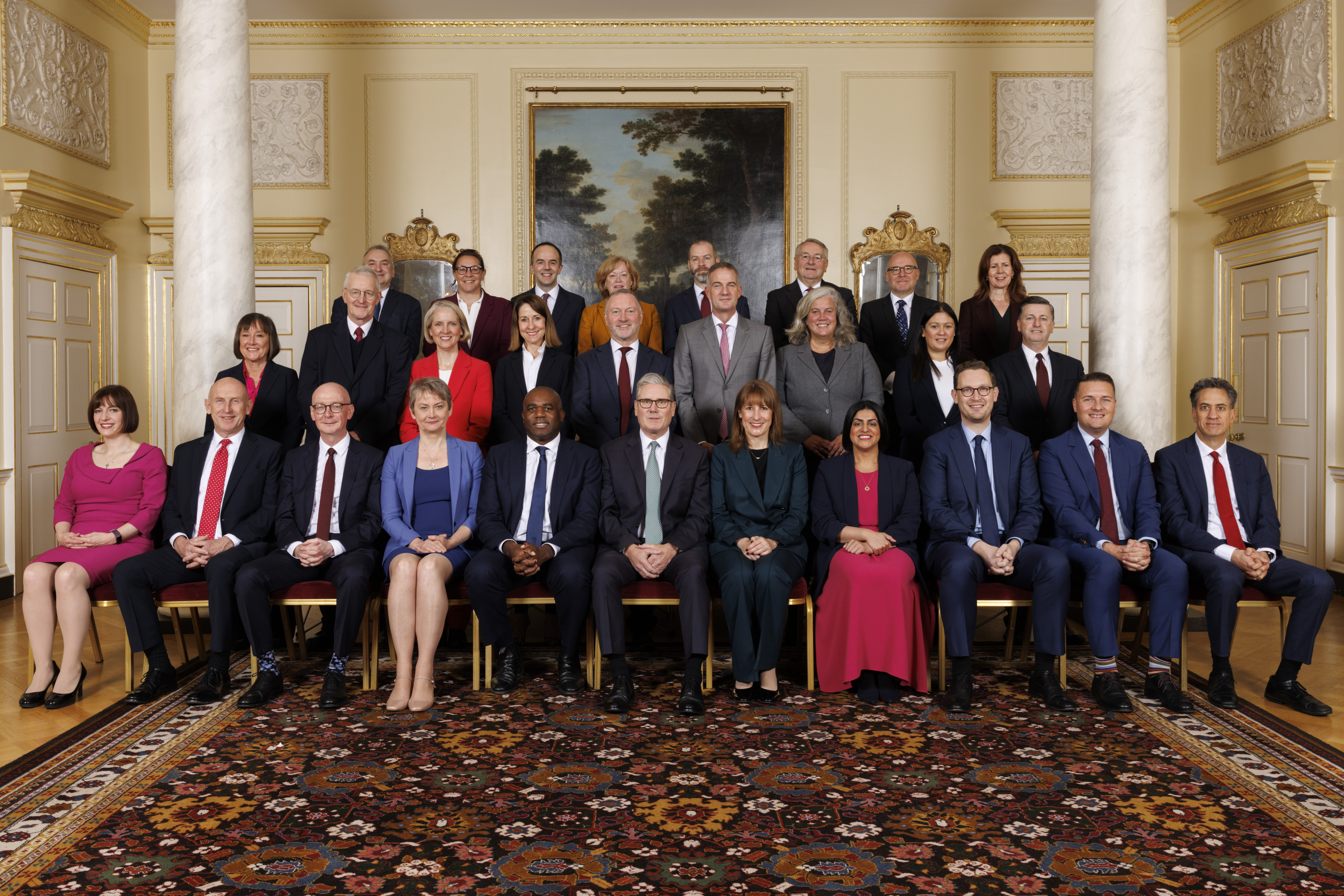
Starmer's reshuffled cabinet in October 2025

Changes from Starmer's final Shadow Cabinet to Cabinet.

- Thangam Debbonaire (Shadow Culture Secretary) lost her seat and Lisa Nandy was appointed in her place.
- Nandy's role (Shadow International Development Cabinet Minister) was a full member of Shadow Cabinet despite the department having merged into the Foreign Office under the previous government and not reformed by Starmer. Anneliese Dodds attends Cabinet as Minister of State for Development.
- Dodds served in Shadow Cabinet as Shadow Women and Equalities Secretary and party chair, and she is also the junior Minister of State for Women and Equalities, while Bridget Phillipson succeeds her as the senior Minister for Women and Equalities.
- Ellie Reeves (Deputy National Campaign Coordinator) was a member of Shadow Cabinet in her previous role that has no government counterpart, and was appointed to succeed Dodds' role as party chair and Minister without Portfolio outside Cabinet.
- Jonathan Ashworth (Shadow Paymaster General) lost his seat. Nick Thomas-Symonds (Shadow Minister without Portfolio) was appointed Minister for the Cabinet Office as well as Minister for the Constitution and European Union Relations, but will not attend Cabinet.
- Emily Thornberry (Shadow Attorney General) was not appointed to Cabinet nor any junior ministerial role and returned to the backbenches. Richard Hermer was appointed Attorney General from outside parliament and will be given a life peerage to the House of Lords to serve.
- Hermer (Attorney General), Alan Campbell (Commons Chief Whip) and Darren Jones (Chief Secretary to the Treasury) merely attend Cabinet, roles that were full members of the Shadow Cabinet.
- The Lord Kennedy of Southwark (Lords Chief Whip) was a member of Shadow Cabinet, but he was not appointed to Cabinet while remaining in the same role.

=== Departures ===
This is a list of departures from the Starmer ministry since forming a government on 6 July 2024.

==== Cabinet ====
Minister (Cabinet members shown in bold)	Office	Date of resignation	Reason
Louise Haigh	Secretary of State for Transport	29 November 2024	Resigned after admitting she had pleaded guilty to a criminal offence relating to misleading police in 2014
Angela Rayner	Deputy Prime Minister	5 September 2025	Resigned after special report released concluding that she was in violation of the Ministerial Code for underpaid property taxes

==== Non-ministerial appointments ====
Name	Office	Date of resignation	Reason
Sue Gray	Downing Street Chief of Staff	6 October 2024	Resigned amid intense commentary around her position
Peter Mandelson	British Ambassador to the United States	11 September 2025	Sacked following revelations about his ties to the convicted sex offender Jeffrey Epstein
Morgan McSweeney	Downing Street Chief of Staff	8 February 2026	Resigned amid internal pressure over his role in recommending Mandelson's appointment
Tim Allan	Downing Street Director of Communications	9 February 2026	Resigned following the resignation of McSweeney

== International prime ministerial trips ==
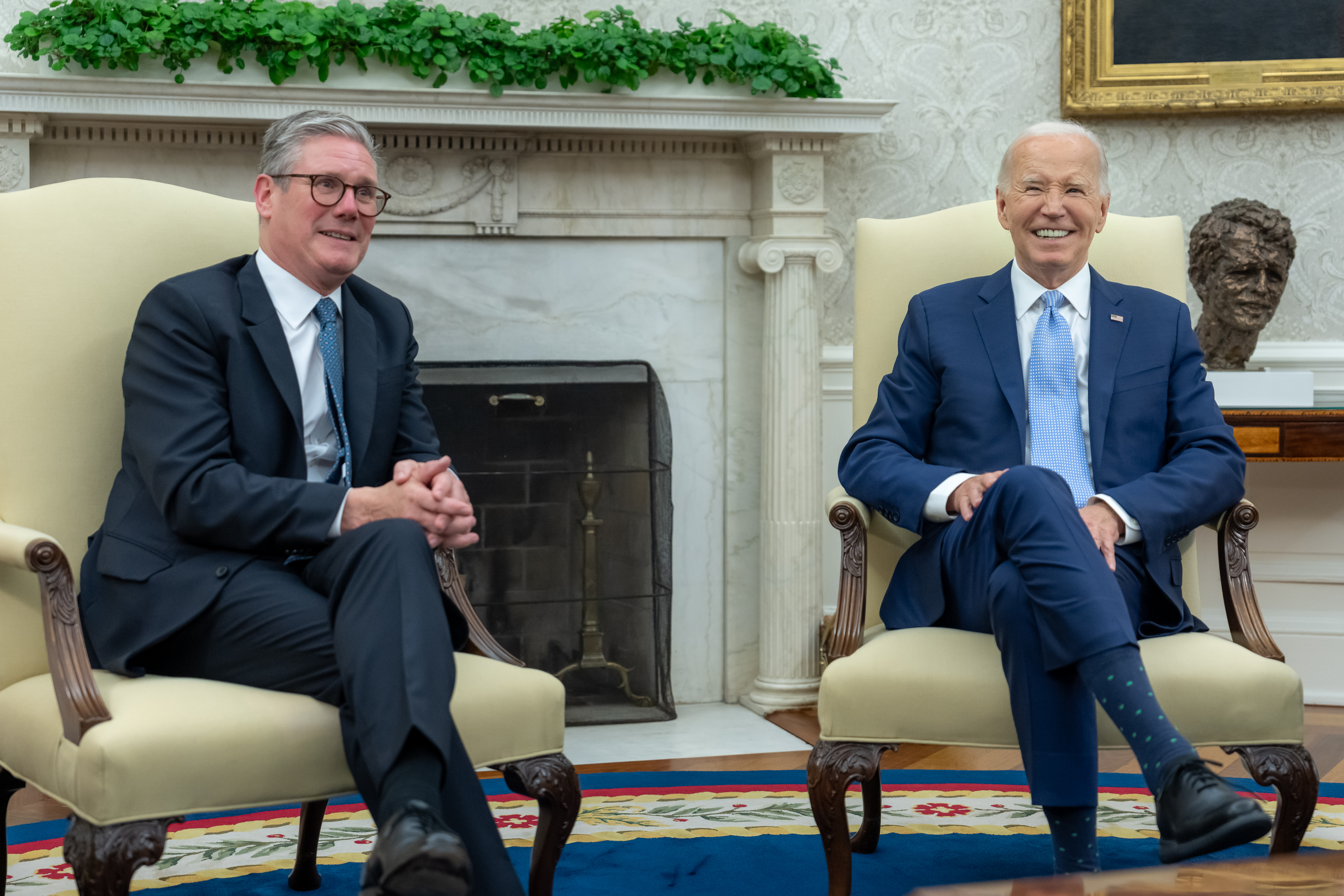
Starmer with President Joe Biden at the White House Oval Office in 2024

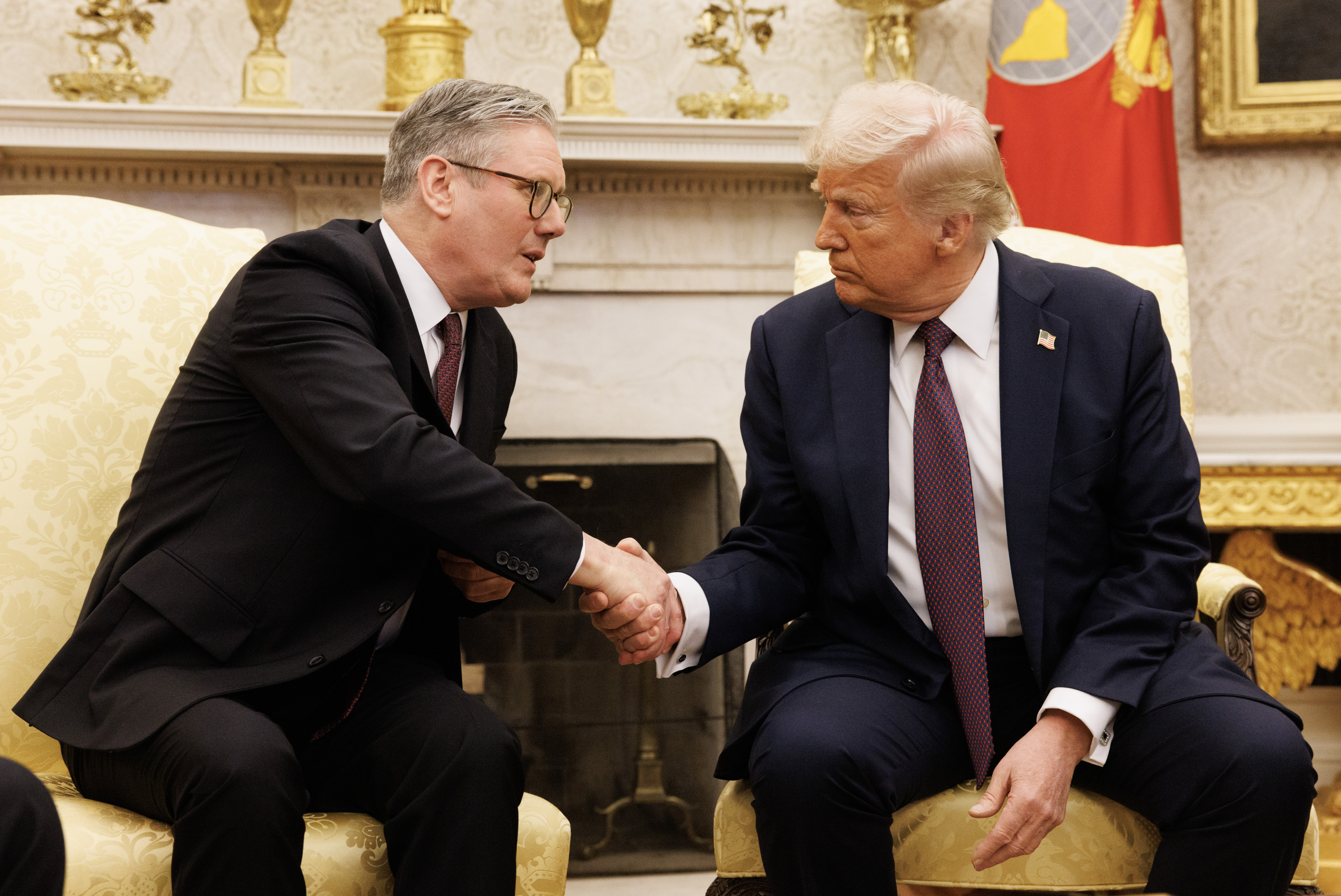
Starmer with President Donald Trump at the White House Oval Office in 2025

Starmer made 49 international trips to 33 countries and one British Overseas Territory during his premiership. The number of visits per country:

- One visit to Akrotiri and Dhekelia, Albania, Armenia, Azerbaijan, Bahrain, Canada, China, Cyprus, Denmark, Egypt, Estonia, Finland, Hungary, India, Japan, the Netherlands, Poland, Qatar, Samoa, South Africa, Switzerland, and the Vatican City
- Two visits to Belgium, Brazil, Ireland, Italy, Norway, Saudi Arabia, Turkey, and the United Arab Emirates
- Three visits to Ukraine
- Five visits to the United States
- Seven visits to Germany
- Nine visits to France

== Notes ==
British premierships
Preceded by Sunak	Starmer premiership 2024–2026	Succeeded by Burnham
