= Colm O'Kane =

Northern Irish trade unionist (1935–2005)

Colm Sean O'Kane (1935 – 14 June 2005) was a trade unionist from Northern Ireland.

Born in County Londonderry, O'Kane studied at St Columb's College alongside John Hume. He then became a mental health nurse, working at Purdysburn Hospital in Belfast, then worked at Darenth Park Hospital in Kent, with people with learning disabilities. Finally, he worked at Aston Hall Hospital in Derbyshire.

O'Kane became active in the Confederation of Health Service Employees (COHSE), and from 1964 worked for the union full-time as a regional secretary. He was promoted to become a national officer in 1974, then in 1987 he ran to become general secretary of the union, losing to Hector MacKenzie. Instead, he won election as the union's deputy general secretary, and also won a place on the Labour Party's National Executive Committee.

O'Kane was re-elected unopposed as deputy general secretary of COHSE in 1992, and then led the negotiations with the National and Local Government Officers' Association and National Union of Public Employees which formed Unison. He served as joint deputy general secretary of Unison until his retirement in 1994. In 2000, he began suffering with motor neurone disease, and he died of the condition five years later.

Trade union offices
Preceded by Hector MacKenzie	Deputy General Secretary of the Confederation of Health Service Employees; 1987–1993	Succeeded by Position abolished
Preceded by New position	Deputy General Secretary of Unison; 1993–1994; With: Dave Prentis and Tom Sawyer	Succeeded by Dave Prentis
