= Rodney Bickerstaffe =

British trade unionist

- Bickerstaffe at Russell Square, London, in 2015

Second President of the National Pensioners Convention
- In office 2001–2005
- Preceded by: Jack Jones
- Succeeded by: Frank Cooper

2nd General Secretary of UNISON
- In office 1996–2001
- Preceded by: Alan Jinkinson
- Succeeded by: Dave Prentis

General Secretary of the National Union of Public Employees
- In office 1982–1993
- Preceded by: Alan Fisher
- Succeeded by: organisation abolished

President of the Trades Union Congress
- In office 1992
- General Secretary: Norman Willis
- Preceded by: Alec Smith
- Succeeded by: Alan Tuffin

Personal details
- Born: 6 April 1945 Hammersmith, London, England
- Died: 3 October 2017 (aged 72) Camden, London, England
- Spouses: Anne Hollis (m. 1968, divorced) Patricia Colpus (m. 1973)
- Children: 4
- Education: Rutherford College of Technology
- Occupation: Trade unionist

Rodney Kevan Bickerstaffe (6 April 1945 – 3 October 2017) was a British trade unionist. He was General Secretary of the National Union of Public Employees (1982–1993) and UNISON (1996–2001), Britain's largest trade union. He later became president of the UK National Pensioners Convention (2001–2005).

== Early life and education ==
Born on 6 April 1945 in Hammersmith, London to Elizabeth Bickerstaffe, from South Yorkshire, who had been finishing her nursing training at Whipps Cross hospital in the heavily bombed East End during the Blitz. She had a brief romance with a carpenter from Dublin who returned to Ireland and ceased all contact. She and her son lived for three years in east London in a home for unmarried mothers. He then moved to Doncaster among extended family. He was educated at Doncaster Grammar School and in sociology at Rutherford College of Technology.

Much later, in the 1990s, Bickerstaffe's quest to find his birth father finally led to his mother revealing his father's possible whereabouts. Rodney discovered that his father, Thomas Simpson, had died in 1991 but Bickerstaffe subsequently discovered three Irish half-brothers.

== Career ==
Bickerstaffe became an organiser for the National Union of Public Employees (NUPE) in 1966 in Yorkshire, rising through the ranks to be divisional officer of the northern division. He then became national officer responsible for members working in local government, universities and the water industry. During the 1978–79 Winter of Discontent he was particularly known for his militancy on behalf of government workers; some other trade unionists blamed him for Margaret Thatcher's subsequent election. Despite that criticism, he told historian Tara Martín López in 2006 that "if I had to do it all over again today, I would do it all over again."

In 1981 he was appointed NUPE general secretary. When NUPE, COHSE and NALGO merged to create UNISON in July 1993, Bickerstaffe became associate general secretary. He was elected general secretary in November 1995, taking office on 28 February 1996.

Bickerstaffe was a popular and highly visible trade union leader, calling for better rights and fairer treatment for staff working in public services and those transferred to the private sector through national and local privatisations. Although he was not known for aggressive tactics, he was passionate in his campaigns against low pay and for the introduction of the statutory national minimum wage. At the 2000 Labour Party Conference he moved the successful though controversial resolution to ensure pensions are uprated in line with earnings or prices, whichever is higher.

At the 2004 Labour Party Conference, Tony Blair referred to Bickerstaffe during his keynote leader's speech, at which point he was heckled. "I thought, that's funny – no-one boos Rodney Bickerstaffe", Blair later quipped.

== Post-retirement ==
He retired from UNISON in 2001 and succeeded Jack Jones as president of the National Pensioners Convention in April 2001. The organisation champions the rights and voice of Britain's millions of pensioners and campaigns for better pensions and healthcare. Bickerstaffe stood down in 2005 to focus on his international commitments and was succeeded by Frank Cooper. He chaired the Global Network which works with organisations in Asia, Africa and Latin America and was President of War on Want. He also chaired the Ken Gill Memorial Fund, a non-charitable trust established to commemorate his late friend, the British trade unionist and internationalist Ken Gill. In 2007, he refused a peerage.

He was involved in fighting discrimination of all kinds and was a patron of the Dalit Solidarity Network, an organisation in London (UK) for opposition to the oppression of India's caste system.

== Honours ==
Bickerstaffe had honorary doctorates from Keele University, the University of Hertfordshire and Sheffield Hallam University as well as the Freedom of the Borough from Doncaster metropolitan borough.

== Personal life ==
On 18 May 1968, Bickerstaffe married Anne Margaret Hollis. The marriage was dissolved soon after, and on 14 July 1973 Bickerstaffe married Patricia Ann Colpus; they had four children.

Bickerstaffe died of oesophageal cancer on 3 October 2017, at the Marie Curie Hospice in Camden, London aged 72.

== See also ==
- List of people who have declined a British honour

Trade union offices
Preceded by Alan Fisher	General Secretary of the National Union of Public Employees; 1982–1993	Succeeded by Position abolished
Preceded by Alec Smith	President of the Trades Union Congress; 1992	Succeeded by Alan Tuffin
Preceded by Alan Jinkinson	General Secretary of UNISON; 1996–2001	Succeeded by Dave Prentis
Preceded by Jack Jones	President of the National Pensioners Convention; 2001–2005	Succeeded by Frank Cooper
