= Archi Times =

Archi Times is the only architectural monthly publication in Pakistan. The magazine was started in 1986. The monthly is published in English, and is based in Karachi.

Archi Times is widely circulated to architects, planners, engineers, builders and developers, contractors, interior designers, building materials manufactures and other senior management's in building civil engineering, public works design and construction and government department. It is also circulated internationally to, France, USA, USSR, Canada, Switzerland, Sri Lanka, Australia, Germany, India and Middle East, etc. It is also circulated to relevant international funding agencies like, UIA, SIA, AIA, RIBA, ICSIS, ICOGRADA, etc. and to the international libraries.

== See also ==
- List of architecture magazines
