= Alison Shepherd =

British trade unionist

Alison Shepherd (born 1950 or 1951) is a British former trade unionist.

Born in Shrewsbury, Shepherd worked at Middlesex University as an administrator. She joined the National and Local Government Officers Association (NALGO), and in 1983, she became the union's national negotiator for higher education. In 1989, she was elected as chair of the union's higher education executive committee. When NALGO merged into Unison, in 1993, she retained the same post.

In 1998, Shepherd was elected as president of Unison. She later chaired the union's international committee. She represented the union on the General Council of the Trades Union Congress (TUC) for over a decade, and was President of the TUC in 2006/2007.

Trade union offices
Preceded by John McFadden	President of Unison; 1998–1999	Succeeded by Anne Picking
Preceded by Gloria Mills	President of the Trades Union Congress; 2006–2007	Succeeded by Dave Prentis
