= Frank Lynch (trade unionist) =

British trade union leader and politician

Francis Joseph Lynch (15 March 1909 – 10 May 1980) was a British trade union leader and politician.

Lynch was active in the Labour Party from an early age, and served on the City of Salford council from 1934 until 1949. In 1937, he found work as a night patrolman and stoker at the County Mental Hospital in Prestwich, and joined the Hospital and Welfare Services Union. In 1946, this became part of the Confederation of Health Service Employees (COHSE), and Lynch became a full-time organiser for the new union. In 1948, he was appointed as a regional secretary, then in 1954 he became a national officer, and in 1967 was elected as the union's assistant general secretary.

Lynch was elected as general secretary of COHSE in 1969, and set himself a target of doubling the union's membership of 69,000. He achieved this; when he retired, in 1974, membership had risen to 230,000.

Trade union offices
Preceded by Dick Akers	Assistant General Secretary of the Confederation of Health Service Employees; 1967–1969	Succeeded by Albert Spanswick
Preceded by Dick Akers	General Secretary of the Confederation of Health Service Employees; 1969–1974	Succeeded by Albert Spanswick
