= Gloria Mills =

British trade union official

Gloria Mills CBE
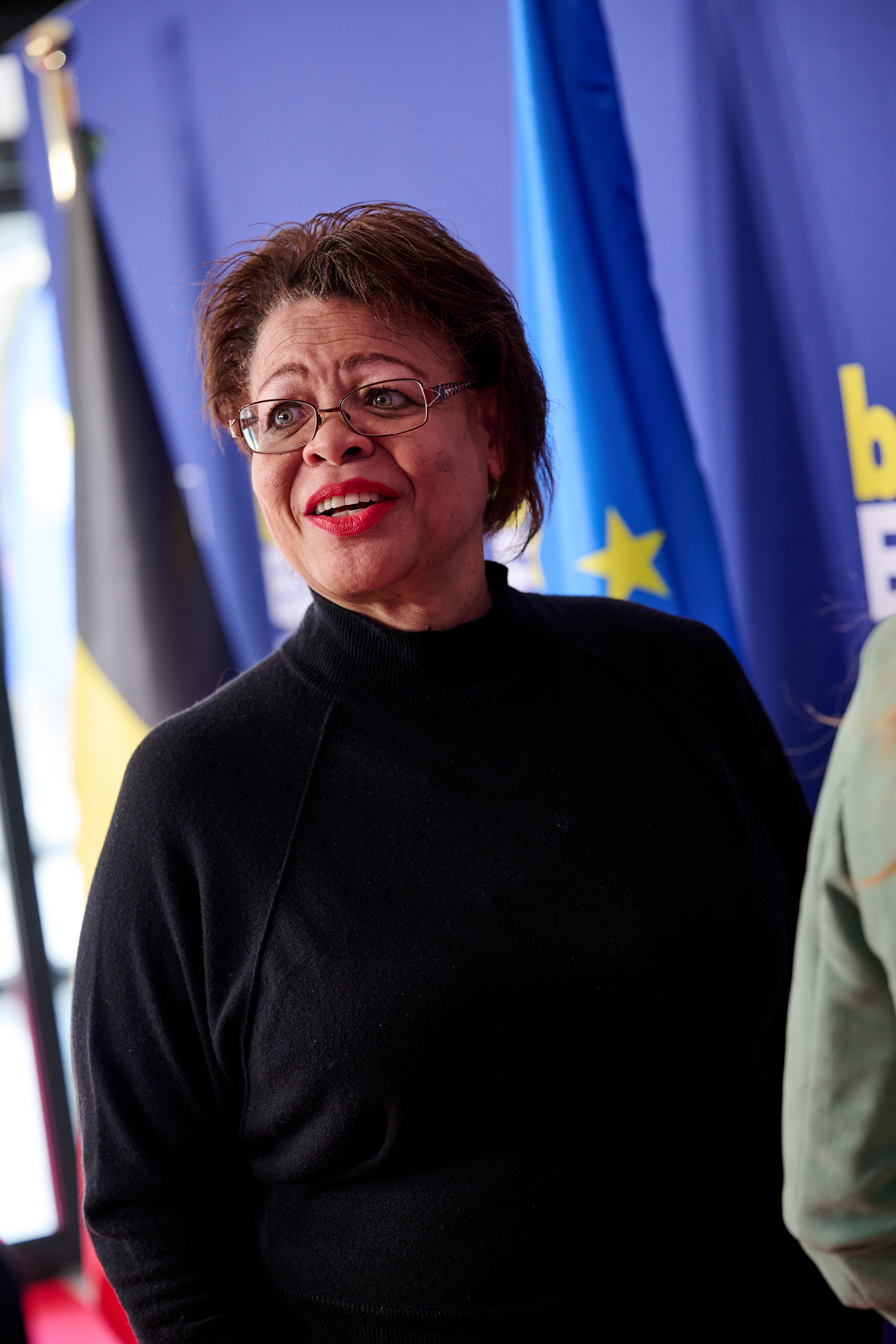
- Gloria Mills in 2024.

President of the Trades Union Congress
- In office 2005–2006
- Preceded by: Jeannie Drake
- Succeeded by: Alison Shepherd

Personal details
- Born: Gloria Helenly Mills
- Party: Labour
- Education: Open University
- Profession: Trade unionist

Gloria Helenly Mills CBE is a British trade union official.

== Education ==
Mills has a Master of Business Administration degree from the Open University, in addition to an honorary degree from Staffordshire University.

== Career ==
Mills worked in legal publishing, where she joined the National Society of Operative Printers and Assistants. She was elected as Mother of the Chapel, representing other trade unionists at her workplace, before taking a full-time post with the Society of Graphical and Allied Trades. In 1985, she moved to work for the National Union of Public Employees (NUPE) as an area officer in the London Division, before being promoted to a national officer post responsible for equalities work within the union.

In 1993, NUPE merged with two other unions to form Unison, and Mills became its director of equal opportunities. Two years later, she was elected to the General Council of the Trades Union Congress (TUC), also serving on its executive committee from 2000, chairing its race committee and sitting on its women's committee. She was elected as President of the Trades Union Congress from 2005 to 2006.

Mills has been active with the European Trade Union Confederation, and was elected as president of its women's committee in 2015.

Mills also served on the Commission for Racial Equality. She has been active in the Labour Party over many years and is a National Executive Member of BAME Labour.

== Honours ==
Mills was made a Member of the Order of the British Empire in 1999, and she was appointed a Commander of the Order of the British Empire (CBE) in the 2005 New Year Honours, for "services to equal opportunities".

Trade union offices
Preceded by Jeannie Drake	President of the Trades Union Congress; 2005/06	Succeeded by Alison Shepherd
