= Levi Hill (trade unionist) =

Levi Hill CBE
- Born: Levi Clement Hill; 26 May 1883; Bolton, Lancashire, England
- Died: 4 September 1961 (aged 78); Oxford, England

Levi Clement Hill CBE (26 May 1883 – 4 September 1961) was a British local government officer who became the first General Secretary of the National Association of Local Government Officers (NALGO), from 1909 until 1943. Though now regarded as a trade union leader, Hill said in 1910 that "anything savouring of trade unionism is nausea to the local government officer and his Association."

Born in Bolton, Lancashire, he worked as a clerk in the County Borough of Bolton treasurer's department. He became secretary of the authority's staff association, the Bolton Municipal Officers' Guild, and, from 1906, a delegate to NALGO's national executive council (NEC) chaired by Herbert Blain. When the NEC decided to appoint a full-time secretary, Hill's name was put forward by his Bolton colleague, Jabez Darricotte, and he was duly appointed, starting in March 1909. Hill encouraged the growth of the national organisation through the formation of new local guilds and mergers with other organisations; established its first permanent office; and edited a monthly newsletter, The Municipal Officer. He encouraged the establishment of Whitley Councils in local government, bringing together employers and staff representatives to consider issues of pay and conditions of service. According to NALGO's official history, Hill gave the Association "every ounce of his outstanding energy, vision and organizing genius".

He retired from NALGO in 1943, "weary of increasing and often bitter personal conflicts with some members of the NEC and his senior staff". He prepared a report on the reorganisation of local government in Jamaica, and took up a post as head of the department of public and social administration at University College, Exeter. He also ran a course on local government for Commonwealth students in Oxford, where he died in 1961, aged 78.

Trade union offices
Preceded by Frank Ginn (Honorary Secretary)	General Secretary of the National Association of Local Government Officers; 1909–1943	Succeeded by John Simonds
