= National Pensioners Convention =

- Formation: 1 June 1979; 47 years ago
- Founder: Jack Jones
- Headquarters: London
- Location: United Kingdom
- Members: (2018)
- National organisers: Bev Morrison Jonathan Safir Mohammad Jameer
- President: Rosie MacGregor
- General Secretary: Jan Shortt
- Deputy General Secretary: Linda Richards
- Website: npcuk.org

The National Pensioners Convention (NPC) is the principal organisation representing pensioners in the United Kingdom. It is made up of around hundreds of bodies representing 1.15 million members, organised into federal regional units.

The NPC was founded by former Transport and General Workers' Union trade union leader, Jack Jones in 1979. He served as its President until 2001, when he was succeeded by Rodney Bickerstaffe, who had been general secretary of UNISON. Frank Cooper was the next President, followed by Ron Douglas and then Rosie MacGregor.

== Presidents ==
- 1979: Jack Jones
- 2001: Rodney Bickerstaffe
- 2005: Frank Cooper
- 2013: Ron Douglas
- 2022: Rosie MacGregor
