= Christina McAnea, Baroness McAnea =

Scottish trade union leader (born 1958)

The Right Honourable The Baroness McAnea
- McAnea in 2021

4th General Secretary of UNISON
- In office 22 January 2021 – 22 January 2026
- Preceded by: Dave Prentis
- Succeeded by: Andrea Egan

Assistant General Secretary of UNISON
- In office May 2018 – 22 January 2021

Member of the House of Lords
- Lord Temporal
- Life peerage 17 August 2026

Personal details
- Born: 1958 (age 67–68) Glasgow, Scotland
- Party: Labour
- Children: 2
- Education: University of Strathclyde

Christina Campbell McAnea, Baroness McAnea (born 1958) is a Scottish former trade union leader. She was elected general secretary of UNISON on 22 January 2021, succeeding former general secretary Dave Prentis.

She served as UNISON general secretary for 5 years before being succeeded by Andrea Egan in January 2026.

== Early life and education ==
McAnea was born in 1958 in Glasgow, Scotland, and grew up in the Drumchapel area, where she attended St. Pius School (now the location of Drumchapel High School). Her mother was a dinnerlady and her father worked as a general labourer. When McAnea was 11 her mother left her husband due to his alcoholism and she was raised by her mother as a single parent.

After leaving school at 16, she worked in the Civil Service, National Health Service and retail, before enrolling at the University of Strathclyde to study English and history.

== Career ==
=== Early career ===
After university, McAnea worked at Glasgow City Council as a housing officer, before starting to work for the GMB, where she advised workers taking cases before their employers.

=== UNISON ===
McAnea has worked at UNISON since its founding in 1993. She previously worked at the National and Local Government Officers' Association (NALGO), initially as women's officer, before its amalgamation into UNISON. She became one of five assistant general secretaries of UNISON in May 2018.

=== General Secretary of UNISON ===
McAnea was elected to succeed Dave Prentis as general secretary of UNISON on 11 January 2021, after winning 47.7% of the members' vote. Prentis had been general secretary for 20 years. McAnea took up office on 22 January 2021.

In 2023, McAnea was ranked ninth on the New Statesman' Left Power List, described by the newspaper as having an extensive influence on the left.

McAnea served as UNISON general secretary until January 2026, having lost the 2025 UNISON general secretary election to Andrea Egan.. This would be the first time in UNISON's history that only two candidates would go head-to-head for the position with McAnea receiving 40.18% of the vote to Egan's 59.82%.

=== House of Lords ===
McAnea was conferred as a life peer in the July 2026 political peerages to sit in the House of Lords as a Labour Party peer; she was created as Baroness McAnea, of Kelvingrove in the City of Glasgow on 17 August 2026.

== Personal life ==
McAnea lives in south London and was married to Robert who died in November 2024. She has two adult children. McAnea is a member of the Labour Party. In the early 1980s, she was a member of the Communist Party of Great Britain (CPGB).
