= Hector MacKenzie, Baron MacKenzie of Culkein =

Scottish nurse and trade union official

The Right Honourable The Lord MacKenzie of Culkein
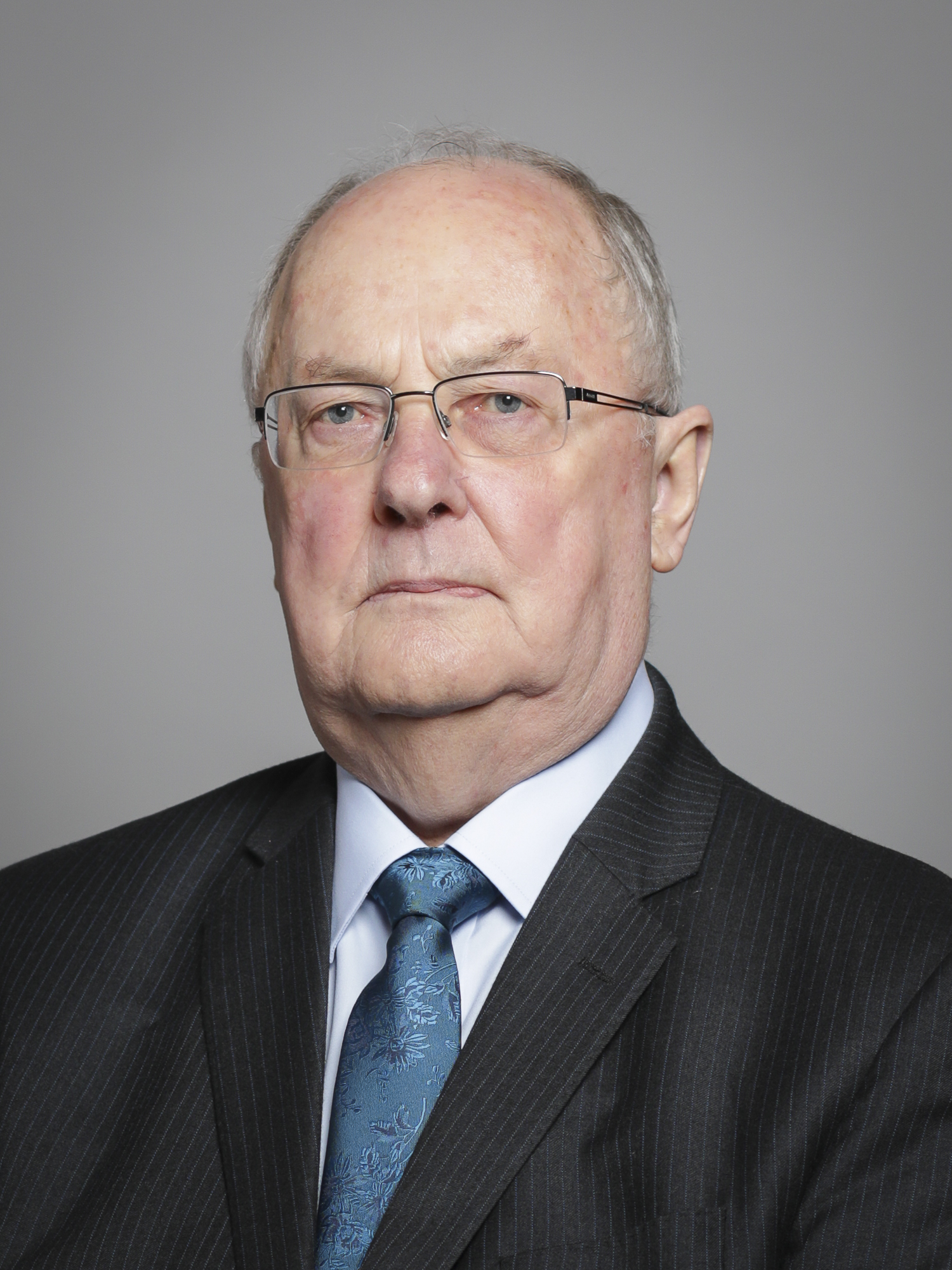
- Official portrait, 2020

Member of the House of Lords
- Lord Temporal
- Life peerage 4 August 1999 – 8 July 2024

Personal details
- Born: Hector Uisdean MacKenzie; 25 February 1940 (age 86)
- Party: Labour
- Spouse: Anna Morrison (m. 1961–1991)
- Children: 4

Hector Uisdean MacKenzie, Baron MacKenzie of Culkein (born 25 February 1940) is a Scottish nurse and former trade union official.

The son of George MacKenzie and Williamina Sutherland, he was educated at the Isle of Erraid Public School in Argyll, the Aird Public School on the Isle of Lewis, the Nicolson Institute in Stornoway, and the Portree High School in Skye. He went then to the Leverndale School of Nursing in Glasgow and the West Cumberland School of Nursing in Whitehaven.

MacKenzie was a student nurse at the Leverndale Hospital from 1958 to 1961 and West Cumberland Hospital from 1964 to 1966. Since 1969, he had worked for the Confederation of Health Service Employees, first as assistant regional secretary, then from 1970 to 1974 as regional secretary for Yorkshire and East Midlands. He was the national officer from 1974 to 1983, assistant general secretary from 1983 to 1987, and general secretary from 1987 to 1993.

MacKenzie is a member of UNISON and was its associate general secretary between 1993 and 2000.

In 1966 he received the Lindsay Robertson Gold Medal for Nurse of the Year, and in 1999 he was created a life peer as Baron MacKenzie of Culkein, of Assynt in Highland.

MacKenzie of Culkein was married to Anna Morrison from 1961 to 1991; they have one son and three daughters.

Mackenzie retired from the House of Lords on 8 July 2004. He retains his peerage and title.

Trade union offices
| Preceded by David Williams | Assistant General Secretary of the Confederation of Health Service Employees; 1983–1987 | Succeeded by Colm O'Kane |
| Preceded by David Williams | General Secretary of the Confederation of Health Service Employees; 1987–1993 | Position abolished |
| Preceded by John Edmonds | President of the Trades Union Congress; 1999 | Succeeded by Rita Donaghy |
Orders of precedence in the United Kingdom
| Preceded by The Lord Woolmer of Leeds | Gentlemen; Baron MacKenzie of Culkein | Followed by The Lord Robertson of Port Ellen |
