= Alan Jinkinson =

British trade union leader (1935–2022)

Alan Raymond Jinkinson
- Born: 1935; Sheffield, Yorkshire
- Died: 2022 (aged 86–87)
- Occupation: trade union leader

Alan Raymond Jinkinson (27 February 1935 – 6 November 2022) was a British trade union leader.

Jinkinson was born in Sheffield, Yorkshire on 27 February 1935, and was educated at King Edward VII School in the city. After national service in the Royal Signals, he took a place at Keble College, Oxford, gaining a degree in history, and then became, first, an accountant, and then a teacher, before joining the public service trade union NALGO (National and Local Government Officers' Association) in its education department in 1960.

Jinkinson stood for the Labour Party in the 1962 Orpington by-election. A supporter of Hugh Gaitskell, he attacked Eric Lubbock, the Liberal Party candidate for supporting unilateral nuclear disarmament. However, Lubbock won the seat, while Jinkinson took third place with 12.4% of the vote, losing his deposit. Jinkinson also stood for Labour at Hendon North in the 1964 general election, losing but reducing the Conservative majority.

He became deputy general secretary of NALGO in 1981, and succeeded John Daly as general secretary in 1990, helping to oversee the union's merger with NUPE and COHSE in 1993 to form Unison. He remained general secretary of Unison before retiring in 1996.

Jinkinson died on 6 November 2022, at the age of 87.

Trade union offices
Preceded by John Daly	Deputy General Secretary of NALGO; 1983–1990	Succeeded by Dave Prentis
Preceded by John Daly	General Secretary of NALGO; 1990–1993	Succeeded by Position abolished
Preceded by new position	General Secretary of UNISON; 1993–1996	Succeeded by Rodney Bickerstaffe
