= Britannia Building Society =

Former building society

- Company type: Building Society (Mutual)
- Industry: Financial services
- Founded: 1856; 170 years ago
- Defunct: 1 August 2009; 16 years ago (merged into The Co-operative Banking Group)
- Fate: Dissolution
- Headquarters: Leek, Staffordshire, United Kingdom
- Number of locations: 254 (2008)
- Key people: Neville Richardson, final Chief Executive
- Products: Savings and Mortgages
- Net income: £49.3 million (December 2007)
- Total assets: £36.8 billion (31 December 2007)
- Number of employees: 5,000 (2008)
- Parent: The Co-operative Bank
- Website: www.britannia.co.uk

The Britannia Building Society was founded as the Leek & Moorlands Building Society in Leek in 1856. It expanded steadily as a regional society until the late 1950s when it began a major expansion drive, partly through branch openings but also some 55 acquisitions. The most substantial of these were the NALGO Building Society in 1960; the Westbourne Park Building Society in 1965 (becoming the Leek and Westbourne Building Society); and the Eastern Counties Building Society in 1974 (becoming the Leek, Westbourne and Eastern Counties Building Society). The society's name was changed to the Britannia Building Society the following year.

Following the acquisition of the Bristol & West in 2005, the Britannia became the second-largest building society in the UK (based on total assets of £36.8 billion) at 31 December 2007.

It merged with The Co-operative Banking Group in 2009, and was legally dissolved as a separate organisation on 1 August that year; it has remained as a trading name of The Co-operative Bank ever since. In January 2013, the Co-operative announced that the brand would be phased out by the end of 2013, and began rebranding branches under its own name. However, the Co-operative Bank's own financial crisis resulted in the original plans being abandoned. Many Britannia branches were instead closed, and only a small number were retained and rebranded.

== History ==
=== Early history and the Shaw era ===
The Leek & Moorlands Permanent Benefit Building Society was founded in the small Staffordshire town of Leek in 1856. There were already two terminating societies in the town, one of which was the Leek Benefit Building Society. The Leek Benefit’s solicitors saw the opportunity for a permanent organization and formed the Leek & Moorlands. The solicitor’s managing clerk, Thomas Shaw, was installed as Secretary, later managing director, and he ran the society until his death in 1913. Under Shaw, the society slowly expanded into the neighbouring areas of Derbyshire and the Potteries in the 1860s and 70s. One of the early features of the Society was that it was free to lend on commercial and agricultural property. In 1879 the society registered under the Building Societies Act 1874, taking the opportunity to shorten its name to the Leek & Moorlands. By this time the society had around 1,750 members; this was to increase to 4,600 (now shareholders) by the end of Thomas Shaw’s long tenure. After his death, Thomas’s son Arthur took over the running of the society until his death in 1929, by which time shareholder numbers were approaching 15,000. The Shaw family had controlled the society for 73 years.

=== 1930s and Hubert Newton ===
Four years after the death of Arthur Shaw, the directors decided to look outside the Society for fresh leadership. In 1933, the 29-year-old [Sir] Hubert Newton was recruited as Secretary; he became a director in 1938 and under various titles, ran the society until he retired as Chairman in 1985, a span of 52 years. Like Sir Harold Bellman of the Abbey National and Sir Enoch Hill of the Halifax Building Society, Newton was one of the commanding figures in the building society industry. Described in the official history as “a maverick”, he had only been at the Leek for three years when he challenged the Building Societies Association over proposed rule changes and led a breakaway union, the National Federation of Building Societies (to merge back in 1940. Newton’s involvement with the association (he was later chairman of the BSA) gave him a range of contacts which facilitated the Leek's post-war acquisitions. However, with the exception of one small acquisition in 1938, expansion in the 1930s was still organic. Redden’s history recorded that in 1935 less than 2,000 out of 30,000 members were local and branches had been opened as far afield as Manchester, Liverpool and Bristol.

=== The merger era ===
Led by Hubert Newton, the Leek & Moorlands embarked on a sustained strategy of both branch openings and the acquisition of smaller building societies. Between 1956 and 1983 there were 55 separate “amalgamations” of varying sizes. Some of these were very small. For instance, in 1967 and 1968, the Leek bought two London societies: the Acme with assets of only £62,000 and the Greater London Permanent with £30,000 assets – barely enough to mortgage a couple of four bedroom detached houses. The first large acquisition came in 1960 with the NALGO Building Society; .it added £13m assets to Leek's £33m making Leek now number eight in the industry. In 1965 Leek merged with the Westbourne Park Building Society. Based in the Paddington area of London the Westbourne had been founded in 1885 by members of the Westbourne Park Baptist Church. With assets of £53m it was the 17th largest in the industry and it propelled the Leek up to number six. In the spirit of the merger, the Moorlands name went and the society became the Leek & Westbourne. There were joint head offices and joint managing directors. The next large acquisition was in 1974, the purchase of the substantial Eastern Counties Building Society. Recognizing the Eastern’s regional importance, the society changed its name to the unwieldy Leek Westbourne and Eastern Counties Building Society. However, within months the acquisition of the small Oldbury Britannia Building Society was the cue for a name change to the Britannia Building Society, effected in 1975.

=== The Britannia ===
One year after the renaming of the Britannia, the number of individual shareholders was 550,000 compared with only 23,000 after the War. Albeit helped by substantial inflation, the value of total assets was £781m compared with only £11m in 1946. Of course, it was not the only society growing by acquisition and the Britannia was still ranked around number seven in the industry. The growth continued unabated and by1982 the number of members exceeded one million. In that year alone there were four acquisitions and 18 branches were opened, taking the total to 221. By then, however, the old guard was about to depart. The long serving managing director stood down in 1984 and Sir Hubert Newton retired as chairman in 1985. After that, there were only two more small acquisitions – the Blackheath in 1986 and the Mornington in 1991.

=== Bristol & West ===
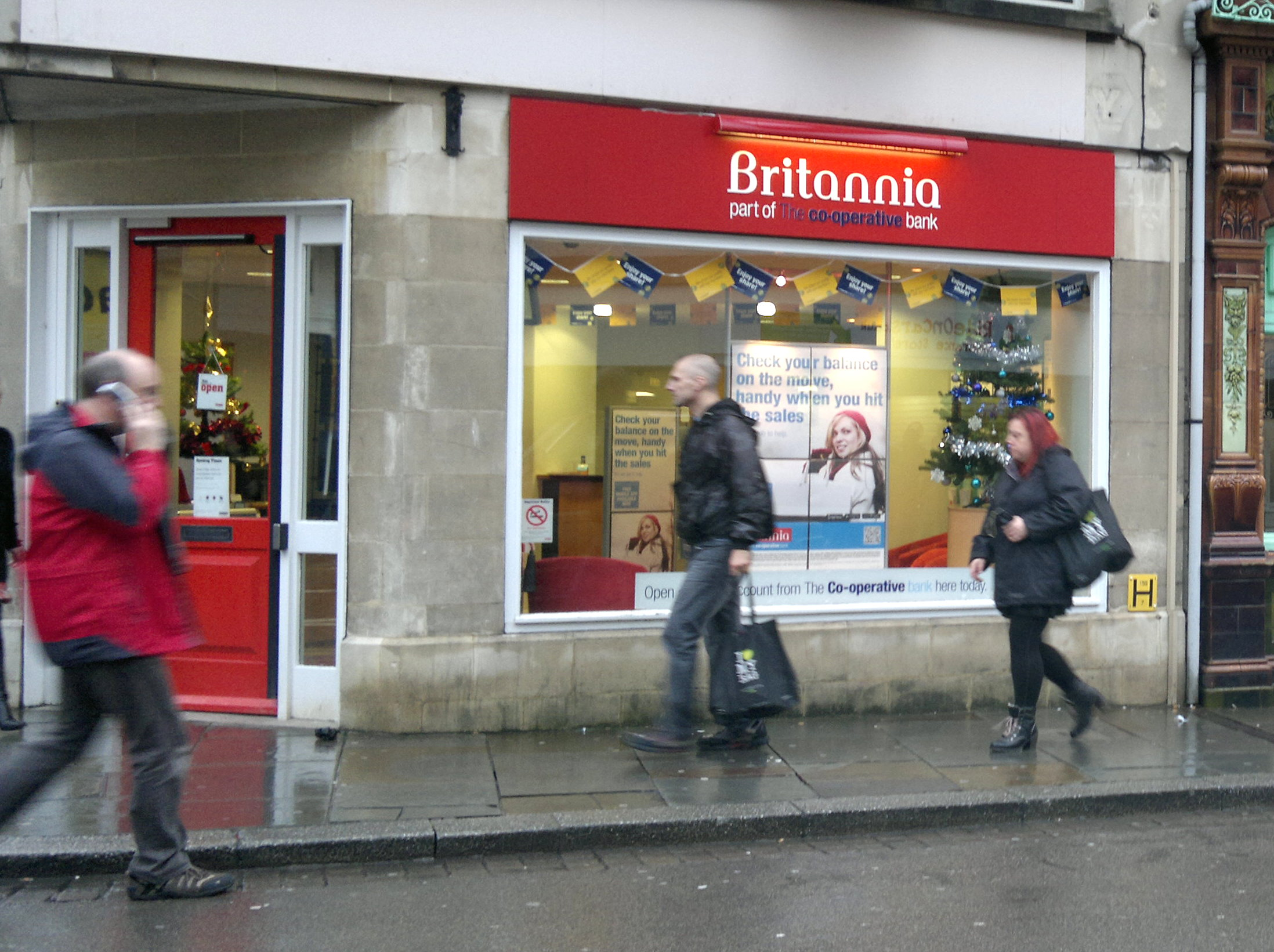
A branch of the Britannia in Gloucester displaying Co-operative branding.

The last acquisition was the deposit base and branch network of former building society Bristol & West (bringing with it approximately 700,000 customers) from Bank of Ireland in May 2005. This was the first major re-mutualisation in the United Kingdom (following the earlier demutualisation trend) and brought membership of the enlarged society to just under three million. Bank of Ireland retained ownership of the Bristol & West brand and all other parts of the business.

=== Co-operative Group ===
On 21 January 2009, Co-operative Financial Services (later The Co-operative Banking Group) and Britannia Building Society proposed a merger, first mooted in October 2008. On 29 April 2009, Britannia members voted overwhelmingly to become part of Co-operative Financial Services, the first such merger between different types of mutual under the Butterfill Act. CFS, which incorporated the Co-operative Bank and Co-operative Insurance Society, was itself a subsidiary of the Co-operative Group. On 1 August 2009, Britannia Building Society was legally dissolved and Neville Richardson, its last chief executive, became chief executive of the enlarged CFS.

Coincidentally, the largest remaining building society, Nationwide, a competitor with Britannia, was itself formed in 1884 as the Co-operative Permanent Building Society to provide services to members of the co-operative movement.

In 2023, The Co-operative Bank began moving Britannia customers over to The Co-operative Bank platform, creating new accounts for them and closing their old accounts. This enabled the bank to turn off the Britannia legacy systems. At the same time, The Co-operative Bank stopped offering new Britannia accounts. By 2024, all Britannia accounts had been closed and customers moved to new Co-operative Bank accounts – thereby ending the Britannia brand after 49 years.

== Subsidiaries ==
Earlier logo used until 1995

The Britannia group of companies included the following principal subsidiary undertakings:

- Britannia International Limited
- Britannia Treasury Services Ltd.
- Britsafe Insurance Services (Guernsey) Ltd.
- Platform Home Loans Ltd., subprime mortgage loans for the use of UK intermediaries (mortgage brokers) only
- Western Mortgage Services Ltd.

A former member of the Building Societies Association and the Council of Mortgage Lenders, Britannia also subscribed to the Financial Ombudsman Service.

== Membership ==
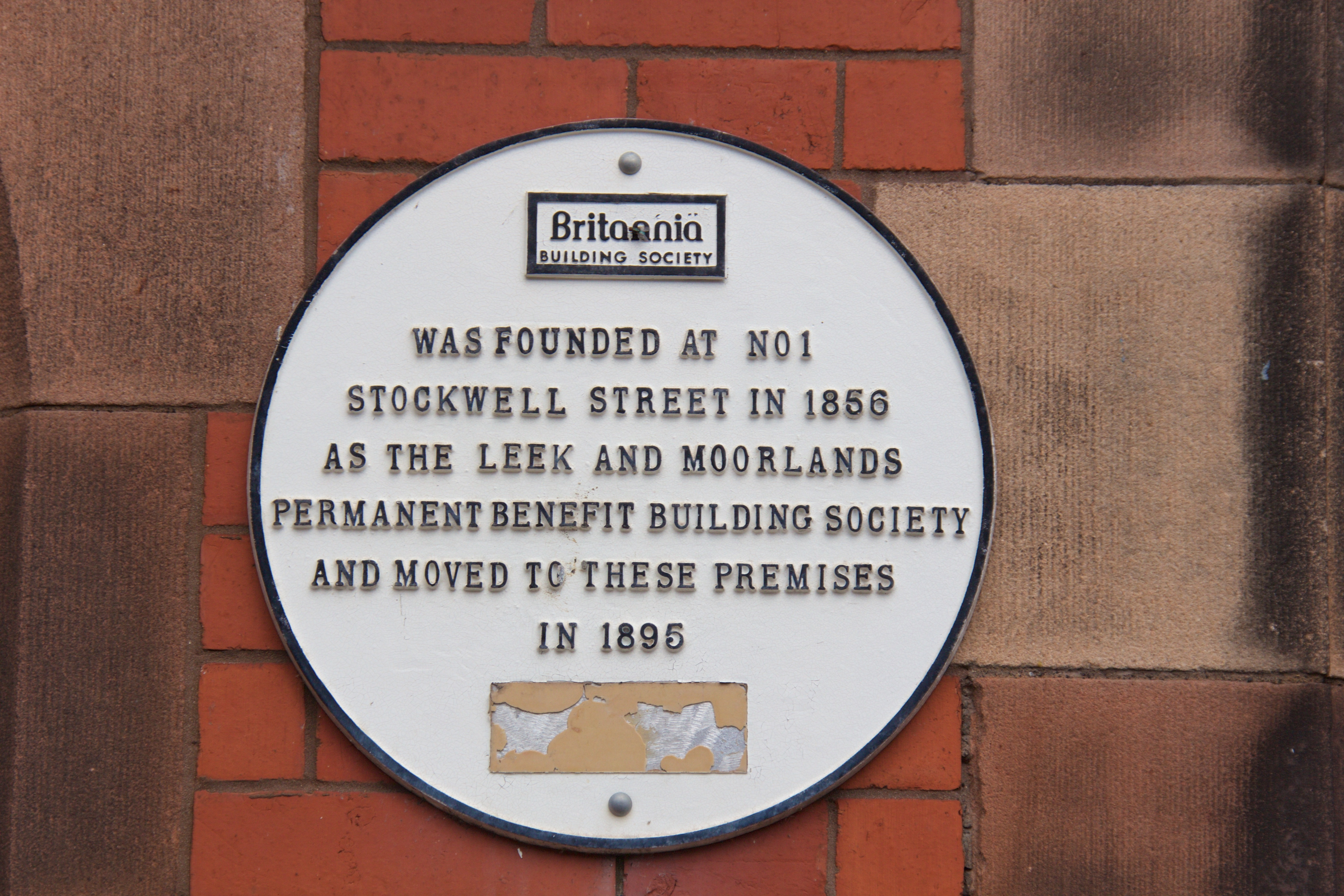
Plaque for the founding of the Society, in Leek

In 1999, Britannia was one of seven building societies unsuccessfully targeted by the carpetbagger Michael Hardern. To fight this threat to its mutual status, in 1998, the society announced that new members would in future be required to assign any future windfall payments to the Britannia Building Society Foundation, a charity set up for this purpose.

== Affiliations ==
Britannia was official sponsor of Stoke City F.C., which played in the Premier League between 2008 and 2018, and lent its name to the club's stadium. It also sponsored Ipswich Town F.C.'s west stand at Portman Road, the Britannia Stand, which was renamed the East of England Co-operative Stand in 2012.

Britannia also maintained trade union affinity partnerships with UNISON—the Public Service Union (successor to NALGO), the Union of Shop, Distributive and Allied Workers (USDAW), the Association of Teachers and Lecturers (ATL) and Unity (formerly CATU).

== See also ==
- Britannia Staff Union
- Foden's Band
- UIA Mutual
