= Mental Hospital =

Mental hospital may refer to:

- Psychiatric hospital
- Mental Hospital and Institutional Workers' Union, a former trade union in the United Kingdom
