= Dave Prentis =

British trade unionist

The Right Honourable The Lord Prentis of Leeds
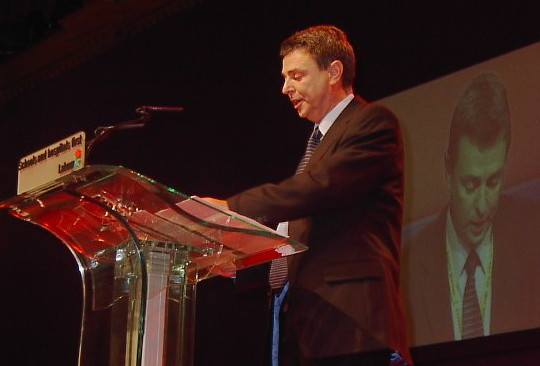
- Prentis speaking at the Labour Party Conference in 2002

3rd General Secretary of UNISON
- In office 1 January 2001 – 22 January 2021
- Preceded by: Rodney Bickerstaffe
- Succeeded by: Christina McAnea

Member of the House of Lords
- Lord Temporal
- Life peerage 18 November 2022

Personal details
- Born: 29 May 1948 (age 78) Leeds, England
- Party: Labour
- Domestic partner: Liz Snape
- Education: University of London; London School of Economics; University of Warwick

David Prentis, Baron Prentis of Leeds (born 29 May 1948) is a British trade unionist and former General Secretary of UNISON, the United Kingdom's largest trade union. He was originally elected in 2000. He was re-elected in March 2005 with 77% of the vote, in 2010 with 67% of the vote, and in 2015 with 49% of the vote.

== Early life ==
Prentis was born and brought up in Leeds where he attended St Michael's College from 1959 to 1967. He went to the University of London where he took a BA in History, then studied Economic History at the London School of Economics. This was followed by a master's degree in Industrial Relations at the University of Warwick.

== Trade unions ==
He joined NALGO in 1975, and in 1990 he became its deputy general secretary. He was UNISON's deputy general secretary (DGS) from its formation in July 1993, when it was formed from NALGO, NUPE and CoHSE.

=== UNISON leadership ===
In his role as the deputy general secretary, Prentis directed UNISON's national negotiating team and oversaw the union's policy making functions. He also drove through a strategic review of the union, aimed at delivering key reforms, to bring union services closer to the members. In 2001, he succeeded Rodney Bickerstaffe as General Secretary of UNISON, having been elected in February 2000.

Prentis was responsible for 1,500 staff and a turnover of around £160 million. As General Secretary, he received a total salary and benefits package worth £112,114 in the accounting year ending 31 December 2013.

He was a member of the TUC General Council, TUC executive committee and the Trade Union Labour Party Liaison Committee. He was elected President of the TUC for the year 2008.

In July 2020, he announced his decision to step down at the end of the year. Christina McAnea was elected as his successor in a ballot of members, in which she won 47.7% of the vote.

It was announced on 14 October 2022, that as part of the 2022 Special Honours, Prentis would receive a life peerage, sitting for the Labour Party. On 18 November 2022, he was created Baron Prentis of Leeds, of Harehills in the City of Leeds.

== Public appointments ==
- Trustee of the Institute for Public Policy Research (IPPR) and also Catalyst, two centre-left research bodies
- Adviser to the Warwick Institute of Governance and Public Management
- Visiting fellow of Nuffield College, Oxford
- Member of various joint working parties with the government and the CBI
- President of Unity Trust Bank
- since, 1 June 2012, non-executive director of the Bank of England. The initial appointment is until 31 May 2015. For the accounting year 2013/14 non-executive directors of the Bank of England received total remuneration of £165,458.

== Personal life ==
In 2000, he was diagnosed with cancer of the oesophagus and stomach. He had much of his stomach removed, underwent chemotherapy, and then contracted MRSA in hospital. Since his recovery from cancer he has been unable to eat large meals.

Trade union offices
| Preceded by Alan Jinkinson | Deputy General Secretary of NALGO; 1990–1993 | Position abolished |
| New post | Deputy General Secretary of UNISON; 1993–2000; With: Colm O'Kane and Tom Sawyer (1993–1994) | Succeeded by Keith Sonnet |
| Preceded by Rodney Bickerstaffe | General Secretary of UNISON; 2001–2021 | Succeeded by Christina McAnea |
| Preceded by Alison Shepherd | President of the Trades Union Congress; 2008 | Succeeded by Sheila Bearcroft |
| Preceded by Ylva Thörn | President of the Public Services International; 2010–2023 | Succeeded by Britta Lejon |
Orders of precedence in the United Kingdom
| Preceded by The Lord Hendy of Richmond Hill | Gentlemen; Baron Prentis of Leeds | Followed by The Lord Peach |
