= Cliff Comer =

British trade unionist (1896–1978)

Clifford Frank Comer (22 April 1896 – 22 September 1978) was a British trade unionist.

Born in Weston-super-Mare, Comer began working as a mental health nurse at Wells Hospital. He joined the Mental Hospital and Institutional Workers' Union (MHIWU), and was a branch secretary by the mid-1920s.

In 1932, Comer began working full-time for the union as its first national organiser, based in Manchester. He was transferred to London as Southern Organiser in 1938, replacing Stanley Morgan. The MHIWU became part of the Confederation of Health Service Employees (COHSE) in 1946, and Comer was appointed as its first assistant general secretary and Southern National Organiser. In 1948, he was elected as general secretary of the union, serving until 1953. He resigned, claiming it was for "purely personal" reasons, although Mick Carpenter claims that he was frustrated by conflicts within the union and its failure to grow as expected.

Comer was a supporter of the Labour Party, which he represented as a member of Somerset County Council.

Trade union offices
Preceded by George Gibson	General Secretary of the Confederation of Health Service Employees; 1948–1953	Succeeded by Jack Waite
