= The Co-operative Banking Group =

Bank in the UK

Co-operative Banking Group
- Type: Limited company owned by a consumer co-operative
- Industry: Financial services
- Predecessor: CIS (founded 1867)
- Founded: 2002
- Defunct: 2013
- Headquarters: CIS Tower, Manchester, United Kingdom
- Key people: Richard Pym (Chairman); Niall Booker (Chief Executive)
- Products: Banking and Insurance
- Revenue: GBP 1,116.7 million
- Parent: The Co-operative Group
- Website: www.co-operativebankinggroup.co.uk

Co-operative Banking Group Limited (originally Co-operative Financial Services) was a UK-based banking and insurance company and a wholly owned subsidiary of The Co-operative Group. Established in 2002, its head office was located at the CIS Tower, Miller Street, Manchester.

It was mainly known through its two main subsidiaries: The Co-operative Bank (incorporating Smile, the first full internet bank in the UK) and The Co-operative Insurance. Co-operative Financial Services was formed as a holding company to bring these financial subsidiaries together under one umbrella society and to enable synergies between the businesses to be exploited. Following the Co-operative Bank's financial crisis in 2013, the group sold a majority of shares in the business, retaining a 20% stake. As a result, the group was reorganised, and the banking group structure was discontinued.

== History ==
In 2007, the Group agreed to outsource its information systems to Xansa (now Sopra Steria). In 2008, Co-operative Financial Services was Business in the Community's Company of the Year, having been recognised at their Awards for Excellence gala dinner for making sustainable development a top priority in how it operates and in the products and services offered to its customers. They also won an Impact on Society Award, given to companies that are improving their business and their overall impact on society in the marketplace, the workplace, the environment and the community, through leadership and integration of its corporate responsibility practices.

On 21 January 2009, Co-operative Financial Services and Britannia Building Society proposed a merger, with the new "super-mutual" being brought under the stewardship of The Co-operative Group. On 29 April 2009 the merger, the first under the so-called Butterfill Act, was agreed by Britannia members. On 1 August 2009 Britannia Building Society was legally dissolved and Neville Richardson, its last Chief Executive, became Chief Executive of the enlarged CFS. The resultant "super-mutual" had assets of £70 billion and 9 million customers.

As of June 2011, Co-operative Financial Services was reported to be close to appointing Credit Suisse to advise it on a potential bid for the 600+ branches, and a large chunk of mortgage business, that Lloyds Banking Group was ordered to sell by the European Commission.

In July 2011, the chief executive Neville Richardson was replaced by Barry Tootell, who became acting chief executive of Co-operative Financial Services. Peter Marks, chief executive of Co-operative Financial Services' parent company The Co-operative Group cited Neville's desire to step down as the reason for the change. In September 2011, Co-operative Financial Services became the Co-operative Banking Group. In December 2011 Lloyds Banking Group announced that Co-operative Banking Group was its preferred bidder for the assets which it was selling to comply with EU competition regulations, and that the two parties would be entering into exclusive talks.

== 2013 financial crisis ==
On 24 April 2013, The Co-operative Group announced it had withdrawn from purchasing the "Verde" business of Lloyds Banking Group after boards of the group and The Co-operative Bank decided that it was not in the best interests of the group's members to proceed further at the time.

In May 2013, after the recognition of inadequate capital levels in the banking group, Euan Sutherland took over from Peter Marks as Co-operative Group chief executive. That month Moody's downgraded the bank's credit rating by six notches to junk status (Ba3) and the bank's Acting Chief Executive Barry Tootell resigned. The difficulties stem largely from the commercial loans of the Britannia Building Society, acquired in the 2009 merger. The group intended to sell its life insurance business to Royal London, releasing about £200m in capital, and was planning to dispose of its other insurance business. Further financial restructuring was required, and the option of the Bank of England taking over the ownership of the bank under the Banking Act 2009 had been considered. Former HSBC executive Niall Booker was appointed Chief Executive of The Co-operative Bank. On 5 June Richard Pennycook, former finance director of Morrisons, was named Co-operative Group's finance director, and Richard Pym, former chief executive of Alliance & Leicester, as chair of the Co-operative Banking Group and the Co-operative Bank.
