= Hospital and Welfare Services Union =

Former British trade union

The Hospital and Welfare Services Union (HWSU) was established in 1918 as the Poor Law Workers Trade Union. It recruited from all ranks in the poor law service. Within a year it claimed 10,000 members.

In 1922 changed its name to Poor Law Officers Union, in 1930 to the National Union of County Officers (NUCO), and in 1943 to the Hospital and Welfare Services Union.

It was Vincent Evans (1889–1946), a deputy clerk at the Paddington Board of Guardians, who in 1918 was responsible for convening the first meeting of Poor Law staff to consider forming a union. The first General Secretary was Archibald Milne, an Assistant General Relieving Officer at Willsden Board of Guardians, but he was soon replaced by Vincent Evans.

== Guilds ==
The union developed a unique and successful sectional or "guild" system of union organisation, the most successful of which was the NUCO's Guild of Nurses, set up in October 1937. However, the union also had "guilds" for medical staff, ambulance staff and ancillary staff. The guild system continued into the early days of COHSE.

NUCO Guild of Nurses was led by nurses such as Iris Brook (Guild of Nursing organiser from 1937), Doris Westmacott, and Deptford Councillor Beatrice Drapper. It organised a Masked Nurses protest on 26 November 1937, where nurses in white uniform with white masks marched through London and were prevented by the police from entering the City of London. 500 attended a meeting at St Pancras Town Hall addressed by George Lansbury demanding a 96-hour fortnight.

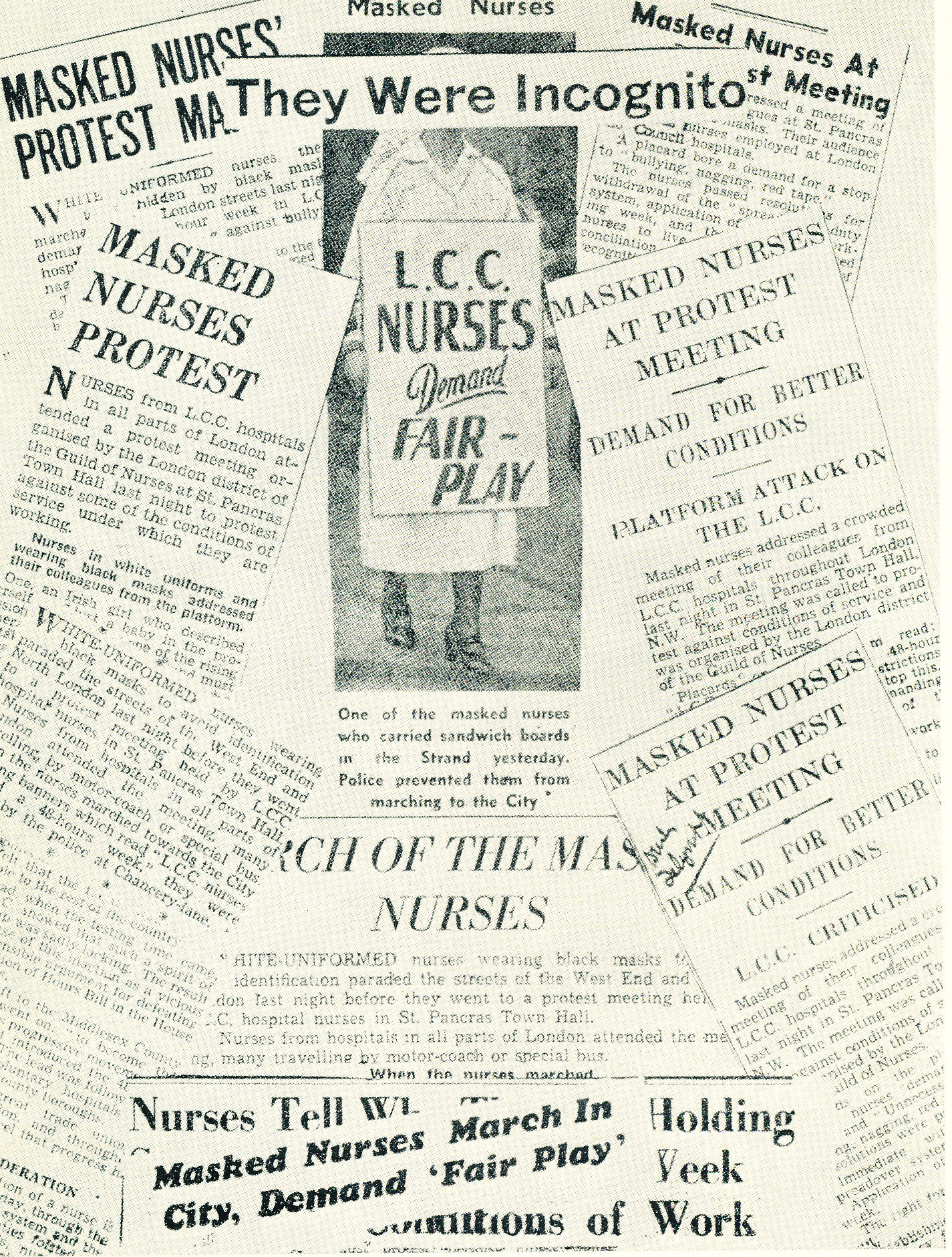
Press cuttings of the NUCO Guild of Nurses demonstration 1937

In 1946 it amalgamated with the Mental Hospital and Institutional Workers Union to form COHSE, the Confederation of Health Service Employees and in 1993 COHSE amalgamated with NUPE and NALGO to form UNISON.
