= George Gibson (trade unionist) =

British mental hospital attendant and trade unionist (1885–1953)

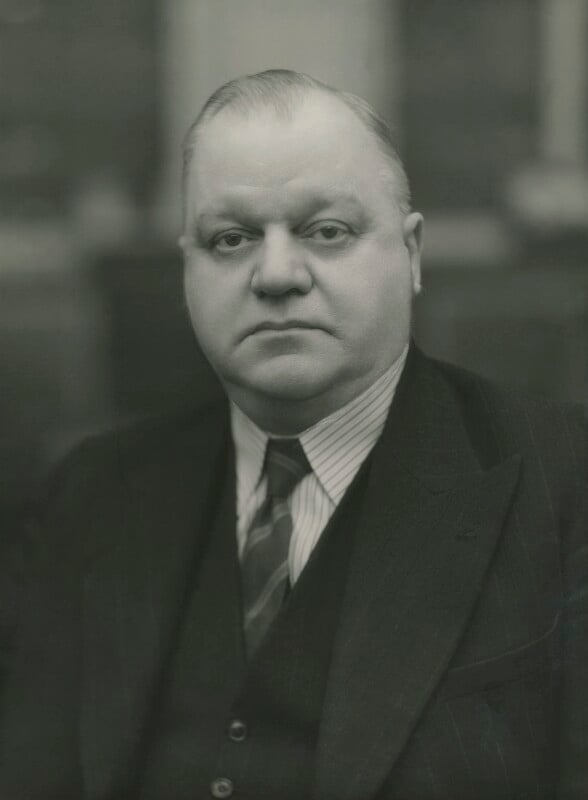
Gibson in 1940

George Gibson CH (3 April 1885 – 4 February 1953) was a British mental hospital attendant, trade unionist and public servant who was General Secretary of the National Asylum Workers' Union, later renamed the Mental Hospital and Institutional Workers' Union, from 1913 to 1947, then of the Confederation of Health Service Employees, into which the previous union merged, from 1947 to 1948. He was ruined through his largely innocent association with the fraudster Sidney Stanley, which was exposed by the Lynskey Tribunal in 1948.

Gibson was born in Calton, a suburb of Glasgow, the son of Irish-born Johnston Gibson, a drysalter (maker of vinegar and castor oil) who later successively owned a fish and chip shop, a fish shop and a newsagent. Gibson's mother, Mary, was Scottish. Although he was a good scholar, Gibson left school at the age of eleven and held a variety of jobs before moving to England in 1910 to become an attendant at Winwick Asylum in Warrington.

On 10 July 1910 he became one of the co-founders of the National Asylum Workers' Union and was elected its first Secretary. He became vice-president in 1911 and Assistant Organising Secretary in 1912. In 1913 he became full-time General Secretary. The union was renamed the Mental Hospital and Institutional Workers' Union in 1930 and amalgamated with others to form the Confederation of Health Service Employees (COHSE) in 1947. Gibson remained General Secretary throughout these changes, but resigned in 1948. He represented the Trades Union Congress on the Nurses Salaries Committee chaired by Lord Rushcliffe which published two reports in 1943. He was elected to the General Council of the Trades Union Congress in 1928 and remained a member until his retirement in 1948. He chaired the General Council and was President of the TUC from 1940 to 1941.

Gibson enlisted in the Royal Garrison Artillery in 1915 and was commissioned in 1917. He was demobbed in 1919 as a substantive Lieutenant, but as he was commanding a battery he was probably acting in a higher rank. He had been twice mentioned in despatches, and was gassed, which left him a semi-asthmatic for the rest of his life.

From 1940 to 1941 Gibson served as a full-time Director of the Children's Overseas Reception Board, responsible for evacuating British children overseas. In 1941 he visited both Sweden and the United States on official missions. He also served in many other positions during and after the war, including as vice-chairman of the National Savings Committee (1939–1949), a director of the Bank of England (1946–1949), Chairman of the North West Regional Board for Industry, Chairman of the North Western Electricity Board and Chairman of the BBC General Council. In 1946 he was appointed Member of the Order of the Companions of Honour (CH).

In 1949 the Lynskey Tribunal found that Gibson had used his official influence to assist Sidney Stanley to set up a business in expectation of personal gain. The subsequent scandal compelled Gibson to resign from all official posts, although he continued to deny all the allegations.

At some time before the First World War Gibson married Ellen Crossfield, the daughter of a Manchester hotelier, but she was killed in a tram accident in Blackpool. He later married Eva Crabtree, whose first husband had been killed in action in 1917. He had one daughter with Ellen and a further five children with Eva.

== Sources ==
- Roodhouse, M. (2005) "Gibson, George (1885–1953)", Oxford Dictionary of National Biography, Oxford University Press, retrieved 21 July 2007 (subscription required)
- Carpenter, M. (1988) "Working for Health, The History of COHSE", Lawrence & Wishart 1988

Trade union offices
| New post | General Secretary of the National Asylum Workers' Union; 1913–1930 | Succeeded by Self; Mental Hospital and Institutional Workers' Union |
| New post | General Secretary of the Mental Hospital and Institutional Workers' Union; 1930–1946 | Position abolished |
| Preceded by Andrew Conley and Andrew Naesmith | Trades Union Congress representative to the American Federation of Labour; 1936; With: William Kean | Succeeded by John C. Little and William R. Townley |
| New post | General Secretary of the Confederation of Health Service Employees; 1946–1948 | Succeeded by Cliff Comer |
| Preceded by William Holmes | President of the Trades Union Congress; 1940–1941 | Succeeded by Frank Wolstencroft |
