= Jack Jones (trade unionist) =

British trade union leader (1913–2009)

Jack Jones CH MBE
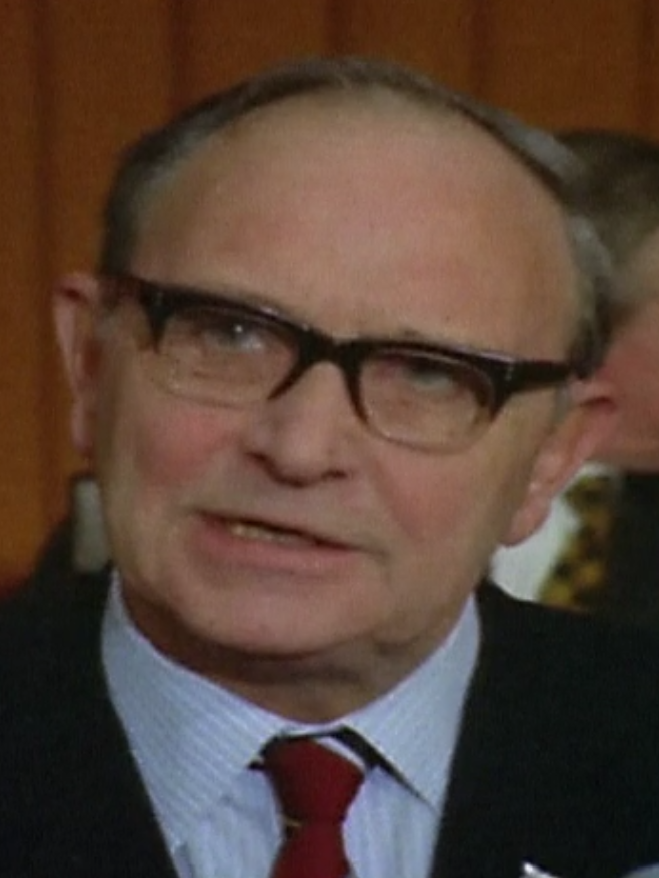
- Jones in 1973
- Born: James Larkin Jones; 29 March 1913; Garston, Liverpool, Lancashire, England
- Died: 21 April 2009 (aged 96); Peckham, London, England
- Occupation: Union leader
- Known for: former general secretary, Transport and General Workers' Union
- Military service
- Allegiance: Spanish Republic
- Branch: International Brigades
- Unit: The British Battalion of the XV International Brigade
- Conflicts: Spanish Civil War

James Larkin Jones (29 March 1913 – 21 April 2009), known as Jack Jones, was a British trade union leader and General Secretary of the Transport and General Workers' Union 1968-1978.

== Early life ==
Jones was born in Garston, Liverpool, Lancashire. He was named after the Liverpool-born Irish trade unionist James Larkin. He left school at 14 and worked as an engineering apprentice. After the Wall Street crash, Jones lost his job, eventually finding employment with a firm of signmakers and painters. He then joined his father as a Liverpool docker.

Jack Jones was converted to socialism by reading The Ragged Trousered Philanthropists by Robert Tressell, and he later explained how the book "was passed from hand to hand among people in the Labour movement and had a remarkable effect on our thinking". He became a member of the Transport and General Workers Union, and was elected shop steward, then a delegate on the National Docks Group Committee.

== Spanish Civil War ==
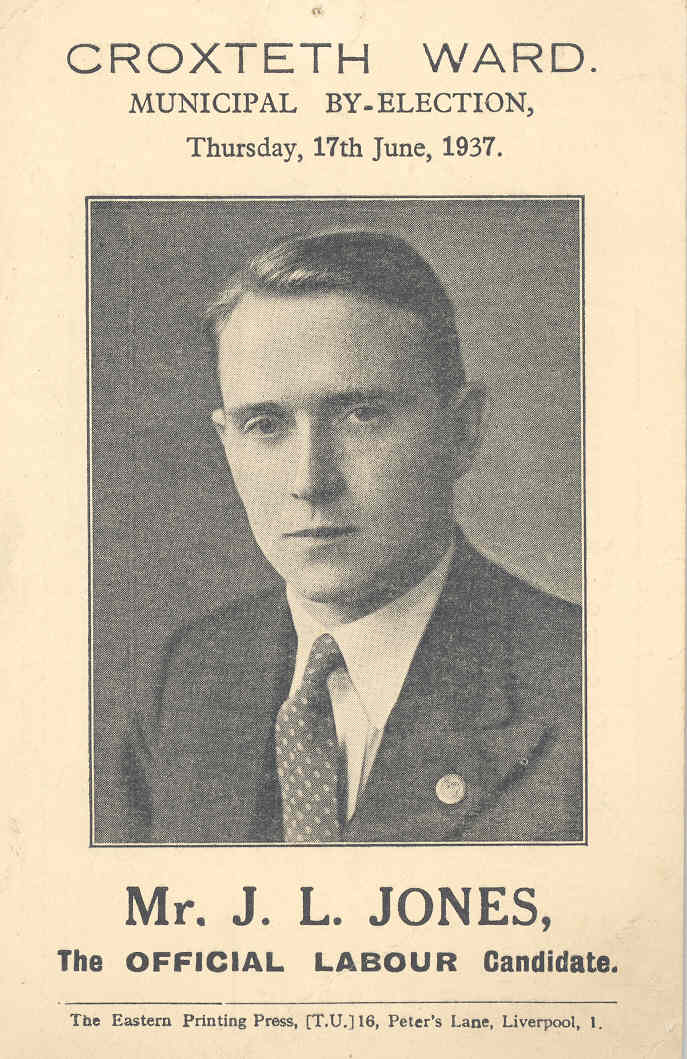
Jones was elected to the Liverpool City Council for Croxteth Ward in 1937, becoming the youngest member of the council.

Strongly opposed to the British Union of Fascists and their leader Oswald Mosley, Jones organised protest-meetings against the fascists in Liverpool, and was beaten by a group of Blackshirts armed with knuckle-dusters. A member of the Territorial Army since 1934 (he was promoted to bombardier in the Royal Artillery), in 1936 at the start of the Spanish Civil War, Jones joined and served with the British Battalion of the XV International Brigade as the political commissar of the Major Attlee Company, and was seriously wounded at the Battle of the Ebro in 1938. Prior to the battle, Jones met a delegation of students, including future Prime Minister Edward Heath, who were sympathetic to the republican cause.

== Second World War ==
On his return to Britain, Jones became a full-time official of the TGWU in Coventry. Jones played a key role in organising the workforce of the West Midlands motor industry in the postwar period as Regional Secretary of the TGWU. He was a strong supporter of the shop steward movement aimed at promoting trade union and industrial democracy. He was an early supporter of the Institute for Workers' Control. While Assistant General Secretary of the union and a member of the National Executive Committee of the Labour Party, he chaired the Labour Party policy group on Industrial Democracy.

== General Secretary of the Union ==
Jones was elected General Secretary of the TGWU in 1968. Together with Hugh Scanlon, President of the Amalgamated Engineering Union he led the left-wing trade union opposition (associated with Broad Left) to the 1966–70 Labour Government's prices and incomes policy, and the efforts of that government to introduce legislation that would have enforced a 28-day cooling off period before strike action could be taken.

In 1969 Home Secretary James Callaghan requested action that would hinder Jones's career, which was raised in cabinet, and further discussed with Secretary of State for Employment Barbara Castle. A plan for detrimental leaks to the media was placed in the Foreign Office propaganda Information Research Department, and its head prepared a briefing paper. However information about how this was effected has not been released under the thirty-year rule under a section of the Public Records Act permitting national security exemptions.

While general secretary, he was chief economic spokesman for the Trades Union Congress and one of the authors of the Social Contract. Jones was also instrumental in the creation of the Advisory, Conciliation and Arbitration Service (Acas) in 1975, and was a member of the National Economic Development Council from 1969 to 1978. Jones campaigned for Britain to leave the EEC in the 1975 referendum.

In January 1977 a Gallup opinion poll found that 54% of people believed that Jones was the most powerful person in Britain, ahead of the Prime Minister, Callaghan, and is held responsible by some in the Labour Party for being "the union leader that created the Winter of Discontent and 18 years of Tory rule", despite the fact that he had retired from the leadership of the TGWU in 1978, the year before the Winter of Discontent.

According to KGB defector Oleg Gordievsky, Jones provided intelligence to the Soviet Union in return for money. This was denied by Jones, who described the allegations as a "slur and an outrage". It was later claimed that he had in fact been working for British intelligence, informing MI5 when Russians approached him. In the authorised history of MI5 The Defence of the Realm, the author Christopher Andrew, using Gordievsky as his source, claimed that Jones passed Labour Party documents to the Soviets for cash, with the last payments to Jones occurring in 1984. Gordievsky is also cited by the journalist Ben Macintyre as stating that the KGB paid Jones for intelligence in his 2018 book "The Spy and The Traitor".

Jones also had a special relationship with and helped promote the interests of Gibraltarian workers, as well as the British Overseas Territory itself, through the auspices of the TGWU.

== Retirement ==
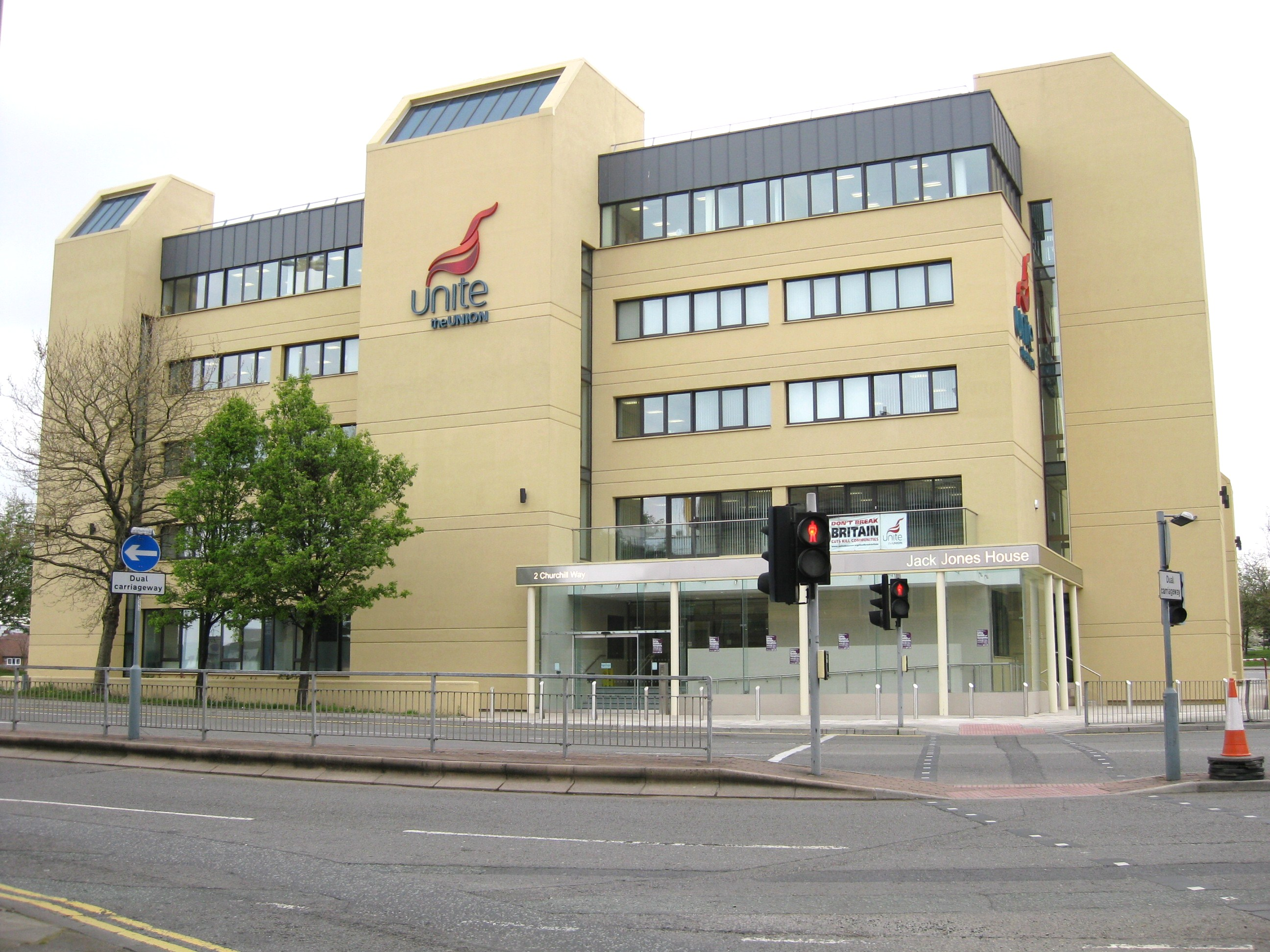
Jack Jones House, Liverpool

In retirement from the T&G, Jones served as the President of the National Pensioners Convention, an umbrella organisation representing over 1,000 local, regional and national pensioners' groups, of which he was Honorary Life President. He was also President of the International Brigade Memorial Trust. Jones's last public act was to unveil a memorial at Newhaven Fort on 7 December 2008, 70 years after British Battalion members returned to the port after the International Brigades were withdrawn from Spain.

Jones was nominated for the position of Chancellor of the University of London, but lost the election to Princess Anne in 1981. After writing his autobiography, Union Man (published in 1986), Jones became a campaigner on behalf of pensioners.

At the Labour Party conference in Bournemouth in October 2003, aged 90, he received a special award in recognition of his service to the trade union movement.

The TGWU building Transport House in Liverpool was refurbished by Unite (the trade union formed from the merger of the TGWU and Amicus) and renamed Jack Jones House in 2009.

His name also lives on in a block of sheltered flats for the elderly built by Southwark Council on Reedham Street in Peckham.

== Death ==
Jones lived in South London until his death, and died in a care home in Peckham on 21 April 2009. He was survived by his two sons. His wife of more than 50 years, Evelyn (née Taylor) had died three years earlier. She had first been married to the communist trade union organiser and close friend of Jones, George Brown, who had been killed in the Battle of Brunete in 1937 during the Spanish Civil War.

== Sources ==
- Jones, Jack (1986). Union Man. London: HarperCollins ISBN 0-00-217172-4

Trade union offices
| Preceded by Frank Cousins | General Secretary of the Transport and General Workers Union; 1968–1976 | Succeeded by Moss Evans |
Political offices
| Preceded by New position | President of the National Pensioners Convention; 1979–2001 | Succeeded by Rodney Bickerstaffe |
