= Andrea Egan =

British trade unionist

General Secretary of UNISON
- Incumbent
- Assumed office 22 January 2026
- Preceded by: Christina McAnea

Personal details
- Occupation: Trade unionist

Andrea Egan is a British social worker and trade unionist. She has been general secretary of Unison, Britain's largest trade union, since January 2026.

== Early life ==
As a child Egan lived a few years in Germany where her father served in the British Armed Forces. Her parents separated in the early 1970s, following which she, her brother and mother moved back to the UK. They lived at her grandparents' house before moving into a council house on a crime-ridden housing estate in Bolton.

== Career ==
Egan had wanted to be a police officer but, as she was too young to join, she chose a career in social work and enrolled at a local college on a bursary from the local council. The course included work placements and at the age on 19 she started working at a care home. Later, in her 20s, she transferred to the children's residential care sector and rose up the ranks to became a manager at a children's residential care unit. Egan then started working as an unqualified social worker before Bolton Council paid for her to receive training. After qualifying, she became a registered social worker.

=== Trade unionism ===
Egan became a trade union shop steward in the 1980s, aged 22, whilst working in the children's residential care sector. Later, she became a trade union convenor at the council's children's services department and secretary of Unison's local government branch in Bolton. She served as vice-president of Unison before being elected president in June 2022. Egan joined the Labour Party around 2010 but was expelled in November 2022 for sharing two articles by the Marxist Socialist Appeal after it had been proscribed amongst a range of organisations by the Labour NEC. The first article had been shared on 16 July 2021 and the second on 13 August 2021. Socialist Appeal was banned by the Labour NEC on 20 July 2021.

Egan was elected general secretary of Unison in December 2025, defeating incumbent Christina McAnea. Egan secured 60% of the votes but only 7% of Unison members took part in the ballot which is in line with a 9.8% turnout for the previous General Secretary election in 2020. She started her five-year term on 22 January 2026.

Trade union offices
Preceded by Paul Holmes	President of Unison; 2022–2023	Succeeded by Libby Nolan
Preceded by Christina McAnea	General Secretary of Unison; 2026–present	Succeeded by Incumbent
