= UIA Mutual =

British mutual insurance company (1890–2022)

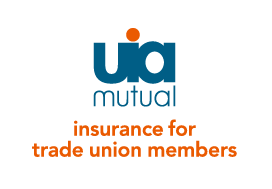
- Type: Mutual society
- Industry: Financial services
- Founded: 1890
- Defunct: 2022
- Fate: Wound down after increasing regulatory costs and pension fund losses
- Successor: Uinsure took over policies
- Headquarters: Kings Court, London Road, Stevenage, Hertfordshire, United Kingdom
- Key people: Peter Dodd (Chairperson), Jon Goodchild (Chief Executive)
- Products: General insurance
- Website: www.uia.co.uk

UIA Mutual was a mutual insurance company in the United Kingdom, providing general insurance products to members of the trade union movement and other not-for-profit organisations. It was a member of the Association of British Insurers, authorised by the Prudential Regulation Authority and regulated by the Financial Conduct Authority. (Note: Registered society under the Co-operative and Community Benefit Societies Act 2014, No. 2898R. Firm Reference No. 110863) UIA (Insurance Services) Limited was a wholly owned subsidiary, authorised and regulated by the Financial Conduct Authority. (Note: Registered in England and Wales under the Companies Act 1985, No. 2998952. Firm Reference No. 307925)

Prior to its closure, it was headquartered in Stevenage and as of 2020, had 96,210 members, 159 employees and assets of £60 million.

In 2022, UIA Mutual ceased writing new business and renewals, which are now offered under the UIA brand by Manchester-based broker Uinsure Limited.

== Origins ==
The Poor Law (and Local Government) Officers' Mutual Guarantee Association was founded by the National Poor Law Officers' Association in 1890 and registered under the Industrial and Provident Societies Act 1876. The National Association of Local Government Officers' Provident Society transferred engagements to the Poor Law and Local Government Officers' Mutual Guarantee Association, which became the National and Local Government Officers' Association Mutual Insurance Association (Logomia) in 1926. This was shortened to NALGO Insurance Association (NIA) in 1969.

The UIA name was adopted in 1993, on the merger of the National and Local Government Officers' Association (NALGO) with the National Union of Public Employees (NUPE) and Confederation of Health Service Employees (COHSE) to form UNISON (the name UNISON had previously been registered by another provider of insurance and financial services).

To help make its long standing relationship with the trades union movement clear, UIA registered Union Insurance Association as a trading name in 2015 and, to emphasise the mutual, customer-focused nature of the business, it rebranded as UIA Mutual in 2016. The Together Mutual Insurance brand was launched in 2013, to offer products to like-minded members of the general public, largely through digital routes.

== Operations ==
The Introducer Appointed Representatives permitted to assist in insurance contract arrangements with UIA Mutual included UNISON — the Public Service Union and affinity partners, Unite the Union, the Communication Workers' Union (CWU), National Association of Schoolmasters Union of Women Teachers (NASUWT), Union of Shop, Distributive and Allied Workers (USDAW), Bakers, Food and Allied Workers Union (BFAWU), National Association of Probation Officers (NAPO), Fire Brigades Union (FBU), National Union of Rail, Maritime and Transport Workers (RMT) and the Ramblers' Association charity. CWU Insurance, Unite Insurance and Usdaw Insurance were trading names of UIA (Insurance) and UIA (Insurance Services).

UIA (Insurance Services) was an insurance broker, incorporated in 1994. Travel, pet and motor insurance were provided by third parties, mainly to clients of its parent society. UIA motor insurance was arranged and administered by Autonet Insurance Services. UIA travel insurance was arranged and administered by AllClear Insurance Services. Pet insurance was provided in association with Petwise, which is a trading name of Ultimate Insurance Solutions.

In 2004, UIA announced its decision to close its £30m life assurance fund to new customers due to adverse market conditions. In 2005, its long-term business was acquired by Liverpool Victoria Friendly Society.

A survey of 1,000 UK adults, commissioned by UIA in 2015, revealed that 60% of burglary victims never feel secure in their homes again. The survey also found that, after being targeted, it takes the average victim seven months to return to some level of normality in their home. Burglars avoided being caught or prosecuted in more than two thirds of the burglaries studied.

In 2017, the Financial Conduct Authority took the decision to publish data on individual insurers, revealing details of the companies with whom customers were most and least likely to make a successful claim. At the lower end of the scale, the FCA’s statistics showed that UIA members had a 20-25% chance of having their claim relating to buildings and contents rejected.

== Winding down ==
In 2022, the Society announced that it would no longer offer members renewal of their current cover or new policies. Several issues, including rising operational costs, regulatory changes and the Society’s long-standing participation in the defined benefit UNISON Staff Pension Scheme, had created losses. The pension scheme was in deficit, meaning the Society was required to contribute significant sums each year to help it meet its obligations.

Following a strategic review, which concluded that the losses could not continue if the business was to remain solvent and could not be addressed without fundamental change, the Board sold renewal rights to Uinsure and concluded an agreement with UNISON and the pension trustees to implement a flexible apportionment arrangement, which set payments into the pension scheme in a manner that ensured the Society could meet its liabilities. The renewal and apportionment arrangements allowed the Society to continue to provide a service to existing policyholders as it was wound down on a solvent basis as an independent mutual organisation over a carefully managed “run-off” period.

== See also ==
- Britannia Building Society
- insurance company
