= John Daly (trade unionist) =

British trade union leader

John Daniel Daly (27 August 1930 – February 1999) was a British trade union leader.

Born in Clerkenwell, London, Daly worked in the print industry and then studied at Ruskin College in Oxford. He joined the Workers Educational Association, and then worked for the National Union of Tailors and Garment Workers as a negotiator and as a journal editor. From 1965 he served as a Trades Union Congress (TUC) education officer. In 1968, he moved to work for the National and Local Government Officers' Association (NALGO), spending time in each of the health, gas, and local government sections. He was chosen as an assistant general secretary of the union in 1976 and progressed to deputy general secretary in 1982.

When Geoffrey Drain, general secretary of NALGO, announced his intention to retire in 1983, Daly was the strong favourite to succeed him. He only narrowly defeated John Ward of the First Division Association, the two both placing well ahead of Alan Jinkinson, Campbell Christie and Ernest Baxendale. In the same year, he was elected to the General Council of the TUC. He served on many TUC committees including its Labour Party Liaison Committee, and chaired the Public Services Committee.

Daly retired in 1989, and was succeeded by Jinkinson. He died in 1999, aged 68.

Trade union offices
| Preceded by Bill Rankin | Deputy General Secretary of NALGO; 1982–1983 | Succeeded by Alan Jinkinson |
| Preceded by Geoffrey Drain | General Secretary of NALGO; 1983–1989 | Succeeded by Alan Jinkinson |
