= John Simonds (trade unionist) =

British trade Union leader

John Simonds (26 June 1883 – 29 May 1945) was a British trade union leader.

Simonds qualified as a barrister. He became active in the National Poor Law Officers' Association (NPLOA), rising to become its assistant general secretary in 1910, and was elected as general secretary in 1912. He tried unsuccessfully to bring about a merger with the Poor Law Officers' Union, while opposing unification with the National Association of Local Government Officers (NALGO).

Poor law officers were employed by Boards of Guardians. In 1929, these were abolished, and members' employment was transferred to local authorities. NALGO took the opportunity to try to recruit NPLOA branches individually. Simonds strongly opposed this, but was spurred to negotiated a merger. This took place in 1930, and Simonds was made NALGO's legal officer, given his background in law, and he created a legal department, with particular expertise in superannuation law.

In 1936, Simonds was promoted to become deputy general secretary of NALGO, and in 1943, he succeeded as its general secretary. However, he died unexpectedly only two years later.

Trade union offices
Preceded by ?	Deputy General Secretary of the National Association of Local Government Officers; 1937–1943	Succeeded by J. B. Swinden
Preceded by Levi Hill	General Secretary of the National Association of Local Government Officers; 1943–1945	Succeeded by Haden Corser (acting)
