= David Williams (trade unionist) =

Welsh trade union leader (1926–2025)

David Oliver Williams (12 March 1926 – 21 February 2025) was a Welsh trade union leader.

== Life and career ==
Williams was born on 12 March 1926. He was educated at Brynrefail Grammar School before qualifying as a Registered Mental Nurse at the North Wales Hospital in Denbigh. He became active in the Confederation of Health Service Employees (COHSE), and worked for the union full-time from 1955, when he became its Yorkshire Regional Officer.

In 1962, Williams moved to COHSE's head office as a National Officer, then was successively promoted to Senior National Officer and Assistant General Secretary. From 1977, he chaired the Whitley Council for nurses and midwives. Also active in the Labour Party, he served on its National Executive Committee from 1981 until 1983, when he was instead elected to the General Council of the Trades Union Congress (TUC).

In 1983, Williams was elected as the General Secretary of COHSE, serving until his retirement in 1987. In retirement, he served as an occasional adviser to the World Health Organization. Williams died on 21 February 2025, at the age of 98.

Trade union offices
Preceded by Albert Spanswick	Assistant General Secretary of the Confederation of Health Service Employees; 1974–1983	Succeeded by Hector MacKenzie
Preceded by Albert Spanswick	General Secretary of the Confederation of Health Service Employees; 1983–1987	Succeeded by Hector MacKenzie
