= Albert Spanswick =

Ernest Albert George Spanswick (2 October 1919 – 27 April 1983) was a British trade unionist.

Born in Parkstone, Spanswick served with the Royal Army Medical Corps during World War II. After the war, he qualified as a State Registered Nurse and a Registered Mental Nurse. He also joined the Confederation of Health Service Employees (COHSE). In 1959, he began working full-time for the union, as its Northern Regional Officer. Three years later, he was promoted to become National Officer, then became Assistant General Secretary in 1969.

Spanswick was elected as General Secretary of COHSE, taking over in 1974. In 1977, he was elected to the General Council of the Trades Union Congress (TUC), and also became chair of its Health Services Committee. Associated with the right wing of the trade union movement, he was known as a poor public speaker who often made gaffes, but became a prominent public figure during a year-long pay dispute.

Spanswick was due to retire in October 1983, but he died suddenly in April.

Trade union offices
Preceded by Frank Lynch	Assistant General Secretary of the Confederation of Health Service Employees; 1969–1974	Succeeded by David Williams
Preceded by Frank Lynch	General Secretary of the Confederation of Health Service Employees; 1974–1983	Succeeded by David Williams
