= Platform Home Loans =

Platform Home Loans is the intermediary mortgage lending subsidiary of The Co-operative Bank. The current incarnation of the firm was launched in February 2003 following the merger of Britannia Building Society subsidiaries Platform Home Loans and Verso. The firm became part of the Co-operative Bank group when that firm merged with Britannia in 2009.

The firm originally began trading in 1989 as the centralised mortgage lender of Bear Stearns Home Loans. In 1992 it became Platform Home Loans when it was sold to Lehman Brothers and in 1997 it was acquired by U.S. sub-prime lender The Money Store. In 1999 it was acquired by Cabot Square Capital.
