= Britannia Staff Union =

British trade union

- Merged into: Unite
- Founded: 1972
- Dissolved: 1 July 2018
- Headquarters: Leek, Staffordshire
- Location: United Kingdom
- Members: 1,158
- Key people: John Stoddard, general secretary
- Affiliations: TUC, Alliance for Finance
- Website: britanniasu.org.uk

The Britannia Staff Union was a trade union in the United Kingdom.

The union was founded in 1972 as the Leek and Westbourne Building Society Staff Association, and was certified as an independent union in 1976. In 1984, it was renamed the Britannia Building Society Staff Association, becoming the Britannia Staff Union in 1994. In 1999, it affiliated to the Trades Union Congress. The union organised workers at the Britannia division of The Co-operative Bank, where it had a high membership density - 76% in 2004.

In July 2018, the union merged into Unite.
