= 1981 University of London Chancellor election =

The 1981 University of London election for the position of Chancellor was called upon when the incumbent Chancellor, Queen Elizabeth the Queen Mother, announced in December 1980 that she was retiring from the position. It was the first occasion in the university's history when the position was formally contested.

== Electorate and rules ==
The electorate consisted of the entire graduate body of the University of London, as assembled in Convocation, a right secured in 1898. Anyone holding a University of London degree and who had paid a £5 registration fee was entitled to vote, making for a total electorate of around 83,000.

To be nominated a candidate required the signature of ten members of Convocation. In the event of only one candidate standing they would be declared elected nem con. If more than one candidate stood, a postal ballot would be conducted.

== Candidates ==
Nominations closed on 22 December 1980. The following candidates were nominated:

- The Princess Anne, only daughter of Elizabeth II of the United Kingdom and granddaughter of The Queen Mother.
- Jack Jones, former General Secretary of the Transport and General Workers' Union
- Nelson Mandela, anti-apartheid activist, a leader of the African National Congress and convicted prisoner in South Africa; graduate of the university, having completed an LLB through the External Programme whilst in prison.

== Course of the election ==
There was much criticism voiced in the press by graduates about the way in which the election was handled. Initially Princess Anne was the only candidate nominated, leading to some criticism amongst graduates, even though every previous Chancellor had been elected unopposed. Several expressed dismay that the election had been called at very short notice (when a period of up to six months was permissible under the regulations) and at a time when the postal service was slower than usual, due to the extra demands of Christmas, making it harder to get the ten signatures together to stand. The university's standing committee came in for especial criticism for the deadlines it set.

At the formal meeting of Convocation two motions were passed regarding the way the election had been conducted. The university's standing committee was censured for "unseemly and unbecoming haste" in the first motion, whilst the second motion demanded that in future there be a minimum of three months between the resignation/death of the Chancellor and the close of nominations.

== Result ==
The deadline for the return of ballots was 14 February. Originally the results of the election were due to be declared on 16 February. However, due to a higher than expected number of ballot papers being returned, the declaration was delayed by a day. In total some 42,212 ballot papers were submitted, in contrast to the last contested election by Convocation in which only 5,083 ballots were returned for the position of chairperson.

The results were as follows:

Candidate	Votes	%
The Princess Anne	23,951	57.5
Jack Jones	10,507	25.2
Nelson Mandela	7,199	17.3
Void/Spoilt	555	N/A
Valid	41,657	98.7
Turnout	42,212	
The Princess Anne elected
