= Jeannie Drake, Baroness Drake =

British trade unionist and Labour life peer

The Right Honourable The Baroness Drake CBE
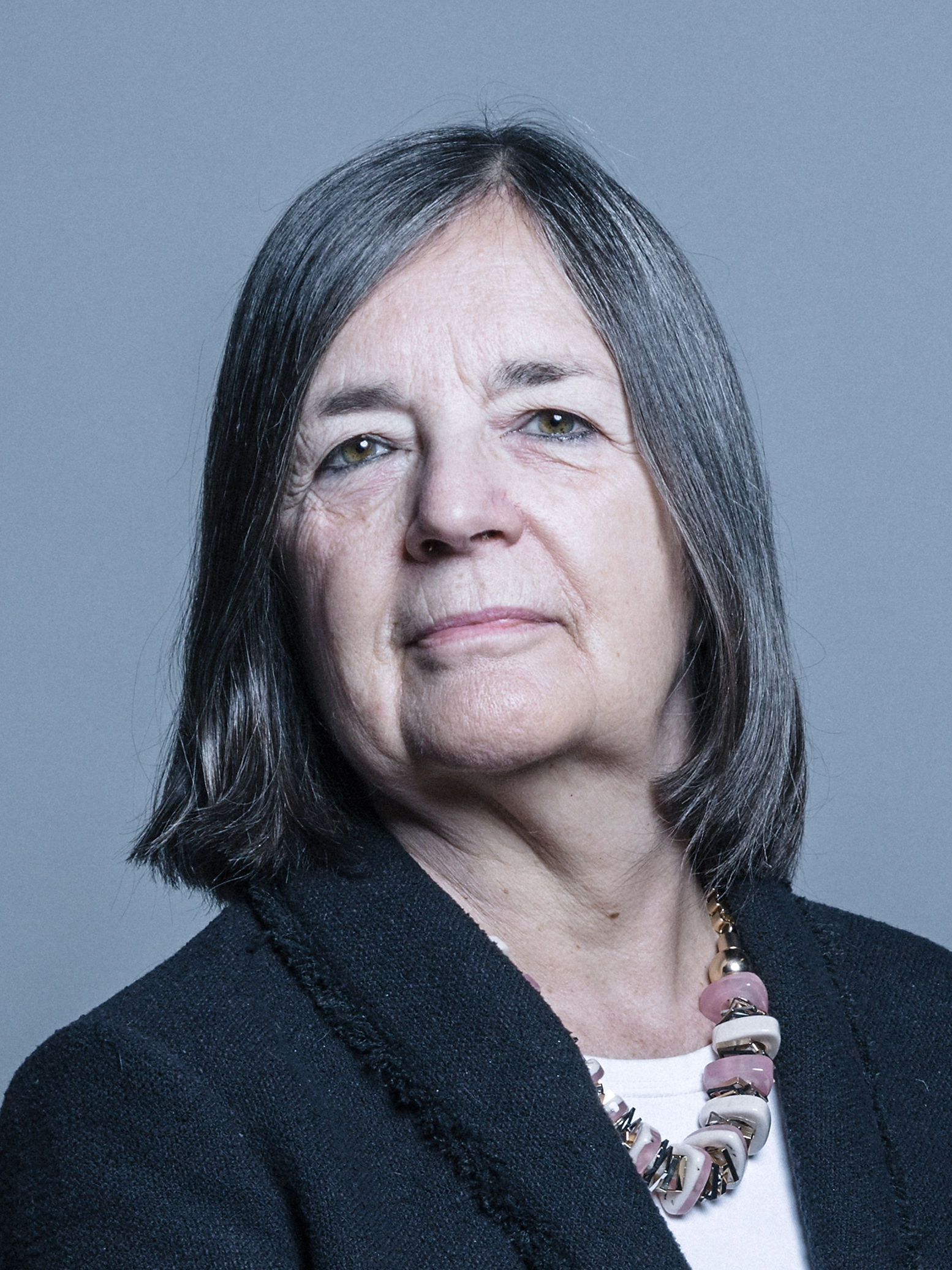
- Official Portrait
- Born: Jean Lesley Patricia Drake; 16 January 1948 (age 78)

Member of the House of Lords
- Lord Temporal
- Life peerage 20 June 2010

Jean Lesley Patricia Drake, Baroness Drake, CBE (born 16 January 1948) is an English trade unionist and Labour life peer in the House of Lords.

== Biography ==
After attending university, Drake worked as a research officer at the National Union of Public Employees, before moving to the Civil and Public Services Association in 1976. Drake was a Deputy General Secretary of the National Communications Union and, following a merger in 1995, she held the same position in the Communication Workers Union until 2008. During her tenure, she was also President of the Trades Union Congress in 2005, and supported a 24-hour strike by workers at a Birmingham factory owned by Japanese company Fujitsu, over jobs being moved to the United States.

Drake serves as a trustee of the O2 and Alliance & Leicester pension funds, has been a board member of the Pension Protection Fund since 2004, and was appointed to the board of trustees of The People's Pension in 2020. She was Deputy Chair of the National Employment Savings Trust (NEST). She also sits an independent member of the Private Equity Reporting Group.

She was a commissioner of the Equality and Human Rights Commission from 2006 to 2009. She has also served as a member of the Employment Appeal Tribunal. On 20 June 2010, she was created a life peer in the House of Lords as Baroness Drake, of Shene in the County of Surrey.

In the House of Lords, Drake has chaired the House of Lords Constitution Committee, where she worked on an enquiry about the relationship between UK Government and the devolved governments of Scotland, Wales and Northern Ireland. After the introduction of mandatory photographic IDs for voting, Drake warned how young and elderly people, people with disabilities, and people from ethnic minority backgrounds often do not own a photo ID that is accepted at polling stations and suggested voter authority certificates (VAC) to address this inequality.

Drake was one of the founders of the government auto-enrolment pensions scheme, and later lodged an amendment in the Lords to the Pension Schemes Bill to introduce a carer’s credit paid through the social security system towards a private pension.

Drake also speaks at events, such as on a panel about women and pensions at the 2017 Women of the World Festival, organised by the Fawcett Society.

Trade union offices
Preceded by Roger Lyons	President of the Trades Union Congress; 2005	Succeeded by Gloria Mills
