= Mental Hospital and Institutional Workers' Union =

Former trade union of the United Kingdom

The Mental Hospital and Institutional Workers' Union was a trade union in the United Kingdom.

The union was established as the National Asylum Workers' Union in 1910 by asylum attendants in Lancashire. George Gibson became its General Secretary in 1912, and served in post for the remainder of the union's existence.

In 1918 it organised strikes at Prestwich Hospital, Whittingham Hospital and Bodmin Hospital. It threatened to organise strikes in all the London asylums in support of a 48-hour week.

In 1916, the union lost its membership in Southern Ireland to the Irish Mental Hospital Workers' Union. In 1931, it changed its name to the "Mental Hospital and Institutional Workers Union".

In 1946, the union merged with the Hospital and Welfare Services Union to form the Confederation of Health Service Employees (COHSE). By this stage, it had secured a very high membership amongst mental hospital staff, including the vast majority of mental hospital nurses
