= Herbert Blain =

Sir Herbert Edwin Blain CBE
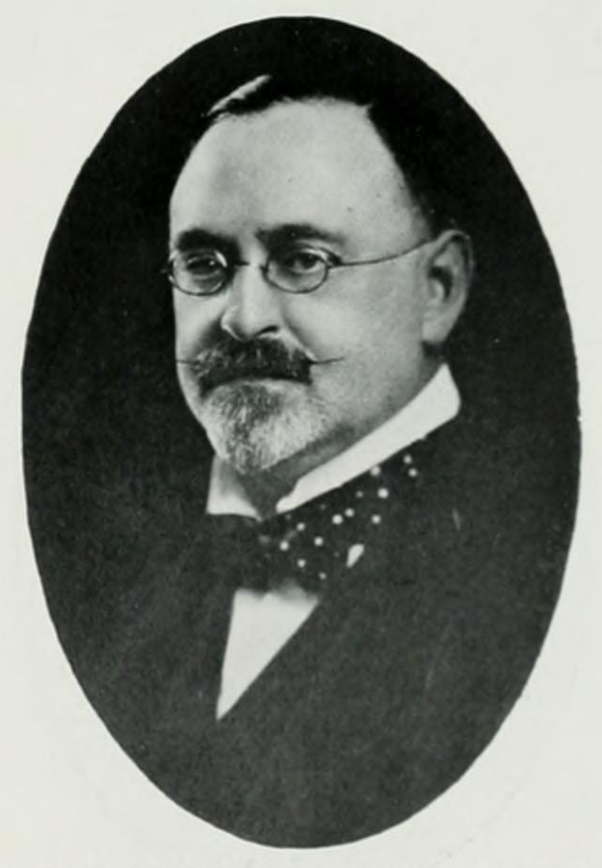
- Photographic portrait of Herbert Edwin Blain

Personal details
- Born: Herbert Edwin Blain; 14 May 1870 Liverpool, Lancashire, England
- Died: 16 December 1942 (aged 72) Burgess Hill, Sussex

Sir Herbert Edwin Blain CBE (14 May 1870 – 16 December 1942) was a British local government administrator, safety campaigner, political agent and businessman who played a pioneering role in the development of 'white-collar' trade unionism amongst municipal workers.

Blain's organising activities establishing inclusive local government associations at Liverpool and West Ham led to his pivotal involvement in the formation in 1905 of a national body representing local government 'white collar' workers. In the period 1913 to early 1924 Blain held prominent positions in a corporate group integral to London's transport system. He was actively involved in transport and safety matters during this period. From about May 1924 to late 1926 Blain was the principal agent of the Conservative Party, appointed after the party's defeat at the December 1923 general election and given to task of modernising the party organisation. From the late 1920s Blain was a director of various companies.

== Biography ==
=== Early years ===
Herbert Edwin Blain was born on 14 May 1870 at Liverpool in county Lancashire, the son of Arbuthnot Harrison Blain and Elizabeth (née Stalker). His father was a chemist and druggist. Herbert was educated at Liverpool Technical School.

=== Local government ===
In 1886 Blain began his working career as a clerk working for the Liverpool Corporation, the local government authority for the city of Liverpool. During his time with the Liverpool Corporation, Blain rose to become the principal traffic assistant of the tramways department.

Herbert Blain married Clara Louisa Brake on 26 October 1892. The couple had one child, a son named Eric born in May 1904.

Blain was skilled in shorthand and during the 1890s he held prominent roles in the National Federation of Shorthand Writers Associations, serving at various times as secretary, treasurer and president.

In 1896, on his own initiative, Blain formed the Liverpool Municipal Officers' Guild, an association which opened its membership to all local government officers in the city, regardless of grade "from the town clerk to the office boy". The objectives of the Liverpool guild was to "provide means for social intercourse amongst its members, and for their improvement, advancement, and recreation, also promote a knowledge of the principles of local government". It was the first inclusive association of local government officers in Britain, as previous associations limited membership to chief and senior officers or had a narrow objective to implement pensions. In order to secure its position, Blain appointed prominent local officials and politicians to honorary positions in the guild. He persuaded Sir William Forwood, a prominent Liverpool merchand and previous Lord Mayor of the city, to take on the role of the guild's first honorary president. The Liverpool Municipal Officers' Guild organised a wide range of social, educational and sporting activities for its members and their families. Within a short period the guild, with Blain as its chairman, proved to be an efficiently run and highly successful friendly society with 1,200 members, supported by their employers. The success of the Liverpool guild encouraged Blain to extend the idea to other local authorities. Over the next few years he worked with staff at other authorities, resulting in similar guilds being formed at localities such as Hull, Derby, Oldham, Tunbridge Wells and Macclesfield.

=== NALGO ===
With the growing success of local government employees' guilds, Blain began to envisage the possibility of forming a national organisation linking the local guilds. In 1902 the vice-chairman of the Municipal Officers' Association (MOA), a London-based organisation formed in 1894 with the singular purpose of seeking legislative reform to establish pensions for local government officers, travelled to Liverpool to invite the guild to join forces with the MOA. Since its formation the MOA had been frustrated in its attempts to establish pensions for local government officers, resulting in falling membership numbers. Blain and his colleagues had minimal interest in superannuation, as Liverpool was one of only a few local authorities giving pensions to its staff, but nevertheless agreed to join with the MOA. In October 1903 the MOA and the Liverpool guild sent a joint circular to all known guilds, urging the transformation, "on a large and influential scale", of the Municipal Officers' Association into a national body. The stated aims of the association included pensions for all officers, transferable between authorities, and greater security of tenure.

Several weeks prior to the joint circular being sent, Blain had left Liverpool to become manager of the newly-created tramways department at West Ham in east London. After his arrival he joined the MOA, but found the organisation in a moribund state, with dissolution a distinct possibility. Bringing his organisational skills to bear, Blain met with the MOA president and solicitor to the City of London Corporation, Sir Homewood Crawford, and persuaded him to oppose dissolution in favour of a reorganised national body. In June 1904 a reorganisation committee was formed, with Blain as chairman. At a meeting in November 1904 a new executive was elected, with Blain as vice-chairman, determined to restructure the MOA along Liverpool lines.

On 29 July 1905 a conference was held at the Inns of Court Hotel in High Holborn, attended by fourteen men representing seven provincial guilds (Bolton, Derby, Hull, Midlands, Oldham, Peterborough and Woolwich), the MOA and the Institute of Municipal and County Engineers. The Liverpool guild was not represented, but had sent a message approving the proposals to be put to the meeting. Blain was elected chairman. The meeting resulted in the formation of the National Association of Local Government Officers (NALGO), with an initial membership of five thousand, pledged to work for pensions, security of tenure, and "other matters of national importance" to its members, as well as "to encourage the interest and working of district and local associations and guilds". Within three months after the inaugural meeting the first National Executive Council, representing the founding guilds plus West Ham, Ilford and Bradford, met at Derby. The meeting created 'missionary' sub-committees to encourage and assist the formation of new guilds. Two months later the MOA was subsumed into NALGO.

In 1906 Blain approached the publishers Hodgetts Ltd. and persuaded them to convert their weekly magazine, The Public Health Engineer, to become NALGO's official journal, renamed The Local Government Officer and Contractor. By this stage NALGO's membership had reached ten thousand, so the increased circulation had the potential to boost advertising revenue. The journal was published under its new name in September 1906. Blain contributed a weekly column to the journal using the pen-name 'A Candid Friend'.

In the early years of NALGO its leaders "repeatedly and emphatically disavowed every suggestion that the Association was or might become a trade union". NALGO had been founded and was being run predominantly by the chief officers of local government bodies, most of whom were politically conservative, and it was generally considered that NALGO and local authorities were mutually supportive of each other. In general municipal officers considered themselves to be socially superior to the workers in manual or skilled professions, for whom trade unions had been established. To call themselves 'trade unionists' would have been a renouncement of status for municipal employees, allying themselves with socialism and the extremes of industrial action.

In 1908, however, the cosy relationship between NALGO and municipal authorities was put under strain. In October 1908 East Ham Council announced its intention to dismiss twenty-two officers, as well as reduce the wages and conditions of employment of the remainder of its staff, causing anger and consternation amongst the NALGO membership. The announcement had been made less than a month before the municipal election, which Blain saw as an opportunity. He enlisted the support of Francis May, the editor of the Municipal Journal, to assist in opposing the election of every councillor who had supported the dismissals, each of them members of the 'Municipal Alliance' party. May was not a member of NALGO, nor a local government officer, so his involvement was seen as detached and objective. Members of neighbouring guilds were mobilised to act as election agents for rival candidates, to canvass for them and write speeches. Blain's tactics proved to be highly successful. Each 'Municipal Alliance' councillor who had supported the cuts was defeated. The new council rescinded its predecessors' decisions and agreed to retain the dismissed staff.

During his years of municipal service at West Ham, Blain was a member of the executive of the Municipal Tramways Association and served as its president during the period 1910 to 1913. The West Ham Corporation Tramways hosted the 1912 annual conference of the Municipal Tramways Association in September that year.

=== Transport and safety ===
In June 1913 Blain left local government employment and became the purchasing agent for the Underground Electric Railways Company of London Ltd. In the following October he was appointed operating manager of the London General Omnibus Company, recently-acquired by the Underground Railways Company, and in January 1915 he was appointed as the operating manager for the whole of the group's transport system, comprising railways, buses and tramways. During World War I Blain assisted in providing motor transport and personnel, in training drivers for the Army Services Corps and providing air raid shelter facilities.

In early December 1916 Blain was responsible for organising a conference at Caxton Hall in Westminster, "with a view to lessening the dangers of street traffic". A resolution was passed at the meeting to form the London "Safety First" Council, the first meeting which was held in January 1917. Blain was elected as one of the honorary secretaries of the body.

In about October 1918 the British Industrial "Safety First" Association was formed "with the object of preventing industrial accidents". Blain served as the honorary secretary of the association.

In October 1920 Blain was invested as a Commander (civil division) of the Most Excellent Order of the British Empire (CBE).

In January 1921 Blain was appointed assistant managing director of the London transportation group. In May 1921 he travelled to Canada and the United States, where he visited a number of cities to study their transport methods. He provided advice to the Toronto Transportation Commission on its transport problems.

Blain served on the Technical Committee on London Traffic. He was involved in the formation of the Institute of Transport and served as its honorary secretary until October 1923. Upon his retirement from transport in favour of his interest in politics in early 1924, Blain was elected as the first honorary life member of the Institute of Transport. In March 1924 the British Industrial "Safety First" Association agreed to merge with the newly-created National "Safety First" Association (NFSA) at a meeting presided by Blain at Caxton Hall in Westminster.

=== The Conservative Party ===
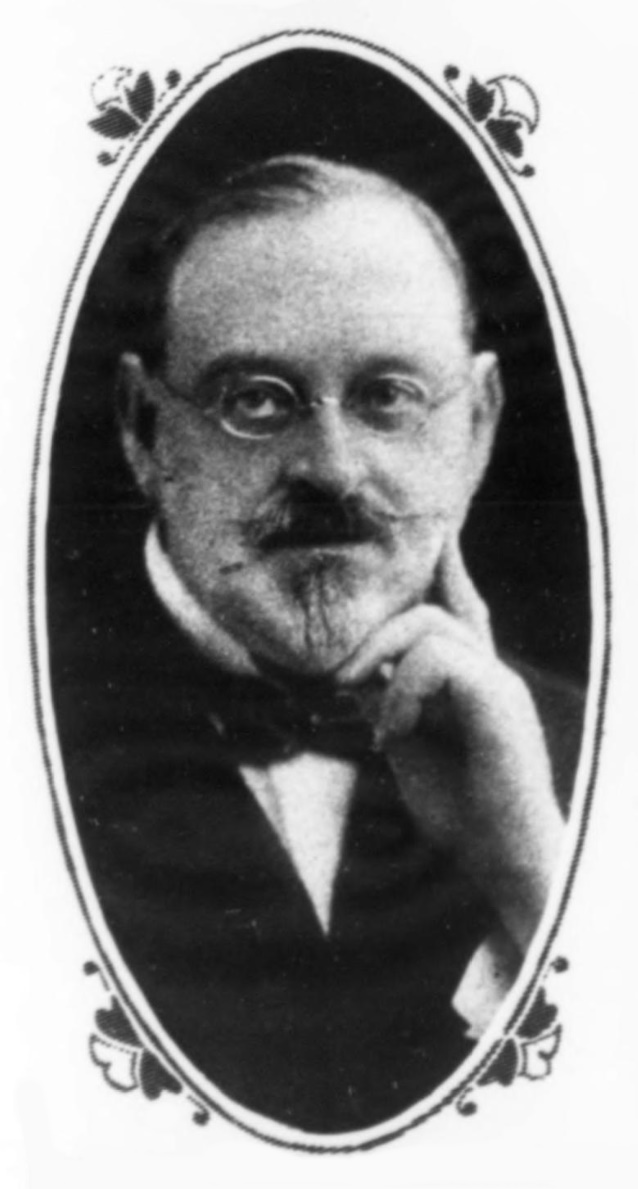
Photographic portrait of Herbert Edwin Blain, published in Illustrated London News, 8 March 1924.

In about May 1924 Blain was appointed as principal agent of the Conservative and Unionist Party, hired as a business efficiency expert and given the task of modernising the party's organisation after it lost office to the Labour Party (supported by the Liberals), as a result of the general election of December 1923. Blain's predecessor had been Admiral Sir Reginald Hall, who was blamed for the loss of the 1923 election and resigned as principal agent early in 1924 after a breakdown in his health. The Conservatives managed to regain a parliamentary majority in the general election held in October 1924.

In the 1925 Birthday Honours Blain was awarded a knighthood "for political and public services".

In November 1926 it was reported that Blain was retiring as principal agent of the Conservative Party after two and a half years in the job. His resignation coincided with the resignation of Colonel F. S. Jackson, who had been chairman of the Conservative Party organisation. In announcing the imminent resignation of both men, a writer for The Tatler described Blain as "emphatically the square man in a round hole". He was likened to "an American hustler" who is "about to return to the more congenial sphere of commerce".

=== Company directorships ===
In January 1927 the Non-Inflammable Film Company was floated, of which Blain was the chairman of directors. The company was formed to acquire the sole rights, throughout the British Empire (with the exception of Canada), of "certain secret processes" in the manufacture of cellulose acetate and its conversion into non-inflammable cinema film.

In May 1928 Blain was listed as a director of the following companies: Property and General Finance Corporation Ltd., Blandy Bros. & Co. (London) Ltd., Palmerston Trust Ltd., Newtex Safety Glass Company Ltd., Westminster City Properties Ltd. and Property Marketing Company Ltd. He was also recorded as the chairman of the Non-Inflammable Film Company Ltd.

=== Last years ===
Blain's wife Clara died in April 1940. Sir Herbert Blain married Mrs. Carol Louise McDowell on 2 May 1940.

Sir Herbert Blain died on 16 December 1942 at his home at Burgess Hill in county Sussex, aged 72.

== Publications ==
- Herbert E. Blain (editor) (1908), Pitman's Secretary's Handbook, London: Sir Isaac Pitman & Sons Ltd. (re-released in subsequent editions).
- Lawrence R. Dicksee & Herbert E. Blain (1914), Office Organisation and Management including Secretarial Work, London: Sir Isaac Pitman & Sons Ltd. (re-released in subsequent editions).

Party political offices
Preceded by Reginald Hall	Principal Agent of the Conservative Party; 1924 – 1926	Succeeded by Leigh Maclachlan
