= National and Local Government Officers' Association =

Former trade union of the United Kingdom

- Merged into: Unison
- Founded: 1905
- Dissolved: 1993
- Headquarters: 1 Mabledon Place, London WC1H 9AJ
- Location: United Kingdom
- Members: 739,000 (1981)
- Publication: Public Service
- Affiliations: TUC (from 1965)

The National and Local Government Officers' Association was a British trade union representing mostly local government "white collar" workers. It was formed in 1905 as the National Association of Local Government Officers, and changed its full name in 1952 while retaining its widely used acronym, NALGO. By the late 1970s it was the largest British white collar trade union, with over 700,000 members. It was one of three unions which combined to form UNISON in 1993.

== Early history ==
The National Association of Local Government Officers, or NALGO, was founded in 1905 as an association of local guilds of municipal officers. The main impetus came from Herbert Blain (1870–1942), later to become national agent for the Conservative Party. Blain had formed the first local guild in Liverpool in 1896 and, on moving to London, arranged the national conference in 1905 at which NALGO was formed. In 1909, the first full-time General Secretary, Levi Hill (1883–1961), was appointed, and by 1914 NALGO's membership included almost 70% of all British local government officers.

Blain and Hill organised NALGO with a national delegate conference and regional and local branch structures. Its first aims were the setting up of a pension scheme; the improvement of the pay, conditions and status of local government officers; the abolition of nepotism (at the time rife in local government); and the welfare of members and their families.

In 1917, a parliamentary committee chaired by J. H. Whitley MP recommended setting up joint committees of employers and workers throughout industry for consultations on pay and working conditions, and in 1919 the first Whitley Council for local government was formed on NALGO's insistence. After a prolonged process of negotiations, NALGO and the employers agreed a national charter of pay scales in local government in 1946.

Although Hill had previously remarked that "anything savouring of trade unionism is nausea to the local government officer", NALGO sought a certificate from the Registrar of Friendly Societies confirming its status as a trade union in 1920. Discussion on affiliation to the Trades Union Congress began as early as 1921, however, it would take until 1964 to be agreed.

It amalgamated with various smaller unions including the National Association of Poor Law Officers in 1930. Membership continued to grow rapidly, reaching some 100,000 by 1940.

Levi Hill retired as General Secretary in 1943, and was replaced by John Simonds.

== National and Local ==
With the growth in membership in sectors outside local government such as health, gas and electricity, the union changed its full name in 1952, to the National and Local Government Officers' Association, while still retaining the acronym NALGO. It amalgamated with various smaller unions including the British Gas Staff Association in 1963. It reached 300,000 members by 1964. It finally became a TUC affiliate, after many years of fractious internal argument, in 1964.

NALGO Building Society merged with the Leek and Moorlands Building Society in 1960.

As the public sector expanded in importance from the 1950s to the 1970s, and British Government legislation such as the Industrial Relations Act 1971 simultaneously sought to curb trade union powers, some parts of the union became more radicalised. NALGO organised its first official strike in Leeds in 1970, and its first national strike, of social workers, was in 1978/79. It also led the way as a campaigning organisation over equal pay and wider equality and international issues. Total membership rose to over 700,000 by 1977, by which time it was by far the largest UK public sector union.

After the election of the Thatcher government in 1979, NALGO organised strongly in opposition to many of its policies, in particular privatisation, deregulation, and restructuring with the introduction of market mechanisms in local government, education, and the National Health Service.

At the same time, at local level in much of the country many members maintained the old idea of NALGO as a staff association, and this explains why many so-called "NALGO" social clubs, sports teams and so on remained popular. NALGO provided a wide range of benefits for its members and opened one of the first holiday camps in Britain, at Croyde Bay in north Devon. Shortly afterwards it built a second, larger camp at Cayton Bay near Scarborough. This was sold in 1976 but the Croyde Bay holiday centre is still owned and run by NALGO's successor, UNISON.

NALGO merged with NUPE (the National Union of Public Employees) and COHSE (the Confederation of Health Service Employees) in 1993 to form UNISON. NALGO Insurance Association was renamed UIA shortly afterwards.

== General Secretaries ==
- 1905: Frank Ginn (Honorary Secretary)
- 1909: Levi Hill
- 1943: John Simonds
- 1945: Haden Corser (acting)
- 1946: John Warren
- 1957: Walter Anderson
- 1973: Geoffrey Drain
- 1983: John Daly
- 1990: Alan Jinkinson

== Deputy General Secretaries ==
- 1936: John Simonds
- 1943: Haden Corser
- 1950: Walter Anderson
- 1957: Geoffrey Drain
- 1973: George Newman
- 1976: Bill Rankin
- 1982: John Daly
- 1983: Alan Jinkinson
- 1990: Dave Prentis

== Presidents ==
- 1906: Edward Ralph Pickmere
- 1907: Homewood Crawford
- 1924: Arthur P. Johnson
- 1931: Sam Lord
- 1932: Fred Marsden
- 1933: C. G. Brown
- 1934: Allan Wotherspoon
- 1935: G. W. Coster
- 1936: W. E. Lloyd
- 1937: W. W. Armitage
- 1938: J. L. Holland
- 1939: E. J. Stead
- 1943: Colin A. W. Roberts
- 1944: Alfred A. Garrard
- 1945: Frank Henry Harrod
- 1946: D. J. Parry
- 1947: Cyril J. Newman
- 1948: Philip H. Harrold
- 1949: Ernest A. S. Young
- 1950: Edward L. Riley
- 1951: Lewis Bevan
- 1952: Watson Strother
- 1953: Thomas Nolan
- 1954: L. H. Taylor
- 1955: Philip H. Harrold
- 1956: John Pepper
- 1957: Alfred E. Odell
- 1958: Albert E. Nortrop
- 1959: Norman W. Bingham
- 1960: Tom Belton
- 1961: Raymond Evans
- 1962: George R. Ashton
- 1963: Leslie W. G. Hetherington
- 1964: Charles A. Smallman
- 1965: Stephen Duncan
- 1966: Marian W. Curtin
- 1967: James G. Iles
- 1968: Edward J. Varley
- 1969: Tim J. Hutton
- 1970: Neil McLean
- 1971: Ellery H. Clayton
- 1972: Joe Besserman
- 1973: Jimmy J. Gardner
- 1974: Ron W. E. Hill
- 1975: Arthur H. Buckley
- 1976: Harold S. Corden
- 1977: Glyn J. Phillips
- 1978: Edward Alderton
- 1979: John A. Meek
- 1980: Peter Morgan
- 1981: John Allan
- 1982: Peter Holt
- 1983: Arthur Steer
- 1984: Bill Gill
- 1985: Norrie Steele
- 1986: Sheila Smith
- 1987: John Saunders
- 1988: Bill Seawright
- 1989: Rita Donaghy
- 1990: David Stockford
- 1991: Mike Blick
- 1992: Ralph Gayton

== Sources ==
- Alec Spoor (1967) White Collar Union – sixty years of NALGO
- George Newman (1982) Path To Maturity – NALGO 1965-1980
- Mike Ironside and Roger Seifert (2001) Facing Up to Thatcherism: The History of NALGO 1979-93
