= Confederation of Health Service Employees =

Former trade union of the United Kingdom

- Merged into: Unison
- Founded: 1946
- Dissolved: 1993
- Headquarters: Glen House, High Street, Banstead
- Location: United Kingdom
- Members: 216,000 (1980)
- Publication: Health Services
- Affiliations: TUC, Labour

The Confederation of Health Service Employees (COHSE) was a United Kingdom trade union representing workers primarily in the National Health Service.

== History ==
The union was founded in 1946 with the merger of the Mental Hospital and Institutional Workers Union and the Hospital and Welfare Services Union, with the aim of having one union to represent workers in the National Health Service on its formation.

In 1993, COHSE merged with two other trade unions - NUPE (the National Union of Public Employees) and NALGO (the National and Local Government Officers Association ) - to form UNISON, the largest public sector trade union in the UK.

=== Major COHSE campaigns ===
1948: Nursing Students Pay
1959: Unofficial Overtime ban
1962: Nurses Pay (Lets twist again)
1972–73: Ancillary Pay strikes (Low pay)
1974: Nurses Pay (Halsbury)
1974?: Private Patients Dispute
1979: Public Sector Pay (Winter of Discontent)
1982: NHS Staff Pay campaign (12%claim)
1988: Nurses Pay (Clinical Grading)
1989–1990: Ambulance Dispute

=== Election results ===
The union sponsored Labour Party candidates at each Parliamentary election from 1979.

Election	Constituency	Candidate	Votes	Percentage	Position
1979 general election	Dudley West	Mike Hartley-Brewer	29,109	49.1	2
1979 general election	Ealing North	William Molloy	26,044	43.6	2
1979 general election	Fife Central	Willie Hamilton	27,619	58.0	1
1979 general election	Loughborough	John Cronin	24,589	39.6	2
1979 general election	Oldham West	Michael Meacher	17,802	52.4	1
1979 general election	Rhondda	Alec Jones	38,007	75.2	1
1983 general election	Central Fife	Willie Hamilton	17,008	43.1	1
1983 general election	Oldham West	Michael Meacher	17,690	44.1	1
1983 general election	Rhondda	Allan Rogers	29,448	61.7	1
1987 general election	Oldham West	Michael Meacher	20,291	49.4	1
1987 general election	Redcar	Mo Mowlam	22,824	47.3	1
1987 general election	Rhondda	Allan Rogers	35,015	73.4	1
1987 general election	Stoke-on-Trent North	Joan Walley	25,459	47.1	1
1987 general election	Workington	Dale Campbell-Savours	24,019	52.4	1
1992 general election	Falkirk West	Dennis Canavan	19,162	49.8	1
1992 general election	Oldham West	Michael Meacher	21,580	52.8	1
1992 general election	Redcar	Mo Mowlam	27,184	56.0	1
1992 general election	Rhondda	Allan Rogers	34,243	74.5	1
1992 general election	Stoke-on-Trent North	Joan Walley	30,464	56.7	1
1992 general election	Wallasey	Angela Eagle	26,531	48.9	1
1992 general election	Workington	Dale Campbell-Savours	26,719	56.9	1

== Leadership ==
=== General Secretaries ===
1946: George Gibson
1947: Cliff Comer
1953: Jack Waite
1958: Jack Jepson
1967: Dick Akers
1969: Frank Lynch
1974: Albert Spanswick
1983: David Williams
1987: Hector MacKenzie

=== Presidents ===
1946: Claude Bartlett
1962: Ron Farmer
1965: Bob Vickerstaff
1976: Eric Wilson
1982: Sid Ambler
1987: Colin Robinson
