= Unison (trade union) =

British trade union

UNISON – The Public Service Union
- Founded: July 1, 1993; 33 years ago
- Headquarters: 130 Euston Road, London NW1 2AY
- Location: United Kingdom
- Members: ▲1,438,132 (2024)
- General Secretary: Andrea Egan
- President: James Anthony [3]
- Affiliations: TUC, STUC, ICTU, ETUC, The European Federation of Public Service Unions, ITUC, (PSI), Labour Party
- Website: www.unison.org.uk

Unison (stylised as UNISON) is the largest trade union in the United Kingdom, with over 1.3 million members who work predominantly in public services, including local government, education, health and outsourced services.

The union was formed in 1993 when three public sector trade unions, the National and Local Government Officers Association (NALGO), the National Union of Public Employees (NUPE) and the Confederation of Health Service Employees (COHSE) merged. Since 22 January 2026, UNISON's general secretary has been Andrea Egan. Egan is a member of the union's broad left faction, Time for Real Change.

== Members and organisation ==
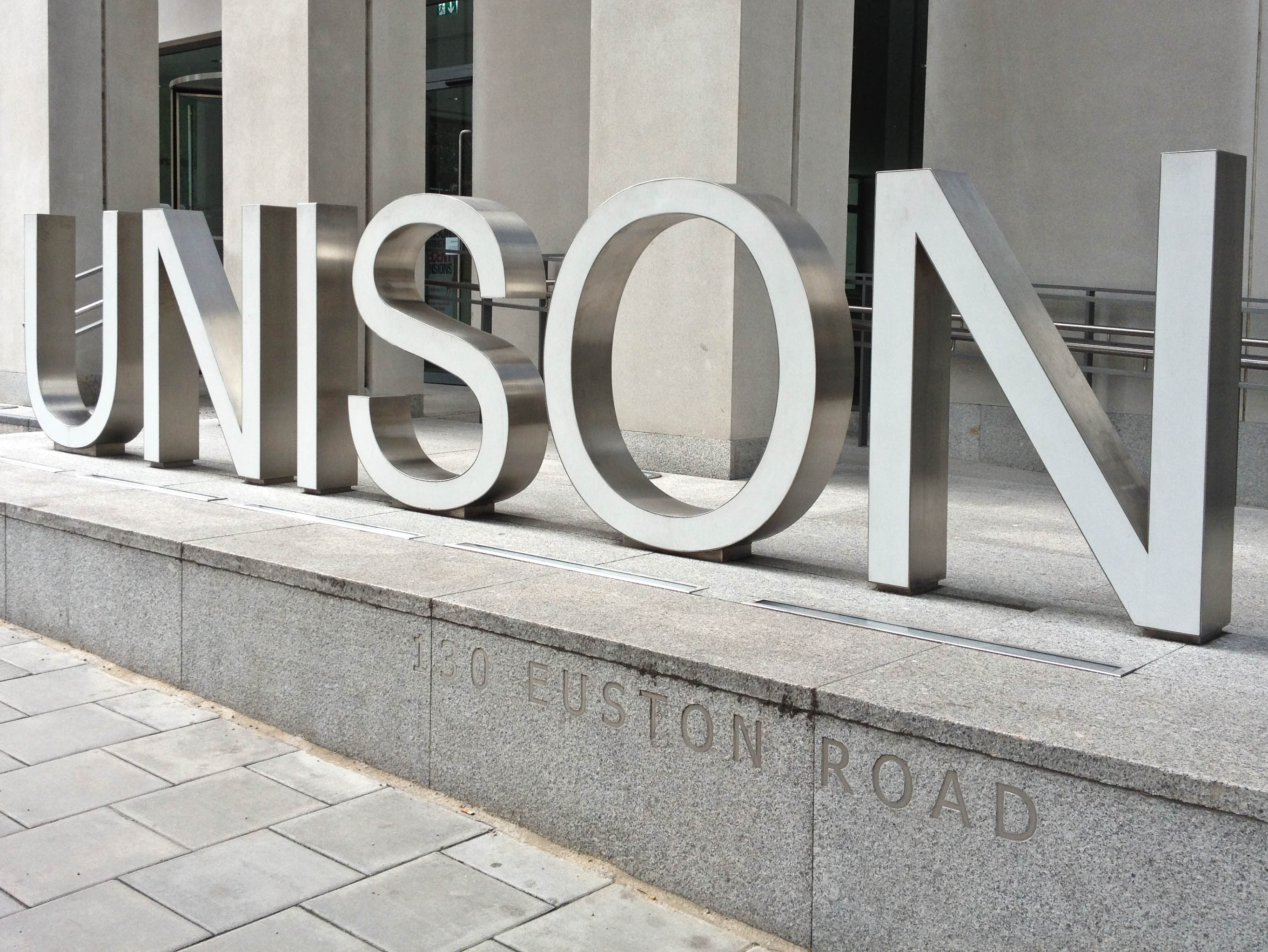
UNISON sign outside their headquarters on Euston Road, London

Members of UNISON are typically from industries within the public sector and generally cover both full-time and part-time support and administrative staff. The majority of people joining UNISON are workers within sectors such as local government, education, the National Health Service Registered Nurses, NHS Managers and Clinical Support Workers. The union also admits ancillary staff such as Health Care Assistants and Assistant Practitioners, including Allied Health Professionals. Probation services, police services, utilities (such as gas, electricity and water), and transport. These 'Service Groups' all have their own national and regional democratic structures within UNISON's constitution.

As a trade union, UNISON provides support to members on work related issues, including protection and representation at work, help with pay and conditions of service and legal advice. Each company or organisation will usually be represented by a particular UNISON branch and members within that organisation elect volunteer stewards to represent them. The stewards receive training in workplace issues and are then able to co-ordinate and represent members both on an individual basis and collectively.

Each branch is run by an annually elected committee of members which holds regular meetings, including an annual general meeting for all members to attend. Branches elect delegates to the union's annual National Delegate Conference (held in June every year), the supreme body within the union's constitution with responsibility for setting the union's policies for the forthcoming year.

UNISON own and operate a holiday resort, UNISON Croyde Bay Resort, in North Devon. Members receive a 15% discount as well as have access to a 50% low paid member discount scheme.

To encourage all voices to be heard UNISON has "self organised groups" of Black members, women members, lesbian, gay, bisexual & transgender plus members, and disabled members. Young members and retired members also have their own sections within the union. UNISON also holds conferences for its "self organised groups" which branches elect delegates and visitors to attend.

=== Membership numbers ===
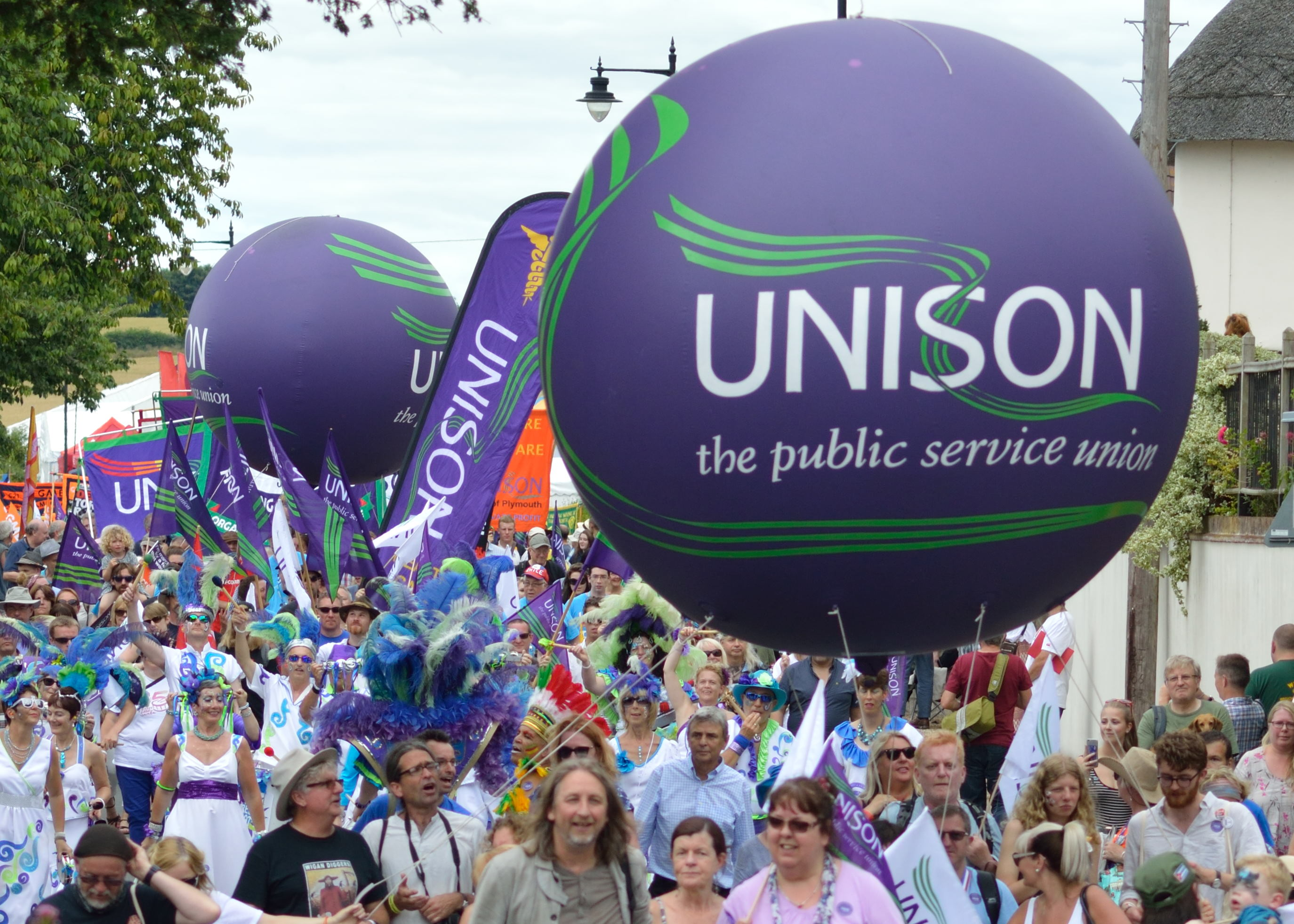
Part of the UNISON contingent at the Tolpuddle Martyrs' Festival and Rally 2016

Membership numbers have remained relatively stable at between 1.2 and 1.4 million over the past 17 years.

Year	Total reported membership
2024	1,269,500
2023	1,235,250
2022	1,210,250
2021	1,229,000
2020	1,278,971
2019	1,254,971
2018	1,249,471
2017	1,245,723
2016	1,239,750
2015	1,254,250
2014	1,270,248
2013	1,282,500
2012	1,301,500
2011	1,317,500
2010	1,374,500
2009	1,374,500
2008	1,362,000
2007	1,344,000
2006	1,343,000
2005	1,317,000
2004	1,310,000
2003	1,301,000

=== Membership fees ===
The levels of subscription are determined by the National Delegate Conference and are recorded as a Schedule in the union rules. The National Delegate Conference has the power to vary the subscriptions levied after a majority vote, although the subscription rates do not change frequently.

Local branches may also, after a majority vote of members, impose an additional 'Local Levy' as long as the levy does not exceed one sixth of the subscription payable. This is in addition to the standard rate, and must be used for local branch purposes.

Membership fees vary depending on how frequently members are paid and the level of their current salary. Subscriptions are generally paid by what is commonly known as "check-off" or DOCAS (Deduction of Contributions at Source). This is where the employer deducts the contribution from the employee's salary on behalf of the union. Payment is taken by Direct Debit if the member joins online, if the member specifically requests it, or if there is no DOCAS arrangement with the employer.

Student members in full-time education (including student nurses or Modern Apprentices) have a fixed rate subscription of £10 per year.

Members who have had continuous membership for at least two years may opt to pay a one-off fee of £15 upon retirement from paid employment. This allows them to retain the benefits of being a union member for life. They are then classed as 'Retired Members'.

Members who are dismissed or made redundant from employment may retain their membership for £4 per year for a period of up to two years whilst they remain unemployed.

=== Membership campaigns ===
Ants and Bear campaign poster

Various local campaigns are run by the union. Much of the recruitment within organisations takes place at a local level, with stewards and branches directly engaging with the staff within their remit.

The national organisation also engages in publicity such as the "Ants and Bear", which was used at the formation of the new amalgamated union. This advertising campaign showed an ant trying to get past a large bear by shouting "Excuse Me", however the bear did not pay attention. The next scene showed the ant being joined by many thousands more, and them all saying "Get out of the way!" together, which does get the bear's attention and makes him move out of the way.

"One in a Million" campaign poster

The General Political Fund funded a TV recruitment advert "You're one in a million", launched in October 2004.

== Political work ==
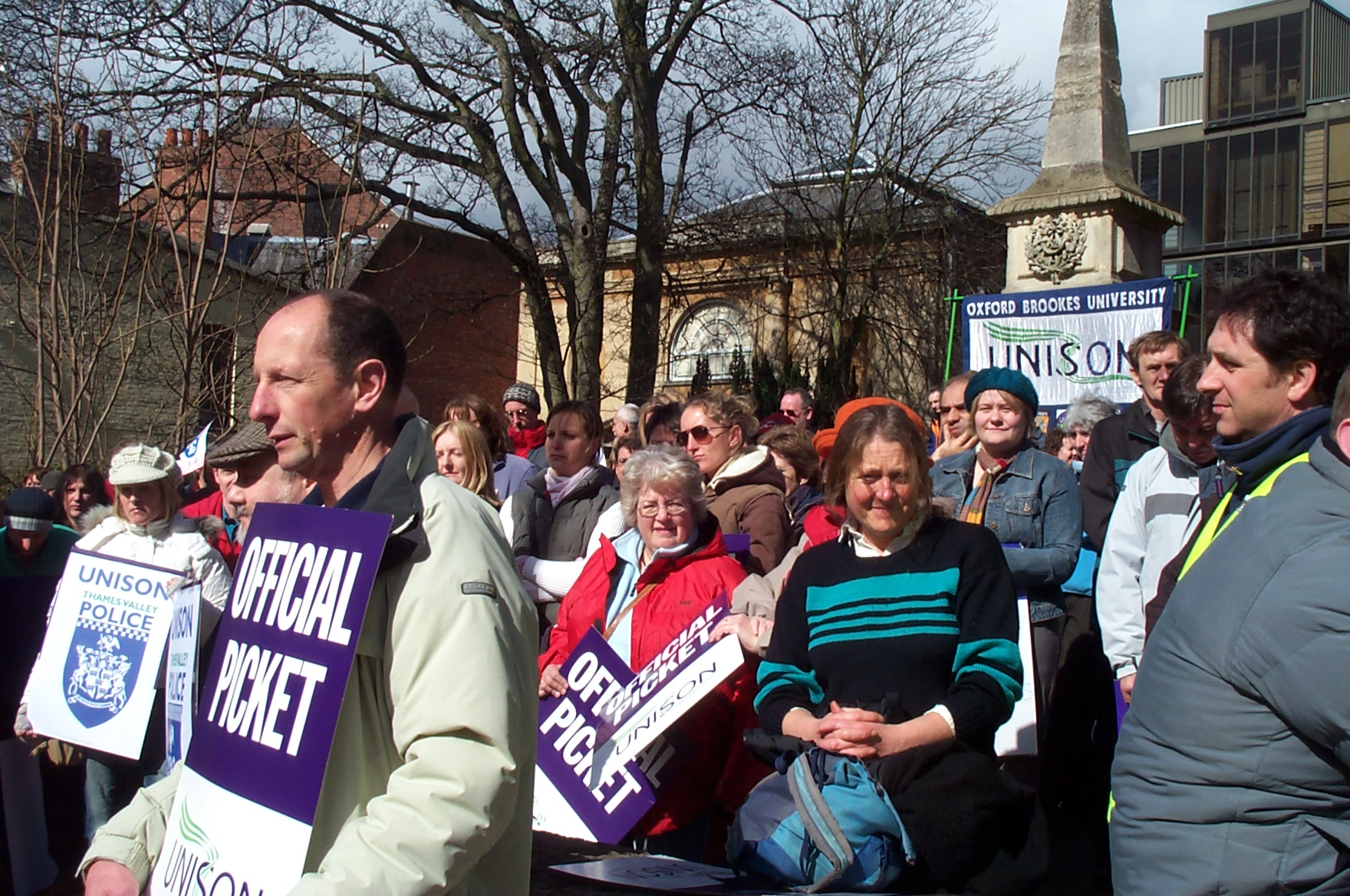
A rally of UNISON in Oxford during the strike on 28 March 2006

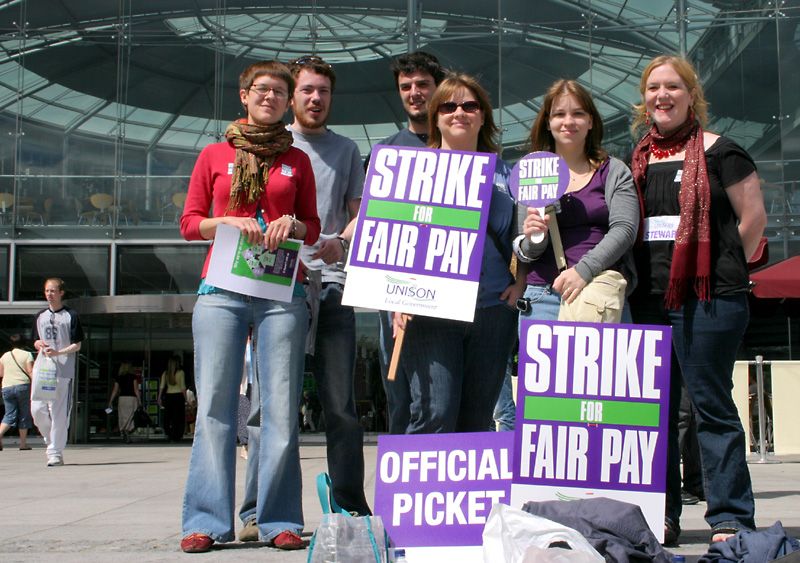
A picket in Norwich in 2008

UNISON has a political fund which uses money from members for political and social campaigning. Members have the choice of paying into either a fund which supports the Labour Party, a non-affiliated General Political Fund or to opt out of contributing to a political fund at all. UNISON also carries out research and campaigns on public service issues, such as the Private Finance Initiative (PFI). It has also voted (at its 2005 annual conference) to oppose the Government's proposals for a British national identity card.

Every UNISON region (except Northern Ireland) has a Labour Link Officer who works with the regional Labour Link committees. They are also the first point of contact for UNISON's involvement in Labour Party activities in each region.

The union's links to Labour and its moderate policies has caused some conflict and criticism of action taken against left-wing activists.

In April 2009, a UNISON conference voted unanimously to request that the British Department of Health ban members of the British National Party from working as nurses in the National Health Service, describing the party as racist.

=== Political campaigns ===
UNISON runs a range of national campaigns, such as 'Positively Public', the campaign to keep public services public and well-funded. Campaigns cover a broad area from pay and pensions to sector-specific initiatives focusing on a variety of issues from cleaner hospitals to opposing the sell-off of public housing.

They are affiliated to the Abortion Rights organisation, which campaigns "to defend and extend women's rights and access to safe, legal abortion".

Unison ran a campaign to "end the two tier workforce", affecting staff employed by government contractors, with a motion carried at its 2004 National Delegate Conference. A two-tier workforce arises when employees are transferred from the public sector (e.g. a local authority or the NHS) to a private sector organisation on protected rates of pay and working conditions whereas new employees are appointed on lower rates of pay and poorer working conditions, leading to two tiers of pay and conditions. The union's strategy was to:

- identify inequalities and the worker groups, contracts, companies and public bodies involved, and publicly expose them;
- use equality tools such as the statutory duty under the Race Relations Act (now the Equality Act 2010) and Section 75 of the Northern Ireland Act 1998 to challenge the continuation of contracts which widen inequality;
- expose ministers, government departments and public bodies to scrutiny, and
- produce guidance for UNISON's bargainers at all levels on how to effectively challenge this form of discrimination.

In July 2015, UNISON endorsed Jeremy Corbyn's campaign in the Labour Party leadership election.

There have also been high-profile regional and local campaigns, such as that against the controversial and unpopular 'SouthWest One' private/public partnership.

The General Political Fund has also funded:

- Anti-racist events
- Local campaigns against privatisation/marketisation
- UNISON presence at various national and regional events
- Campaigns against council housing sell-off

In the run-up to several general or local elections, the fund has been used for advertising campaigns to ensure that issues of importance to UNISON are high on the agenda. Its 2010 campaign was entitled "Million Voices for Public Services".

The GPF is not affiliated to any political party, but the money in the fund is used to support local campaigns and to pay for political advertising.

In February 2013, UNISON was among other organizations and individuals who gave their support to the People's Assembly in a letter published by The Guardian newspaper. UNISON Delegates and representatives attended the People's Assembly Conference held at Westminster Central Hall on 22 June 2013.

In August 2016 UNISON endorsed Jeremy Corbyn once again.

In the 2020 Labour leadership and deputy leadership elections, UNISON endorsed Keir Starmer for leader and Angela Rayner for deputy.

== Internal elections ==
=== 2015 general secretary election ===
Dave Prentis was re-elected in an election with 49.4% of the vote with a 9.8% turnout of members.

=== 2020 general secretary election ===
General Secretary Dave Prentis stood down in December 2020, having held the post since 1 January 2001. Four candidates received enough nominations to be on the ballot: Paul Holmes, Christina McAnea, Roger McKenzie and Hugo Pierre. Peter Sharma and Margaret Greer stood and did not get onto the ballot, Voting for the General Secretary election took place from 18 October to 27 November, with the results announced on 11 January 2021.

Holmes was endorsed by UNISON's left-wing faction "UNISON Action Broad Left" and was employed by Kirklees Council. During the campaign he was suspended from his role and investigated for reasons deemed "serious and confidential" by the council. McAnea was an Assistant General Secretary for UNISON and previously the head of its NHS division. She was considered "closely aligned" to Prentis and his leadership. 458 of 834 branches participated in nominating candidates for the election, higher than the 2015 General Secretary election which saw 373 participate.

Christina McAnea was elected with 47.7% of the total votes cast. Of the 1,278,971 UNISON members at the time of election 134,082 votes were cast, a turnout of 10.5%.

Candidate	Votes	Percentage
Christina McAnea	63,900	47.7%
Paul Holmes	45,220	33.76%
Roger McKenzie	14,450	10.79%
Hugo Pierre	10,382	7,75%

=== 2021–22 national elections ===
On 11 June 2021 the National Executive Committee (NEC) elections took place. A slate represented the left wing of the union 'Time For Real Change' stood and won 40 of the 68 seats. Paul Holmes was selected as union president by the new NEC. In November 2021, the Labour Link Committee was elected. The left-wing 'Time For Real Change' slate won a slim majority on the committee, with 6 of the 11 seats.

In 2022, the 11 Service Executive Committees were elected.

In February 2022, the new union president, Paul Holmes, was dismissed as an employee of Kirklees Council after a disciplinary action of over two years. A campaign alleging he had been the victim of anti-union discrimination began. Details of the council investigation had been leaked to the media in December 2021.

=== 2025 general secretary election ===
For UNISON's 2025 general secretary election two candidates received enough nominations to make it onto the ballot. These were the incumbent Christina McAnea and Andrea Egan, a social worker and UNISON Branch Secretary from Bolton. Egan received the backing of UNISON's left-wing group 'Time for Real Change' as well as UNISON members in the Socialist Party. This would be the first time in UNISON's history that only two candidates would go head-to-head for the position.

The election took place after the success of the Labour Party in the 2024 United Kingdom general election. The union's relationship with Labour was a major aspect of the contest as UNISON was the second biggest donor to Labour during the election period with donations totalling over £1.4 million. Of the 11 trade unions affiliated to Labour, UNISON had also traditionally been regarded as a reliable ally of the party. McAnea was seen as close to Labour and their leader Keir Starmer albeit showing frustration with their record in government while Egan went much further in her attacks on Labour's record given the amount of donations UNISON had paid to them.

Voting opened on 28 October 2025 and closed on 25 November 2025 with results announced on 17 December 2025.

Andrea Egan was elected with 59.82% of the total votes cast and became the first lay member of UNISON to be elected to the position. Egan began her five-year term as general secretary on January 22 2026.

Candidate	Votes	Percentage
Andrea Egan	58,579	59.82%
Christina McAnea	39,353	40.18%

== Leadership ==
=== General secretaries ===
- 1993: Alan Jinkinson
- 1996: Rodney Bickerstaffe
- 2001: Dave Prentis
- 2021: Christina McAnea
- 2026: Andrea Egan

=== Deputy general secretaries ===
1993: Colm O'Kane, Dave Prentis and Tom Sawyer
1994: Dave Prentis
2001: Keith Sonnet
2012: Post vacant

=== Presidents ===
1993: Micky Bryant, Brenda Hudson and Colin Robinson
1994:
1995: Pat Ingram
1996: Wendy Evans
1997: John McFadden
1998: Alison Shepherd
1999: Anne Picking
2000: Adrian Dilworth
2001: Veronica Dunn
2002: Nancy Coull
2003: Dave Anderson
2004: Pauline Thorne
2005: Christine Wilde
2006: Malcolm Cantello
2007: Norma Stephenson
2008: Sue Highton
2009: Gerry Gallagher
2010: Angela Lynes
2011: Eleanor Smith
2012: Chris Tansley
2013: Maureen Le Marinel
2014: Lucia McKeever
2015: Wendy Nichols
2016: Eric Roberts
2017: Margaret McKee
2018: Gordon McKay
2019: Josie Bird
2021: Paul Holmes
2022: Andrea Egan
2023: Libby Nolan
2024: Steve North
2025: Catherine McKenna
2026: James Anthony

== See also ==
- UIA Mutual
