= MIP =

MIP may refer to:

== Science ==
- Mars ISPP Precursor, a test payload intended to be flown on the cancelled Mars Surveyor 2001 Lander
- Maximum intensity projection, a computer visualization method
- Mercury intrusion porosimetry, an analytical technique to determine a material's porous structure
- MIP, an interactive proof system complexity class; see Interactive proof system
- Minimum ionizing particle, in particle physics
- Mixed integer programming, linear programming where some variables are constrained to be integers
- Model intercomparison project; see Coupled model intercomparison project
- Molecularly imprinted polymer, polymers processed using the molecular imprinting technique with affinity to a chosen 'template molecule'
- Moon impact probe, of the Indian lunar satellite Chandrayaan-1
- Mare Ingenii Pit, a lunar pit cave

=== Biology ===
- Macrophage inflammatory protein, in biology
- Maximum inspiratory pressure, the maximum inspiratory pressure is the highest atmospheric pressure developed during inspiration against an occluded airway
- Methylation induced premeiotically
- Microprotein, a small protein encoded from small open reading frames
- Mid-inguinal point
- MIP (gene), a gene in humans
- Mitochondrial intermediate peptidase, an enzyme
- Molecular Inversion Probe

== Arts and entertainment ==
- Mipcom, a TV and entertainment market
- museum in progress, a non-commercial art association, based in Vienna
- Most Improved Player (disambiguation)

== Business ==
- Mortgage insurance premium
- Managers in Partnership (MIP), a British trade union for healthcare managers
- Managing Intellectual Property, a monthly magazine specialized in intellectual property law and business
- Master in Ingegneria della Produzione (MIP), Politecnico di Milano School of Management
- Mint in Package; a collectors' abbreviation; see Mint condition

== Government and politics ==
- Macroeconomic Imbalance Procedure, a European Union economic governance procedure
- Midwest Innocence Project, an American legal non-profit organization
- Minor in Possession, in U.S. law, obtaining alcohol while under age
- Multilateral Interoperability Programme, a consortium of 29 NATO and Non-NATO nations
- Popular Independent Movement (Mouvement indépendant populaire), a Luxembourgian political party in the 1960s

== Technology ==
- Male Iron Pipe, a plumbing pipe connection to an FIP (Female Iron Pipe); see National Pipe Thread
- Mega-frame Initialization Packet, an MPEG-2 Transport Stream packet used for synchronization in DVB-T single-frequency networks
- Memory in Pixel, a type of liquid crystal display that uses static random-access memory (SRAM) to hold a pixel state without memory refresh (unlike DRAM)
- Mipmap (multum in parvo, much in little space), a sequences of images, each of which is a progressively lower resolution than the previous
- Mobile IP, an IP protocol extension to provide mobility in the Internet

== See also ==
- MIPS (disambiguation)
