= Kemi Badenoch =

British politician (born 1980)

The Right Honourable Kemi Badenoch MP
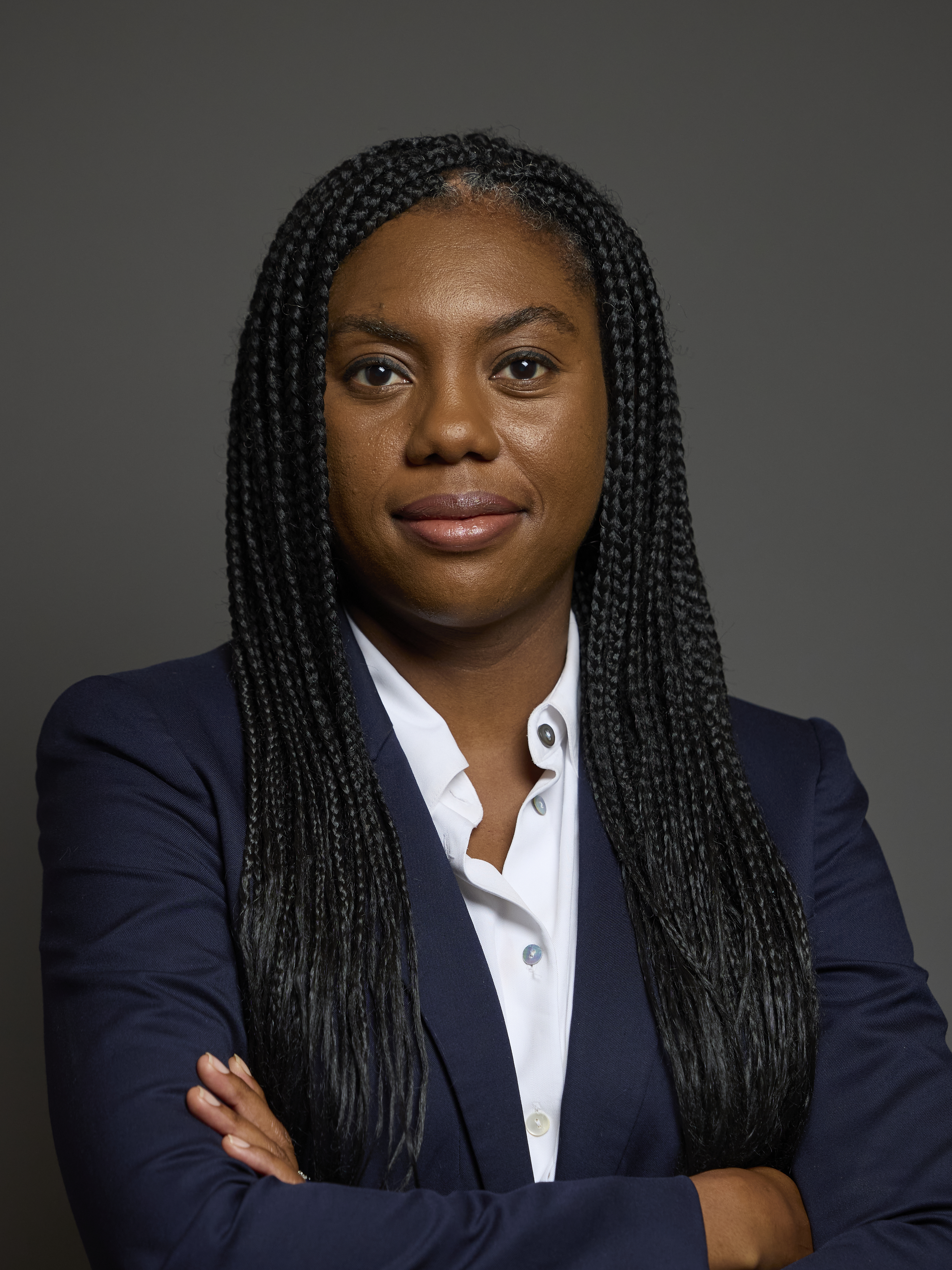
- Official portrait, 2024

Leader of the Opposition
- Incumbent
- Assumed office 2 November 2024
- Monarch: Charles III
- Prime Minister: Keir Starmer; Andy Burnham
- Deputy: Alex Burghart (Note: Office vacant between 2 November 2024 and 31 August 2026)
- Preceded by: Rishi Sunak

Leader of the Conservative Party
- Incumbent
- Assumed office 2 November 2024
- Deputy: Alex Burghart (Note: Appointed on 31 August 2026)
- Preceded by: Rishi Sunak
Ministerial positions
Secretary of State for Business and Trade
In office 7 February 2023 – 5 July 2024
| Prime Minister | Rishi Sunak |
| Preceded by | Grant Shapps (Note: As Secretary of State for Business, Energy and Industrial Strategy.); Herself (Note: As Secretary of State for International Trade.) |
| Succeeded by | Jonathan Reynolds |
President of the Board of Trade
In office 6 September 2022 – 5 July 2024
| Prime Minister | Liz Truss; Rishi Sunak |
| Preceded by | Anne-Marie Trevelyan |
| Succeeded by | Jonathan Reynolds |
Minister for Women and Equalities
In office 26 October 2022 – 5 July 2024
| Prime Minister | Rishi Sunak |
| Preceded by | Nadhim Zahawi (Note: As Minister for Equalities.) |
| Succeeded by | Bridget Phillipson |
Secretary of State for International Trade
In office 6 September 2022 – 7 February 2023
| Prime Minister | Liz Truss; Rishi Sunak |
| Preceded by | Anne-Marie Trevelyan |
| Succeeded by | Office abolished |
Junior ministerial offices
Minister of State for Local Government, Faith and Communities
In office 16 September 2021 – 6 July 2022
| Prime Minister | Boris Johnson |
| Preceded by | Luke Hall |
| Succeeded by | Paul Scully |
Minister of State for Equalities (Note: As Parliamentary Under-Secretary of State from 2020 to September 2021.)
In office 14 February 2020 – 6 July 2022
| Prime Minister | Boris Johnson |
| Preceded by | The Baroness Williams of Trafford |
| Succeeded by | Amanda Solloway |
Exchequer Secretary to the Treasury
In office 13 February 2020 – 16 September 2021
| Prime Minister | Boris Johnson |
| Preceded by | Simon Clarke |
| Succeeded by | Helen Whately |
Parliamentary Under-Secretary of State for Children and Families
In office 27 July 2019 – 13 February 2020 (Note: Michelle Donelan was appointed on 4 September 2019 as an additional Parliamentary Under-Secretary of State for Children and Families to cover the portfolio during Badenoch's maternity leave.)
| Prime Minister | Boris Johnson |
| Preceded by | Nadhim Zahawi |
| Succeeded by | Vicky Ford |
Shadow Cabinet posts
Shadow Secretary of State for Housing, Communities and Local Government
In office 8 July 2024 – 2 November 2024
| Leader | Rishi Sunak |
| Preceded by | Angela Rayner |
| Succeeded by | Kevin Hollinrake |

Member of Parliament for North West Essex Saffron Walden (2017–2024)
- Incumbent
- Assumed office 8 June 2017
- Preceded by: Alan Haselhurst
- Majority: 2,610 (4.8%)

Member of the London Assembly as an additional member
- In office 16 September 2015 – 8 June 2017
- Preceded by: Victoria Borwick
- Succeeded by: Susan Hall
- Constituency: 9th additional member (2015–2016); 4th additional member (2016–2017)

Personal details
- Born: Olukemi Olufunto Adegoke; 2 January 1980 (age 46) Wimbledon, London, England
- Party: Conservative
- Spouse: Hamish Badenoch (m. 2012)
- Children: 3
- Relatives: Yemi Osinbajo (first cousin once removed)
- Education: University of Sussex (MEng); Birkbeck, University of London (LLB)
- Occupation: Politician; consultant; software engineer
- Website: kemibadenoch.org.uk
- Kemi Badenoch's voice Badenoch and Yaron Brook debate Leo Panitch on socialism versus capitalism. Recorded 28 May 2018

Kemi Badenoch (Note: /ˈkɛmi ˈbeɪdənɒk/ KEM-ee BAY-də-nok; her surname comes from the Scottish district of Badenoch, which is pronounced /ˈbædənɒx/ BAD-ə-nokh.) (née Olukemi Olufunto Adegoke; born 2 January 1980) is a British politician who has served as Leader of the Opposition and Leader of the Conservative Party since 2024. Badenoch previously worked in the Cabinet for prime ministers Liz Truss and Rishi Sunak from 2022 to 2024. She has also served as Member of Parliament (MP) for North West Essex, previously Saffron Walden, since 2017.

Born in London to Nigerian parents, her family moved to Nigeria shortly after her birth. She returned to the United Kingdom at the age of 16 and later studied at the University of Sussex and Birkbeck, University of London. She went on to work for the Royal Bank of Scotland Group, Coutts, and The Spectator. In 2005, she joined the Conservative Party and in 2012, Badenoch unsuccessfully contested a seat in the London Assembly, but became a member of the London Assembly after Victoria Borwick was elected as an MP in 2015. A supporter of Brexit in the 2016 referendum, Badenoch was elected to the House of Commons at the 2017 general election.

After Boris Johnson became prime minister in July 2019, Badenoch was appointed Parliamentary Under-Secretary of State for Children and Families. In the February 2020 reshuffle she was appointed Exchequer Secretary to the Treasury and Parliamentary Under-Secretary of State for Equalities. In September 2021, she was promoted to Minister of State for Equalities and appointed Minister of State for Local Government, Faith and Communities.

In July 2022, Badenoch resigned from government in protest at Johnson's leadership; she stood unsuccessfully to replace him in the July–September 2022 party leadership election. After Liz Truss was appointed prime minister in September 2022, Badenoch was appointed Secretary of State for International Trade and President of the Board of Trade and was appointed to the Privy Council; she was reappointed Trade Secretary by Truss's successor, Rishi Sunak, the following month, also becoming Minister for Women and Equalities.

In the February 2023 Cabinet reshuffle, Badenoch assumed the position of Secretary of State for Business and Trade following the merging of the Department for International Trade with elements of the Department for Business, Energy and Industrial Strategy. Badenoch retained the responsibilities of Women and Equalities Minister. Following the Conservatives' defeat in the 2024 general election, Badenoch was appointed Shadow Secretary of State for Housing, Communities and Local Government in Sunak's Shadow Cabinet and later launched her bid to become leader of the Conservative Party in the 2024 leadership election. She defeated Robert Jenrick in the members' ballot, becoming party leader and Leader of the Opposition.

== Early life and education ==
Olukemi Olufunto Adegoke was born on 2 January 1980 in Wimbledon, London. Her mother Feyi Adubifa travelled from Nigeria to the United Kingdom and gave birth in St Teresa's Maternity Hospital. This was before the British Nationality Act 1981 abolished automatic birthright citizenship for those born in the UK; Kemi was therefore born a British citizen, and Feyi then returned to Nigeria shortly after Olukemi was born. In interviews, Badenoch denied claims she was an "anchor baby" and asserted that her family did not know she was eligible for a British passport until she was a teenager.

Her father, Femi Adegoke, was a general practitioner who later founded a publishing company in Nigeria and became an activist for the rights of the Yoruba people. Her mother Feyi was a professor of physiology at the University of Lagos. Adegoke has a brother and a sister. According to a profile in The Times, Badenoch is the first cousin once removed of former Nigerian Vice-President Yemi Osinbajo.

Badenoch spent her childhood living in Lagos, Nigeria, and in the United States, where her mother lectured. Badenoch has spoken about having a "very tough upbringing" in Nigeria. Her family lived in the middle class neighbourhood of Surulere and she was a student at the private International School of Lagos. Badenoch has described her background as "middle-class" but said in 2018 "Being middle class in Nigeria still meant having no running water or electricity, sometimes taking your own chair to school" and claimed that her family went through "periods of poverty" due to inflation. She returned to the UK at the age of 16 to live with a friend of her mother's owing to the deteriorating political and economic situation in Nigeria, which had affected her family. During her parliamentary maiden speech Badenoch stated that she was "to all intents and purposes a first-generation immigrant".

Badenoch has claimed in several interviews to have been offered a partial scholarship to Stanford University when she was 16 to study pre-medicine on the basis of her high grades, but to have been unable to attend because the scholarship offered was not enough to cover costs. However, Stanford did not offer a pre-med course, and the Stanford admissions officer at that time responsible for the allocation of bursaries to international students subsequently denied this happened. Badenoch studied A-Levels in biology, chemistry and maths, at Phoenix College, a sixth form college in Morden, south London. She achieved a B in biology, a B in chemistry and a D in maths, claiming that "no one at the school had pushed [her] to fulfil [her] potential" despite being a "straight A student" while in Nigeria and that being let down by "the soft bigotry of low expectations" pushed her to become a conservative. She did not achieve the grades required to take up an offer from Warwick University. Concurrently, she worked at a branch of McDonald's, among other jobs, including New Look. During this time, she said she "became working class". Badenoch studied Computer Systems Engineering at the University of Sussex, completing a Master of Engineering (MEng) degree in 2003. She studied law at Birkbeck, University of London, graduating with a Bachelor of Laws (LLB) degree in 2009, and becoming a Fellow of Birkbeck in 2018.

== Early career ==
Badenoch initially worked within the information technology sector, first as a software engineer at Logica (later CGI Inc) from 2003 to 2006. While working there she read Law part-time at Birkbeck, University of London, graduating as Bachelor of Laws (LLB) in 2009. Badenoch then worked as a systems analyst at the Royal Bank of Scotland Group, before pursuing a career in consultancy and financial services, working as an associate director at private bank and wealth manager Coutts from 2006 to 2013 and later a digital director for The Spectator from 2015 to 2016.

== Political career ==
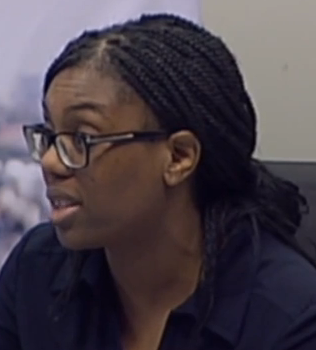
Badenoch in 2017 speaking at the London Assembly's Energy Committee

Badenoch joined the Conservative Party in 2005 at the age of 25. At the 2010 general election, she contested the Dulwich and West Norwood constituency and came third, behind the Labour Party incumbent MP Tessa Jowell and the Liberal Democrat candidate Jonathan Mitchell.

In January 2026, Badenoch said she initially joined the Conservative Party for the "party aspect of it - socialising, drinks, hanging out with other young people".

=== London Assembly ===
In 2012, Badenoch stood for the Conservatives in the London Assembly election, where she was placed fifth on the London-wide list; Badenoch was not elected as Conservatives won only three seats.

Three years later, in the 2015 general election, Victoria Borwick was elected to the House of Commons and resigned her seat on the London Assembly. The fourth-placed candidate on the list, Suella Braverman, was also elected as an MP, so Badenoch became the new Assembly Member. She went on to retain her seat in the Assembly at the 2016 election, being succeeded in 2017 by fellow Conservative Susan Hall.

Badenoch supported Brexit in the 2016 UK EU membership referendum.

In 2018, Badenoch admitted that, a decade earlier, as a prank, she had hacked into the website of Deputy Leader of the Labour Party Harriet Harman; Harman accepted Badenoch's apology, but the matter was reported to Action Fraud, the UK's cyber crime reporting centre.

== Parliamentary career ==
Badenoch was shortlisted to be the Conservative Party candidate for the marginal Hampstead and Kilburn constituency at the 2017 general election, but was unsuccessful. She was subsequently selected for the same election as the Conservative candidate for Saffron Walden, a safe seat for her party, which she won with 37,629 votes and a majority of 24,966 (41.0%).

=== Early tenure ===
In her maiden speech as an MP on 19 July 2017, she described the vote for Brexit as "the greatest ever vote of confidence in the project of the United Kingdom" and cited her personal heroes as the Conservative politicians Winston Churchill, Airey Neave, and Margaret Thatcher.

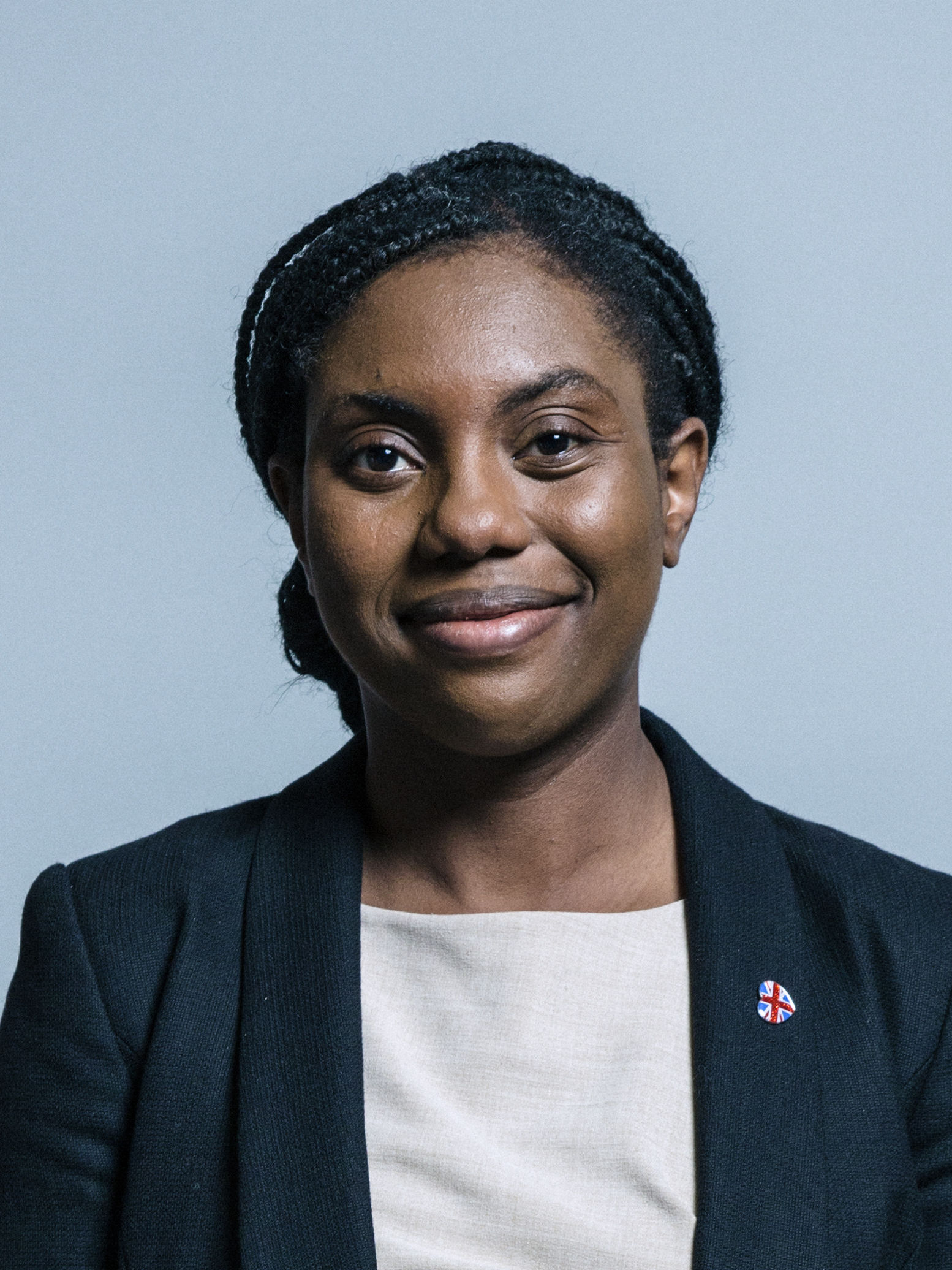
Badenoch's first official portrait as an MP

In the same month, Badenoch was selected to join the 1922 Executive Committee. In September, she was appointed to the parliamentary Justice Select Committee. She was appointed as the Conservative Party's Vice Chair for Candidates in January 2018.

She voted for Theresa May's Brexit withdrawal agreement in early 2019. In the indicative votes on 27 March, she voted against a referendum on a withdrawal agreement and against a customs union with the EU. In October, Badenoch voted for Johnson's withdrawal agreement.

In January 2019, Badenoch was criticised by a number of Labour MPs for suggesting that Tulip Siddiq was "making a point" by delaying her scheduled caesarean section in order to attend a House of Commons vote on Brexit.

In the run-up to the 2019 Conservative Party leadership election, Badenoch was tipped as a possible contender just two years into her tenure in parliament. She instead supported the campaign of Michael Gove. In the December 2019 general election, she was re-elected with an increased majority of 27,594 (43.7%) votes.

=== Johnson government ===
In July 2019, Badenoch was appointed as Parliamentary Under-Secretary of State for Children and Families by Boris Johnson. In February 2020, Badenoch was appointed Exchequer Secretary to the Treasury and Parliamentary Under-Secretary of State (Minister for Equalities) in the Department for International Trade.

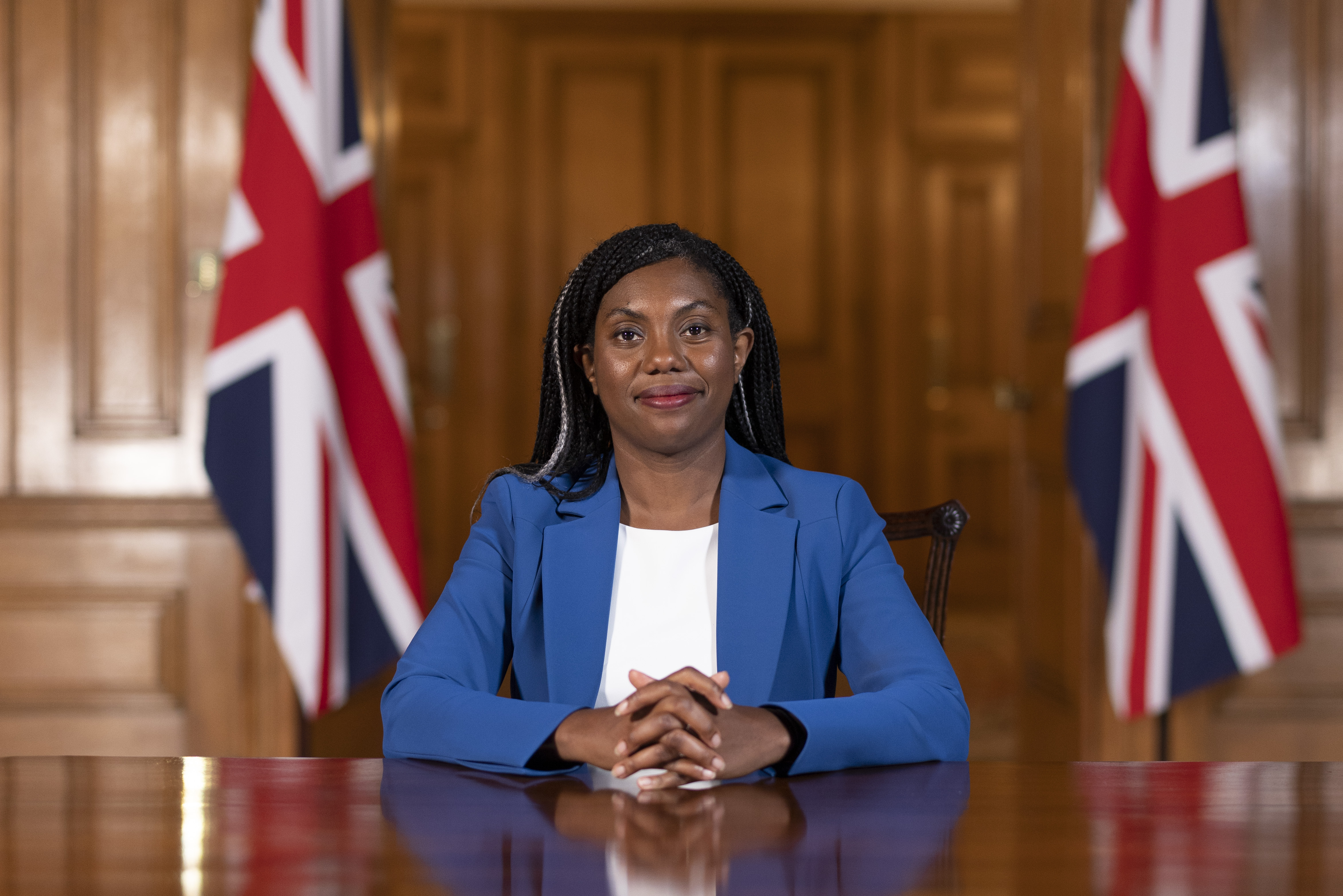
Badenoch's 2022 official portrait

Badenoch published a series of tweets in January 2021 in which she included screenshots of questions sent to her office by HuffPost journalist Nadine White whom she, as a result, accused of "creepy and bizarre behaviour". White subsequently made her Twitter account private, citing the abuse she received. Badenoch's actions were criticised by both the National Union of Journalists and the Council of Europe's Safety of Journalists Platform. She was defended by the Prime Minister's press secretary who commented that it was all a "misunderstanding".

In a Cabinet reshuffle in September 2021, Badenoch was promoted to Minister of State for Equalities and appointed Minister of State for Housing, Communities and Local Government. Within days of her appointments, the latter title was renamed "Minister of State for Levelling Up Communities". On 6 July 2022, Badenoch resigned from the government, citing Johnson's handling of the Chris Pincher scandal, in a joint statement with fellow ministers Alex Burghart, Neil O'Brien, Lee Rowley and Julia Lopez.

=== 2022 leadership candidacy ===
Badenoch's leadership bid logo

Following Johnson's resignation, Badenoch launched a bid to succeed him as Conservative Party leader, stating that she wanted to "tell the truth" and that she advocated "strong but limited government". As a candidate, she called the target of net zero carbon emissions "ill-thought through" and said that politicians had become "hooked on the idea of the state fixing the majority of problems".

According to The Sunday Times, Badenoch entered the race as "a relatively unknown minister for local government" but "within a week emerged as the insurgent candidate to become Britain's next prime minister". She was eliminated in the fourth round of voting and did not endorse another candidate.

=== Truss government ===
Badenoch as part of Prime Minister Liz Truss's cabinet in October 2022

In September 2022, after Liz Truss became prime minister, she appointed Badenoch to her Cabinet as Secretary of State for International Trade. Following Truss's resignation the following month, Badenoch endorsed Rishi Sunak in the leadership election, stating that he was "the serious, honest leader we need".

=== Sunak government ===
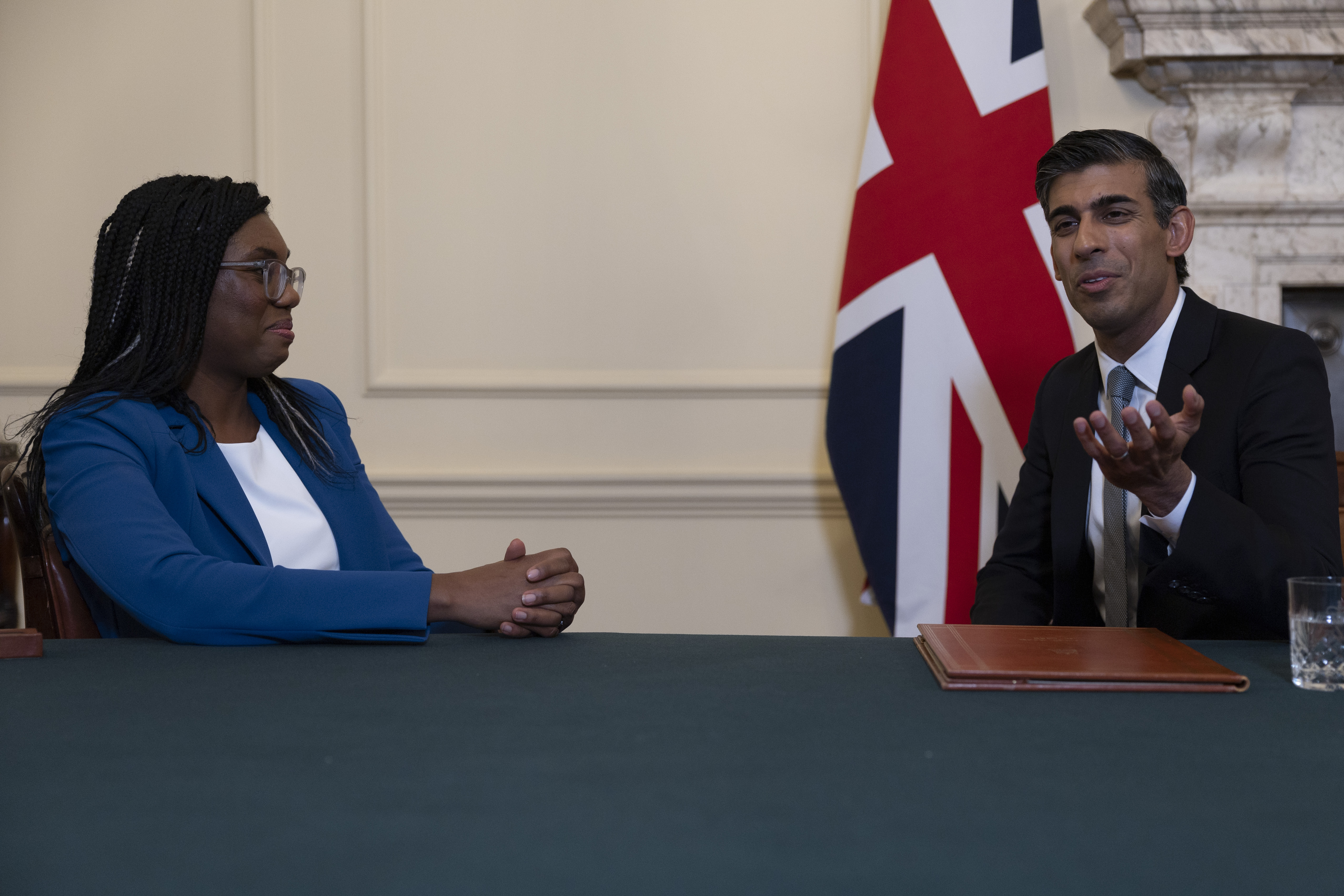
Badenoch with Prime Minister Rishi Sunak, 25 October 2022

On 25 October 2022, Badenoch was retained as Secretary of State for International Trade by Rishi Sunak upon him becoming prime minister. She was also granted the additional role of Minister for Women & Equalities.

In a February 2023 Cabinet reshuffle, Badenoch was appointed as the first Secretary of State at the newly created Department for Business and Trade, with continued responsibility for equalities. The new role was effectively an expansion of her portfolio as International Trade Secretary to include the business and investment responsibilities of the newly dissolved Department for Business, Energy and Industrial Strategy.

In 2022, Badenoch, as Equalities Minister, approved the appointment of Joanne Cash as a Commissioner to the Equality and Human Rights Commission (EHRC) board. Badenoch said that Cash had "a track record of promoting women's rights and freedom of expression". Subsequently, in the summer of 2022, Cash donated to Badenoch's campaign as a candidate for leadership of the Conservative Party. In 2023, after the appointment was completed, Anneliese Dodds, shadow equalities minister, said the government was engulfed in "sleaze and cronyism" and Badenoch should "come clean" about why she had not declared a political interest in the appointment. When it reported the story, The Guardian said Badenoch had not broken any rules and quoted an Equality Hub spokesperson saying the "appointment was made following a full and open competition".

Badenoch as part of Prime Minister Rishi Sunak's cabinet in December 2022

In late April 2023, Badenoch announced that the government was planning to reduce the number of laws to be repealed to around 800, as opposed to the government's original target of around 4,000 laws. The change was met with dismay by Brexit advocates, including the Bill's original architect Jacob Rees-Mogg. Nevertheless, The New Statesman named her as the seventh most powerful British right-wing figure in 2023, describing her as the "darling" of many party members, in spite of "cooling enthusiasm".

On 16 July 2023, Badenoch signed an agreement for the UK to join the Comprehensive and Progressive Agreement for Trans-Pacific Partnership, which on ratification would give British exporters preferential access to a market of 500 million consumers in the Asia Pacific region, who accounted for approximately 13% of global GDP. Although the UK government forecasted that membership of the trading bloc would only increase the size of the economy by 0.08% over 10 years.

In December 2023, Badenoch decided to refuse an application, which was said to have been approved by the British Phonographic Industry, for Music Export Growth Scheme (MEGS) funding from Belfast based rappers Kneecap. BBC News reported that a government spokesperson said it was "hardly surprising" that they did not want to hand out UK taxpayers' money to those opposed to the United Kingdom. The rap group claimed that the actual reason for the refusal was that a poster for their 2019 'Farewell to the Union' tour, which depicted Boris Johnson tied to a large firework rocket, had angered the Conservative Party. On 29 November 2024, the Belfast High Court ruled that the British government had acted illegally by withholding the £14,250 in funding on the sole basis of the band's political views, with the UK's Department for Business and Trade agreeing that the original decision by Badenoch had been "unlawful and procedurally unfair". In a statement, Kneecap accused the former Conservative government of committing "a fascist type action, an attempt to block art that does not agree with their views".

Under Badenoch's direction, negotiations for the Canada–United Kingdom Trade Continuity Agreement was paused in January 2024 after the British government resisted Canadian demands to lift the ban on hormone treated beef being sold to UK consumers. The ending of talks resulted in a worse trade agreement with Canada than when the UK was still an EU member, such as a 245% tariff on British cheese exports.

On 1 May 2024 Badenoch's office used a letter sent by Conservative MP Eddie Hughes to Walsall Academy as evidence to support Badenoch's claim that girls at a school who did not want to use gender-neutral toilets developed urinary tract infections. Hughes had claimed in May 2023 in a letter to Walsall Academy that "one female pupil has developed a UTI" as she did not feel comfortable using gender-neutral toilets.

=== Early opposition and 2024 leadership bid ===
Logo for Badenoch's 2024 leadership campaign

Due to the 2023 review of Westminster constituencies, Badenoch's constituency of Saffron Walden was abolished, and replaced with North West Essex. At the 2024 general election, Badenoch was elected to Parliament as MP for North West Essex with 35.6% of the vote and a majority of 2,610. Following the Conservative defeat at the general election, she was appointed Shadow Secretary of State for Housing, Communities and Local Government. She publicly criticised Rishi Sunak and Suella Braverman.

In July 2024, The Guardian reported that at least three officials working under Badenoch had experienced bullying in the Department for Business and Trade and that she had created an intimidating atmosphere while she was in charge. According to this report, the officials felt "pushed out" by "bullying and traumatising" behaviour and claimed that individuals were regularly humiliated and occasionally left in tears after working with her. An official "town hall" meeting had been held in December 2023 to address low morale in the department. Badenoch denied these claims, describing them as smears from former staff and accusing them of "covering up their own failures and general gross incompetence", and accused The Guardian of acting on behalf of the Labour Party. A department spokesperson confirmed that there were no formal complaints or investigations into Badenoch's alleged behaviour.

On 28 July 2024, she announced she was running in the election to be the new Tory leader. Badenoch's campaign was chaired by former Planning Minister Rachel Maclean. In the days leading up to the announcement, Badenoch released a statement criticising the "dirty tricks" of rival candidates, after The Spectator published an article quoting unflattering comments posted by a user named "Kemi" from several years previously on the Naijablog website.

Despite being considered the frontrunner at the beginning of the contest, In the first and second MP ballots, Badenoch came second to Robert Jenrick, with 22 and 28 votes respectively. However, according to both YouGov's poll and ConservativeHome's survey of the Conservative Party membership, Badenoch still led every other candidate in a head to head race in a membership vote.

Speaking at the 2024 Conservative Party Conference, Badenoch joked that up to 10% of civil servants are so bad they should be in prison, suggesting they leak official secrets and "agitate" against ministers, "There's about 5–10% of them who are very, very bad. You know, should-be-in-prison bad", Badenoch said.

The general secretary of the FDA union of civil servants, Dave Penman, called on Badenoch to withdraw the comments. "These are serious accusations from a former secretary of state, who is now standing to be leader of her party. If she has evidence to back up those claims she should publish it, otherwise withdraw."

Badenoch came third in the third MP's ballot, with 30 votes, but topped the final vote of MPs with 42, one ahead of Robert Jenrick and five clear of James Cleverly who was eliminated. In the members' vote, Badenoch faced Jenrick, who she defeated with 56.5% of the vote. She was then declared the winner of the race, and thus Leader of the Conservative Party.

== Leadership of the Conservative Party (since 2024) ==
Badenoch's acceptance speech after being elected as leader of the Conservative Party and becoming leader of the opposition in 2024

In her acceptance speech, Badenoch vowed to "renew" the Conservative Party, setting out her belief that the Conservatives had two responsibilities: to "hold this Labour Government to account" and to "prepare over the course of the next few years for government". She became the first black leader of any major UK political party and the fourth woman to lead the Conservative Party, after Margaret Thatcher, Theresa May and Liz Truss.

Badenoch appointed Rebecca Harris as Chief Whip of the Conservative Party in her first appointment to her Shadow Cabinet on 4 November 2024, as she began forming her opposition frontbench. On 15 January 2025, Badenoch's spokesperson confirmed she will not conduct a Shadow Cabinet reshuffle before the next general election.

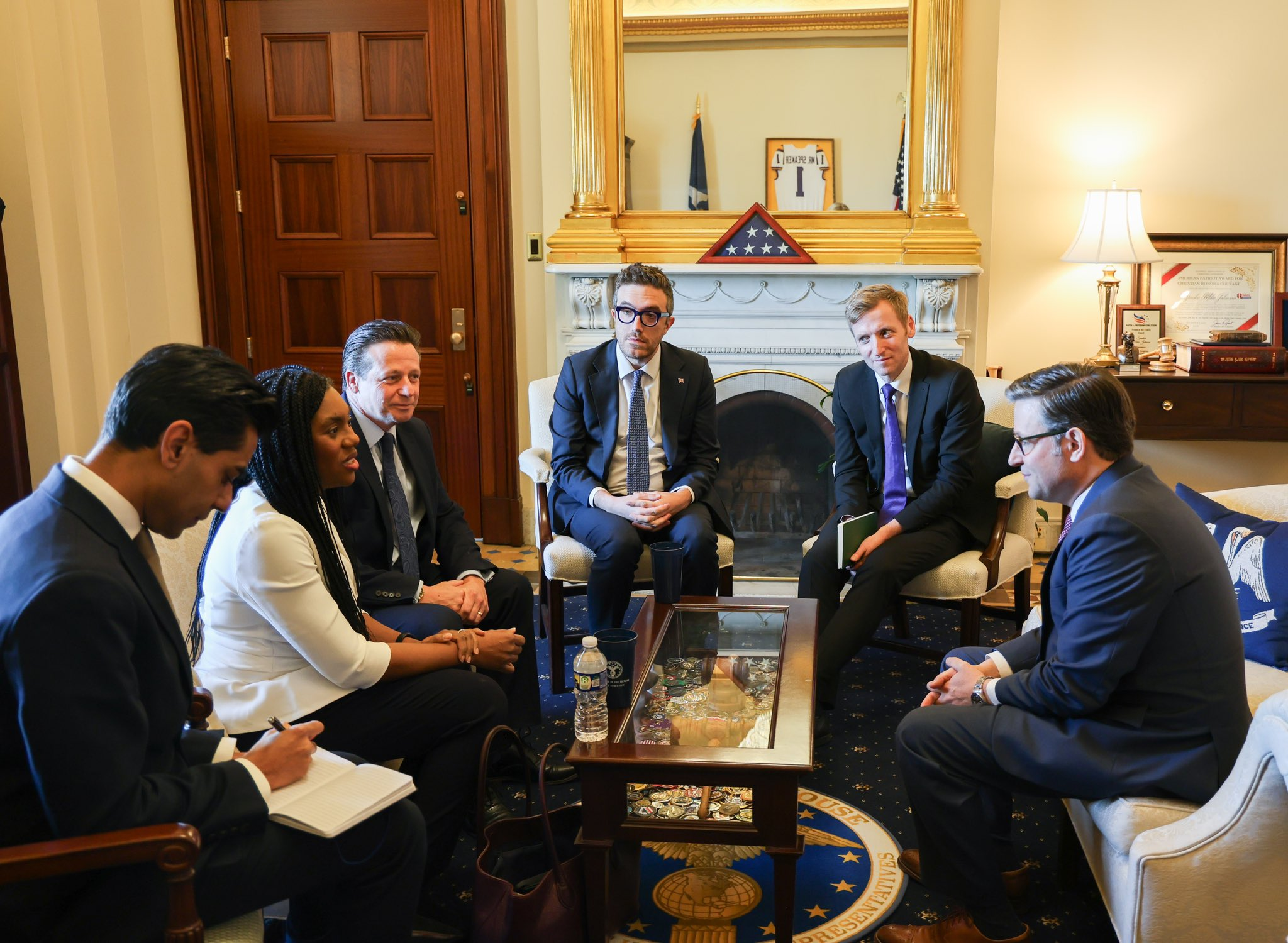
Badenoch with Mike Johnson in December 2024

In December 2024, Kemi Badenoch was included in the BBC 100 Women 2024 list.

In a 23 December 2024 interview with BBC Radio 4's Today programme, Badenoch said the public "kicked out" the Conservative Party because it was not trusted and did not deliver; she dismissed concerns that her approach of not having specific policy positions would leave a vacuum that could be filled by Reform UK; and she acknowledged the forthcoming 2025 United Kingdom local elections would be difficult for her party.

In a January 2025 speech, Badenoch criticised past actions of the Conservative Party regarding issues such as delivering Brexit and lowering immigration, admitting that they had told the public "what they wanted to hear first and then tried to work it out later."

In May 2025, on the occasion of a negotiation of a new deal with the European Union by Keir Starmer's government, Kemi Badenoch declared "There is a big difference between an 18 year old from France who's coming for their gap year and a 30 year old with several children who's coming from a much poorer EU country like Bulgaria or Romania."

On 22 July 2025, Badenoch reshuffled her shadow cabinet in effort to improve party unity and its credibility. Prior in January, she stated that she would not reshuffle the shadow cabinet.

In September 2026, Badenoch "registered gifts worth £8,177 covering travel and accommodation for a meeting with media mogul Rupert Murdoch in Greece" and met with senior News Corp and News UK executives. Badenoch had previously met with Murdoch and News Corp executives in 2022, as an international trade minister. Shortly prior to the 2026 meeting, Badenoch met with Italian Prime Minister Giorgia Meloni.

=== Northern Ireland ===
In November 2024, Badenoch faced criticism from Eurosceptic MPs, such as Nigel Farage, when she whipped Conservative MPs into abstaining on a vote to introduce passports for household pets travelling between the Great Britain and Northern Ireland. As well as a perceived undermining of the Union, critics said that an effective Opposition would oppose the scheme rather than wave it through Parliament.

In early October 2025, when challenged during an interview with BBC Northern Ireland that the Tory government she was a part of had undermined the Union with mainland Britain by enforcing an Irish Sea border as part of the Brexit negotiations, Badenoch retorted that "the last time I checked, Northern Ireland did vote to leave", despite the fact that N.I. voted to remain in the European Union by a majority of 56% to 44% during the 2016 EU Referendum. Foyle MP Colum Eastwood later criticized her comments and claimed it demonstrated how mainland UK politicians did not take important Irish issues seriously.

In late October 2025, after a former member of the Parachute Regiment known as "Soldier F" was found not guilty of two murders and five attempted murders during a 1972 civil rights march, Badenoch said she was pleased by the verdict, despite the fact that "Soldier F" had previously admitted shooting at least four unarmed civilians on the day in question. In May 2026, Badenoch was forced to apologise after a Tory party political video featuring British soldiers storming the Bogside on Bloody Sunday was released to her Twitter account. The video, which was made to voice opposition to reforms of the 2023 Legacy and Reconciliation Act, was later branded “disgusting and disgraceful" by Colum Eastwood.

=== Calls for a public inquiry into the grooming gangs scandal ===
In October 2024, Jess Phillips, the Parliamentary Under-Secretary of State for Safeguarding and Violence Against Women and Girls, rejected Oldham Council's request for an independent public inquiry into the Oldham child sexual exploitation scandal, favouring a locally-run inquiry instead. On 2 January 2025, Badenoch called for a "long overdue" national public inquiry into the UK's rape gangs, criticising the government for not supporting a government-led inquiry into Oldham's case.

In response, Phillips said that the previous Conservative government, of which Badenoch was a part, had also supported a local inquiry in Oldham, while Keir Starmer accused Badenoch of only jumping "on the bandwagon" after recent tweets from Elon Musk (who called Phillips a "rape genocide apologist" and suggested she was attempting to shield Starmer from blame since he led the Crown Prosecution Service when the abuse occurred), highlighting how she never raised the issue during her previous seven years in government, which included periods when she served as the Children's Minister and the Minister for Women and Equalities. Farage responded by accusing both major parties of failing victims over the years and a week later announced that Reform UK would raise money to appoint "independent arbiters" to examine gang rapes across Britain if the government refused to do it itself.

Starmer said politicians and activists were "spreading lies and misinformation" over grooming gangs, and were appealing to the far-right. (Note: Starmer said: "When politicians, and I mean politicians, who sat in government for many years are casual about honesty, decency, truth and the rule of law, calling for inquiries because they want to jump on a bandwagon of the far-right, then that affects politics because a robust debate can only be based on the true facts and that is why this is actually an important point about our politics, not about what anybody may or may not say on Twitter. My fight to change the way that the prosecution service operated is a matter of public record. Making sure the men responsible for these despicable acts were brought to justice. Put in the dock... then behind bars. That is why I brought the first prosecution for a grooming gang. Far-right voices have tried to rewrite history. Those spreading lies and misinformation are not interested in the victims. Those cheerleading for Tommy Robinson - a thug who was jailed for almost collapsing a grooming case - are not interested in justice. They are only interested in themselves.") Professor Alexis Jay, who chaired the Independent Inquiry into Child Sexual Abuse said: "It doesn't need more consultation, it does not need more research or discussion, it just needs to be done."

=== Israel's expulsion of Labour MPs ===
In early April 2025, Badenoch was the subject of cross-party condemnation when she defended Israel's decision to refuse entry and then deport Labour MP's Yuan Yang and Abtisam Mohamed, who were traveling as part of a charity delegation consisting of Medical Aid for Palestinians and the Council for Arab-British Understanding. In response to Badenoch's comments on Sky News that she respected every country's right to control its borders, the UK Foreign Secretary David Lammy released a statement saying it was "disgraceful you are cheerleading another country for detaining and deporting two British MPs". A few days later, after Badenoch criticised the government of China for not allowing Liberal Democrat MP Wera Hobhouse to enter Hong Kong, she claimed "the two situations are different" when challenged by reporters about her two contrasting responses to the similar diplomatic incidents.

=== 2025 local elections ===
Under Badenoch's leadership, in the May 2025 local elections the Conservatives lost about two-thirds of the council seats held. All 16 councils where the Conservatives had a majority were lost to Reform UK or the Liberal Democrats, or no party had a majority. Badenoch apologised to all unseated councillors, describing the result as "a bloodbath". In the 2025 Runcorn and Helsby by-election for a seat in Parliament, held on the same day, the Conservative Party won 7% of the vote, coming third behind Reform and Labour on 39% each.

=== India–UK Free Trade Agreement ===
After the India–United Kingdom Free Trade Agreement was agreed in principle on 6 May 2025, Badenoch criticized the deal's three year UK National Insurance exemption for Indian workers. However, Badenoch later faced accusations of hypocrisy when the Financial Times quoted unnamed Indian government officials in claiming she herself had offered giving Indian employees a similar two year N.I. relief during negotiations when she was the UK Trade Secretary.

=== Defections to Reform UK ===
As of May 2026, Badenoch has been faced with many defections to Reform UK. In June 2025, after a string of Tory councillors left the party to join Reform UK, Badenoch told the Scottish Tory conference she was unconcerned with this perceived threat from Nigel Farage's party and asserted the defections were actually a "good thing", because in her opinion those leaving did not "believe in conservatism". In July 2025, after former Tory cabinet ministers David Jones and Jake Berry joined Reform, Badenoch made a speech stating that any other Tories who "are not interested in coming up with a proper policy plan" and defected to Reform in the belief it would increase their chances of being elected were "welcome to do so". In early September 2025, after sitting Tory MP Danny Kruger accompanied former Minister for Health Maria Caulfield and former Culture Secretary Nadine Dorries in defecting to Reform, it was revealed that Badenoch was nicknamed 'Santa Claus' within Reform party headquarters as she gave them "a Christmas gift every day". Badenoch later denounced her former colleagues as people "running away from problems" rather than trying to solve the issues the Tory party was currently facing. In December 2025, former Tory party MPs Ben Bradley, Jonathan Gullis, Lia Nici and Chris Green defected to Reform. Gullis, who was previously Conservative Party deputy chair, was quoted by the BBC as saying the Tories had "lost touch with the people it was meant to serve". In January 2026, Nadhim Zahawi, who previously held several senior roles including as Chancellor of the Exchequer under previous Tory governments, and former Home Secretary Suella Braverman defected to Reform, as did Conservative MP for Romford Andrew Rosindell.

==== Sacking of Robert Jenrick ====
On 15 January 2026, Badenoch announced that she had removed Robert Jenrick from his post as shadow justice secretary, as well as removing the whip and suspending his party membership with immediate effect, after she was "presented with clear, irrefutable evidence" that he intended to defect to Reform UK in a way "designed to be as damaging as possible" to the Conservative Party. Later in the day Jenrick joined Reform UK, and at a joint press conference with Nigel Farage he confirmed he had defected to Reform UK after becoming disillusioned with the Conservative Party. He also criticised his former colleagues Mel Stride and Priti Patel for their mishandling of welfare reform and immigration while in government.

=== European Convention on Human Rights ===
In October 2025, Badenoch announced that if the Conservative party wins the next general election, they would take the United Kingdom out of the European Convention on Human Rights (ECHR), as a study by Conservative lawyers asserted that the ECHR blocks the deportation of illegal immigrants and often leads to the legal persecution of British military veterans. The announcement was criticized by Amnesty International, who accused the Tory party of "scapegoating people fleeing persecution" in order to strip civil rights protections from British citizens.

=== 2026 Shadow Cabinet reshuffle ===
In August 2026, Badenoch made a significant shadow cabinet reshuffle, sacking several senior frontbench MPs, and promoting backbenchers to her shadow cabinet. Several of the shadow cabinet members that were removed from their roles had senior positions in previous Conservative governments.

The most important shadow cabinet dismissals included Priti Patel as Shadow Foreign Secretary, Mel Stride as Shadow Chancellor of the Exchequer, Stuart Andrew as Shadow Health Secretary, and James Cleverly as Shadow Housing Secretary.

The most important shadow cabinet appointments included Alex Burghart as Deputy Leader of the Opposition, the promotion of Andrew Griffith to the Shadow Chancellor of the Exchequer role, former Tory leadership candidate Tom Tugendhat as Shadow Foreign Secretary, and Claire Coutinho as Shadow Business, Science, and Trade secretary and the deputy for the newly-appointed shadow chancellor.

== Political views ==
Badenoch is described as being on the right wing of the Conservative Party. She has said she is "not really left-leaning on anything". She has identified English philosopher Roger Scruton and American economist Thomas Sowell as her influences, citing Sowell's Basic Economics as an influence.

During her parliamentary maiden speech in 2017, Badenoch named Winston Churchill, Airey Neave and Margaret Thatcher as political heroes. She has also been characterised as a social conservative and "anti-woke" politician. Badenoch has described herself as a "net zero sceptic" and has repeatedly voted in Parliament against measures to reduce greenhouse gas emissions.

In June 2026, Badenoch attended the Alliance for Responsible Citizenship conference, which champions themes of opposition to green economic policies, opposition to abortion and opposition to multiculturalism, while supporting social conservatism. The conference was attended by representatives from far-right parties, American state officials who have sought to interfere with British abortion laws, Farage and those from Trump’s administration, including his energy secretary, a former fossil fuel executive.

=== Abortion ===
Badenoch describes herself as "pro‑choice, but not pro‑abortion up to full term."

She was absent from a vote on amendments to the Northern Ireland (Executive Formation etc) Act 2019. In July 2022, she abstained on a proposal concerning decriminalisation for abortion services and voted against a telemedicine proposal. In October 2024, she voted against a Labour government bill to introduce buffer zones around abortion clinics. On 17 June 2025, she voted against a bill that decriminalised self-managed abortion in England and Wales.

=== Assisted dying ===
In June 2025, Badenoch voted against the Terminally Ill Adults (End of Life) Bill, which proposes to legalise assisted suicide for terminally ill adults in England and Wales.

=== Race relations ===
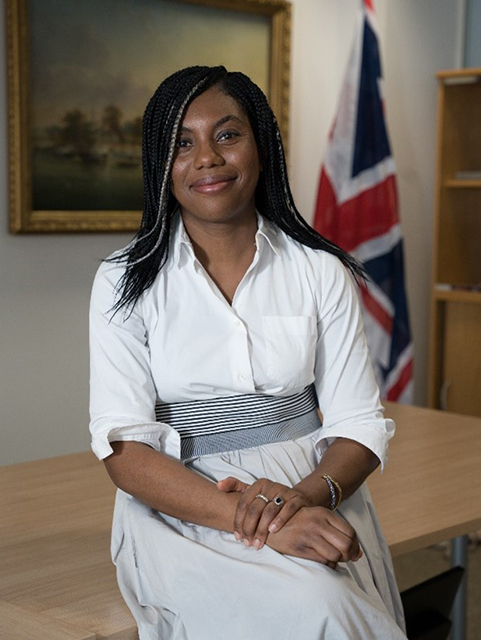
Badenoch as Minister for Equalities and Levelling Up Communities

During a House of Commons debate in April 2021, Badenoch criticised the Labour Party's response to a report compiled by the Commission on Race and Ethnic Disparities that had declared Britain was not institutionally racist. Labour had described the report as "cherry-picking of data", while the party's former frontbench MP Dawn Butler claimed the report was "gaslighting on a national scale", describing those who put it together as "racial gatekeepers". Badenoch accused Labour of "wilful misrepresentations" over the report and responded to Butler's comments by stating "It is wrong to accuse those who argue for a different approach as being racism deniers or race traitors. It's even more irresponsible, dangerously so, to call ethnic minority people racial slurs like Uncle Toms, coconuts, house slaves or house negroes for daring to think differently."

In a Black History Month debate in the House of Commons in October 2020, she reiterated the government's opposition to primary and secondary schools teaching white privilege and similar "elements of critical race theory" as uncontested facts. ConservativeHome readers voted Badenoch's speech on critical race theory 2020 "speech of the year", in which she said that any school that teaches "elements of political race theory as fact, or which promotes partisan political views such as defunding the police without offering a balanced treatment of opposing views, is breaking the law."

During her leadership campaign launch, Badenoch expressed criticism of identity politics in a 2022 article for The Times, arguing that, "Exemplified by coercive control, the imposition of views, the shutting down of debate, the end of due process, identity politics is not about tolerance or individual rights but the very opposite of our crucial and enduring British values."

=== Immigration ===
In December 2018, Badenoch praised the Home Secretary's decision to remove the annual limits on work visas and to allow students from the European Union to stay in the UK for six months after graduating.

In September 2024, Badenoch wrote an article for The Sunday Telegraph in which she argued that "We can not be naïve and assume immigrants will automatically abandon ancestral ethnic hostilities at the border, or that all cultures are equally valid. They are not." She argued that "Our country is not a dormitory for people to come here and make money. It is our home. Those we chose to welcome, we expect to share our values and contribute to our society. British citizenship is more than having a British passport but also a commitment to the UK and its people." Badenoch also called for a better "integration strategy" that emphasised British values and culture, referring in her article to the head of the Equality and Human Rights Commission, Baroness Falkner, who had reported that "we seem to be failing to integrate" new immigrants, and "called for new arrivals to the UK to be required to take an 'integration course', adopting an approach used in Germany".

During an interview on the BBC's Sunday with Laura Kuenssberg broadcast in September 2024, Badenoch stated that she believed in "western values, the principles which have made this country great, and I think that we need to make sure that we continue to abide by those principles, to keep the society that we have now." She said that immigrants who bring "foreign conflicts" should not be welcomed into the country, citing what she argued as the "number of recent immigrants who hate Israel. It is quite clear that there are many people who have recently come to this country who have brought views from where they used to be that have no place here." She argued that the United Kingdom needed a stronger strategy to "make sure that we have a shared culture and a shared identity".

Badenoch is opposed to allowing devolved governments within the United Kingdom to operate a separate immigration and visa policy.

In November 2024, amid the release of revised figures showing that net immigration to the United Kingdom had reached a record 906,000 for the year ending June 2023, Badenoch stated that the Conservative Party had "got it wrong" on immigration during their time in power. She noted that while the post-Brexit immigration system ended freedom of movement within the European Union, consecutive Conservative governments failed because the subsequent opening of new non-EU visa routes caused net migration to reach record highs. Following her election as leader of the party, she announced a review into "every policy, treaty and part of our legal framework – including the ECHR and the Human Rights Act". Badenoch said the Conservatives will introduce a new immigration policy under her leadership which will include a "strict numerical cap" on immigration, tightening access to British passports and a "zero tolerance" policy on foreign criminals staying in the United Kingdom.

As part of her policy programme announced in early 2025, Badenoch proposed doubling the standard residency requirement for foreign workers to obtain permanent residency (Indefinite Leave to Remain) from five to ten years. Under this proposal, permanent residency would be withheld from migrants who claimed social welfare benefits or utilized social housing during their stay, with Badenoch arguing that permanent settlement should be restricted to those who make a net fiscal contribution to the UK economy. To protect the domestic labor market, she also supported raising the minimum salary threshold for foreign workers, characterizing the previous limit of £26,200 as insufficient because it permitted an influx of low-wage overseas labor that depressed domestic wages. Furthermore, she has argued that British businesses and sectors such as healthcare and hospitality should prioritise domestic recruitment by investing in training and increasing wages for local workers and young graduates instead of relying on cheaper foreign labour.

During her tenure as Secretary of State for Business and Trade, Badenoch maintained a strict position regarding immigration in international trade negotiations. In late 2024, she stated that she had resisted the finalisation of a UK-India Free Trade Agreement (FTA) due to demands from the Indian government for additional concessions on visas and migration, stating that even as she was trying to limit immigration, the Indian side "kept trying to bring in migration and I said no". In May 2025, she criticised the subsequent Labour government's finalized trade deal with India, describing it as a "two-tier" tax arrangement because it allowed short-term Indian workers and their employers to be exempt from UK National Insurance contributions.

=== Foreign policy ===
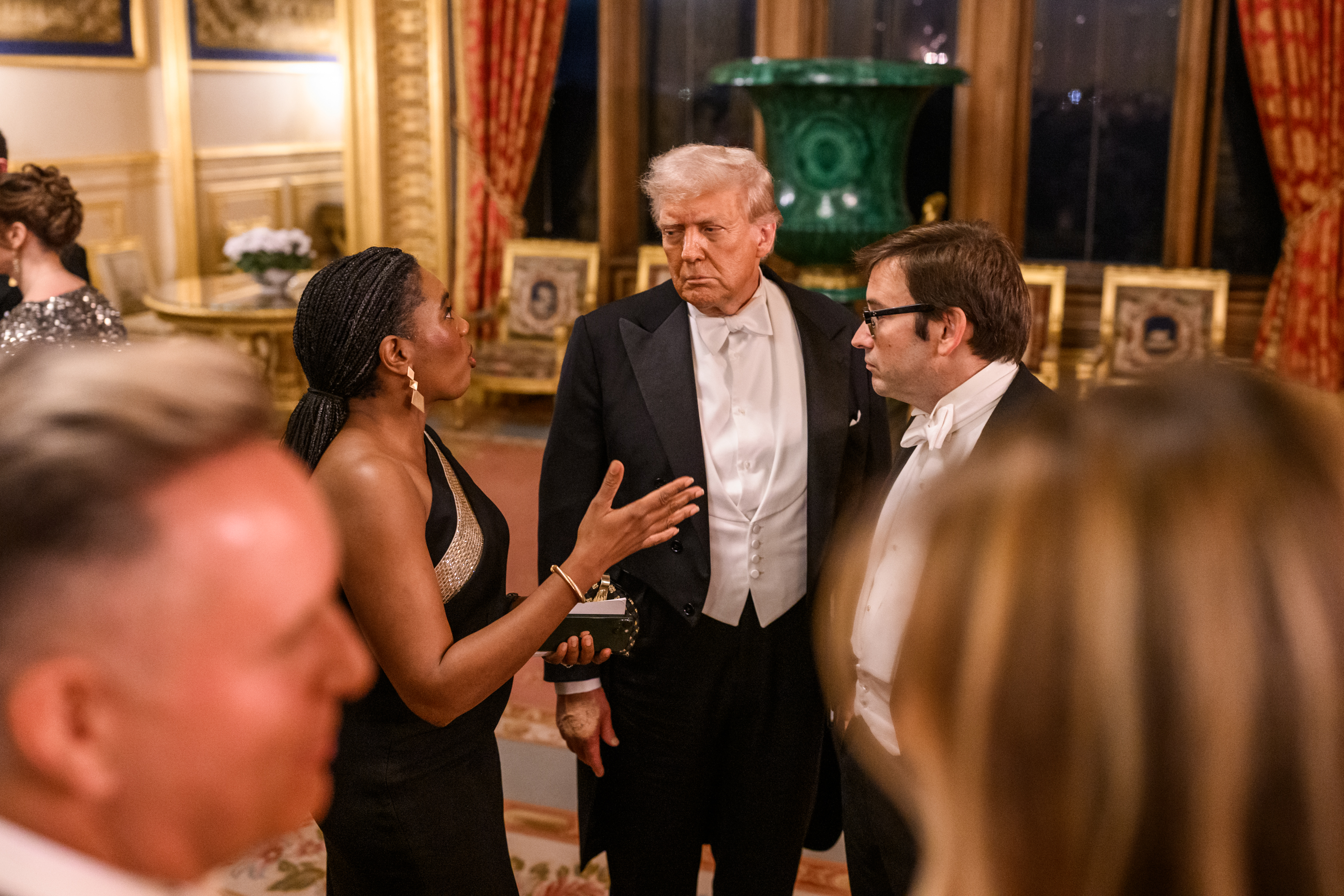
Badenoch with US President Donald Trump in September 2025

Badenoch has expressed support for strengthening ties between Israel and the United Kingdom. During her leadership bid, Badenoch wrote a letter to the Conservative Friends of Israel saying: "If I am leader of the Conservative Party, we will continue to strengthen our ties with Israel and root out the tragic resurgence of antisemitism in the UK. We will be true to our values." A November 2024 article in The Times of Israel described Badenoch as a "pro-Israel" politician. In May 2025, in an interview with Trevor Phillips on Sky News, Badenoch defended Israel's war on Gaza, described it as a "proxy war on behalf of the UK" and stated that the war aligns with "Britain's national interest." Badenoch also dismissed Israel's actions as a "genocide", stating, "Israel is fighting a war. It is not for me to police exactly how they are doing that…It is not a genocide, as people are saying."

In her role as International Trade Secretary, Badenoch rejected demands to revoke arms exports to Israel following the outbreak of the Gaza war and condemned the October 7 attacks. In a September 2024 interview with Sky News Badenoch argued that Israel had shown "moral clarity in dealing with its enemies and the enemies of the West" with military action targeting the leaders of Hamas and Hezbollah.

Following the 2024 United States presidential election which resulted in the victory of Donald Trump, Badenoch wrote a column in The Daily Telegraph imploring the British government to resume trade deal talks with the United States which had been scrapped by the Biden administration. She argued that the reelection of Trump was a "golden opportunity" for agreements between Britain and America and claimed "the onus is now on the Labour Government to put aside their embarrassing student politics diplomacy, which has already shot Britain in the foot on Israel and the Chagos Islands" and warned that delays by the government to engage with the Trump administration would put Britain at risk if the White House introduced trade tariffs.

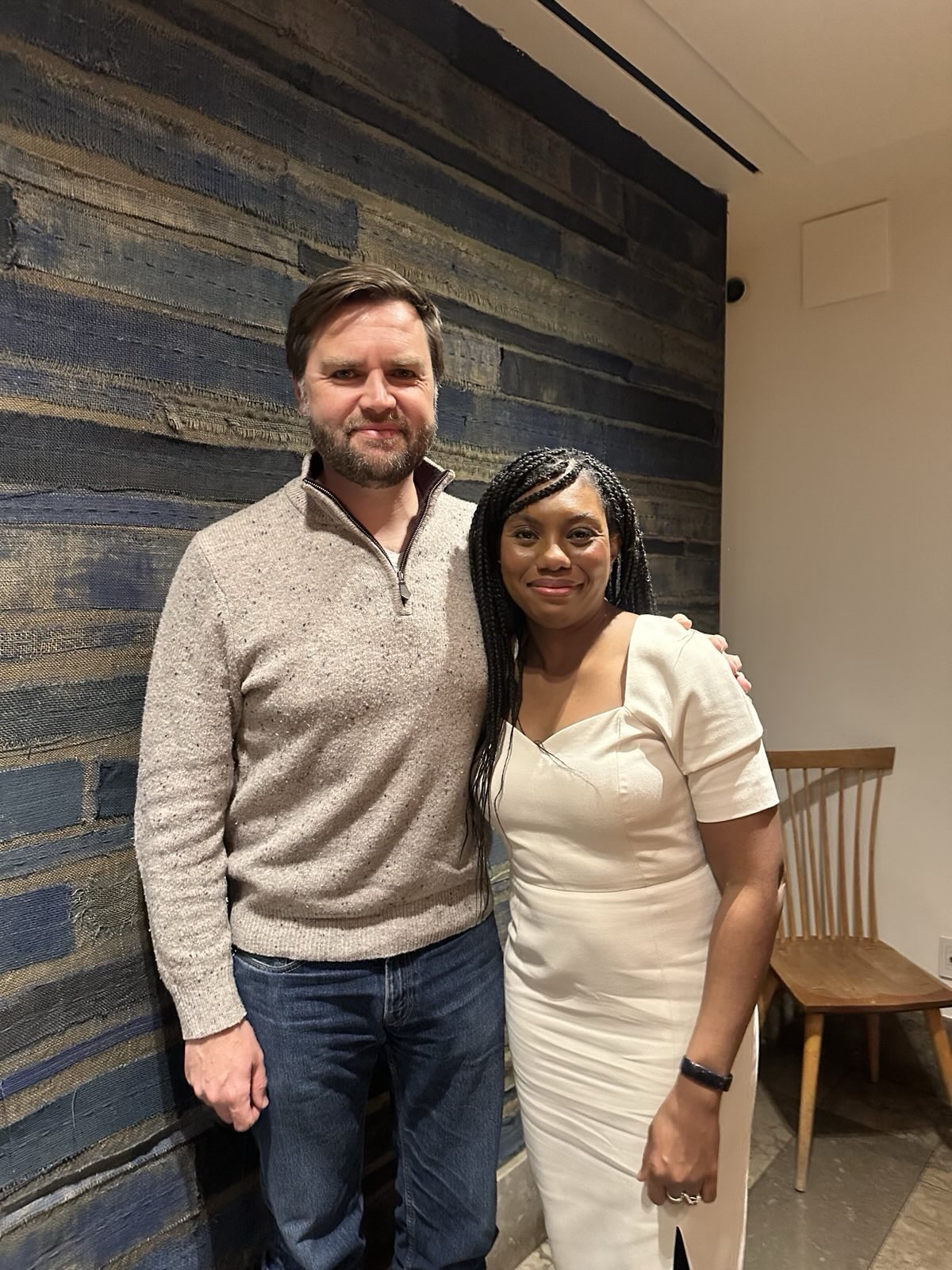
Badenoch with US Vice-President JD Vance

In 2023, Badenoch referred to China's role on the world stage as a "challenge" rather than a "threat" to Britain and argued "Chinese people are different from the Chinese government and it is important to be diplomatic." By 2024, Badenoch argued that China represented a threat through "economic coercion" and a deliberate strategy to "flood the market, driving other nations' industries out of business." She wrote "too many of the world's economies continue to develop a dependency on China, including the UK. This is dangerous for our economy and our freedom. We need to understand exactly how our exposure to China impacts our national security to ensure that we can't be blackmailed" and argued that net zero targets in Britain risked handing the Chinese government an unfair economic advantage through outsourced EV, battery and solar production to China involving slave labour. Badenoch argued that Britain should participate in the Trans-Pacific Partnership and embed itself in trade agreements within the Indo-Pacific region to create more economic competition with China.

In December 2024, Badenoch was criticised by Nigerian Vice-President Kashim Shettima for previous comments in which he perceived her to be "denigrating her nation of origin". In response, a spokesman for Badenoch indicated that she would not be withdrawing any previous statements, adding that she "is not the PR for Nigeria".

In May 2025, Badenoch said that the Conservative Party is the "last line of defence" for Israel in the UK parliament while delivering a speech at the Conservative Friends of Israel's business lunch.

In July 2025, Badenoch declared her admiration for the policies of Argentine President Javier Milei, whom she considers a role model for his "chainsaw" economic measures, praising Milei and crediting him with lowering Argentina's inflation and "fighting woke ideology", further adding that she wants to be "the British Javier Milei."

In January 2026, Badenoch stated she had "no issue" with removing the Iranian regime, describing it as an "enemy" of the United Kingdom. She justified her position by stating Iran "would very happily wipe out the UK if it felt it could get away with it" and accused the regime of attempting assassinations on British soil. Badenoch subsequently criticised Starmer during the 2026 Iran war for "asking our allies to do what we should be doing ourselves" by not taking "offensive action" when British bases were attacked in Bahrain and Cyprus. She expanded by saying that the "RAF must strike Iran" to "prevent more attacks" on British bases abroad.

=== Colonialism ===
Regarding the United Kingdom's colonial history, Badenoch has argued that "there were terrible things that happened during the British Empire, there were other good things that happened, and we need to tell both sides of the story". She has attributed her views on the British Empire in part to her upbringing and education in Lagos, Nigeria, stating that she was not taught to regard the Empire as solely "an awful, terrible thing that oppressed and victimised us". She has also criticised what she sees as a tendency to encourage ethnic minority children in Britain to view themselves primarily as victims.

In leaked WhatsApp messages, Badenoch said "I don't care about colonialism because [I] know what we were doing before colonialism got there" and argued that Europeans "came in and just made a different bunch of winners and losers" on the African continent. She also stated that prior to colonisation, "There was never any concept of 'rights', so [the] people who lost out were old elites; not everyday people".

In a 2024 speech, Badenoch said: "It worries me when I hear people talk about wealth and success in the UK as being down to colonialism or imperialism or white privilege or whatever." Instead, she said "the Glorious Revolution of 1688 – which led to the development of the UK constitution and solidified the role of parliament – should be credited for providing the kind of economic certainty that paved the way for the Industrial Revolution."

In June 2025, after the agreement to return the Chagos Archipelago located in the British Indian Ocean Territory to Mauritius, Kemi Badenoch called the agreement "terrible", saying "why on Earth" should British taxpayers pay for tax cuts in Mauritius.

=== LGBT rights ===
In 2019, Badenoch abstained on a vote to extend same-sex marriage rights to Northern Ireland. In February 2023, Badenoch defended Scottish politician Kate Forbes after Forbes said marriage should only be between a man and a woman. Badenoch stated: "I support same-sex marriage and, like anyone, I'm disappointed when anyone disagrees with me. But if you're asking me to condemn someone for their religious views you've failed to understand the basic responsibilities of being minister for equality".

In November 2026, Badenoch said she had "no interest in supporting LGBT+ people".

==== Transgender rights ====
According to academics at several British universities, Badenoch has promoted anti-transgender views and met with anti-trans groups.

In 2021, Vice News received leaked audio from 2018 in which Badenoch said "Even when, you know, so, people hear about, you know like the whole bathroom thing, it's actually more of an American thing but they have a similar problem, that, right so now it's not just about being free to marry who you want, you now want to have men using women's bathrooms." She was accused by critics of mocking gay marriage and of transphobia for referring to trans women as "men". A government spokesperson rejected these claims, saying that "This 2018 comment has been taken out of context, with the Minister making a clear point about striking the balance for equality and fairness when there are multiple and often competing demands between different groups. It should not be used to misrepresent her views." In March 2021, Badenoch was encouraged to "consider her position" as an Equalities Minister by Jayne Ozanne, one of a group of three government LGBT advisers who quit their roles due to the decision by the government not to include transgender conversion therapy in its plans to ban gay conversion therapy, with Ozanne describing a speech by Badenoch on the issue as being "appalling" and the "final straw".

As Minister of State for Equalities, Badenoch opposed plans by the Financial Conduct Authority to allow transgender employees to self-identify in the workplace, opposed gender-neutral toilets in public buildings, and has spoken in favour of retaining single-sex spaces such as toilets, professional sports, changing rooms, and domestic violence shelters for women.

In 2023, Badenoch gave a speech before the House of Commons in which she announced regulations stripping the ability of transgender migrants from certain countries to acquire documents in the UK to match those brought from their countries of origin. This was stated as being due to these countries allowing trans people to transition "too easily". She stated that "It is this government's policy that the UK does not recognise self-identification for the purpose of obtaining a Gender Recognition Certificate" and that it "should not be possible for a person who does not satisfy the criteria for UK legal gender recognition to use the overseas routes to do so".

In December 2023, it was reported that Badenoch had not met with any major LGBTQ+ rights organisation since becoming Equalities Minister, but had met with anti-transgender groups LGB Alliance and Sex Matters.

In February 2024, Badenoch stated in a letter to the Commons Women and Equalities Committee that children likely to grow up gay may be wrongly medicalised as transgender. She wrote: "Evidence that children likely to grow up to be gay [and be same-sex attracted] might be subjected to conversion practices on the basis of gender identity rather than their sexual orientation…. A young person and their family may notice that they are gender non-conforming earlier than they are aware of their developing sexual orientation. If gender non-conformity is misinterpreted as evidence of being transgender and a child is medically affirmed, the child may not have had a chance to identify, come to terms with or explore a same-sex orientation".

Badenoch went on to announce the government's plans to move forward on a conversion therapy ban, while saying that gender-affirming healthcare for young people who question their gender was "a new form of conversion therapy" as, in her view, "we are seeing I would say almost an epidemic of young gay children being told that they are trans and being put on a medical pathway for irreversible decisions and regretting what they have done", further stating that a draft bill would address the concern that clinicians are "fearful of giving honest clinical advice to a child because if they do not automatically affirm and medicalise a child's new gender they will be labelled transphobic". She further announced plans to ban social transition in British schools, according to which transgender children would be permitted to self-identity as the gender identity of their choice without parental consent or knowledge.

In an article in The Sunday Times in the aftermath of the publication of the Cass Review, an investigation into gender identity services in the NHS, Badenoch wrote that had "those who warned that gender services in the NHS had been hijacked by ideologues been listened to instead of gagged, children would not have been harmed and the Cass review would not have been required. Our responsibility is to ensure that nothing like it ever happens again."

After the Supreme Court of the United Kingdom ruled in For Women Scotland Ltd v The Scottish Ministers in 2025 that the terms "man" and "woman" in the Equality Act 2010 referred to biological sex and not gender or gender identity, Badenoch described the judgment as a "victory for all of the women who faced personal abuse or lost their jobs for stating the obvious", and declared that "the era of Keir Starmer telling us women can have penises has come to an end".

Badenoch called for a comprehensive review of equality and gender recognition laws, stating: "Biological sex is real. A gender recognition certificate is there to show that someone is now transgender, but that doesn't change their biology." She further emphasized, "The Supreme Court has given a judgment, but I think that we need to update those laws to ensure that they are there to prevent discrimination, not for social engineering".

In May 2025, Badenoch reiterated her support for a complete ban on transgender women competing in women's physical sports. Speaking to GB News, she stated: "You shouldn't have men swimming or running against women, we are biologically different, and that's something that needs to be recognised by all the sporting bodies." Badenoch differentiated between physical and non-physical competitions, suggesting that exceptions could be made for activities such as chess where "it's not to do with physical attributes."

=== Maternity pay ===
In September 2024, while standing to be leader of the Conservative Party, Badenoch was asked if she believed that "maternity pay is excessive". In response, Badenoch answered, "I think it's gone too far, too far the other way in terms of general business regulation, we need to allow businesses, especially small businesses, to make more of their own decisions". Later the same day, during an interview with Sky News, Badenoch stated that maternity pay was "a good thing" and said "I don't think it is excessive", saying that she was speaking about business regulation in general, rather than maternity pay specifically.

=== Economics and class ===
In a 2024 pamphlet distributed as part of her campaign for leadership of the Conservative Party, Badenoch said that politics has shifted away from class "in the old sense – increasingly, whether you are high income does not drive your voting patterns. Educated voters are moving left, and many private sector voters on average incomes are moving right." She also said that a new 'progressive ideology' was on the rise built on "the twin pillars of constant intervention on behalf of protecting marginalised, vulnerable groups, including protecting us from ourselves – and the idea that bureaucrats make better decisions than individuals, or even democratic nation states".

Badenoch said that the consequent growth in government regulations and public expenditure cripples economic growth, polarises societies, and leads to a "new and growing bureaucratic class", where "more and more jobs are related not to providing goods and services in the marketplace, but are instead focused around administering government rules."

In December 2025, Badenoch proposed a plan to reallocate £17 billion from green energy and research budgets to bolster the UK's military and "accelerate war readiness".

== Personal life ==
Badenoch is married to banker Hamish Badenoch; they have two daughters and a son.

Badenoch's husband previously worked for Deutsche Bank and was a Conservative councillor from 2014 to 2018 on Merton Borough Council. He also contested Foyle for the Northern Ireland Conservatives at the 2015 general election.

Badenoch credits the NHS with preventing her miscarrying her first daughter, having had emergency surgery when she went into labour at 20 weeks.

She was a board member of the Charlton Triangle Homes housing association until 2016, and was also a school governor at St Thomas the Apostle College in Southwark, and the Jubilee Primary School.

Badenoch describes herself as an agnostic, who lost her faith in God, but considers herself a cultural Christian, and said that her maternal grandfather was a Methodist minister in Nigeria.

Badenoch identifies as Yoruba, not Nigerian, stating: "I have nothing in common with the people from the north of the country, the Boko Haram where the Islamism is, those were our ethnic enemies". In August 2025, she said that she had not renewed her Nigerian passport since the early 2000s, and no longer identified as Nigerian.

== Notes ==
Parliament of the United Kingdom
| Preceded by Sir Alan Haselhurst | Member of Parliament for Saffron Walden; 2017–2024 | Succeeded by Constituency abolished |
| New constituency | Member of Parliament for North West Essex; 2024–present | Incumbent |
Political offices
| Preceded by Nadhim Zahawi | Parliamentary Under-Secretary of State for Children and Families; 2019–2020 | Succeeded by Vicky Ford |
| Preceded by The Baroness Williams of Trafford | Parliamentary Under-Secretary of State for Equalities; 2020–2021 | Succeeded by Herself as Minister of State for Equalities |
| Preceded by Simon Clarke | Exchequer Secretary to the Treasury; 2020–2021 | Succeeded by Helen Whately |
| Preceded by Luke Hall as Minister of State for Regional Growth and Local Government | Minister of State for Housing, Communities and Local Government; 2021 | Succeeded by Herself as Minister of State for Levelling Up Communities |
| Preceded by Herself as Minister of State for Housing, Communities and Local Government | Minister of State for Levelling Up Communities; 2021–2022 | Succeeded by Paul Scully |
| Preceded by Herself as Parliamentary Under-Secretary of State for Equalities | Minister of State for Equalities; 2021–2022 | Succeeded by Amanda Solloway |
| Preceded by Anne-Marie Trevelyan | Secretary of State for International Trade; 2022–2023 | Office abolished |
| Preceded by Anne-Marie Trevelyan | President of the Board of Trade; 2022–2024 | Succeeded by Jonathan Reynolds |
| Preceded by Nadhim Zahawi as Minister for Equalities | Minister for Women and Equalities; 2022–2024 | Succeeded by Bridget Phillipson |
| New office | Secretary of State for Business and Trade; 2023–2024 | Succeeded by Jonathan Reynolds |
| Preceded by Angela Rayner | Shadow Secretary of State for Levelling Up, Housing and Communities; 2024 | Succeeded by Kevin Hollinrake |
| Preceded by Rishi Sunak | Leader of the Opposition; 2024–present | Incumbent |
Party political offices
| Preceded by Rishi Sunak | Leader of the Conservative Party; 2024–present | Incumbent |
