= Nadine White =

British journalist (born 1992)

- Born: 22 October 1992 (age 34)
- Education: University College London
- Occupation: Journalist
- Employer(s): The Independent; Birmingham City University

Nadine White (born 22 October 1992) is a British journalist and filmmaker. In March 2021, she joined The Independent as the first dedicated race correspondent in UK journalism.

White is the director of the award-winning documentary Barrel Children: The Families Windrush Left Behind, which explores the legacy of Caribbean migration to the United Kingdom. She is also the founder of Brixton Heights, a production company dedicated to amplifying Black British stories through media, education and cultural programming.

== Early life and education ==
White was born in 1992 in London, England, growing up in Brixton with her Jamaican parents. She has two brothers. She attended south London schools before graduating from University College London, where she studied English Literature. She subsequently did NCTJ training at News Associates, London.

== Career ==
She worked as a journalist for The Voice newspaper, the Weekly Gleaner UK, and for the HuffPost between 2013 and 2021, leading coverage around race, before joining The Independent as that newspaper's Race Correspondent.

In January 2021, White was accused on Twitter by UK government equalities minister Kemi Badenoch of undermining trust in the COVID-19 vaccination programme, charges that White denied. The accusations came after White sent emails to Badenoch's press office as part of her research for a story.

=== Recognition and awards ===
White's work has been shortlisted for awards including, in 2018, the Hugh Cudlipp Student Journalism Prize, and an Amnesty Media Award. She was also the first black reporter to be shortlisted for the Paul Foot Award, together with Emma Youle for their SPAC Nation expose.

In 2020, White won a Mischief + MHP 30 To Watch: Young Journalist Award, and also in 2020 won the inaugural Paulette Wilson Windrush Award, from the Windrush Caribbean Film Festival.

In April 2021, White was included by Forbes magazine on their annual 30 Under 30 list of "young visionary leaders brashly reinventing business and society". In October 2021, she was named on BBC Radio 1Xtra Future Figures list as one of 29 individuals, groups, and organisations from across the United Kingdom who are "Making Black History Now".

In November 2021, White was appointed as a Visiting Industry Fellow at Birmingham City University. – a position she continues to hold as of April 2025.

=== Documentaries ===
In 2023, White made her directorial debut with Barrel Children: The Families Windrush Left Behind, a feature-length and self-produced documentary exploring the untold stories of Caribbean children who were left behind when their parents migrated to the United Kingdom during the Windrush era. These children – often referred to as "barrel children" after the barrels and parcels of goods sent back to them – experienced years of separation from their families. The film presents first-hand accounts of this experience and examines the emotional and psychological effects of long-distance parenting and fragmented families within Caribbean diaspora communities.

Barrel Children was released in June 2023 and premiered as one of the UK's top-performing independent films during its opening week. It received critical acclaim for its poignant storytelling and social impact, including a glowing review by labour Party MP Diane Abbott, who called it a "great debut" and "an extensively researched and moving account of the children of the Windrush generation separated from their parents". The documentary was screened across the United Kingdom, the Caribbean and the United States, and has been credited with widening public understanding of Caribbean migration histories beyond the traditional Windrush narrative.

In 2024, White became the first woman to receive the Menelik Shabazz Prize at the Windrush Caribbean Film Festival, an award that honours a trailblazing filmmaker of Caribbean heritage. The previous recipient of the prize was Adjani Salmon, creator of the BBC series Dreaming Whilst Black.

White has also directed and produced several shorter films exploring race, identity and inequality.

=== Published works ===
White has contributed chapters to two notable anthologies exploring race, identity, and lived experience in contemporary Britain.

In 2021, she was a contributor to Black British Lives Matter, a bestselling essay collection edited by Lenny Henry and Marcus Ryder. The book features leading Black British voices from across media, the arts, politics and academia. Alongside White, contributors include Doreen Lawrence, David Olusoga and Leroy Logan. White's chapter draws from her work as a journalist reporting on race, inequality and institutional accountability.

She also contributed to Still Breathing: 100 Black Voices on Racism – 100 Ways to Change the Narrative, edited by Suzette Llewellyn and Suzanne Packer. The anthology gathers intergenerational Black British voices to reflect on racism, resistance, and the path forward. Contributors include Trevor Phillips, Judith Jacob, Bonnie Greer and David Lammy. White’s chapter offers a personal and professional perspective grounded in her experiences navigating the UK media landscape.
