= John William Ward =

John William Ward may refer to:

- John Ward, 1st Earl of Dudley (1781–1833), British statesman
- John William Ward (manager) (born 1942), British trade unionist and opera administrator
- John William Ward (professor) (1922–1985), professor of English and history, and President of Amherst College
