= Adegboyega =

Nigerian given name

- Gender: Male
- Language: Yoruba

Origin
- Origin: Yoruba
- Meaning: The crown increased (our) honour
- Region of origin: South-west Nigeria

Other names
- Variant forms: Gbóyèga; Bóyèga

AdegboyegaAdegboyega is a Nigerian given name and surname of Yoruba origin primarily used in southwestern Nigeria. It combines the Yoruba words "ade" (meaning "crown"), "gbe" (meaning "carry"), "oye" (meaning "chieftaincy" or "honour"), and "ga" (meaning "tall" or "elevated"). Together, Adegboyega translates to "the crown has elevated (our) honour." Morphologically, it is written as "adé-gbé-oyè-ga."

== Notable individuals with the name ==
- Tobi Adegboyega (born 1980) Nigerian pastor
- Emmanuel Adegboyega (born 2003) Irish professional footballer
- John Boyega born John Adegboyega (born 1992) British actor and producer
- Samuel Adegboyega (1896 –1979) Nigerian Christian clergyman
- Gboyega Oyetola - born Adegboyega Isiaka Oyetola (born 1954) Nigerian politician
- Adegboyega Folaranmi Adedoyin (1922–2014) Nigerian-British -
- Adegboyega Dosunmu Amororo II–Olowu of Owu Kingdom.
- Adegboyega Edun (1860 –1925) Egba official.
- Paul Adegboyega Olawoore (1961 –2022) Nigerian Bishop.
- Festus Onigbinde - born Festus Adegboye Onigbinde (born 1938) Nigerian football manager.
- Adetokunbo Ademola - born Adetokunbo Adegboyega Ademola (1906 –1993)
