= Jonathan Baume =

British trade unionist

Jonathan Edward Baume (born 13 July 1953 in Wakefield) was General Secretary of the FDA from 1997 until 2012 and a member of the General Council of the Trades Union Congress (TUC) from 2001 to 2012.

He was appointed as a Civil Service Commissioner in April 2012 and is a Council member of the Advisory, Conciliation and Arbitration Service (Acas).

== Education ==
He was educated at Queen Elizabeth Grammar School, Wakefield, and Keble College, Oxford (BA Hons 1974; MA). While at university, he was active in student politics as a member of the International Socialists and then the Trotskyist International Marxist Group, the British section of the Fourth International.

== Career ==
- Oxfordshire County Council, 1974–77
- Department of Employment Group, 1977–87
- Trades Union Congress (Organisation and Industrial Relations Department), 1987–89
- FDA: Assistant General Secretary, 1989–94; Deputy General Secretary, 1994–97

Following the announcement of Elizabeth Symons' resignation as General Secretary, the FDA National Executive interviewed several candidates to replace her and agreed to nominate Baume as her successor. However, former FDA member Tony Engel (who had not been interviewed) was also nominated as a candidate. In the subsequent ballot of the whole FDA membership, Baume was elected with 68% of the votes cast.

Jonathan Baume retired as FDA General Secretary in late 2012, and was succeeded by the then Deputy General Secretary, Dave Penman.

== Government advisor ==
He has served on three Government advisory groups:

- Ministerial Advisory Group on Openness in the Public Sector 1998–99
- Ministerial Advisory Group on Implementation of the Freedom of Information Act 2001–present
- Age Advisory Group, Department of Trade and Industry 2004–present

== Outside interests ==
He is a member of the Campaign for the Protection of Rural England and the National Trust, and a Fellow of the Royal Society of Arts. After suffering from back problems, he took up yoga. His other hobbies are jazz, world music and rambling. He is a member of the Athenaeum Club.

Trade union offices
Preceded by Elizabeth Symons	General Secretary of the FDA; 1997–2012	Succeeded by Dave Penman
