= Norman Ellis =

British trade union leader

Norman David Ellis (born 23 November 1943) is a former British trade union leader.

Ellis attended Minchenden Grammar School in the Southgate area of London, then the University of Leeds. He completed a BA and PhD at the University of Leeds before, in 1969, finding work as a research officer with the Department of Employment. Two years later, he moved to Oxford, taking up the Leverhulme Fellowship in Industrial Relations at Nuffield College.

In 1974, Ellis was appointed as the first full-time general secretary of the Association of First Division Civil Servants. During his time as leader of the union, it affiliated to the Trades Union Congress for the first time. He left after four years to become Senior Industrial Relations Officer with the British Medical Association (BMA), and in 1980 became the BMA's under secretary. He served in this post for twenty years, writing a number of publications aimed at general practitioners.

== Personal life ==
Norman Ellis has one son and five grandchildren. He has been married to Valerie Ellis since 1966. He resided in Blackheath, London from 1976 to 2021. In 2021 he moved to an apartment on the island of Södermalm in Stockholm, Sweden. In 2022 he purchased an apartment in Kidbrooke Village, Greenwich, London and this is his primary UK residence.

Since moving to Stockholm, Norman Ellis has been taking the minutes at the Anglican Church of St Peter and St Sigfrid. He has also been an enthusiastic supporter of Zoom services.

== Works ==
- The impact of the Redundancy Payment act (1970)
- Management by Agreement (1973)
- Employing Staff (1984)
- Making sense of the Red Book (1995)
- Making Sense of Pensions and Retirement (1995)
- GPs Guide to Professional and Private Work Outside the NHS. (1995)
- BMA General Practitioner Handbook (1997)
- Staff Pensions in General Practice (1998)
- Making Sense of Partnerships (2004)

Trade union offices
Preceded by New position	General Secretary of the First Division Association; 1974–1978	Succeeded by John Ward
