= Association of Revenue and Customs =

UK trade union

The Association of Revenue and Customs (ARC) is a section of the FDA trade union which represents senior managers and professionals working in HM Revenue and Customs (HMRC). It started life as the Association of Inspectors of Tax (AIT). In 1988, under an 'Instrument of Transfer', it became a section of FDA. It changed its name to Union of Senior Revenue Officials (USRO) in 2002.

ARC was formed to replace USRO following the merger of the Inland Revenue and HM Customs and Excise Departments in 2005. Members are represented by an elected committee and by national officers of the FDA. An annual general meeting is held in May.

ARC's members are senior managers and professionals in HMRC, including tax professionals, lawyers, statisticians, economists and policy officers. Members must be Grade 7 HMRC staff or above to be eligible for membership, or in training grades - usually Band T. As at the end of 2015, the union had 2437 members.

A magazine for members, with contributions from activists/members and interviews is published quarterly, with an annual supplement reporting on the union's annual general meeting. ARC launched its own website, ARC Today, as a central resource for all information about the union and its activities, in June 2016.

== Presidents ==
- Michelle Wyer (May 2006 - May 2008)
- Terry Cook (May 2008 - May 2010)
- Graham Black (May 2010 - May 2012)
- Gareth Hills (May 2012 - May 2014)
- Tony Wallace (May 2014 - April 2016)
- Vicky Johnson (April 2016 - 2018)
- Paula Houghton (May 2018 - May 2020)
- Loz Hutton (May 2020 - May 2022)
- Loz Hutton (May 2022 - May 2024)
- Thomas Langrish (May 2024 - May 2026)
