= Elizabeth Symons, Baroness Symons of Vernham Dean =

British politician, trade unionist, and life peer (born 1951)

The Right Honourable The Baroness Symons of Vernham Dean PC
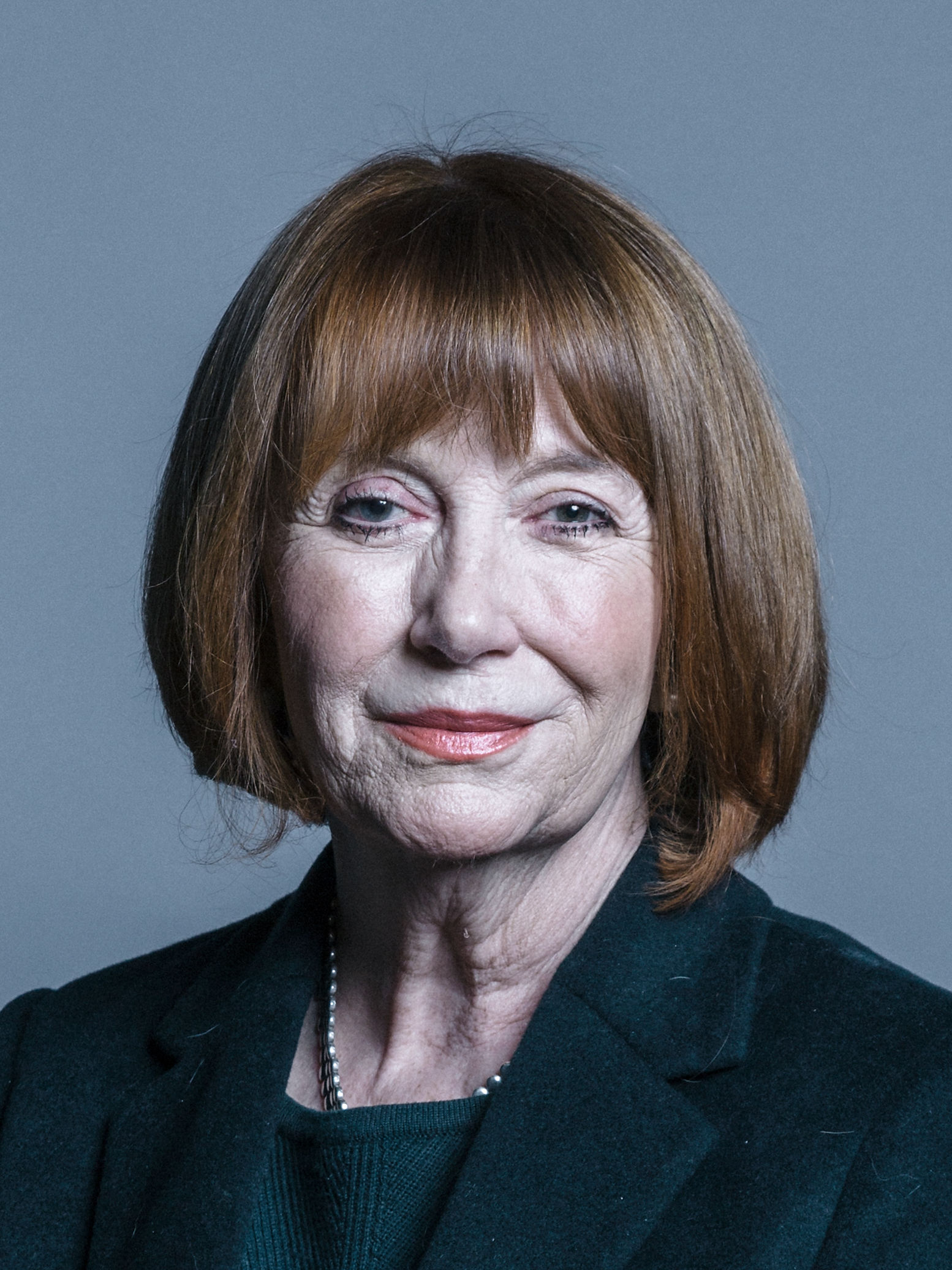
- Official portrait, 2018

Minister of State for the Middle East
- In office 11 June 2001 – 5 May 2005
- Prime Minister: Tony Blair
- Preceded by: John Battle
- Succeeded by: Kim Howells

Minister of State for Trade and Investment
- In office 11 June 2001 – 13 June 2003
- Prime Minister: Tony Blair
- Preceded by: Richard Caborn
- Succeeded by: Mike O'Brien

Deputy Leader of the House of Lords
- In office 8 June 2001 – 6 June 2005
- Prime Minister: Tony Blair
- Leader: The Lord Williams of Mostyn; The Baroness Amos
- Preceded by: The Lord Williams of Mostyn
- Succeeded by: The Lord Rooker

Minister of State for Defence Procurement
- In office 28 July 1999 – 8 June 2001
- Prime Minister: Tony Blair
- Preceded by: The Lord Gilbert
- Succeeded by: The Lord Bach

Parliamentary Under-Secretary of State for Foreign and Commonwealth Affairs
- In office 2 May 1997 – 28 July 1999
- Prime Minister: Tony Blair
- Preceded by: Liam Fox
- Succeeded by: Patricia Scotland

Member of the House of Lords
- Lord Temporal
- Life peerage 7 October 1996

Personal details
- Born: Elizabeth Conway Symons; 14 April 1951 (age 75)
- Party: Labour
- Parent: Ernest Symons
- Education: Girton College, Cambridge

Elizabeth Conway Symons, Baroness Symons of Vernham Dean PC (born 14 April 1951) is a British politician and trade unionist. A member of the Labour Party, she was Minister of State for the Middle East from 2001 to 2005. She is former General Secretary of the FDA Trade Union and has served as the Chair of the Arab British Chamber of Commerce (ABCC) since 2010.

== Early life ==
The daughter of Ernest Symons, Chairman of HM Board of Inland Revenue, Symons was educated at Putney High School for Girls and Girton College, Cambridge. She was an administration trainee at the Department of the Environment from 1974 to 1977. She then worked for the Inland Revenue Staff Federation from 1977 to 1989 and was General Secretary of the Association of First Division Civil Servants from 1989 to 1997. She resigned from this post following her appointment as a working peer.

== Political life ==
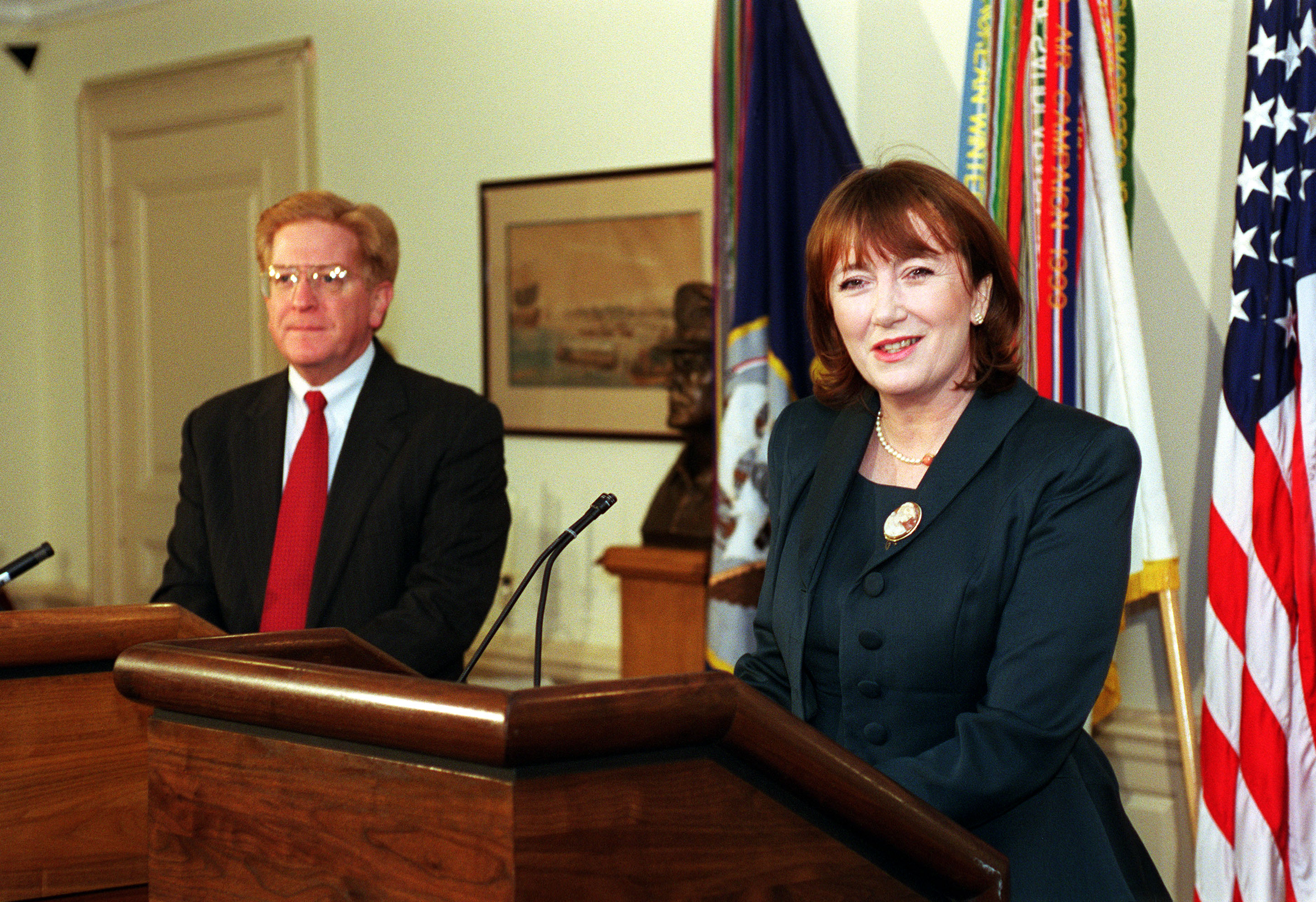
Lady Symons of Vernham Dean in her role as Minister of Defence Procurement.

Symons was created a Labour life peer as Baroness Symons of Vernham Dean, of Vernham Dean in the County of Hampshire, on 7 October 1996. From May 1997 to June 1999, she took her first government post, serving as a junior Foreign Office Minister. From 1999 until 2001, she was Minister of State for Defence Procurement and, from 2001 until 2003, Minister of State for Trade. From 2001 until 2005, she was Minister of State for Foreign Affairs with responsibility for the Middle East, International Security, Consular and Personal Affairs, and Deputy Leader of the House of Lords.

Symons was or remains a member of the British-American Project (BAP). It has a membership of 600 leaders and opinion formers, drawn equally from both countries, according to The Guardian, and holds an annual conference at which everything that is said is officially off-the-record. She also serves on the board of governors of the Ditchley Foundation.

In 2001, she married her long-standing partner, Phil Bassett, a former writer at The Times. They have a son. In October 2002, Bassett was appointed to the Strategic Communications Unit in 10 Downing Street, leaving in September 2003 to become special adviser to Lord Falconer of Thoroton, the Lord Chancellor and Secretary of State for Constitutional Affairs.

She is a Senior Network Member at the European Leadership Network (ELN).

=== Corporate career ===
Symons was not given a job in the re-shuffle after the general election of 5 May 2005, and became a non-executive director of British Airways.

Symons sits on the board of trustees of the John Smith Memorial Trust, a non governmental organisation set up in 1995 in memory of the late Labour party leader John Smith.

== Conflict of interest allegations ==
The Guardian alleged in its issue of 9 January 2005 that Symons may have used her office to give "special treatment" to David Mills, husband of Culture Secretary Tessa Jowell. Mills was seeking her assistance in sidestepping a U.S. trade embargo against Iran in order to sell $200 million worth of British Aerospace jets to that country.

On 9 February 2006, The Guardian mentioned her as one several former government ministers who had accepted lucrative positions as company directors and consultants. In the case of Symons, the companies involved were British Airways, DLA Piper and P&O.

In 2009 similar allegations were made when she took a lucrative post with UK investment bank MerchantBridge, which made millions from contracts in post-war Iraq, and also when she became a member of the National Economic Development Board of Libya shortly before the release of Abdelbaset Al Megrahi, who was convicted of the Lockerbie bombing. Symons resigned from the National Economic Development Board in 2011 in the midst of a popular uprising against the government of Muammar Gaddafi, one day after she had made remarks which appeared to praise Gaddafi's 'sound ideology'. Symons said the remarks had been made facetiously.

Political offices
Preceded by The Lord Williams of Mostyn	Deputy Leader of the House of Lords; 2001–2005	Succeeded by The Lord Rooker
Trade union offices
Preceded by John Ward	General Secretary of the First Division Association; 1989–1997	Succeeded by Jonathan Baume
