= MIPS =

MIPS may refer to:

== Businesses and organizations ==
- MIPS Technologies, an American semiconductor design firm
- Maharana Institute of Professional Studies, Kanpur, Uttar Pradesh, India
- Mansehra International Public School and College, Mansehra, Pakistan
- Monash Institute of Pharmaceutical Science (MIPS), Parkville, Victoria, Australia
- Munich Information Center for Protein Sequences, Germany

== Economics and finance ==
- Material input per unit of service, an eco-efficiency indicator
- Monthly income preferred stock, a financial instrument
- Merit-based Incentive Payment System, in United States Medicare

== Technology ==
=== Computing ===
- Million instructions per second, a CPU performance measure
- MIPS architecture, a RISC instruction set architecture
- Maximum inner-product search, in computer science
- Stanford MIPS, a research project
- MIPS-X, a follow-on project

=== Other technologies ===
- Molecularly imprinted polymer
- Multiband Imaging Photometer for Spitzer, on the Spitzer Space Telescope
- Multi-directional Impact Protection System, a helmet safety technology

== Other uses ==
- Menards Infiniti Pro Series, a former name of an Indy Pro Series automobile race
- MIPS, a rabbit in Super Mario 64
- Minimum ionizing particle, a term widely used in experimental particle physics

== See also ==
- MIP (disambiguation)
