= Ernest Symons =

British Civil Servant

Ernest Vize Symons CB (19 June 1913 – 5 November 1990) was a British Civil Servant who became the first Director General of the Board of Inland Revenue. His daughter is Elizabeth Symons (Baroness Symons of Vernham Dean).

Symons was educated at the Stationers' Company's School and University College London (UCL), where he studied History, and graduated in 1933. He served on the UCL Council in 1975, and became a fellow of UCL in 1979.

He became an Assistant Inspector of Taxes in 1934. He was a Deputy Chief Inspector of Taxes, 1964-1973, Chief Inspector of Taxes until 1975 then Director General until his retirement in 1977.

In 1975, he was made a Companion of the Order of the Bath. He was served as the Treasurer of the National Association for the Care of Offenders in 1979. From 1978, he was on the council of the London Welsh Trust (Vice-Chairman, 1981-1985). He was Honorary Treasurer of the Honourable Society of Cymmrodorion from 1980. He was a governor of the English-Speaking Union from 1978 and its deputy chairman from 1983 to 1986.

In May 1991, Inland Revenue named their Leeds office "Symons Building" in honour of Symons.

Following his death in 1990, Symons was buried at Penllwyn, Capel Bangor, Aberystwyth.
