= FDA (trade union) =

British trade union for civil servants

- Founded: 1919; 107 years ago
- Headquarters: Borough High Street, London, England
- Location: United Kingdom
- Members: ▲24,422 (2024)
- General Secretary: Dave Penman
- Affiliations: TUC, STUC, ICTU, Wales TUC, PSI
- Website: fda.org.uk

The FDA, formerly referred to the Association of First Division Civil Servants, is the only trade union that operates in the administrations of all four nations of the United Kingdom and focuses exclusively on issues of managers and professionals in public service. The membership ranges from Higher Executive Officers to Permanent Secretaries.

Since its formation in 1919, the union has grown to more than 24,000 members across England, Wales, Northern Ireland, and Scotland.

== Members, structure and affiliations ==
=== Members ===
Members of the FDA work across 200 government departments, agencies and arm's-length-bodies in England, Northern Ireland, Scotland, Wales and overseas.

Employers represented by the FDA include: HMRC, Foreign, Commonwealth and Development Office, Crown Prosecution Service, Department for Work and Pensions, Scottish Government, Government Legal Department, Welsh Government, culture including libraries, museums and more.

Its members include policy advisers, middle and senior managers, tax inspectors, economists, lawyers, prosecutors, school inspectors, diplomats, accountants, fast streamers and senior civil servants.

In 2002, MI6 partnered with the FDA to provide workplace support, guidance and legal advice to staff whilst maintaining their anonymity. While MI6 staff did not become full union members, the arrangement provided them with support in addressing workplace grievances and accessing legal advice, including cases taken to employment tribunals.

In 2015, the union expanded its membership base by opening up membership to HEOs, SEOs and their equivalent grades for the first time.

=== Membership structure and affiliations ===
Its federal structure means that some sections of the union operate under separate branding. Three parts of the union have distinctive institutional features. Senior staff at HM Revenue and Customs join the Association of Revenue and Customs (ARC) which is also a certified trade union as well as a section of FDA. Managers in the NHS join Managers in Partnership (MiP), a joint venture with Unison of which MiP members are also members. Members in middle management (Higher Executive Officer and Senior Executive Officers) join Keystone.

The FDA is an affiliate of the Trades Union Congress, the Scottish Trades Union Congress, the Wales TUC and the Irish Congress of Trade Unions but is not affiliated to the Labour Party or any other political party. The FDA is also affiliated to Public Services International.

=== Member support ===
The FDA provides workplace advice, representation and legal advice to managers and professionals in the civil service. The union provides support with workplace issues around pay, pensions, redundancy, discrimination, bullying, disciplinary charges, dismissal and more. Each civil service department has an allocated FDA rep who is the first point of contact for any member.

The FDA holds collective bargaining agreements with over 100 employers which allows them to negotiate on behalf of members pay, pensions, redundancy, quality and other issues.

Originally only representing a handful of the most senior civil servants in Whitehall, FDA membership is currently the highest in the union’s history at more than 24,000, and is spread across the UK. The union has seen more than 50% growth in membership over the last decade.

== History ==
The FDA formally came into being in January 1919.

In 1935, the FDA’s conference backed the campaign for equal pay for men and women civil servants.

In 1944, Alix Kilroy was elected as the first female chair of the union. In 1974, the FDA’s first full-time General Secretary, Norman Ellis, was appointed. In 1980, John Ward became the FDA's second General secretary. In 1989, Elizabeth Symons was elected to be General Secretary, followed by Jonathan Baume in 1997.

2002 saw the FDA affiliate with the Secret Intelligence Service (MI6) Staff Association.

In June 2005, FDA and Unison launched a joint venture called Managers in Partnership (MiP), which represents senior managers in the NHS.

In 2005, the FDA was at the forefront of the campaign to protect public sector pensions, which led to a government-union agreement in January 2007 on a joint approach to modernising pensions in the civil service.

In September 2008 agreement was reached with the Security Service (MI5) for the FDA to provide professional employee relations support to staff.

In April 2010, after a long campaign by the FDA, the civil service was put onto a statutory footing when the Constitutional Reform and Governance Act received Royal Assent.

Also in 2010, the union launched its successful Women into Leadership conference series, alongside Dods.

On 30 November 2011, FDA members across the UK took strike action over public sector pensions - the first national strike in the union’s history.

In May 2012, FDA members voted to accept the Government’s proposals for a new pension scheme from 2015, following a long period of particularly complex and difficult negotiations.

In 2012, former FDA Deputy General Secretary Dave Penman was elected to succeed Baume, and took up office in July 2012.

In spring 2013, the FDA launched its alternative White Paper ‘Delivering for the Nation: Securing a World-Class Civil Service’ in Parliament. The White Paper included the union’s analysis of the civil service challenges and recommendations for change.

At the 2015 Annual Delegate Conference, delegates voted to fully open up membership to HEO, SEO and related grades.

In 2019, the FDA celebrated its centenary. The union marked the occasion with a series of events across the UK, featuring speakers such as former Australian Prime Minister Julia Gillard, then Cabinet Secretary Sir Mark Sedwill and former Cabinet Secretary Lord O’Donnell.

In 2019, the FDA (in partnership with the Smith Institute), commissioned a report entitled ‘Impartiality in a post-truth world’. The report examined why impartiality is important for effective and efficient government.

In 2020, the FDA moved into its new home at Centenary House, 93-95 Borough High Street, which was formally opened by then TUC General Secretary Frances O’Grady. This marked the first time in its history that the FDA has owned its own head office building.

After years of campaigning, in June 2020, the House of Commons approved an historic motion to establish the new Independent Expert Panel (IEP) to deal with complaints of bullying, harassment and sexual harassment against MPs. Under the new policy – which is based on proposals put forward by FDA reps in the House of Commons branch – complaints, investigations and sanctions will be handled with complete independence from MPs.

At the Trades Union Congress in 2023, FDA General Secretary Dave Penman joined the TUC General Council’s Executive Committee for the first time. Through this role he works with colleagues from across the union movement to influence the priorities of the TUC and ensure the voices of FDA members are heard.

The following month, FDA General Secretary Dave Penman signed a new agreement with the Chief of the UK Secret Intelligence Service Richard Moore, ensuring the FDA would continue to provide advice and support for MI6 staff.

== Leadership ==
=== General secretary ===
Dave Penman, formerly deputy general secretary, was elected unopposed as general secretary in May 2012 and took up office from July 2012.

His immediate predecessors were Jonathan Baume (1997-2012) (who had previously been assistant general secretary and deputy general secretary), Elizabeth Symons (1989–96) and John Ward (1980–88). The first full-time general secretary was Norman Ellis, appointed in 1974.

In 1996, the then Labour Party leader Tony Blair was criticised after he nominated the outgoing FDA General Secretary Liz Symons for a peerage.

== See also ==
- British Civil Service
- Managers in Partnership (MIP)
- Trade Union
