= Dave Penman =

Scottish union leader

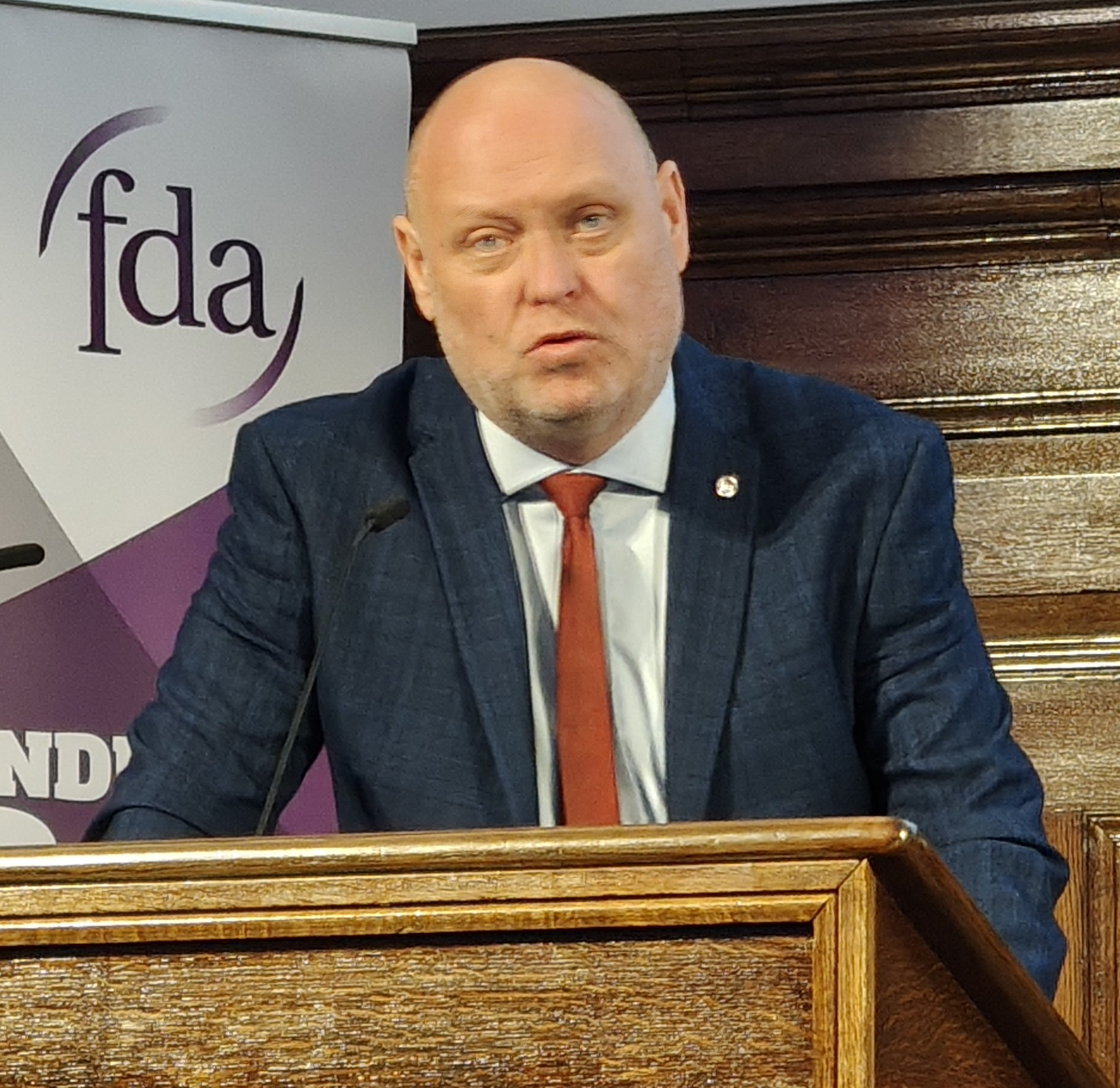
Penman at the FDA conference in 2025

Dave Penman (born 1966 or 1967) is a Scottish trade union leader who serves as general secretary of the FDA, a trade union for civil servants in the United Kingdom.

== Early career ==
Penman began working as an administrative assistant for the Inland Revenue in Cumbernauld at the age of eighteen. In 1986, he transferred to the Department for Work and Pensions, where he became an executive officer. He soon became active in the National Union of Civil and Public Servants (NUCPS), and from 1992 represented it on the general council of the Scottish Trades Union Congress, the first person to hold the "young workers" seat on the council.

== FDA career ==
In 1995, Penman began working full-time for the NUCPS as an organiser, then in 2000 he transferred to the FDA union, where he served as national officer. From 2002, he was the union's head of operations, and in 2011 he became its deputy general secretary.

Penman was elected as the union's general secretary in 2012. On election, he said that "you couldn’t put a cigarette paper between myself and [his predecessor] Jonathan [Baume] in terms of our approach to trade unionism", and identified the union's key challenge as maintaining pay and conditions to prevent a brain drain from the senior civil service. Since September 2012, he had also served on the General Council of the Trades Union Congress. Penman was re-elected in 2016 for a further five-year term.

As general secretary, the FDA launched a legal challenge to Prime Minister Boris Johnson's decision not to sack Home Secretary Priti Patel after reports of bullying. The FDA argued that Johnson misinterpreted the definition of bullying in the workplace, and that Patel's presence in the role was detrimental to civil servants. In December 2021, the FDA lost the legal battle, with Penman stating "[w]hilst we are disappointed in the final judgment, there is a lot here that helps us protect civil servants from the conduct of ministers."

In November 2022, Penman stated that several ministers under Sunak have bullied civil servants, that bullying has been a problem under successive governments, that civil servants have resigned because they felt they could do nothing about it. Penman urged Rishi Sunak to reform the complaints system to help sort out a "toxic work culture" in Whitehall.

== Personal life ==
In his spare time, Penman supports Partick Thistle F.C. and enjoys crime fiction and the theatre.

Trade union offices
Preceded by Jonathan Baume	General Secretary of the FDA; 2012–present	Succeeded by Incumbent
