= John Ward (economist) =

Christopher John William Ward (born 21 June 1942) is an economist, an opera administrator and trade union leader who served as General Secretary of the First Division Association from 1980 to 1988.

He was educated at Oundle School, Corpus Christi College, Oxford (BA Lit Hum) and the University of East Anglia (DipEcon).

== Career ==
In 1983, Ward stood to become General Secretary of the National and Local Government Officers' Association, but was narrowly defeated by John Daly.

- Bank of England, 1965–74
- General Secretary, Bank of England Staff Organisation, 1974–80
- General Secretary, First Division Association, 1980–88
- Head of development, Opera North, 1988–94
- Director of corporate affairs, West Yorkshire Playhouse, 1994–97
- Director of development, English National Opera 1997-2002
- Director of development, Crafts Council 2003-04
- Development advisor, Welsh National Opera 2003-

He was chairman of Swindon Supporters in London, 1987–88.

Trade union offices
Preceded by Norman Ellis	General Secretary of the First Division Association; 1980–1988	Succeeded by Elizabeth Symons
