= Tobi Adegboyega =

Nigerian UK-based pastor (born 1980)

Pastor Tobi Adegboyega
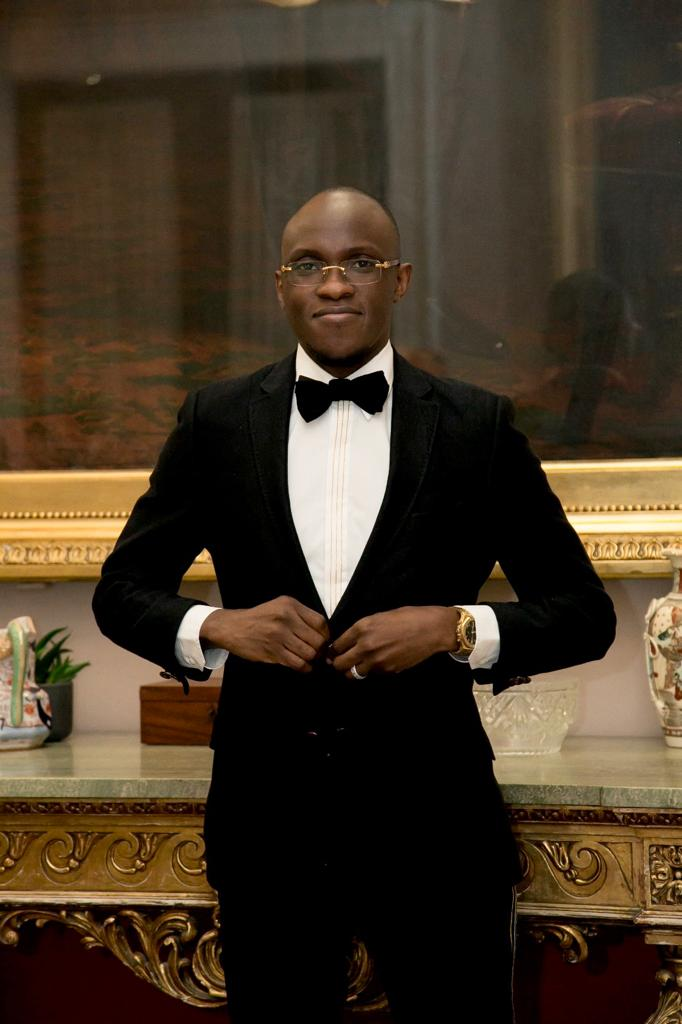
- Born: Tobi Adegboyega; November 11, 1980 (age 45); Ibadan, Oyo State, Nigeria
- Education: Ogun State University
- Occupations: Pastor, televangelist
- Title: Founder of SPAC Nation
- Partner: Lucy Oluwatosin Odetola (m. 2011)
- Website: www.spacnxtionfamily.co.uk

Tobi Adegboyega (born 11 November 1980) is a high-profile Individual. He is the founder of the Salvation Proclaimers Anointed Church (SPAC Nation), now, the Nxtion Family following ongoing legal cases.

== Early life ==
Tobi Adegboyega moved to London from Lagos, Nigeria in 2005 via a tourist visa. On arrival in London, he shared a room with his cousin John Boyega, whilst once working as a kitchen porter. They are both Yoruba by tribe.

== Career ==
Adegboyega started his former church SPAC Nation in 2008, with three members. The church was based in Croydon, south London. As pastor, he would encourage criminals to drop their weapons at the altar of his church during services, an act that received both praise and criticism from the public. On 20 May 2020, Adegboyega reportedly stepped down as Lead Pastor of SPAC Nation and handed over the church to Samuel Akokhia, two years prior to its closure. The announcement was then made via the church's official Twitter handle.

He has invested in the various interests of the young people he meets from the arts, politics, STEM, fashion and academia. Students from disadvantaged backgrounds, aspiring to attend Russell Group and Ivy League universities like Harvard, Cambridge and Imperial College were supported by grant-funding aiding them in their fees and living costs during their studies.

== Controversies ==
A BBC Panorama investigation accused Adegboyega and other leaders of the church of financially exploiting members of the church. Panorama interviewed members who made accusations of the church, and suggested Adegboyega be held accountable.

Panorama later released a video of Adegboyega, quoted as saying he believed it was "no big deal for members of the church to give at least £1,000 a month to the church", and that he needed to make £1 million monthly. A member of the church, Nino, claimed he was asked for £20,000 by Adegboyega, who said he needed it for an investment. While the church denied these allegations, Adegboyega declined an interview with Panorama.

In January 2020, his church was accused of financial exploitation and fraud by Croydon North MP Steve Reed, but as of February 2020, the police have said that they would not launch a criminal enquiry.

Many other allegations of financial misappropriation, fraud, domestic abuse, sexual abuse have been raised against his church, SPAC Nation and pastors of the church.

In 2019, SPAC Nation was accused of pressuring youths to sell blood.

Despite these allegations and claims, in February 2020, the Metropolitan Police stated that it had dropped its criminal case against SPAC Nation after finding no criminal acts of fraud or other offences.

The Metropolitan Police told HuffPost: “Officers from central specialist crime carried out a review to identify if any criminal offences had been committed. The review is now complete and no criminal investigation has been launched into these specific allegations.”

The Metropolitan Police confirmed that numerous people did not respond despite several requests to contact the police.

The Metropolitan Police stated that officers had made efforts to contact all potential informants, including individuals who had reportedly communicated with a local Member of Parliament.

The Metropolitan Police also stated that some of the information provided to third parties was not corroborated during police interviews with potential witnesses or victims. They declared they would review their investigation if any further information came to light.

In June 2022, Adegboyega's SPAC Nation church was ordered to shut down for good by the U.K. government, after failing to properly account for more than £1.87 million of outgoings and operating with a lack of transparency.

== Philanthropy ==
Alongside the church's dissolution for fraud by the U.K. High Court and Insolvency Service, and clear evidence of the "large" lifestyle of Adegboyega, a lifestyle including a mansion, and expensive cars, jewelry, and clothing, there are a variety of reports of Adegboyega's charitable efforts (many in Nigerian news sources, and at least some arising from his own statements about his intended actions).

In 2018, BBC's Victoria Derbyshire programme reported on SPAC Nation, noting that Adegboyega had 14 ex-criminals living with him. It was said that at the release of these convicts from prison, he takes them in to make sure they do not fall back to crime, and that he encourages former gang members to drop their weapons at the altar during services.

In 2019, Adegboyega announced to a news website in Nigeria "his readiness to fight poverty among youths in Lagos State with creation of jobs through the waste management business", indicating his intent to "create thousands of jobs within 24 months in Lagos by investing money in generating over 54 million tons of waste in the state alone".

== Personal life ==
Adegboyega lives in a £2.5 million mansion in Surrey. In a 2020 interview, he stated he had been married for eight years.
