= Methylation induced premeiotically =

Process in molecular biology

In molecular biology, methylation induced premeiotically (MIP) is a process by which cytosines within repeated DNA sequences are de novo methylated prior to the sexual cycle. This process was first described in the ascomycete Ascobolus immersens. MIP is dependent upon the gene masc1 which encodes a cytosine methyltransferase-like protein. At least one major function of the process appears to be genome defense. Related functions have been found in other fungi, including Neurospora and Aspergillus species.
