= Managers in Partnership =

Managers in Partnership (MIP) is the only trade union in the United Kingdom that focuses exclusively on issues that affect managers and other senior staff in health and care services.

The union was set up in 2005 as a joint venture between UNISON and the FDA. Since its formation, the union has grown to over 9,000 members UK-wide.

== Members ==
MiP represents managers working in the NHS, social care and the private sector throughout England, Scotland, Wales and Northern Ireland. Employers represented by MiP include NHS trusts and providers, NHS arm’s length bodies, NHS commissioning bodies, social care providers and private healthcare services.

All NHS staff on or above Band 8a are eligible for MiP membership. This includes Heads of Service, Project Managers, Clinical Managers, Estates and Finance Managers, Directors and Chief Executives. Most staff in social care and private healthcare providers with a line management responsibility are eligible for MiP membership.

=== Member support ===
MiP provides workplace advice, representation and legal advice to healthcare managers. The union provides support with workplace issues around pay, pensions, redundancy, discrimination, bullying, disciplinary charges, dismissal and more.

MiP members are supported by a UK network of National Officers and Workplace Reps in addition to a head office team based in London.

=== Membership fees ===
MiP subscription rates are determined by salary and grade. Membership fees start at £20.85 per month for part time workers earning up to £25,570 annually.

Members of the NHS Graduate Management Trainee Scheme pay a £10 annual fee for the duration of their time on the scheme. Members who retire may retain a retired membership with either of MiP’s partner unions UNISON or the FDA.

Memberships are paid either directly by or direct debit or by what is commonly known as "check-off" or DOCAS (Deduction of Contributions at Source). This is where the employer deducts the contribution from the employee's salary on behalf of the union.

=== Membership numbers ===
In 2005, MiP launched with 4,000 members, with three-quarters inherited from Unison and the rest from the FDA's health section. Since 2026, MiP has grown to over 9,000 members who work across the healthcare sector in the UK.
