= Mitochondrial intermediate peptidase =

Class of enzymes

Identifiers
- EC no.: 3.4.24.59
- CAS no.: 136447-30-8

Databases
- IntEnz: IntEnz view
- BRENDA: BRENDA entry
- ExPASy: NiceZyme view
- KEGG: KEGG entry
- MetaCyc: metabolic pathway
- PRIAM: profile
- PDB structures: RCSB PDB PDBe PDBsum
Search
- PMC: articles
- PubMed: articles
- NCBI: proteins

Mitochondrial intermediate peptidase (EC 3.4.24.59, mitochondrial intermediate precursor-processing proteinase, MIP) is an enzyme. This enzyme catalyses the following chemical reaction

Release of an N-terminal octapeptide as second stage of processing of some proteins imported into the mitochondrion

This enzyme is a homologue of thimet oligopeptidase.
