= SPAC Nation =

South London-based Christian organisation

Salvation Proclaimers Anointed Church, SPAC Nation or SPAC Nation Ministries is a South London-based evangelical Pentecostal Christian organisation. In June 2020, SPAC renamed itself to the NXTION Family, the name under which it continues to operate. SPAC has been described as a form of prosperity gospel, believing that faith in God will bring material wealth.

SPAC was a black-majority church, and most people that attend its Sunday services are under the age of 30. Sunday services are often held in various high-end locations, such as hotels, rather than a specific church building or location. In 2018, the church had a reported £1.17 million in income and £1.19 million in expenditure. This was a rise from £164,000 income reported in 2016.

In 2016, the church reported having less than 300 members; two years later, this has increased to a reported membership of over 1,000. In 2020, it was reported that the SPAC's congregation had up to 2,000 members. A 2019 report stated the church had been in contact with 1,200 people between the ages of 12–30. In 2022, it was reported that, during an investigation by the Insolvency Service, it was found that SPAC failed to provide supporting evidence to the self-reported number of over 2,000 members. In December 2019, it was reported that SPAC operated across 12 London boroughs, as well as Leicester and Birmingham.

The SPAC has been the subject of multiple accusations of fraud and financial exploitation of members. The BBC reported in November 2020 that pastor and self-styled entrepreneur Mariam Mbula was a "career con artist" who had been imprisoned in several European countries. According to the report, while SPAC Nation claims to be helping disadvantaged young people, former members said that its leaders, including Mbula, encourage young congregants to take out loans and give huge sums to the church. The police were carrying out a criminal investigation about allegations of fraud and other offences connected with people associated with SPAC Nation.

== History ==
=== Early history ===
SPAC Nation was founded in 2008 by Tobi Adegboyega (commonly referred to as Pastor Tobi), and was officially incorporated as a charity in 2012. The church is reported to have been founded in Peckham.

From 2017 to 2018, SPAC was praised by various media, community workers, police officials, and local government for encouraging young people to abandon crime and gangs and to set themselves onto a better path. Politicians from both the Conservative Party and Labour Party also praised the church. The church was noted for using ex-gang members to show younger people a different path in life they could take. The church encouraged members to give up any weapons they had, to some success. These weapons were later given to the police by the church. SPAC reported that 55% of people that attended had previously been involved in some form of crime. The church was noted for attracting young members through music (such as rap and R&B) and a 'designer aesthetic'. Pastors are often pictured in designer clothes and high-end vehicles. Senior pastors are addressed as 'Sir' or 'Ma' by other members.

SPAC created 'safe houses', also nicknamed 'trap houses' (short for 'Take Risks and Prosper', a co-opting of the American slang 'trap house', meaning 'drug house'), for members of the church to live in. These houses were intended to keep them away from crime and around people involved in the church.

A rap group, called Hope Dealers, was created. They performed every Sunday for the church and rapped about topics such as salvation and redemption. The group co-opted UK drill, a genre typically associated with violence and gangsterism, and instead used primarily Christian-based lyrics. This fusion was dubbed 'gospel drill'. The intent was to appeal to young people involved in gangs to quit and join the church.

In July 2019, SPAC announced it was investing £100,000 into youth start-ups.

In October 2019, SPAC Nation pastor Enrique Uwadiae was listed as one of 'London's Most Influential People' by the Evening Standard. Reggie Yates filmed a documentary on SPAC in September for MTV. The documentary showcased Hope Dealers, and interviews with Tobi Adegboyega from the church, as well as critics. It was however later criticised by HuffPost for not probing the church strongly enough.

=== Scandals ===
In November 2019, it was reported that the Metropolitan Police were investigating the church for allegations of fraud and 'other possible offences'. The church was accused of pressuring young members into donating thousands in donations, including by taking out loans to put it into the church – some without the consent or knowledge of the member involved. Parents of young members suggested it operated "like a cult". A representative from the church stated that they do "not condone any illegality of any leader or individual" from the church. One member alleged she was encouraged to commit benefits fraud for the church. Some funds were funnelled into companies owned by high-ranking associates of the church, such as E. R. Management Group, as opposed to directly into the church. Tkay, a member of Hope Dealers, a rap group that was associated with the church, also corroborated these rumours and denounced the church after leaving. Other members were pressured to donate blood for money that they would then donate to the church. While initially encouraged, Pastor Tobi put a stop to the practice. However, previously he was quoted in a live Periscope as stating "I don't care what you guys have to do to raise your seed – you're going to raise it" ("seed" is an internal phrase meaning "raising money").

A clash between SPAC members and members of a counter-protest group named 'Let The Youngers Go', led by former SPAC member Tkay, occurred in Croydon. The group claimed to be 'victims' of SPAC.

The praise that was initially given to the church was criticised in 2019 following the investigations. Police were criticised by Steve Reed, Labour shadow minister for child protection, for not acting on complaints earlier. Reed claimed girls under 18 had been pressured to have sex with members of the church that were over 18. Steve Reed further suggested that criticising SPAC Nation, an organisation that was helping to deal with the rise in knife crime in London, was for some not "convenient". The praise, the Huff Post reported, helped legitimise the church and shield them from criticism. A mother of a former member of the church stated, "Our belief is because 98% of the congregation are black children, that is why the police have done nothing. If it was white children in this group they would shut it down right now".

The safe houses set up by the church were also criticised for leaving young people vulnerable to exploitation and abuse. At least one 16-year old was sexually abused in a safe house. SPAC released a statement saying they encouraged the girl to report the incident to the police. Another incident involved a SPAC pastor, Enrique Uwadiae, whipping a young man with a belt while reciting a bible verse. This was later dismissed as a 'joke' by the church. The church distanced itself from the safe houses, stating they were set-up by individuals, however, on social media they were referred to as SPAC houses. One senior pastor, Mariam Mbula (also known as Mariam Mola or Nopapa Mbula), was subject to a BBC documentary entitled 'Catch Her If You Can', which touched on her activities within SPAC and previous fraud activities. She operated a safe house and pressured young women in her safe house to hand her control over their finances.

The Guardian reported that the church supported the British Conservative Party. Jayde Edwards, a pastor from the church, ran for a council by-election representing the Conservative Party. This caught the ire of the Charity Commission in 2019, as registered charities are not permitted to support political candidates.

Parliamentarians in the House of Commons called for a full police inquiry. In February 2020, Scotland Yard announced it would not be launching a criminal investigation into SPAC Nation following a review of allegations. In response, SPAC stated, "We believe the police have come to a fair conclusion following their enquiry". Some former members of SPAC criticised the decision, stating that the police had not spoken to all alleged witnesses.

=== Rebranding ===
In June 2020, it was announced SPAC was renaming itself to 'the NXTION Family'.

In May 2020, head of the church Pastor Tobi Adegboyega stepped down from his position. He was replaced by senior pastor Samuel Akokhia who is to lead the church. In a video announcing he was leaving, he stated, "do not let people take advantage. Cheap tabloids will have no relevance until they speak negative because they know that negative news sells." It was unclear if Tobi was completely stepping down from his duties, or merely from his position. He stated he was still "leading the church"; however, this was contradicted in a press release which stated he had stepped down from all of his leadership roles. He has since been referred to as a 'church leader' in later media reports.

In December, police investigations associated with the fraud allegations led to an arrest of a 40 year-old male. Earlier in May, a 24 year-old male was also arrested and police raided six houses, all of which were used as SPAC safe houses. These both were the result of fresh allegations originating in February 2020. Police stated these related to individual crimes, and were not targeted at the organisation as a whole.

=== Insolvency ===
In June 2022, it was reported that SPAC Nation had been found insolvent following an investigation by the Insolvency Service and forced to shut down. (Note: This does not necessarily prevent SPAC from officially rebranding and re-registering under a new name.) SPAC was deemed to have suspicious or incorrect accounting records, which failed to support its claims of donations or alleged expenditure. SPAC was found to have submitted inconsistent information to both the Insolvency Service and the Charity Commission.

Following the news, Pastor Tobi announced the formation of new church groups, the Freedxm church and the Influxnce church. Despite the 2022 insolvency, the church has also continued to operate using the NXTION Family name.
