= List of diplomatic visits to the United States from Oceania =

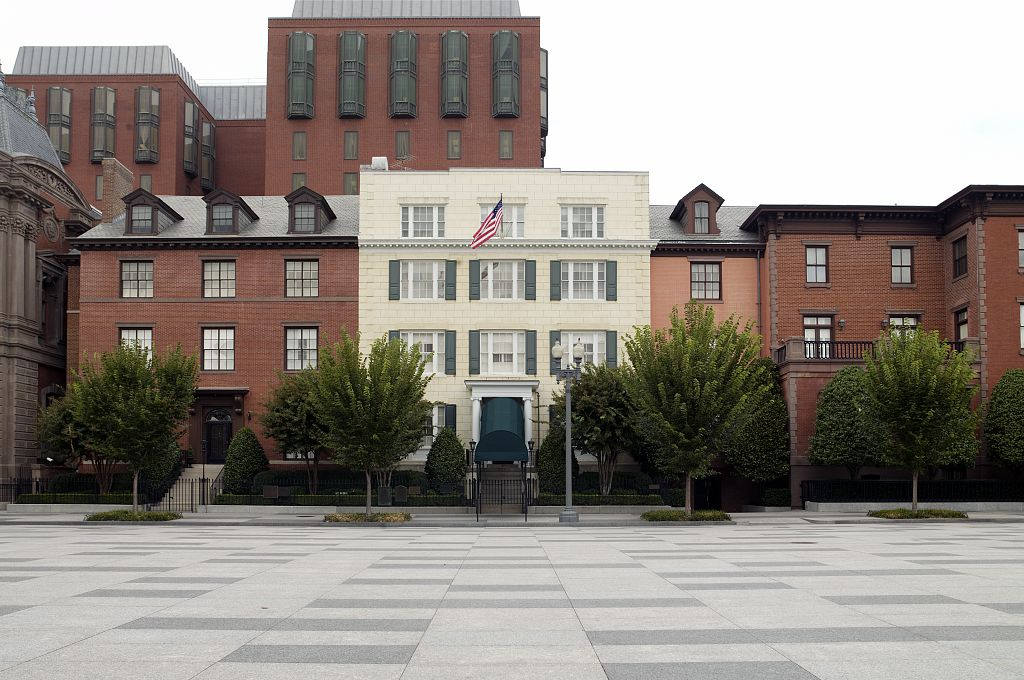
The President's Guest House, commonly known as Blair House has been the official guest house of visiting dignitaries in Washington D.C. since 1824

International trips made by the heads of state and heads of government to the United States have become a valuable part of American diplomacy and international relations since such trips were first made in the mid-19th century. They are complicated undertakings that often require months of planning along with a great deal of coordination and communication.

The first international visit to the United States was made by King Kalakaua of Hawaii in 1874, which was the first visit by a foreign chief of state or head of government.

== Australia ==
Table of Trips
Start	End	Guest	Title	Reason
May 27, 1918	May 30, 1918	Billy Hughes	Prime Minister	Met with President Wilson en route to Imperial Conference meetings in London. Arrived in U.S. May 13; visited New York City.
July 8, 1935	July 9, 1935	Joseph Lyons	Prime Minister	Discussed economic policy while returning from Great Britain. Arrived in U.S. July 7, visited New York City
August 22, 1938	August 23, 1938	Alexander Hore-Ruthven	Governor General	
May 9, 1941	May 12, 1941	Robert Menzies	Prime Minister	For a series of conferences on economic relations.
April 23, 1944	April 29, 1944	John Curtin	Prime Minister	Guest of U.S. Government en route to London for a conference of British Commonwealth Prime Ministers. Arrived in U.S. April 19. Revisited U.S. June 2–6 on return.
May 6, 1946	May 10, 1946	Ben Chifley	Prime Minister	Guest of U.S. Government on return from Conference of Commonwealth Prime Ministers in London.
July 27, 1950	August 3, 1950	Robert Menzies	Prime Minister	Met with President Truman en route to London.
May 16, 1952	May 21, 1952	Robert Menzies	Prime Minister	Informal discussions en route to London.
December 17, 1952	December 17, 1952	Robert Menzies	Prime Minister	Met with President-elect Eisenhower in New York City.
March 13, 1955	March 20, 1955	Robert Menzies	Prime Minister	Official visit. In New York City March 5–9; visited Canada March 9–13. Addressed U.S. Congress March 16. Private visit after March 17.
July 31, 1956	August 5, 1956	Robert Menzies	Prime Minister	Unofficial visit following Commonwealth Prime Ministers' Conference in London. In New York City July 21–26.
September 14, 1956	September 15, 1956	Robert Menzies	Prime Minister	Discussed the Suez Crisis with President Eisenhower and senior U.S. officials.
October 1, 1960	October 2, 1960	Robert Menzies	Prime Minister	Met with President Eisenhower; discussed East-West disarmament talks
February 24, 1961	February 24, 1961	Robert Menzies	Prime Minister	Informal visit; discussed Laos crisis with President Kennedy. In U.S. February 22–27.
June 17, 1962	June 20, 1962	Robert Menzies	Prime Minister	Informal visit. In the U.S. June 14–21; visited New York City and San Francisco.
September 24, 1962	September 26, 1962	Robert Menzies	Prime Minister	Informal visit while attending UN General Assembly.
July 8, 1963	July 10, 1963	Robert Menzies	Prime Minister	Informal visit. Arrived in U.S. July 2, visited New York City and Charlottesville (Virginia).
June 6, 1965	June 9, 1965	Robert Menzies	Prime Minister	Informal visit. Afterwards visited New York City. Departed U.S. June 13.
July 6, 1965	July 6, 1965	Robert Menzies	Prime Minister	Met informally with President Johnson while returning from Commonwealth Prime Ministers' Conference in London.
June 28, 1966	June 29, 1966	Harold Holt	Prime Minister	Informal visit while en route to London. Also visited New York City. Departed U.S. July 6
July 13, 1966	July 14, 1966	Harold Holt	Prime Minister	Informal visit during return trip from London.
June 1, 1967	June 2, 1967	Harold Holt	Prime Minister	Official visit.
May 26, 1968	May 28, 1968	John Gorton	Prime Minister	Official visit. In U.S. May 23–31; visited Honolulu, San Francisco, and New York City
May 5, 1969	May 8, 1969	John Gorton	Prime Minister	Official visit. In U.S. May 1–8; visited Williamsburg.
October 30, 1971	November 4, 1971	William McMahon	Prime Minister	Informal visit. Met with President Nixon November 2.
July 30, 1973	July 30, 1973	Edward Gough Whitlam	Prime Minister	Private visit while en route to Commonwealth meeting in Canada.
October 4, 1974	October 4, 1974	Edward Gough Whitlam	Prime Minister	Private visit.
May 7, 1975	May 7, 1975	Edward Gough Whitlam	Prime Minister	Private visit.
July 27, 1976	July 29, 1976	John Malcolm Fraser	Prime Minister	Official visit. Afterwards made a Private visit to New York City and Boston.
June 21, 1977	June 23, 1977	John Malcolm Fraser	Prime Minister	Official visit. Private visit to New York City afterwards.
January 1, 1979	January 3, 1979	John Malcolm Fraser	Prime Minister	Private visit. Met with President Carter January 2.
January 31, 1980	January 31, 1980	John Malcolm Fraser	Prime Minister	Private visit while en route to Europe. Met again with President Carter February 7, on return.
June 29, 1981	July 1, 1981	John Malcolm Fraser	Prime Minister	Official visit.
May 16, 1982	May 18, 1982	John Malcolm Fraser	Prime Minister	Private visit. Met with President Reagan May 17
June 11, 1983	June 15, 1983	Robert J. L. Hawke	Prime Minister	Official Working Visit. Private visit to New York City afterward.
February 5, 1985	February 7, 1985	Robert J. L. Hawke	Prime Minister	Official Working Visit. Private visit to New York City afterward.
April 15, 1986	April 18, 1986	Robert J. L. Hawke	Prime Minister	Official Working Visit.
June 22, 1988	June 24, 1988	Robert J. L. Hawke	Prime Minister	Official Working Visit. Addressed joint meeting of U.S. Congress June 23.Private visit to Texas afterward.
June 24, 1989	June 27, 1989	Robert J. L. Hawke	Prime Minister	Official visit.
September 12, 1993	September 15, 1993	Paul Keating	Prime Minister	Met with President Clinton during a Private visit.
November 18, 1993	November 21, 1993	Paul Keating	Prime Minister	Attended APEC meeting in Seattle.
July 9, 1999	July 13, 1999	John Howard	Prime Minister	Working Visit.
September 8, 2001	September 12, 2001	John Howard	Prime Minister	Official Working Visit (curtailed due to September 11 attacks. Commemorated the 50th anniversary of the ANZUS Treaty.
June 11, 2002	June 13, 2002	John Howard	Prime Minister	Addressed a Joint Session of Congress.
February 8, 2003	February 10, 2003	John Howard	Prime Minister	Working Visit.
May 1, 2003	May 3, 2003	John Howard	Prime Minister	Official select visit at Crawford, Texas.
June 2, 2004	June 4, 2004	John Howard	Prime Minister	Working Visit.
July 17, 2005	July 19, 2005	John Howard	Prime Minister	Working Visit.
May 12, 2006	May 17, 2006	John Howard	Prime Minister	Official visit.
March 27, 2008	April 1, 2008	Kevin Rudd	Prime Minister	Working Visit.
November 14, 2008	November 15, 2008	Kevin Rudd	Prime Minister	Attended the G-20 Economic Summit Meeting.
March 24, 2009	March 24, 2009	Kevin Rudd	Prime Minister	Working Visit.
September 24, 2009	September 25, 2009	Kevin Rudd	Prime Minister	Attended the G-20 Economic Summit in Pittsburgh.
November 30, 2009	November 30, 2009	Kevin Rudd	Prime Minister	Working Visit.
March 7, 2011	March 7, 2011	Julia Gillard	Prime Minister	Working Visit. Addressed a Joint Meeting of Congress.
November 10, 2011	November 13, 2011	Julia Gillard	Prime Minister	Attended the Asia-Pacific Economic and Cooperation Summit at Honolulu and Kapolei, Hawaii.
May 20, 2012	May 21, 2012	Julia Gillard	Prime Minister	Attended the NATO Summit Meeting in Chicago.
June 12, 2014	June 12, 2014	Tony Abbott	Prime Minister	Working Visit.
January 19, 2016	January 19, 2016	Malcolm Turnbull	Prime Minister	Working Lunch.
September 19, 2016	September 19, 2016	Malcolm Turnbull	Prime Minister	Met with President Obama at the UN General Assembly meeting in New York City.
May 4, 2017	May 4, 2017	Malcolm Turnbull	Prime Minister	Met with President Trump at the U.S.S. Intrepid Museum in New York City.
February 21, 2018	February 24, 2018	Malcolm Turnbull	Prime Minister	Official Working Visit.
December 5, 2018	December 5, 2018	Peter Cosgrove	Governor General	Attended the state funeral of former president George H. W. Bush.
September 19, 2019	September 22, 2019	Scott Morrison	Prime Minister	Official Visit.
September 21, 2021	September 21, 2021	Scott Morrison	Prime Minister	Working Visit.
September 24, 2021	September 24, 2021	Scott Morrison	Prime Minister	Working Visit; Quad Leaders' Summit.
March 13, 2023	March 13, 2023	Anthony Albanese	Prime Minister	Attended AUKUS Summit at Point Loma, California.
October 25, 2023	October 25, 2023	Anthony Albanese	Prime Minister	Official Visit.
November 12, 2023	November 17, 2023	Anthony Albanese	Prime Minister	Attended the APEC Leaders' Summit at San Francisco, California.
September 21, 2024	September 21, 2024	Anthony Albanese	Prime Minister	Attended Quad Leaders' Summit in Claymont, Delaware.

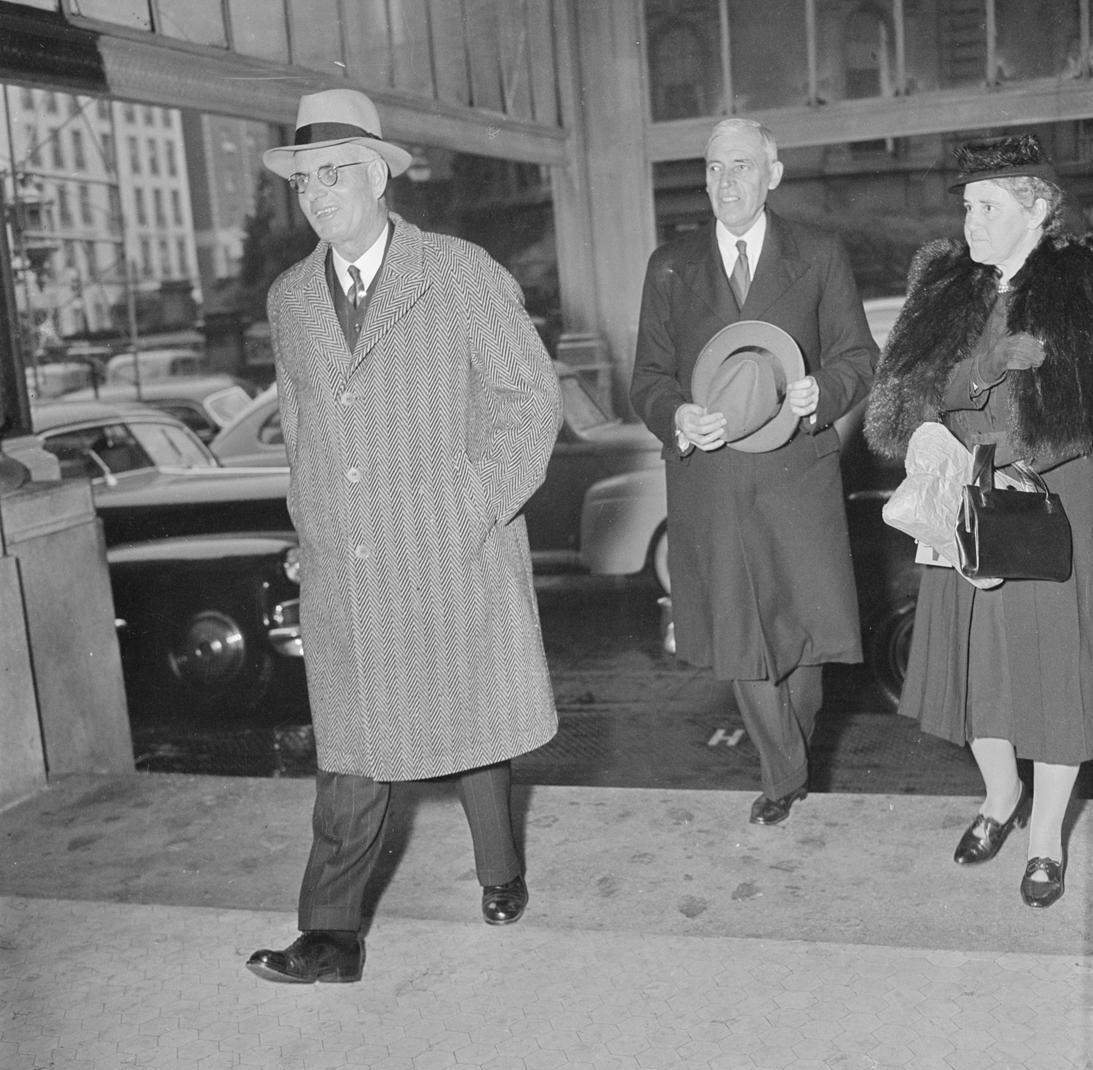

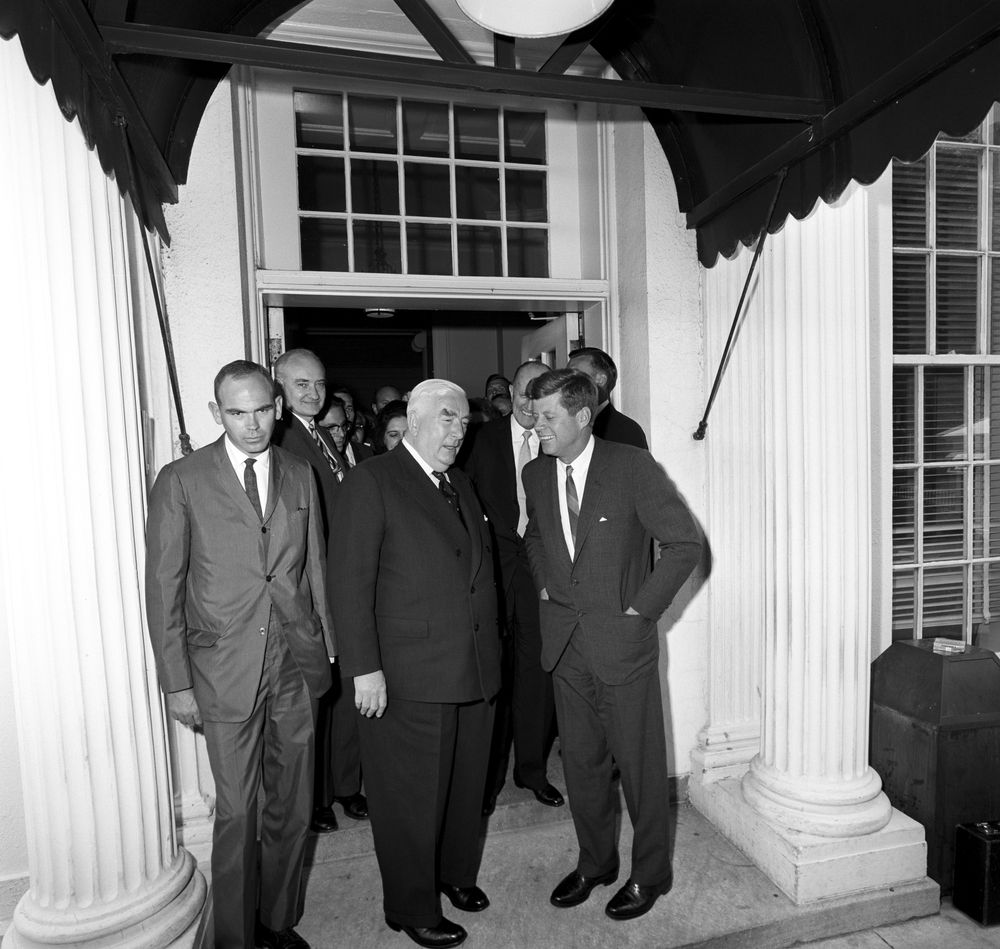

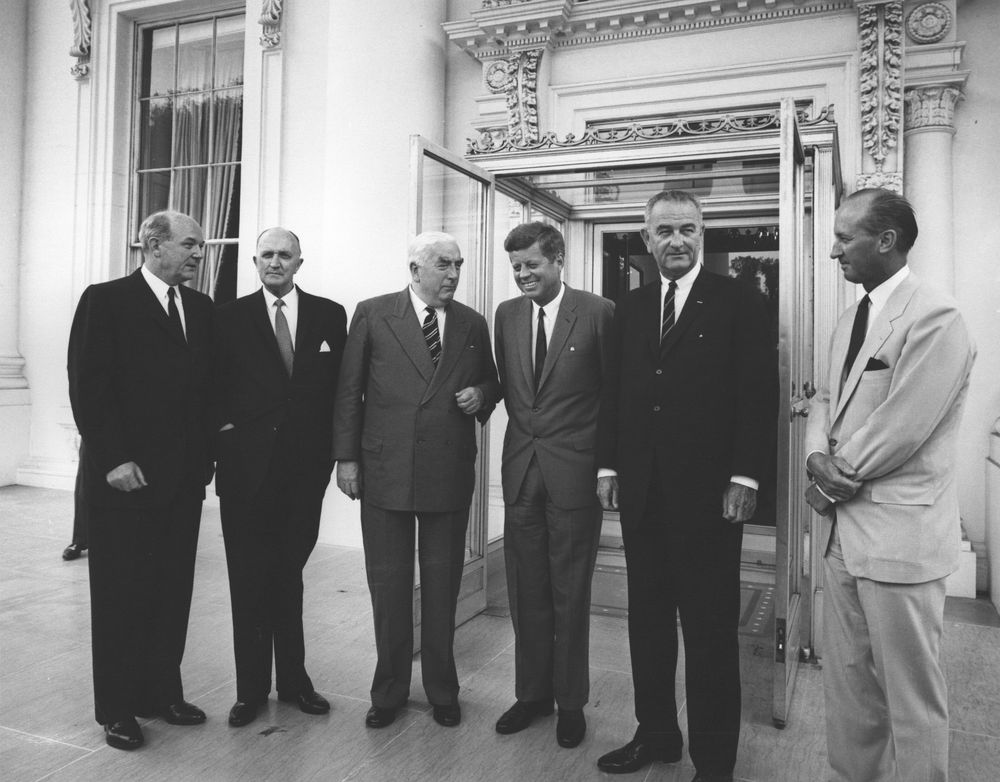

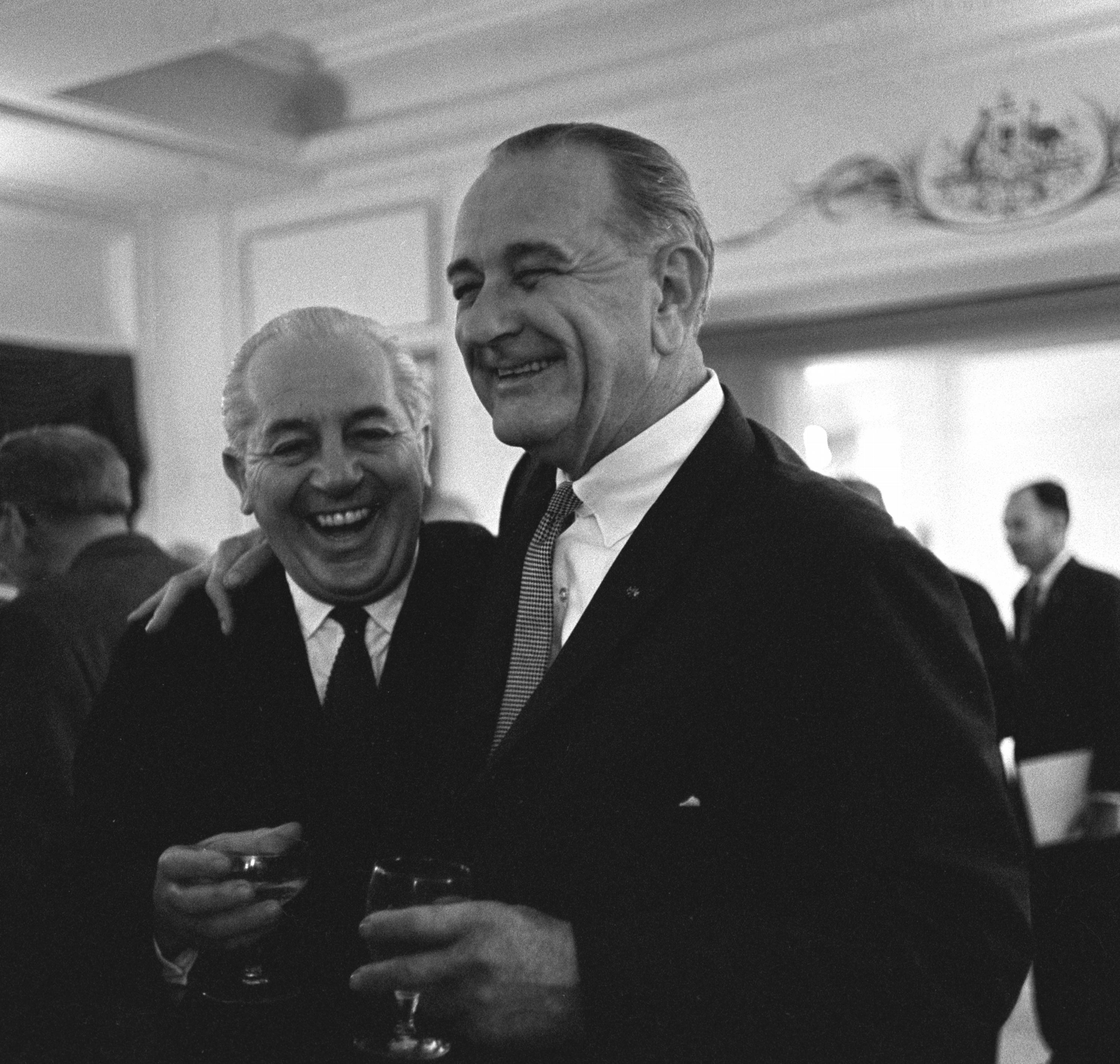

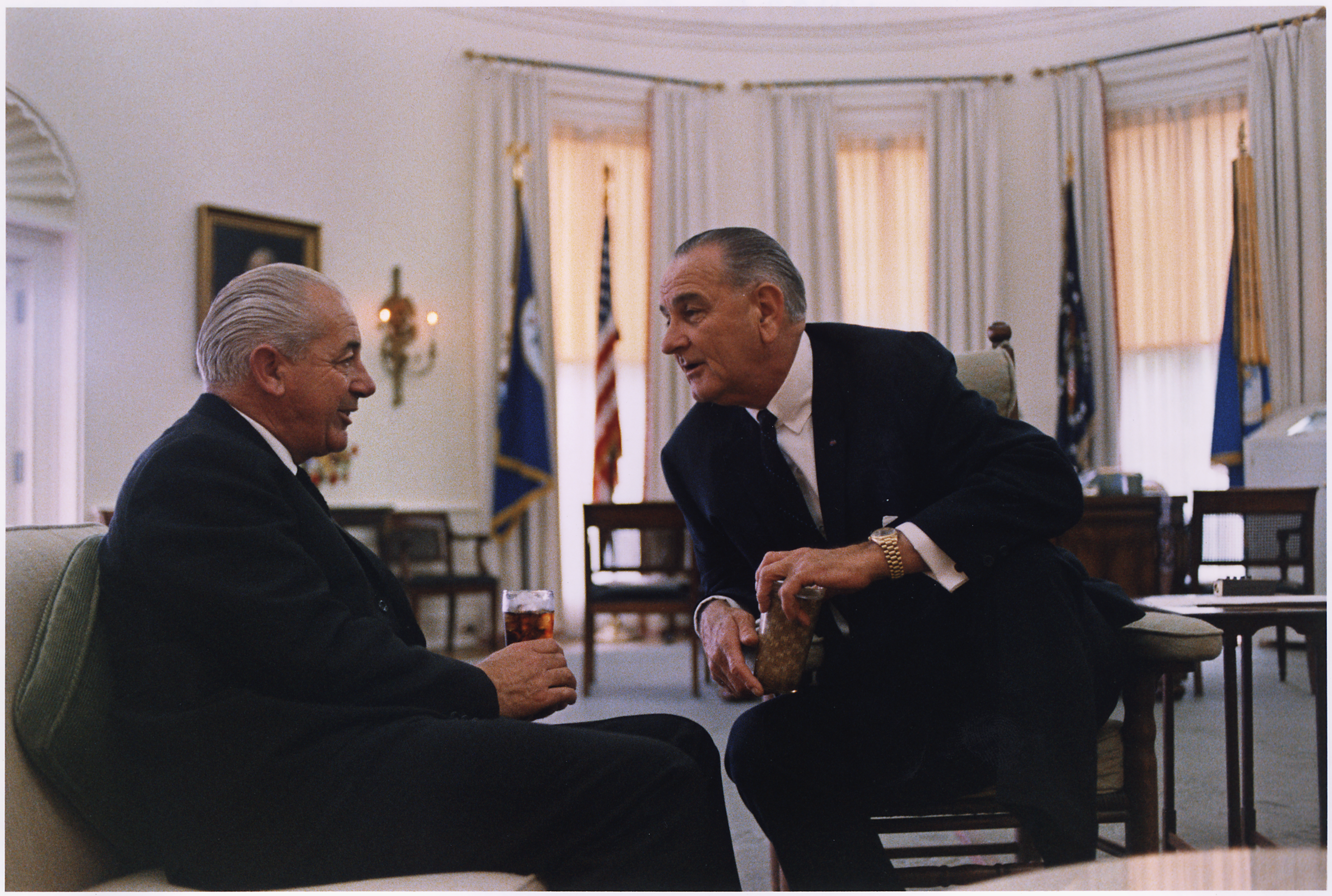

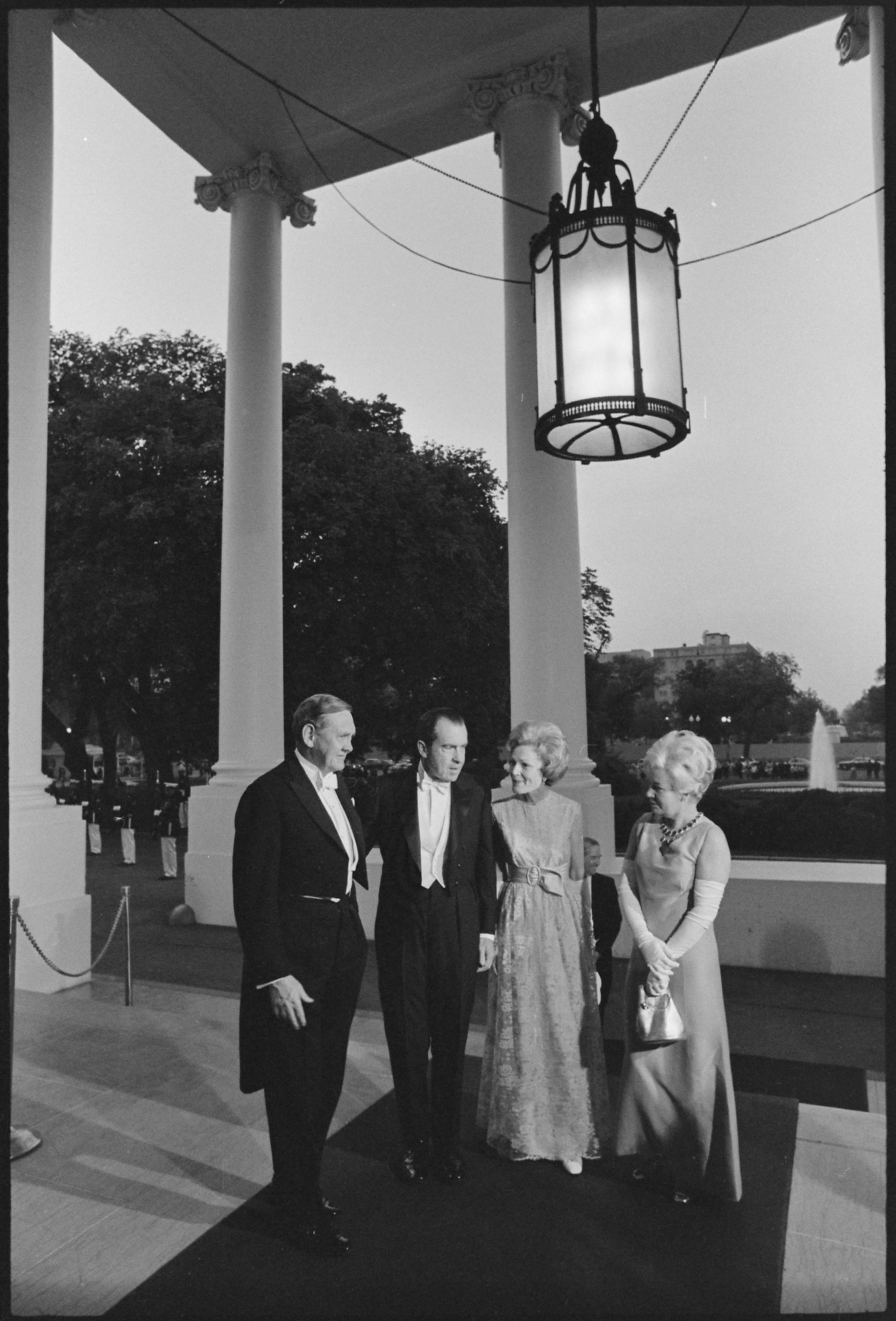

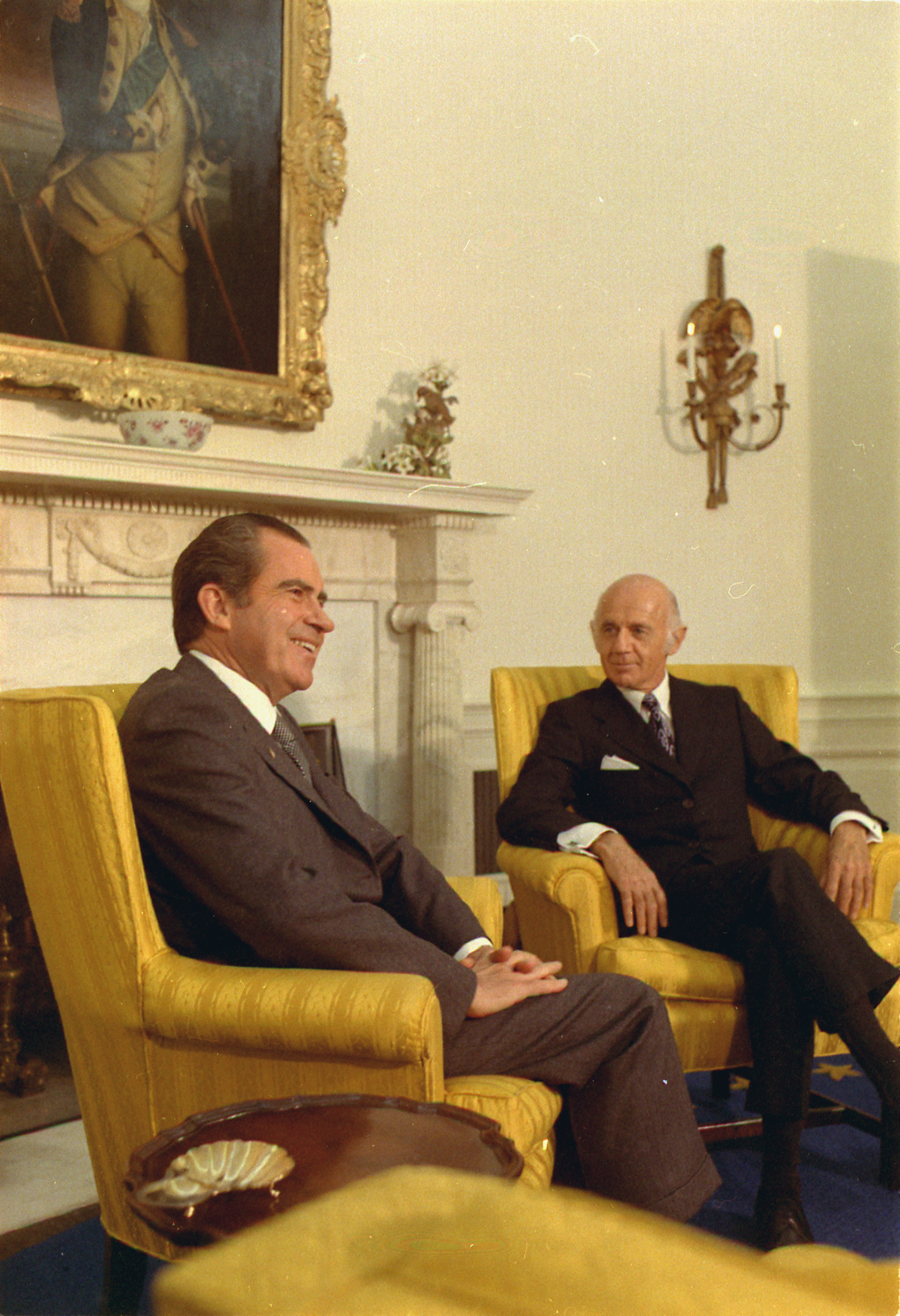

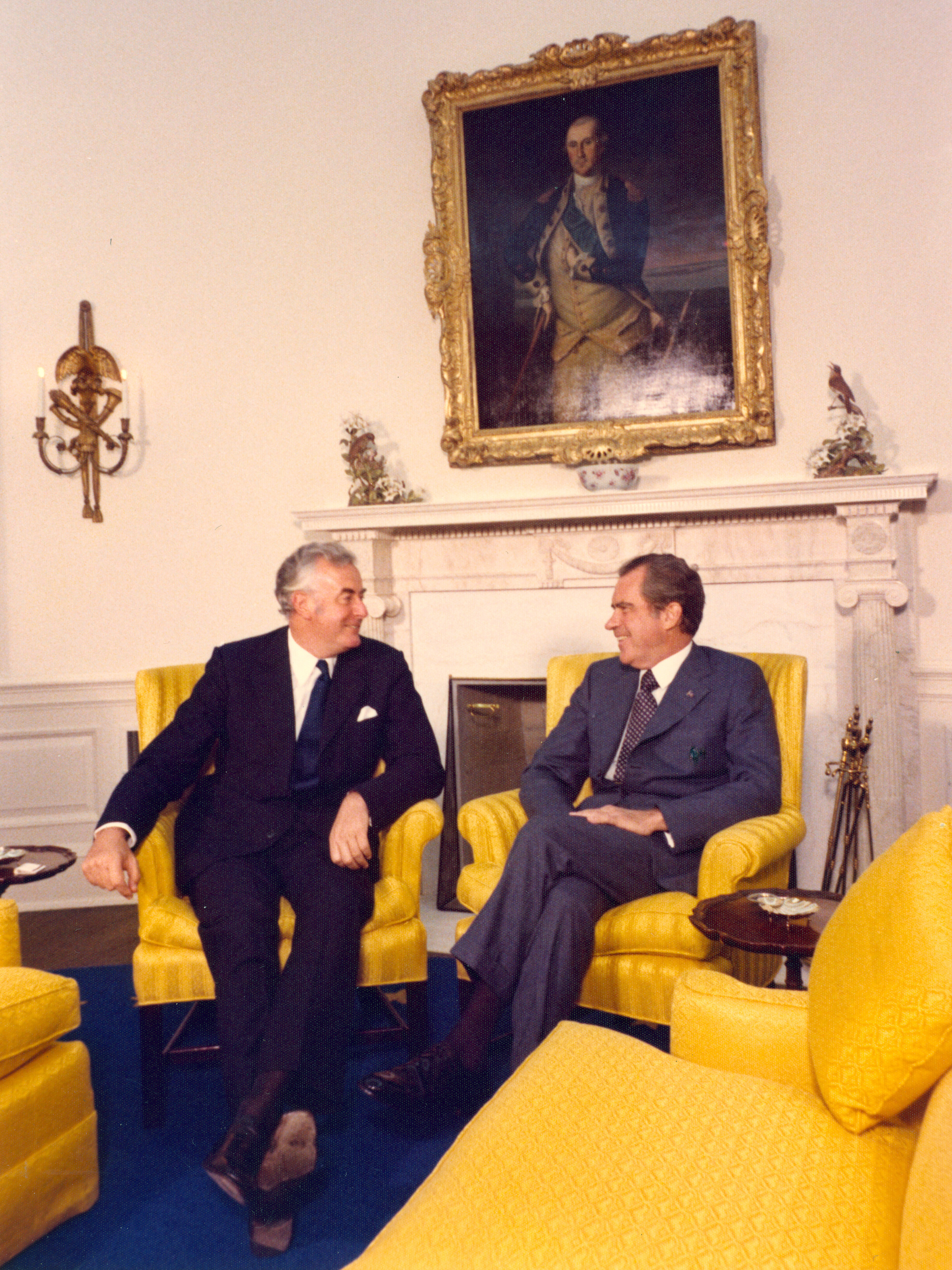

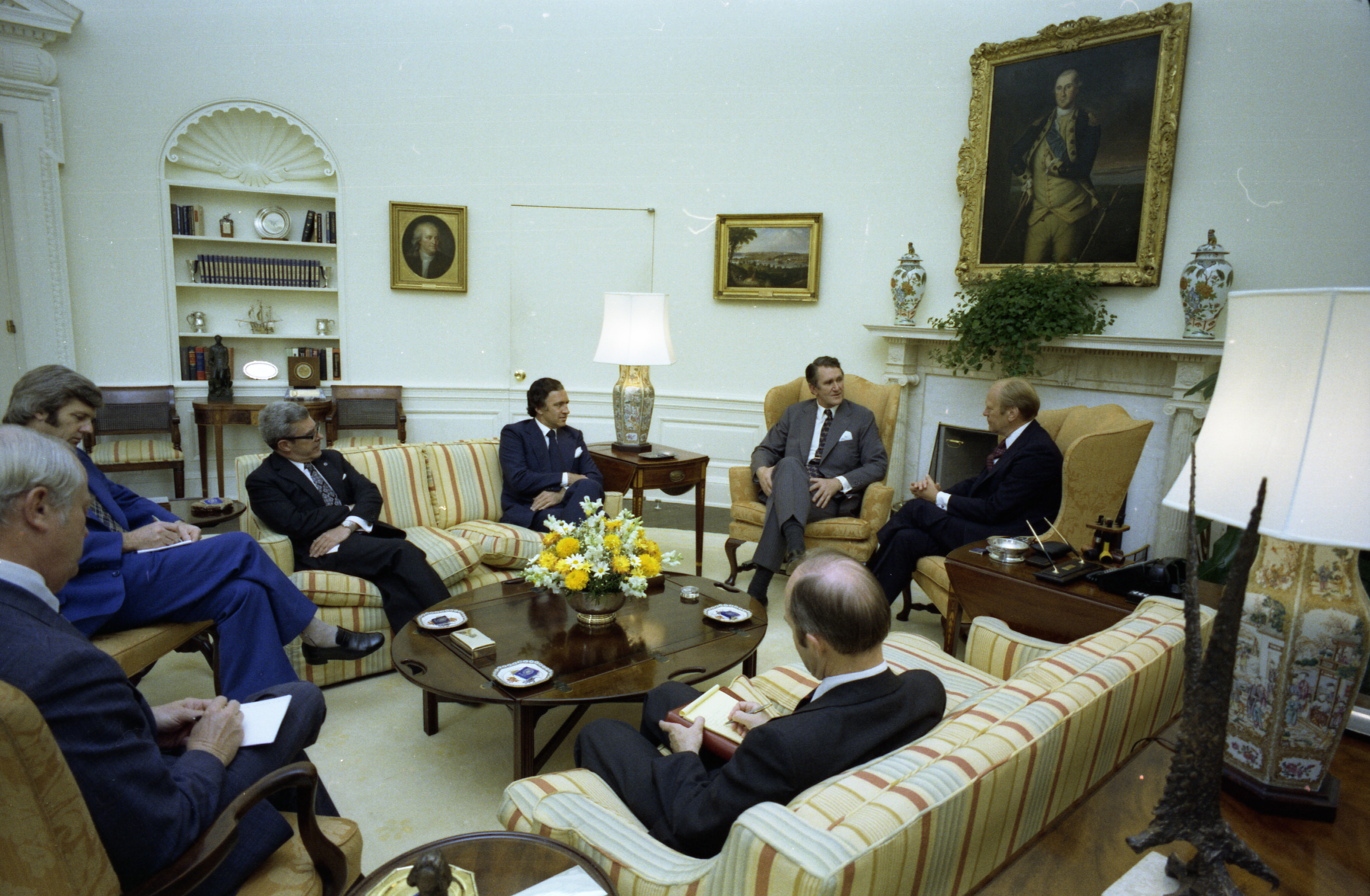

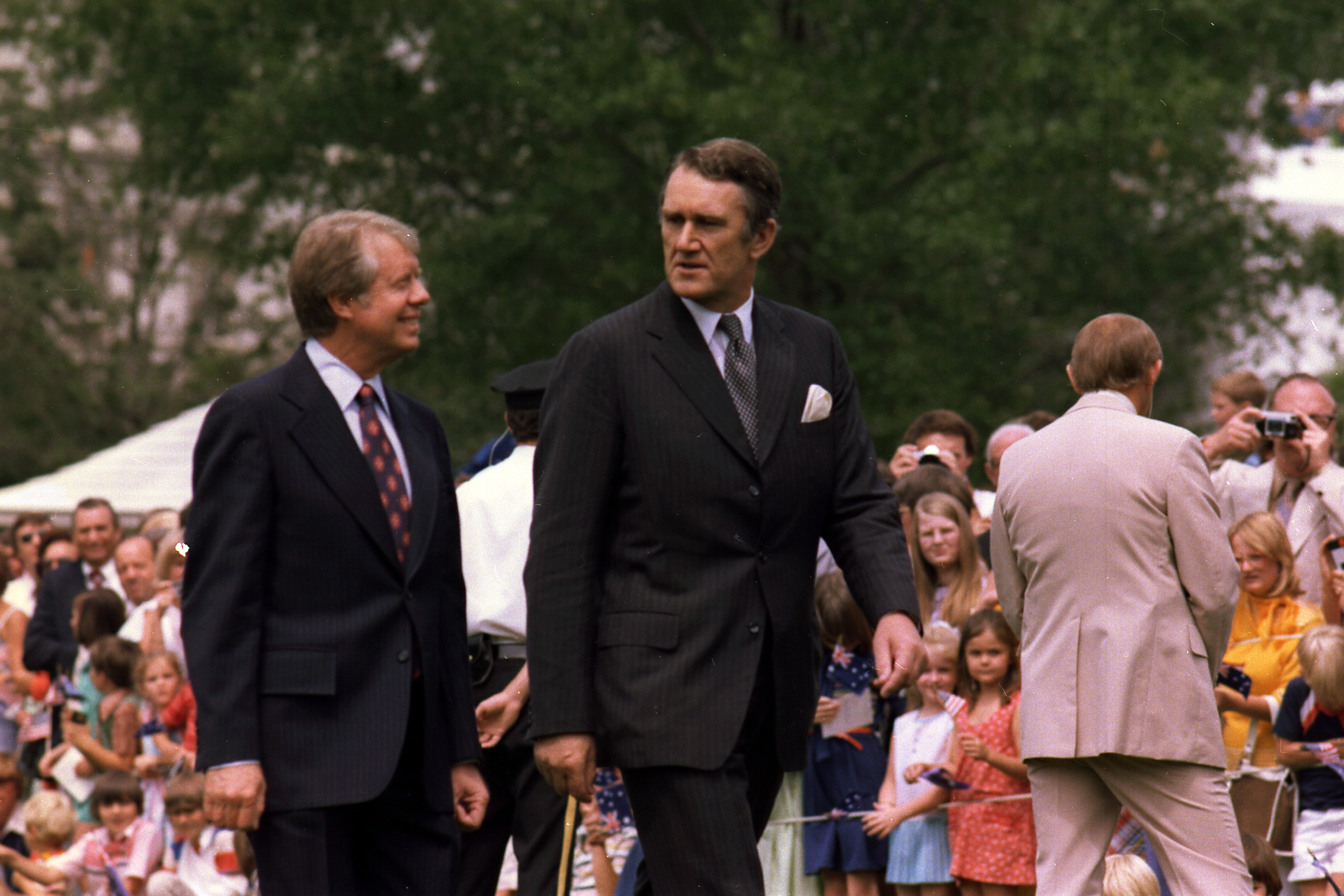

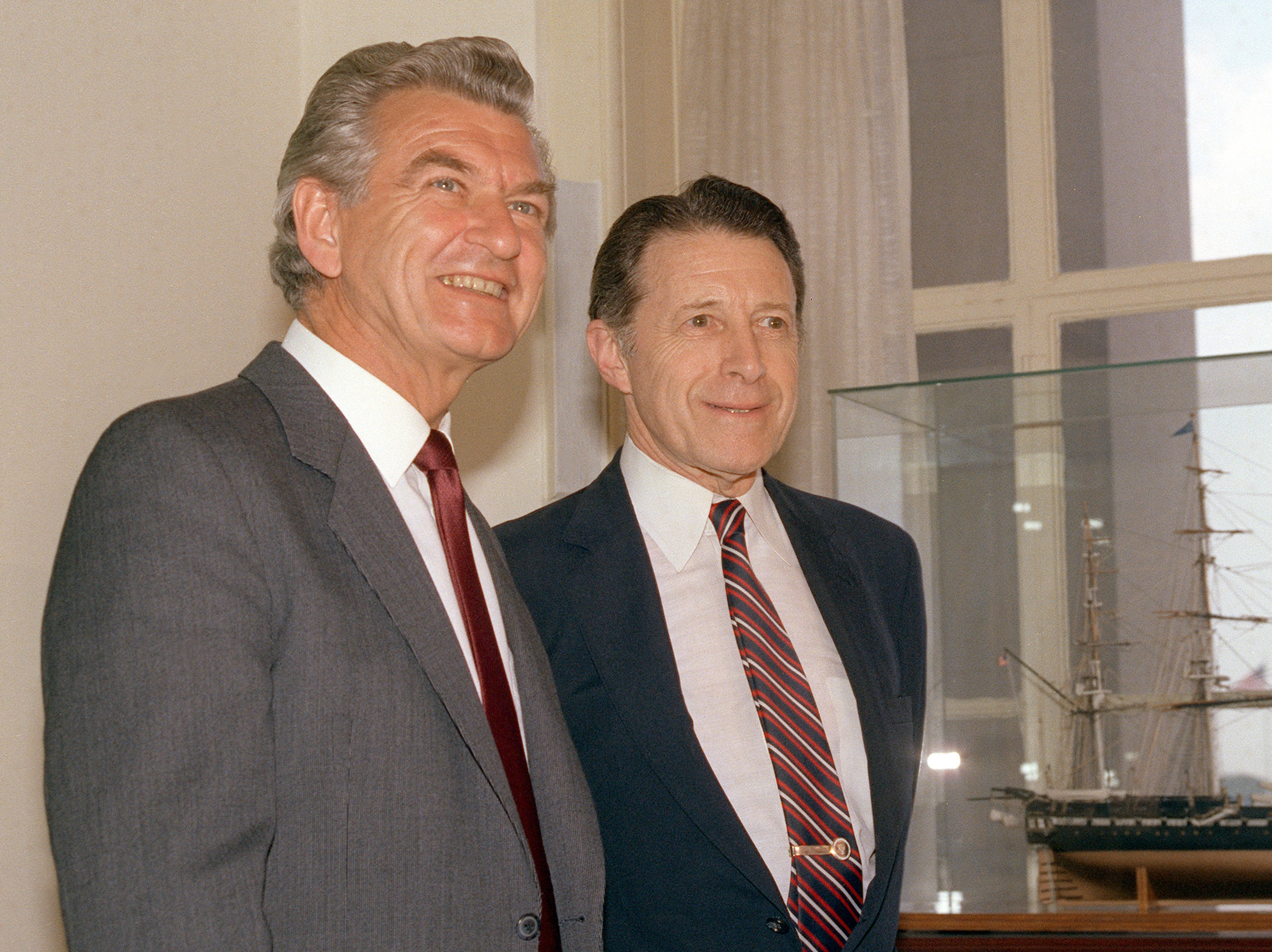

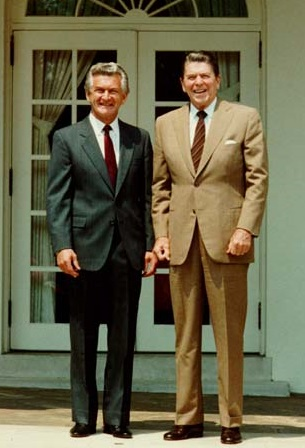

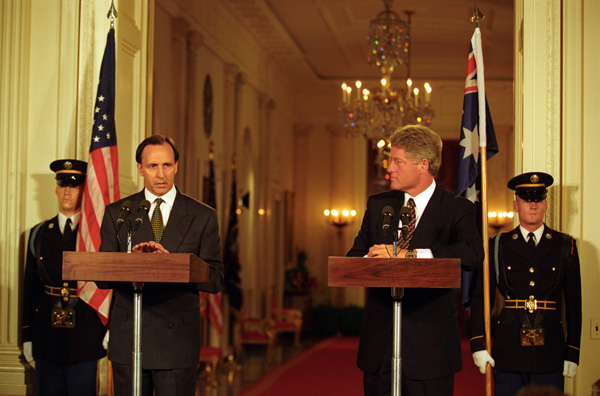

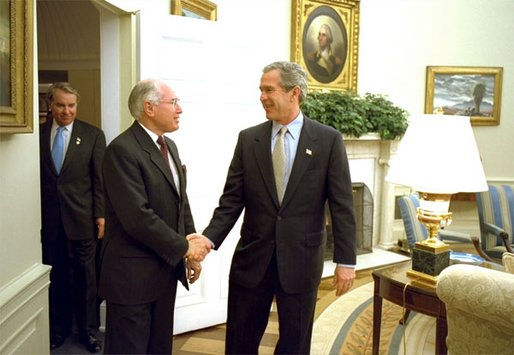

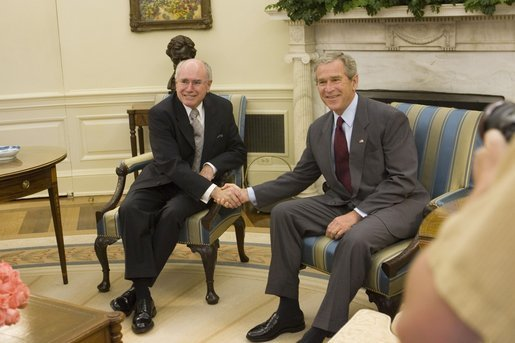

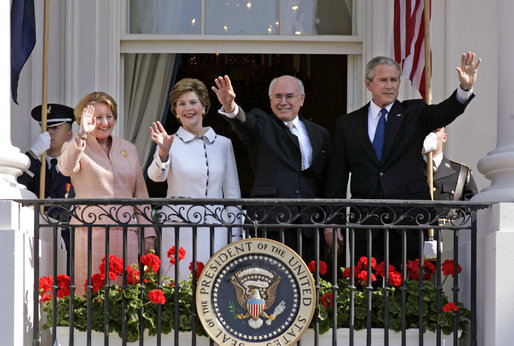

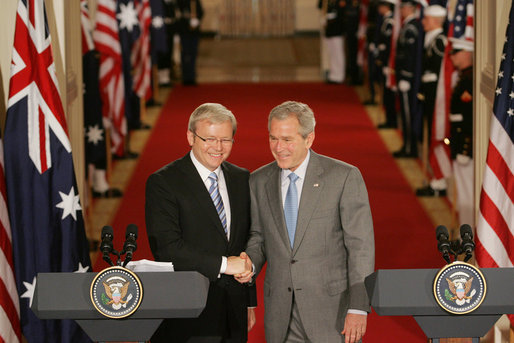

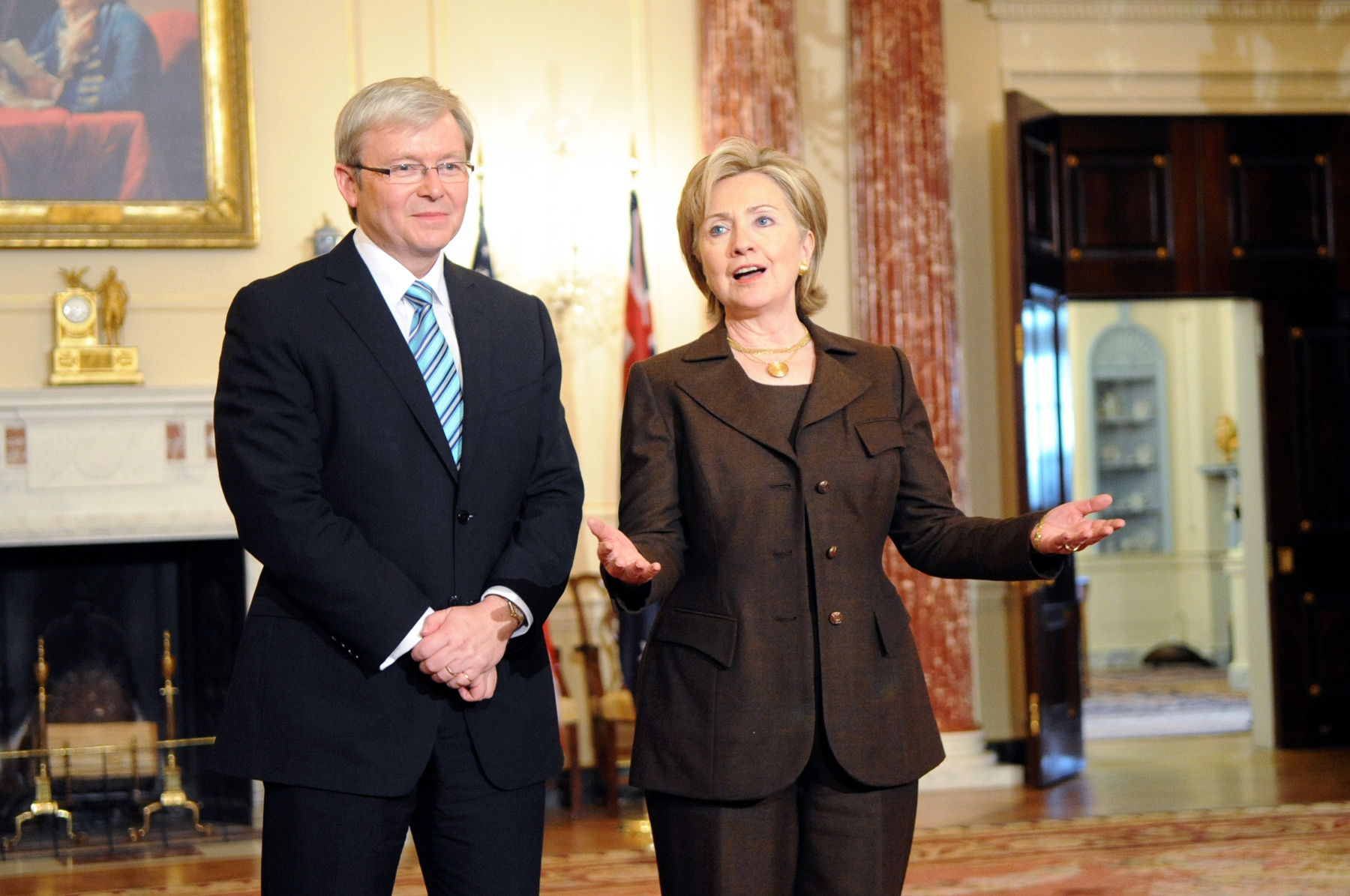

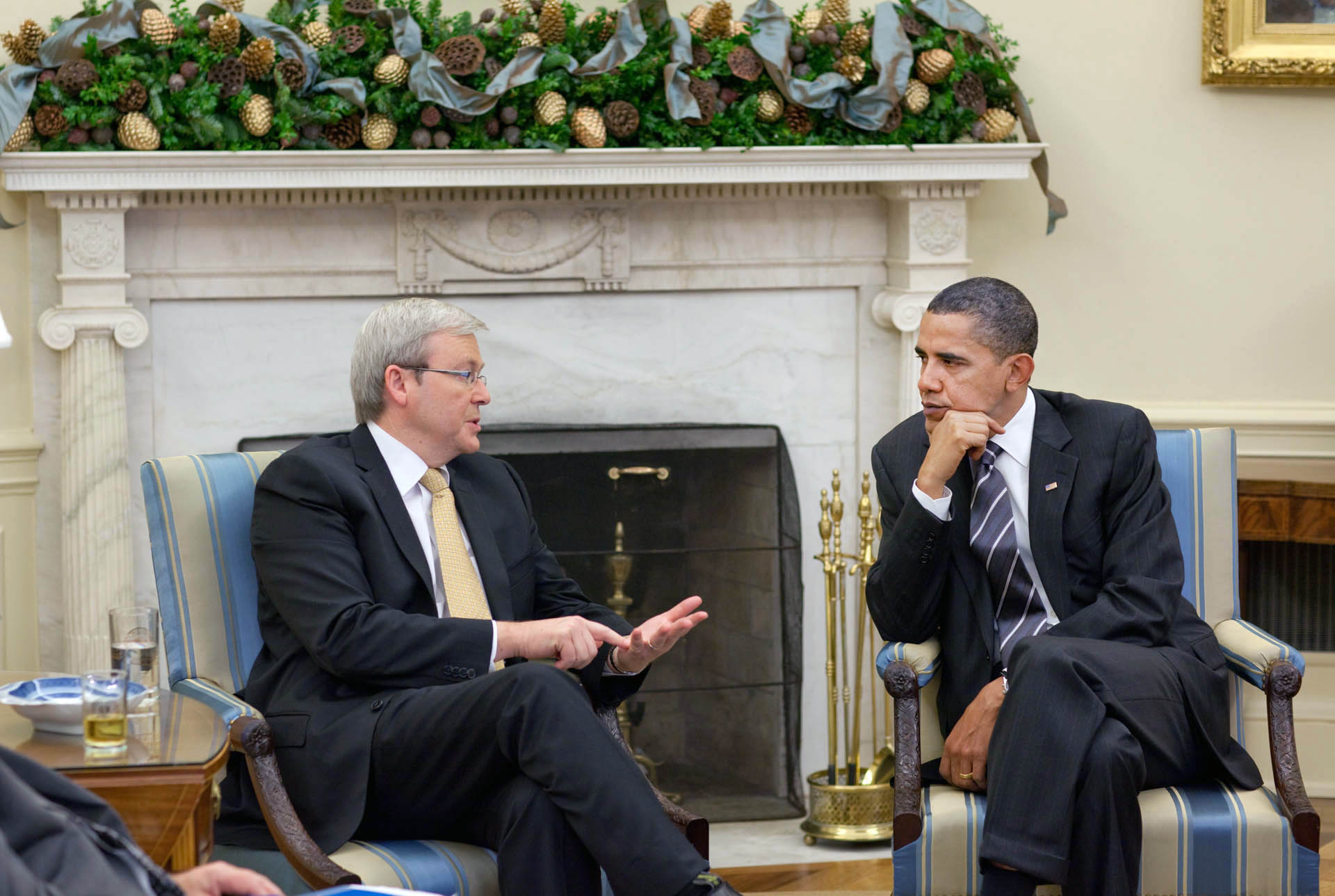

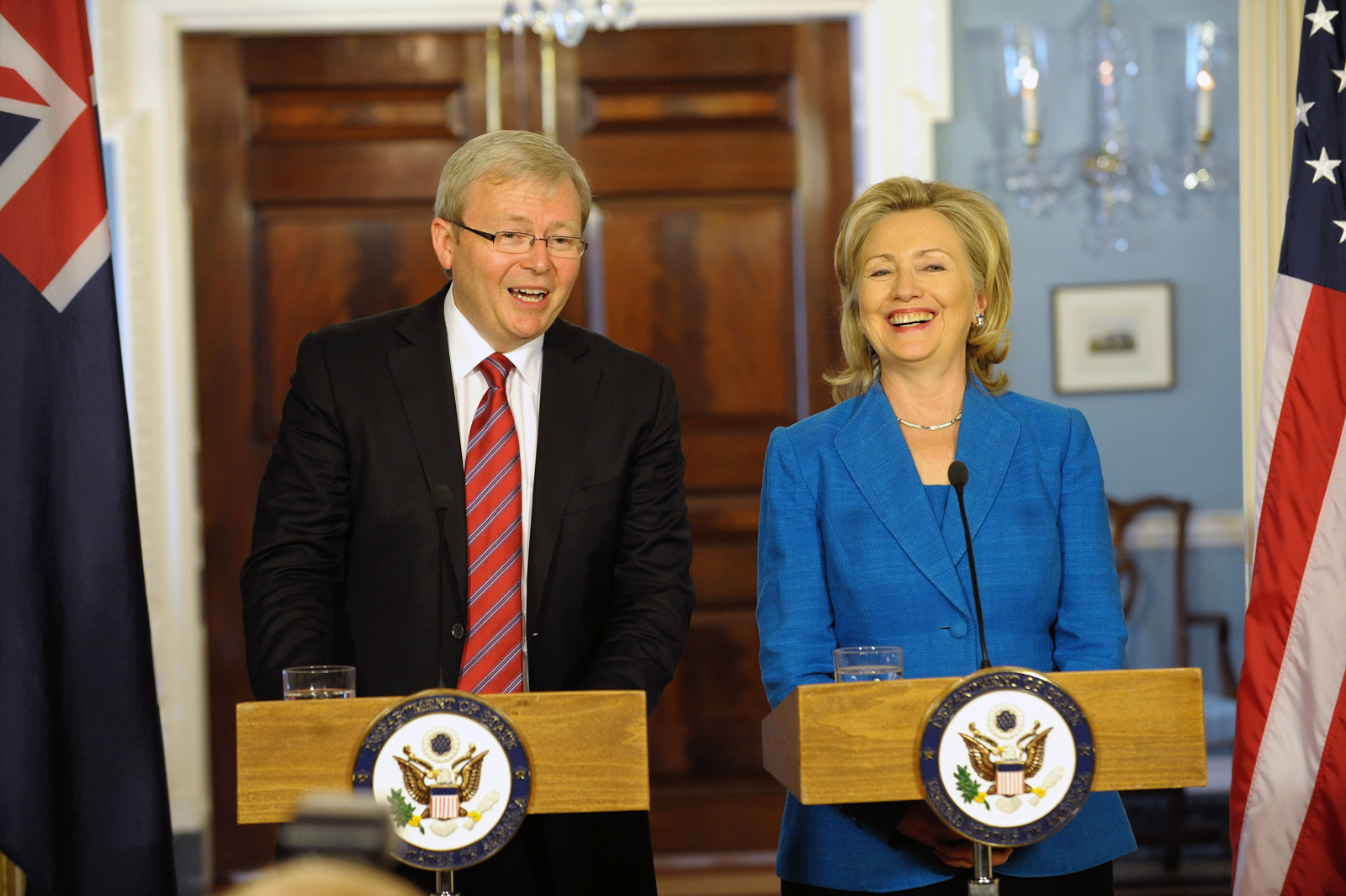

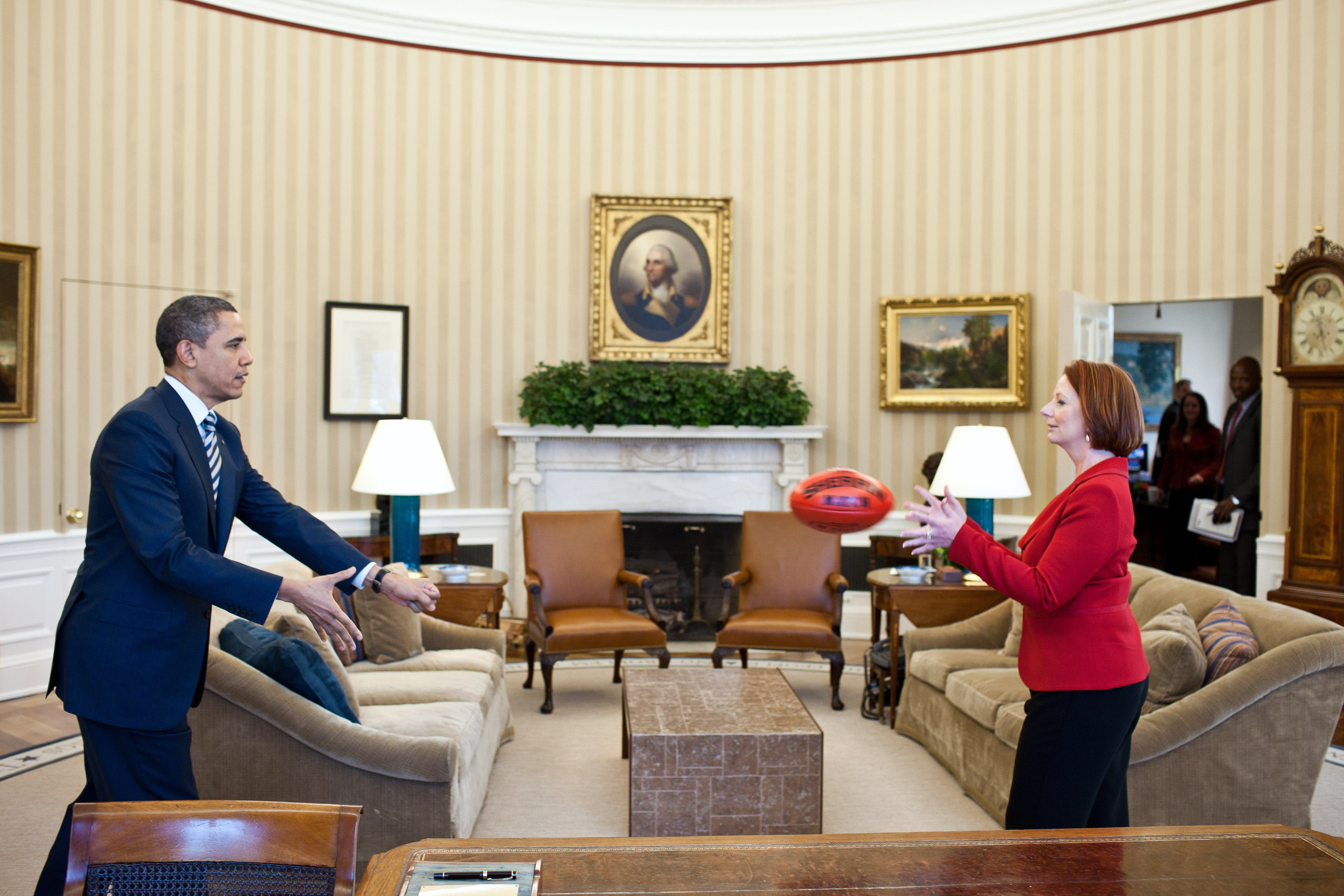

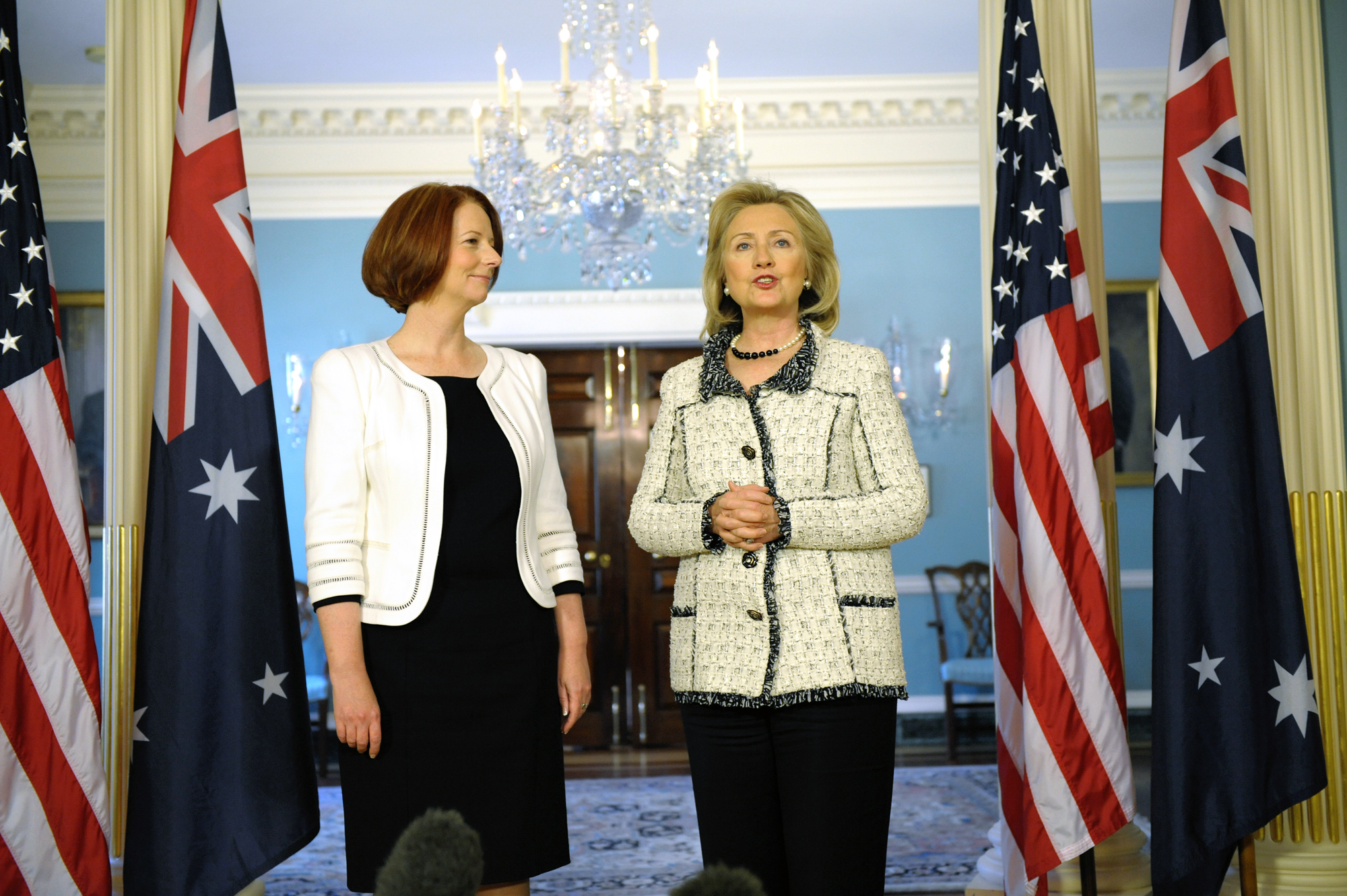

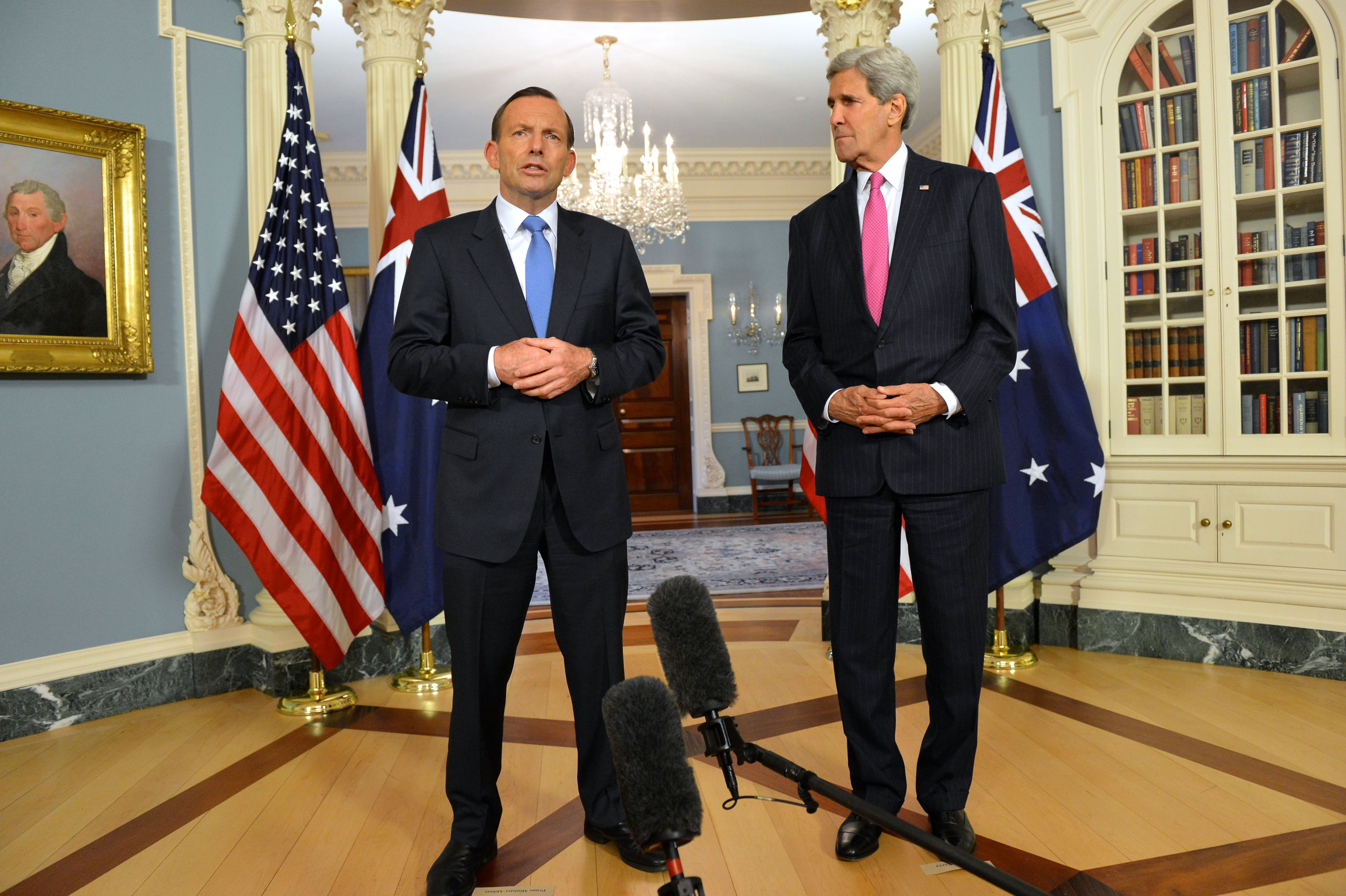

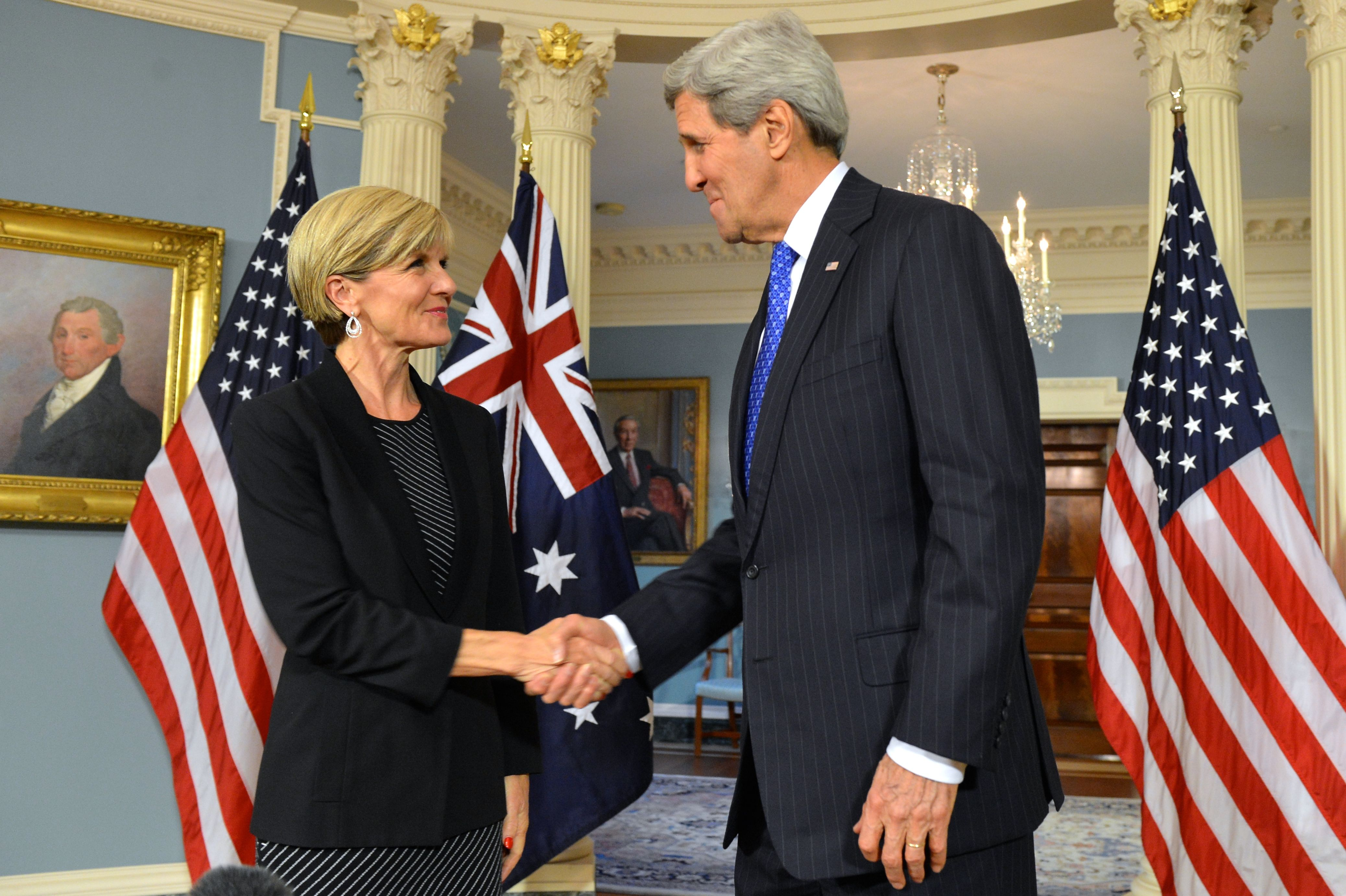

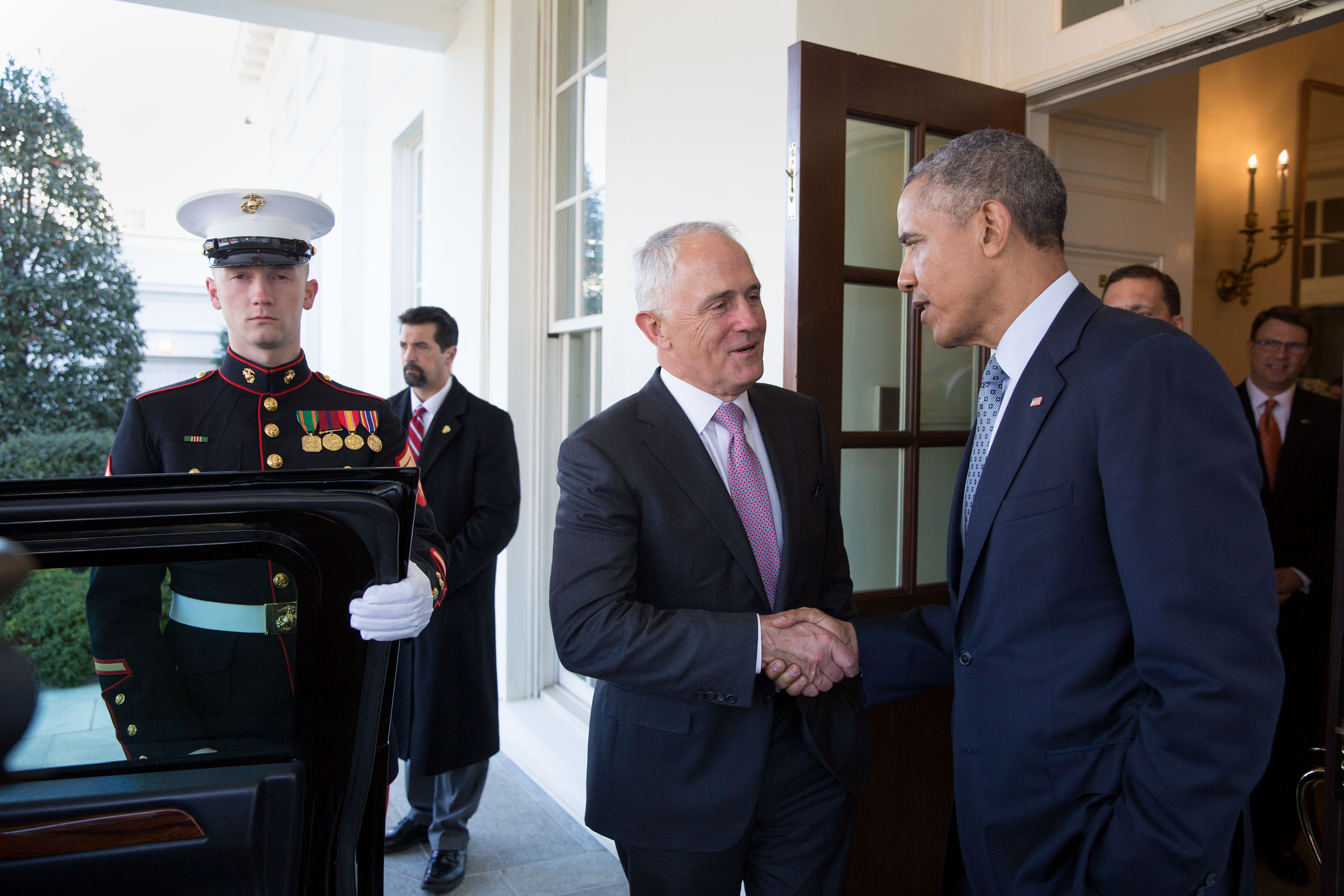

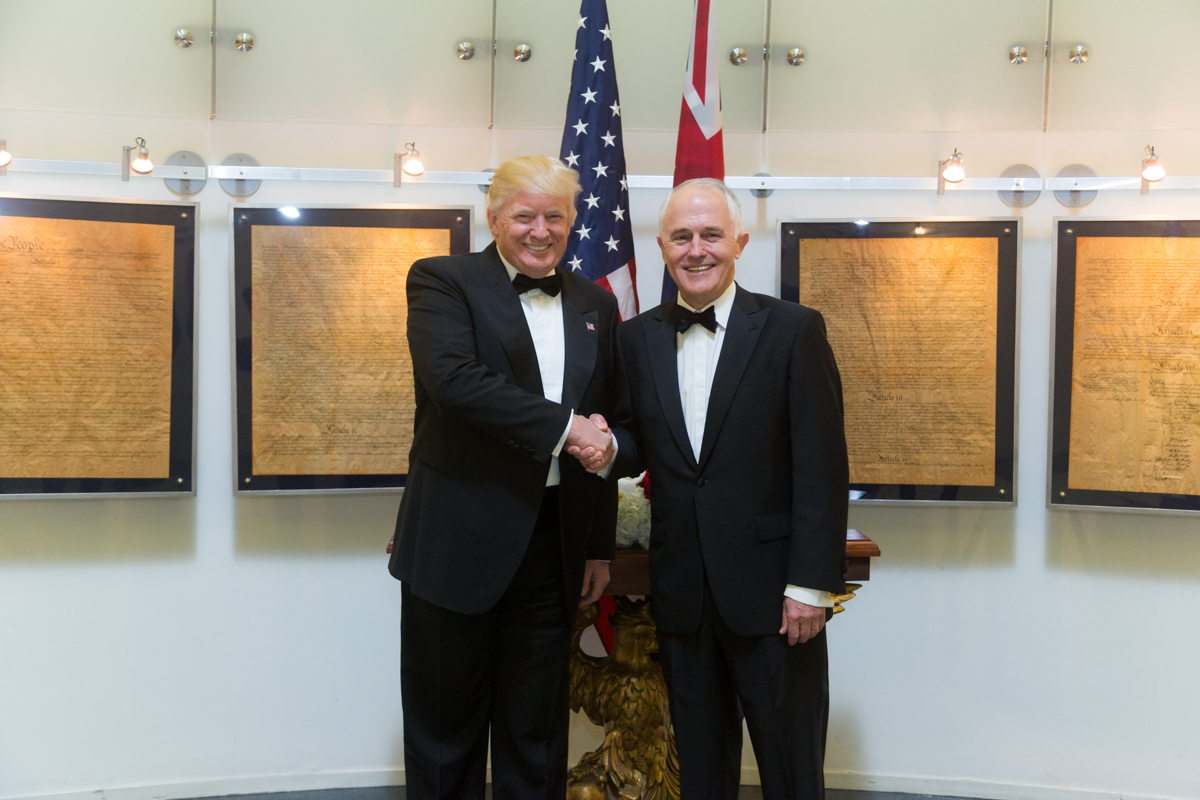

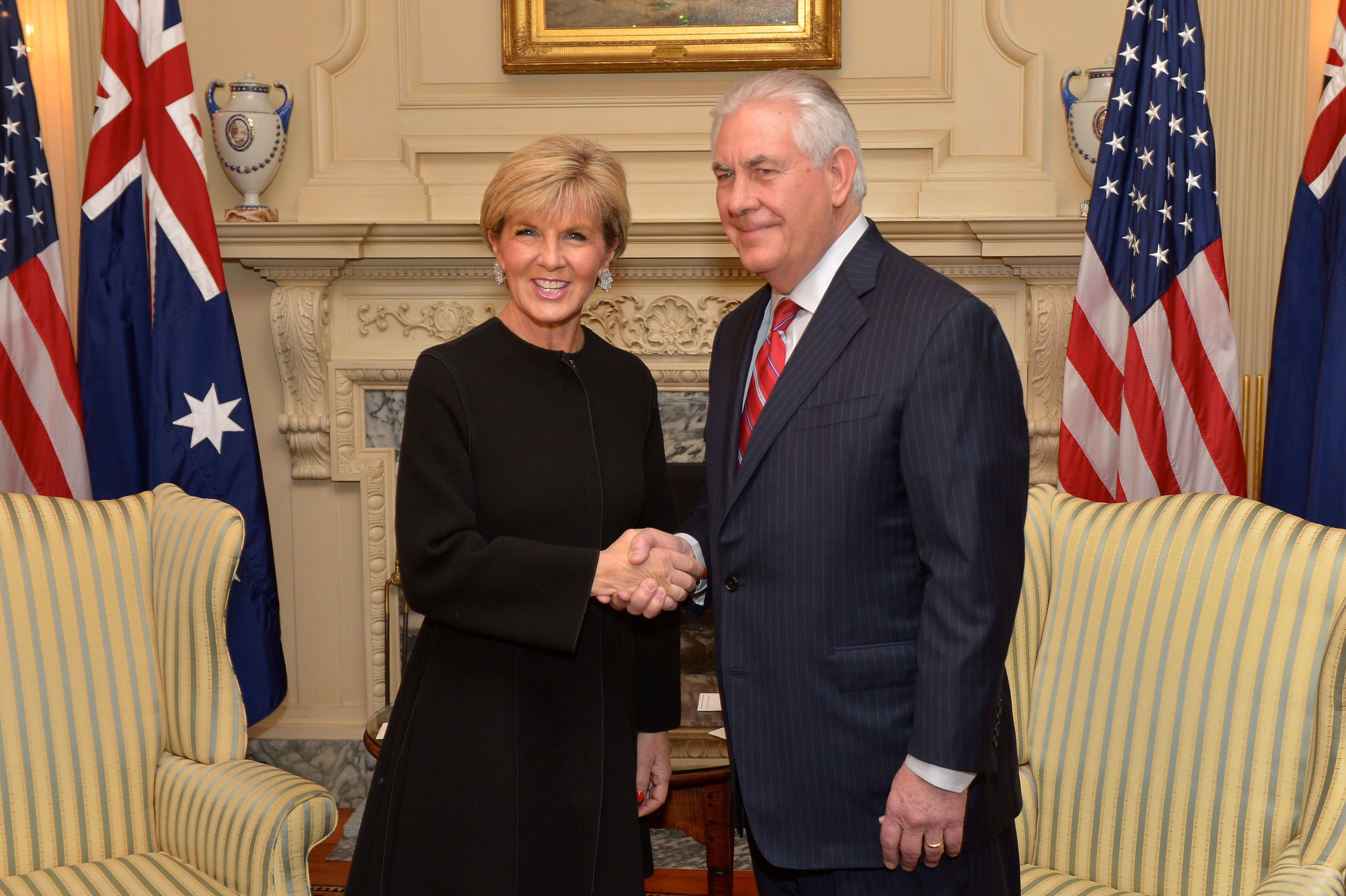

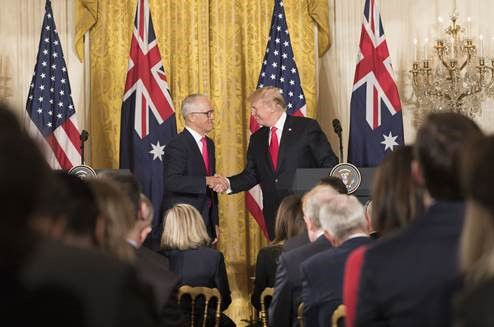

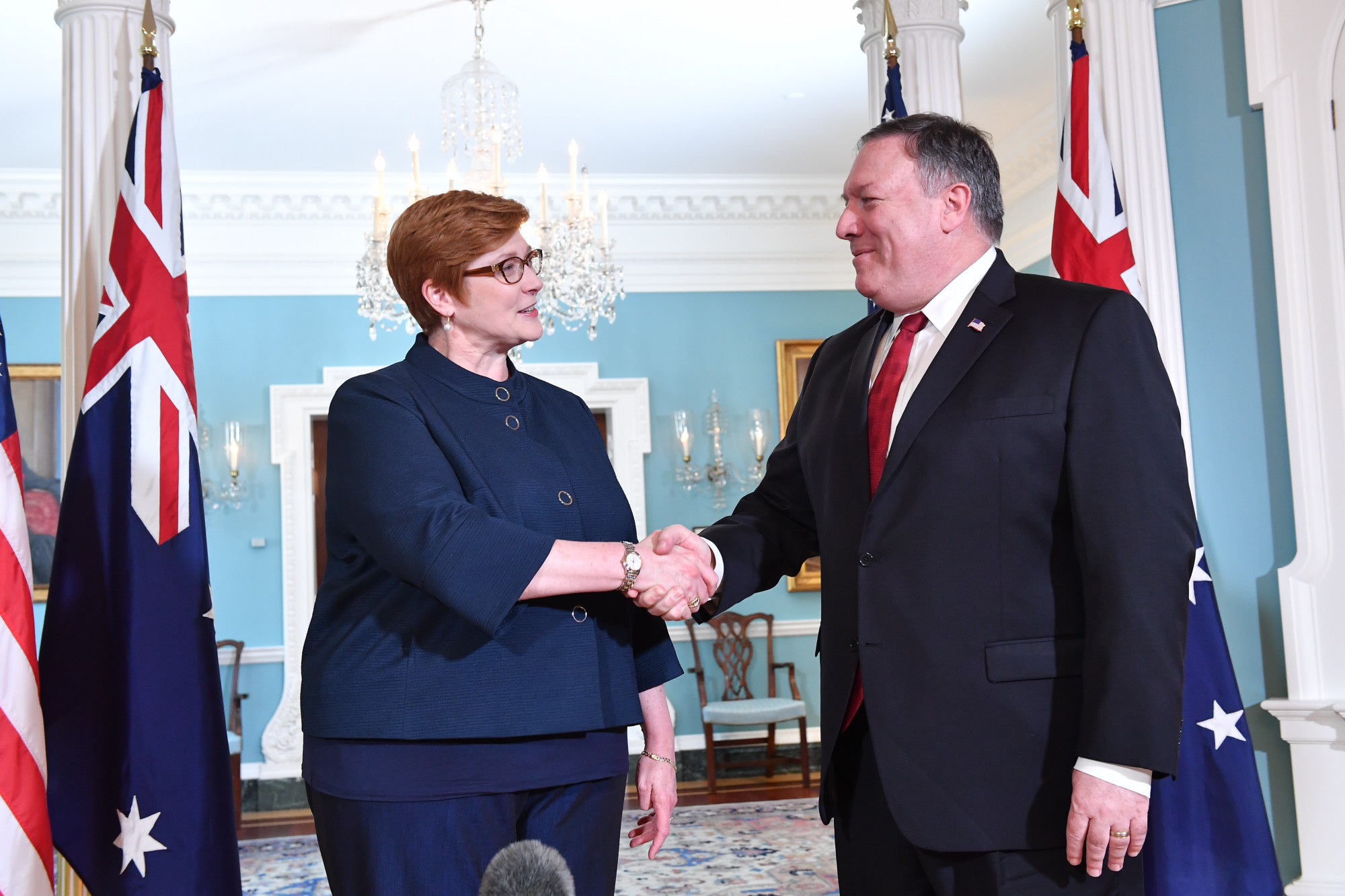

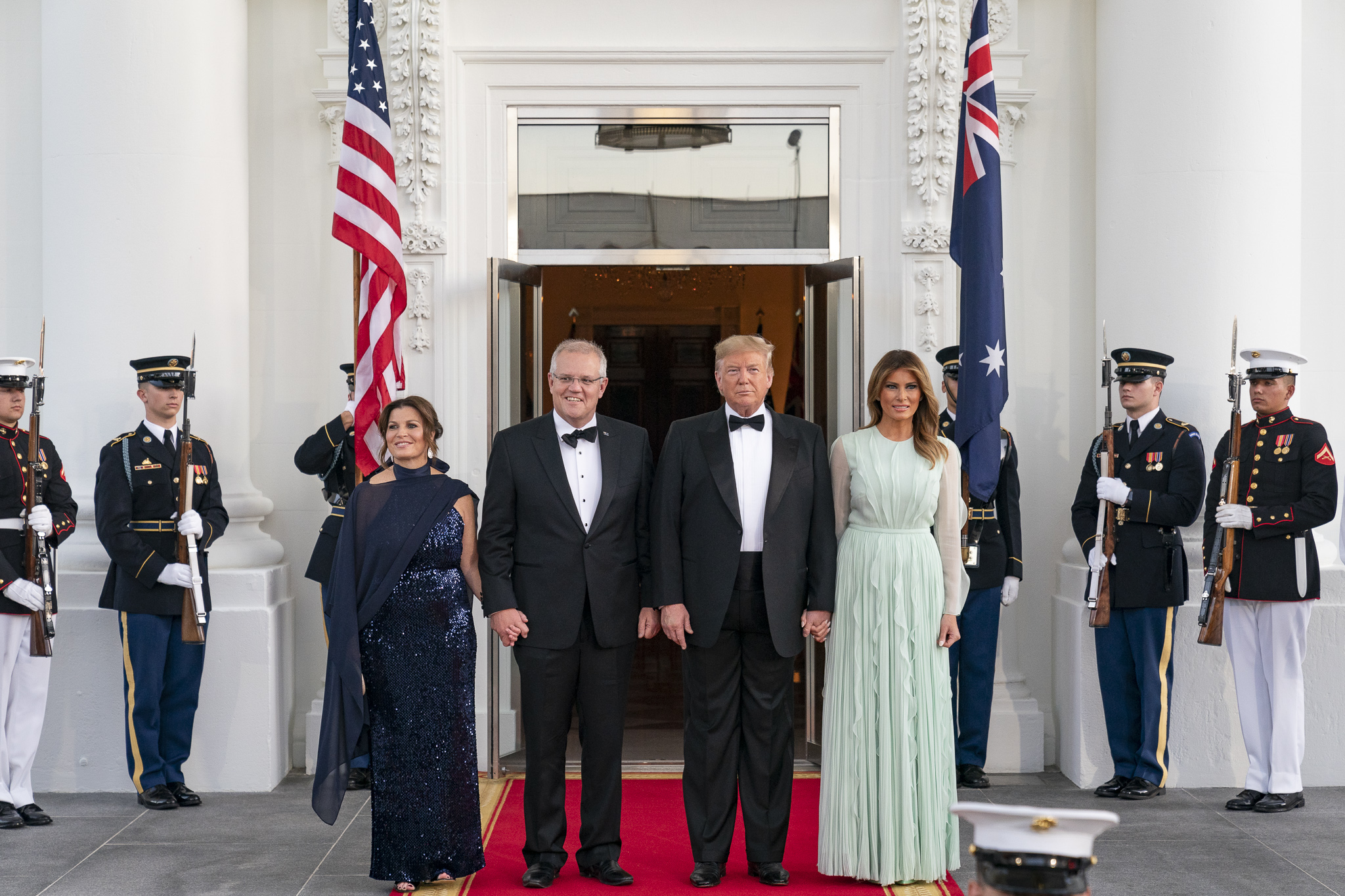

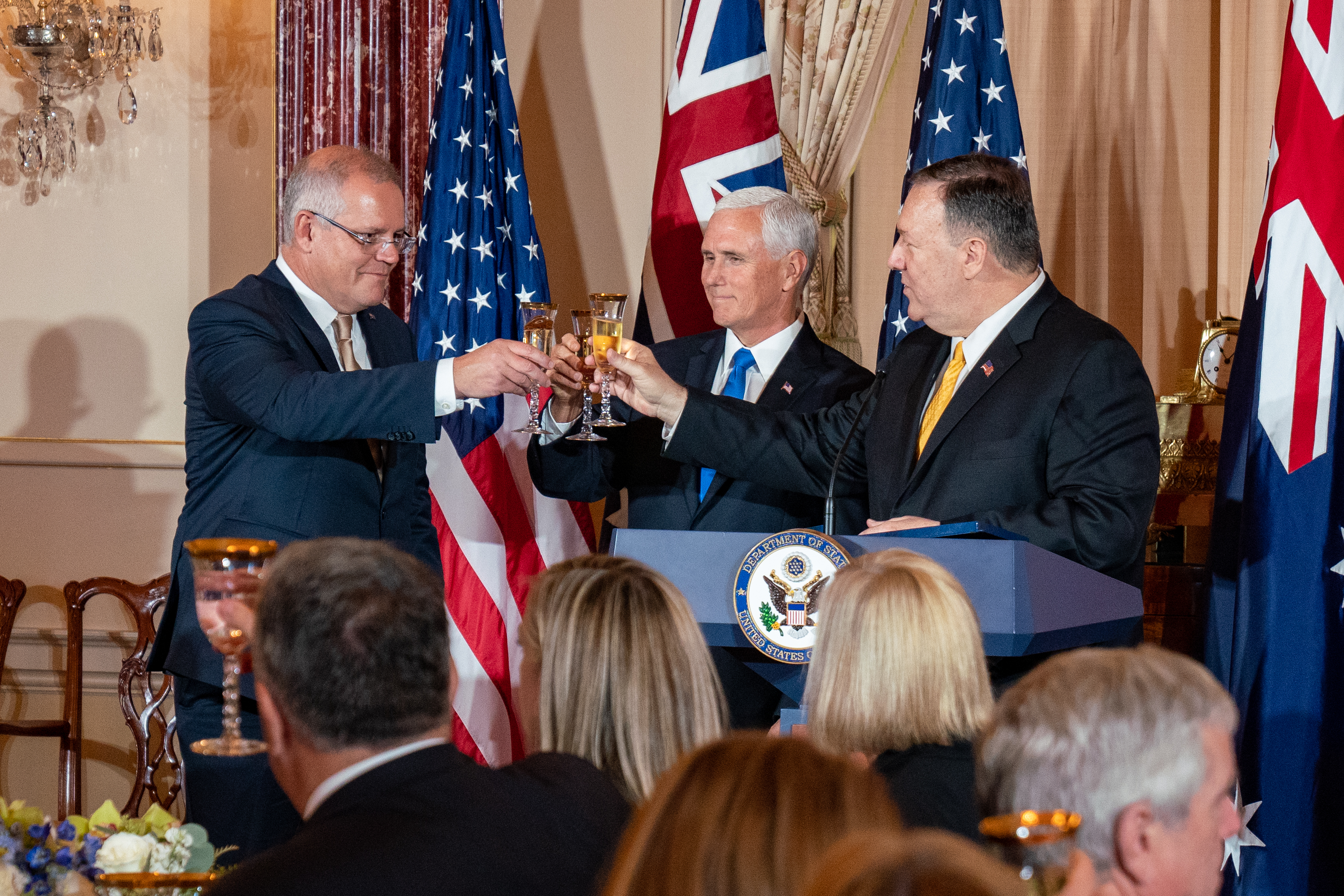

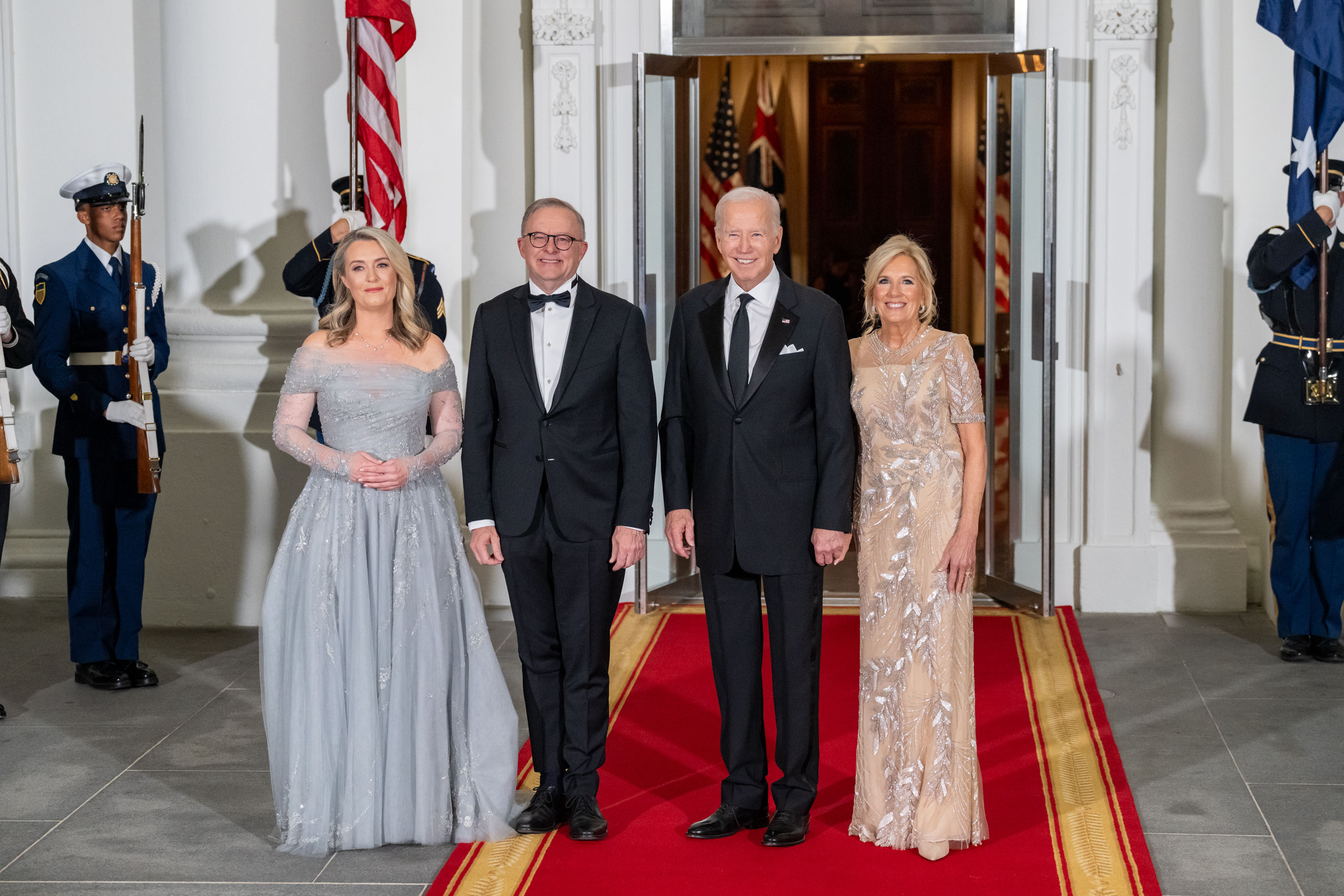

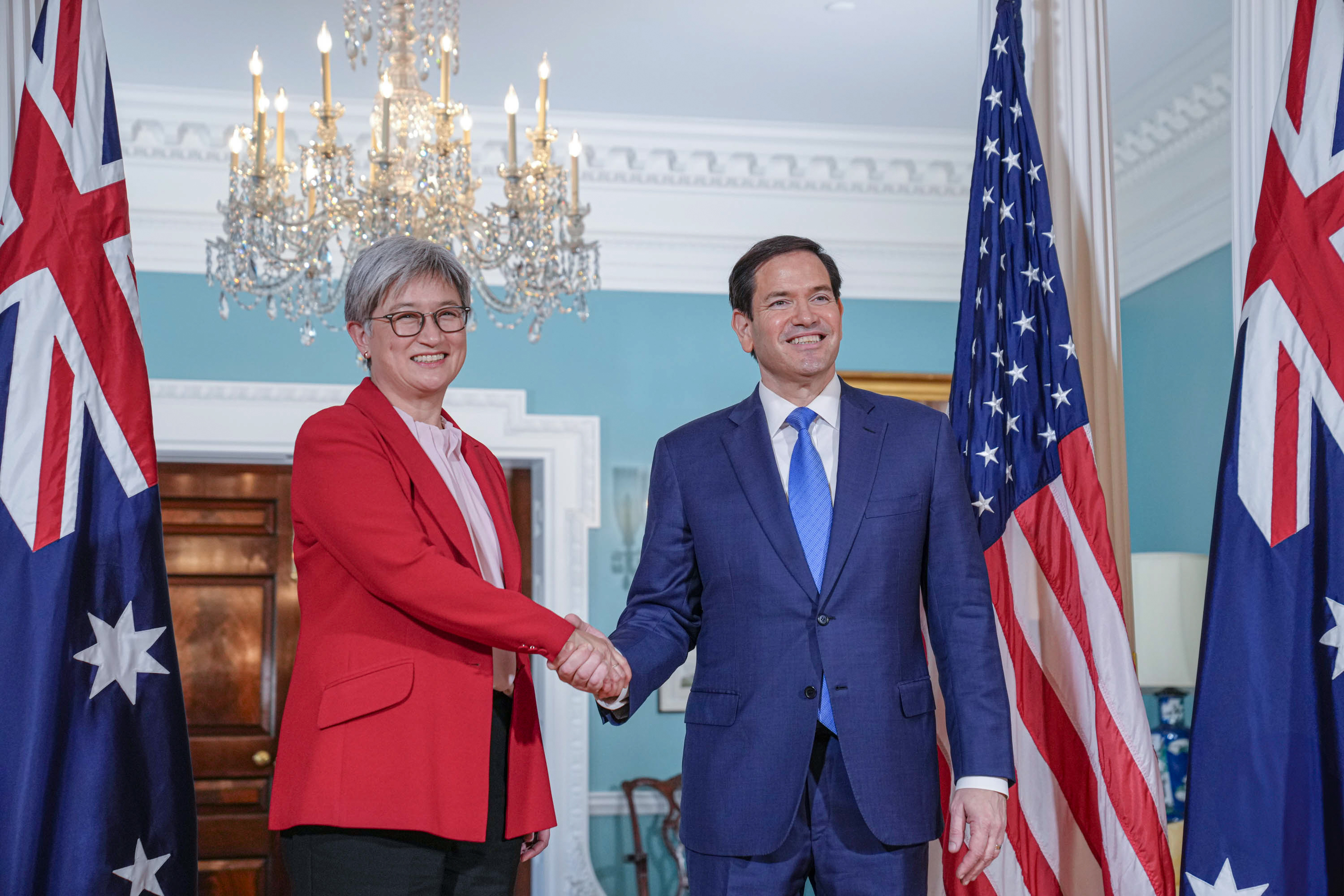

== Cook Islands ==
Table of Trips
Start	End	Guest	Title	Reason
September 28, 2022	September 28, 2022	Mark Brown	Prime Minister	Attended the U.S.-Pacific Island Country Summit.
September 25, 2023	September 25, 2023	Mark Brown	Prime Minister	Attended the Pacific Islands Countries Summit.

== Fiji ==
Table of Trips
Start	End	Guest	Title	Reason
October 24, 1970	October 24, 1970	Kamisese Mara	Prime Minister	Attended White House dinner on 25th Anniversary of the U.N.
November 25, 1984	November 29, 1984	Kamisese Mara	Prime Minister	Official working visit. Private visit to New York City afterward.
November 6, 1989	November 6, 1989	Kamisese Mara	Prime Minister	Met with President Bush during a private visit.
October 27, 1990	October 27, 1990	Kamisese Mara	Prime Minister	Attended Pacific Island Nations-United States Summit in Honolulu, Hawaii
September 28, 2022	September 28, 2022	Frank Bainimarama	Prime Minister	Attended the U.S.-Pacific Island Country Summit.
September 25, 2023	September 25, 2023	Sitiveni Rabuka	Prime Minister	Attended the Pacific Islands Countries Summit.
November 12, 2023	November 17, 2023	Sitiveni Rabuka	Prime Minister	Invited Guest to APEC Leaders' Summit.

== French Polynesia ==
Table of Trips
Start	End	Guest	Title	Reason
September 28, 2022	September 28, 2022	Édouard Fritch	President	Attended the U.S.-Pacific Island Country Summit.
September 25, 2023	September 25, 2023	Moetai Brotherson	President	Attended the Pacific Islands Countries Summit.

== Hawaii ==
Table of Trips
Start	End	Guest	Title	Reason
December 12, 1874	December 23, 1875	Kalākaua	King	In U.S.November 29, 1874 – February 2, 1875. Stops included New York City, Boston, Chicago, St. Louis, Omaha. First visit by a foreign Chief of State or Head of Government to the United States.
September 28, 1881	September 28, 1881	Kalākaua	King	Private visit during world tour. In U.S.September 23 – October 22, visiting New York City, Philadelphia, Baltimore, Hampton, Lexington, Omaha and San Francisco.
January 26, 1898	February 6, 1898	Sanford B. Dole	President	Discussed U.S. annexation of Hawaii. In U.S. January 17 – February 22, visiting San Francisco, Chicago, Buffalo, Cleveland, and St. Louis.

== Kiribati ==
Table of Trips
Start	End	Guest	Title	Reason
October 27, 1990	October 27, 1990	Ieremia Tabai	President	Attended Pacific Island Nations-United States Summit in Honolulu, Hawaii
September 25, 2023	September 25, 2023	Taneti Maamau	President	Attended the Pacific Islands Countries Summit.

== Marshall Islands ==
Table of Trips
Start	End	Guest	Title	Reason
June 12, 1990	June 12, 1990	Amata Kabua	President	Private visit.
October 27, 1990	October 27, 1990	Amata Kabua	President	Attended Pacific Island Nations-United States Summit in Honolulu, Hawaii
September 24, 1991	September 24, 1991	Amata Kabua	President	Met with President Bush while attending the U.N. General Assembly in New York City.
November 23, 1998	November 23, 1998	Amata Kabua	President	Met with President Clinton at Agana, Guam.
May 21, 2019	May 21, 2019	Hilda Heine	President	Working Visit (Leaders of the Freely Associated States).
September 28, 2022	September 28, 2022	David Kabua	President	Attended the U.S.-Pacific Island Country Summit.
September 25, 2023	September 25, 2023	David Kabua	President	Attended the Pacific Islands Countries Summit.
September 24, 2024	September 24, 2024	Hilda Heine	President	Met with President Biden at the UN General Assembly in New York City.

== Micronesia (Federated States of) ==
Table of Trips
Start	End	Guest	Title	Reason
October 27, 1990	October 27, 1990	John Haglelgam	President	Attended Pacific Island Nations-United States Summit in Honolulu, Hawaii
November 30, 1990	November 30, 1990	John Haglelgam	President	Met with President Bush during a private visit.
September 24, 1991	September 24, 1991	Bailey Olter	President	Met with President Bush while attending the U.N. General Assembly in New York City.
November 23, 1998	November 23, 1998	Jacob Nena	President	Met with President Clinton at Agana, Guam.
May 21, 2019	May 21, 2019	David Panuelo	President	Working Visit (Leaders of the Freely Associated States).
September 28, 2022	September 28, 2022	David Panuelo	President	Attended the U.S.-Pacific Island Country Summit.
September 25, 2023	September 25, 2023	Wesley Simina	President	Attended the Pacific Islands Countries Summit.
September 24, 2024	September 24, 2024	Wesley Simina	President	Met with President Biden at the UN General Assembly in New York City.

== Nauru ==
Table of Trips
Start	End	Guest	Title	Reason
May 8, 1989	May 8, 1989	Hammer DeRoburt	President	Met with President Bush during a private visit.
October 27, 1990	October 27, 1990	Bernard Dowiyogo	President	Attended Pacific Island Nations-United States Summit in Honolulu, Hawaii
September 25, 2023	September 25, 2023	Russ Kun	President	Attended the Pacific Islands Countries Summit.

== New Caledonia ==
Table of Trips
Start	End	Guest	Title	Reason
September 28, 2022	September 28, 2022	Louis Mapou	President	Attended the U.S.-Pacific Island Country Summit.
September 25, 2023	September 25, 2023	Louis Mapou	President	Attended the Pacific Islands Countries Summit.

== New Zealand ==
Table of Trips
Start	End	Guest	Title	Reason
August 26, 1942	September 4, 1942	Peter Fraser	Prime Minister	Guest of the President.Attended a Pacific War Council meeting.
April 14, 1944	April 22, 1944	Peter Fraser	Prime Minister	En route to London for Conference of British Commonwealth Prime Ministers. Attended opening session of the International Labour Organization in Philadelphia, April 20.Afterwards visited New York City.
April 25, 1945	June 26, 1945	Peter Fraser	Prime Minister	Led New Zealand delegation to the United Nations Conference in San Francisco.
February 5, 1951	February 10, 1951	Sidney Holland	Prime Minister	Met with President Truman February 8 while returning from a Commonwealth Conference in London.
May 17, 1953	May 20, 1953	Sidney Holland	Prime Minister	Met with President Eisenhower en route to London for the Coronation of Queen Elizabeth II.
January 20, 1955	January 23, 1955	Sidney Holland	Prime Minister	Unofficial visit. Left New York City January 27.
March 3, 1961	March 3, 1961	Keith Holyoake	Prime Minister	Informal visit; discussed Laos crisis with President Kennedy.In U.S.March 2–4.
September 28, 1962	September 27, 1962	Keith Holyoake	Prime Minister	Informal visit while attending UN General Assembly.
July 17, 1964	July 20, 1964	Keith Holyoake	Prime Minister	Attended ANZUS Council meeting.
October 9, 1968	October 10, 1968	Keith Holyoake	Prime Minister	Official visit. In U.S.October 6–16; attended ANZUS Council meeting and visited Los Angeles, New York City, and Seattle.
September 15, 1969	September 18, 1969	Keith Holyoake	Prime Minister	Official visit. In U.S.September 14–21; visited Los Angeles and New York City
April 8, 1971	April 8, 1971	Keith Holyoake	Prime Minister	Informal visit.
September 26, 1973	September 29, 1973	Norman Kirk	Prime Minister	Official visit; fifth to the U.S.; first as Head of Government.
May 7, 1975	May 7, 1975	Bill Rowling	Prime Minister	Private visit.
November 8, 1977	November 11, 1977	Robert Muldoon	Prime Minister	Official visit.Private visit afterwards to LaGrange
September 28, 1978	September 28, 1978	Robert Muldoon	Prime Minister	Private visit.
September 18, 1979	September 20, 1979	Robert Muldoon	Prime Minister	Private visit. Opened new Chancery.
July 23, 1981	July 25, 1981	Robert Muldoon	Prime Minister	Private visit. Met with President Reagan July 24; visited New York City.
February 22, 1984	February 25, 1984	Robert Muldoon	Prime Minister	Official working visit.
March 25, 1995	March 29, 1995	Jim Bolger	Prime Minister	Met with President Clinton during a private visit.
February 13, 1999	February 15, 1999	Jenny Shipley	Prime Minister	Private visit; attended Global Forum on Reinventing Government.
March 26, 2002	March 26, 2002	Helen Clark	Prime Minister	Met with President Bush during a private visit.
March 20, 2007	March 21, 2007	Helen Clark	Prime Minister	Working visit.
May 12, 2010	April 13, 2010	John Key	Prime Minister	Attended the Nuclear Security Summit
July 22, 2011	July 22, 2011	John Key	Prime Minister	Working visit.
January 2, 2014	January 2, 2014	John Key	Prime Minister	Informal meeting at Kanoehe Bay, Hawaii.
June 20, 2014	June 20, 2014	John Key	Prime Minister	Working visit.
March 31, 2016	April 1, 2016	John Key	Prime Minister	Attended the Nuclear Security Summit
July 10, 2024	July 11, 2024	Christopher Luxon	Prime Minister	Attended NATO 75th Anniversary Summit in Washington, D.C.

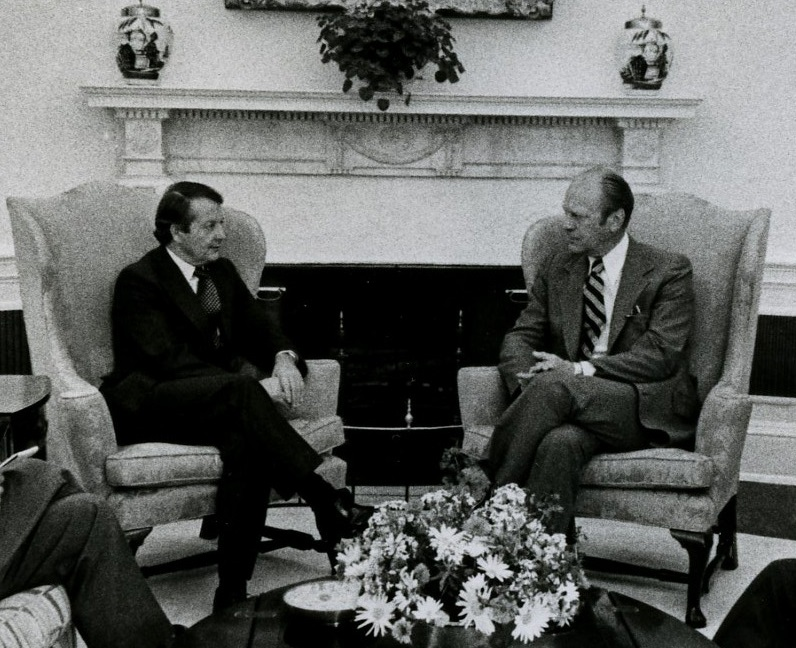

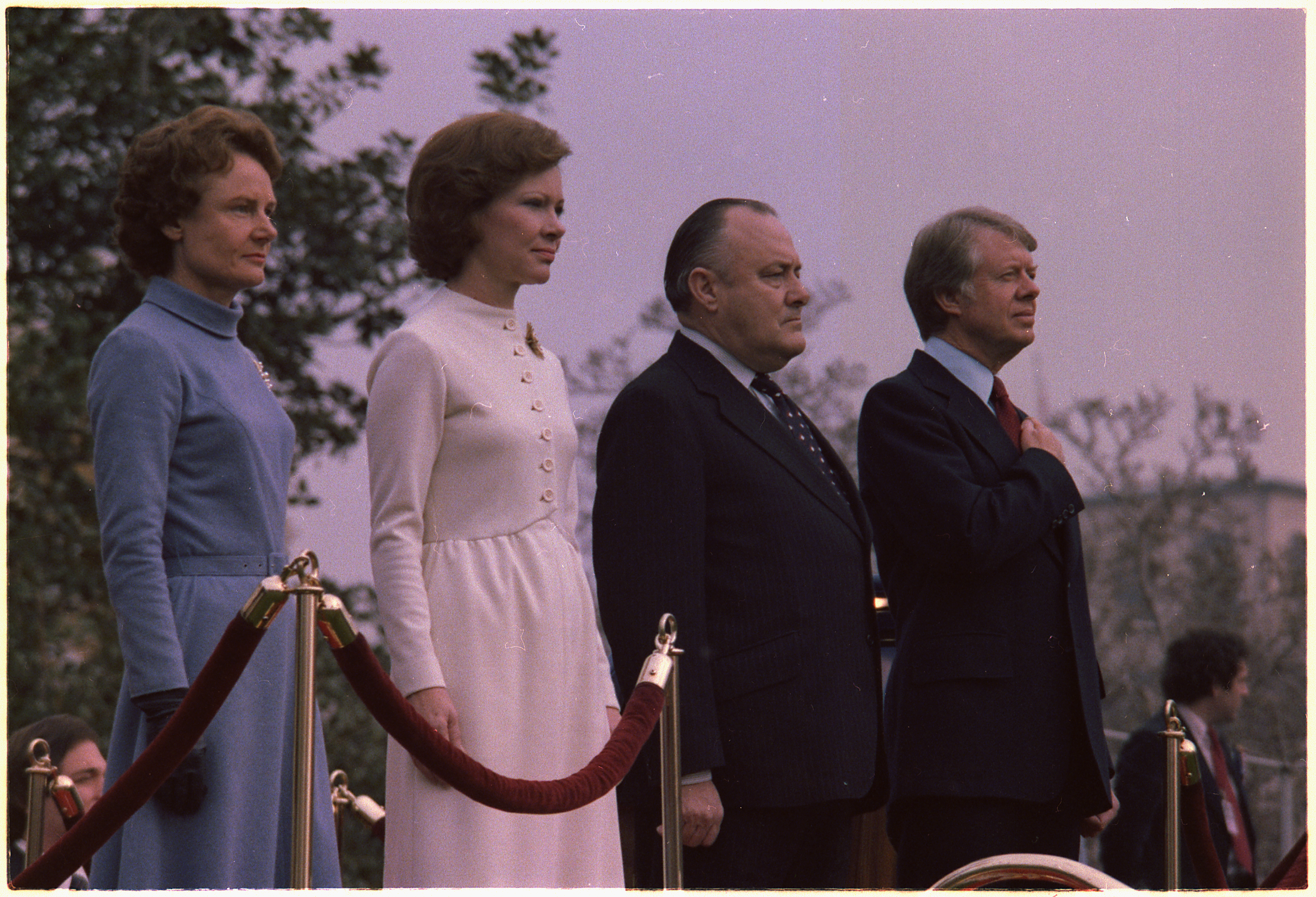

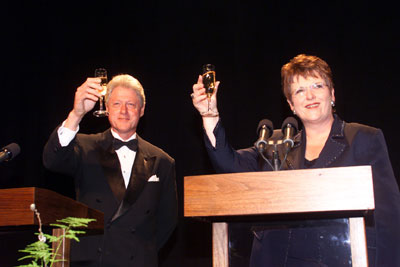

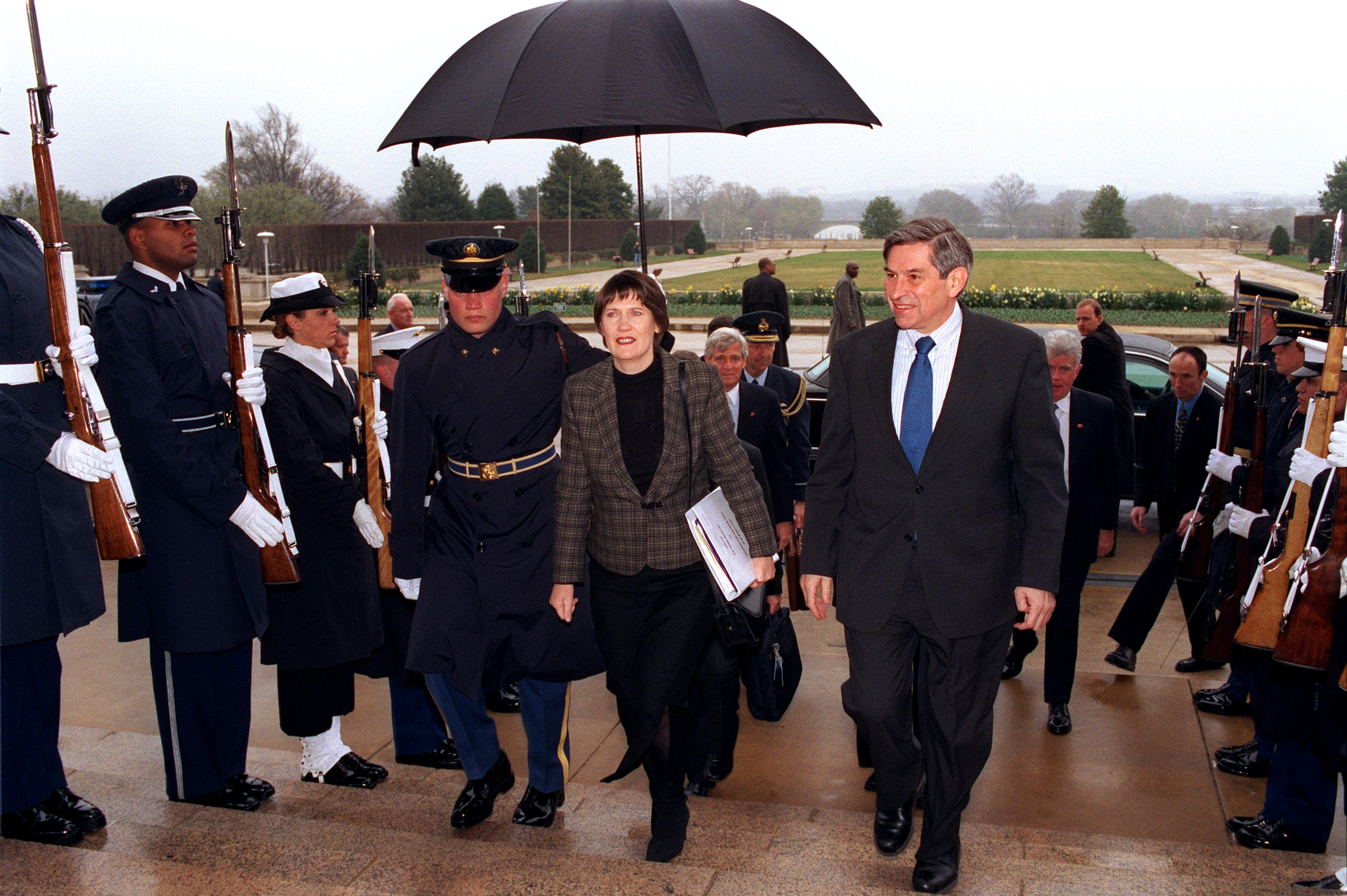

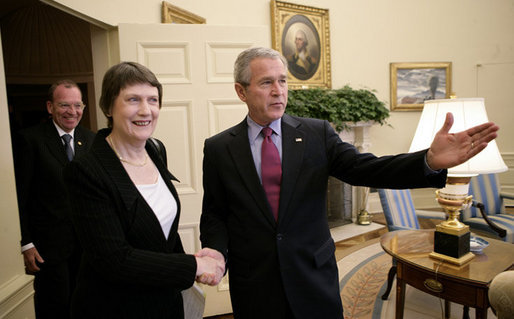

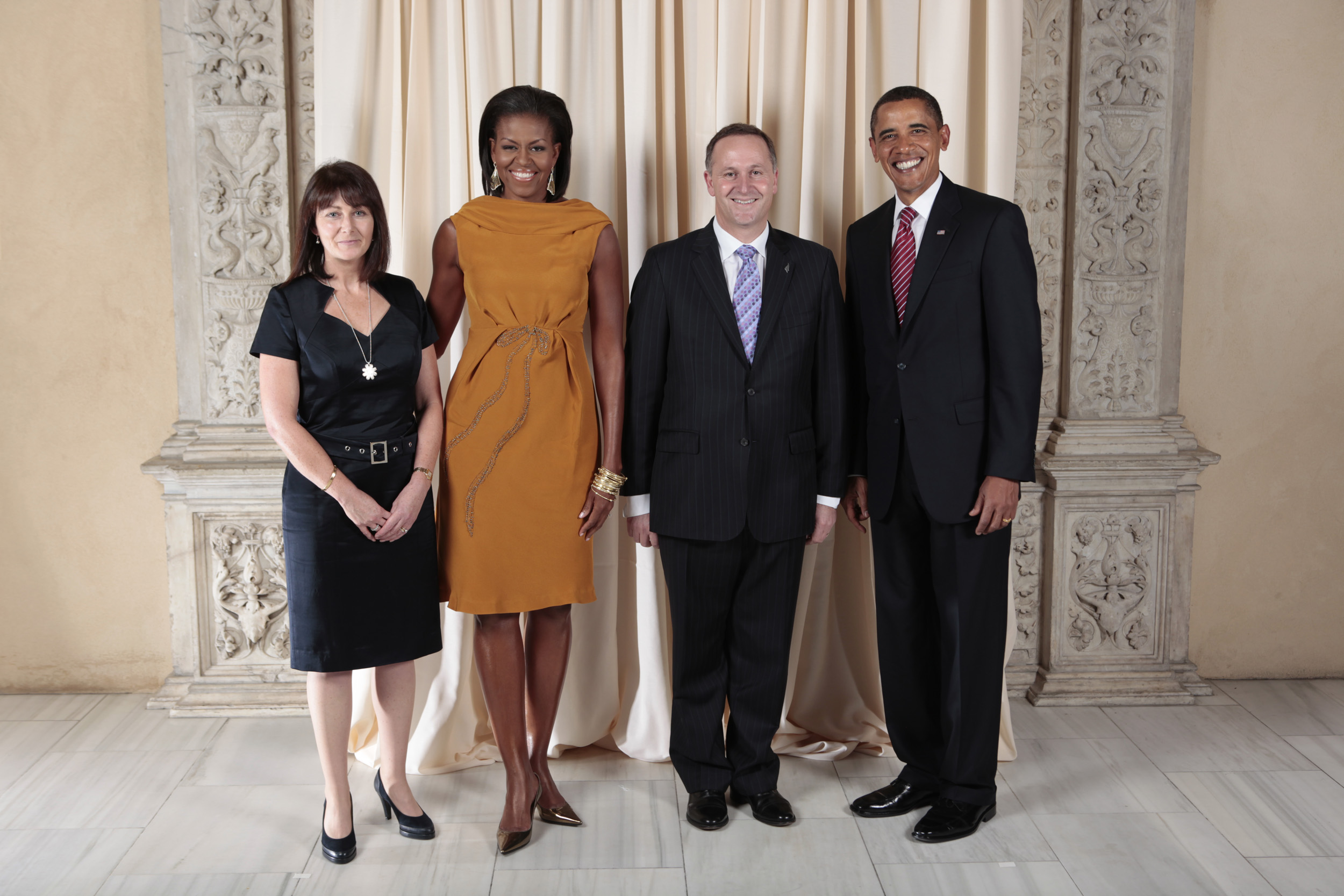

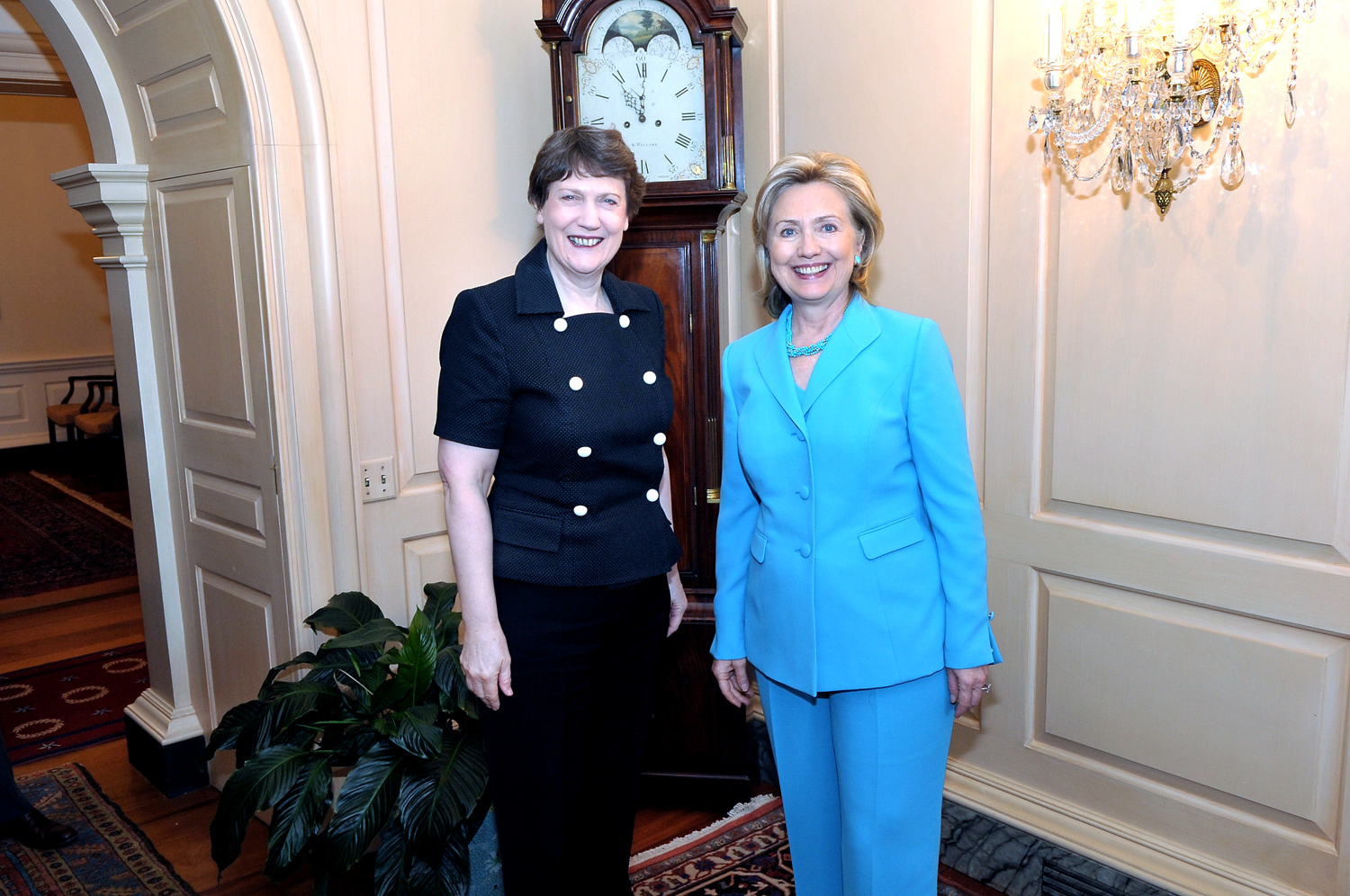

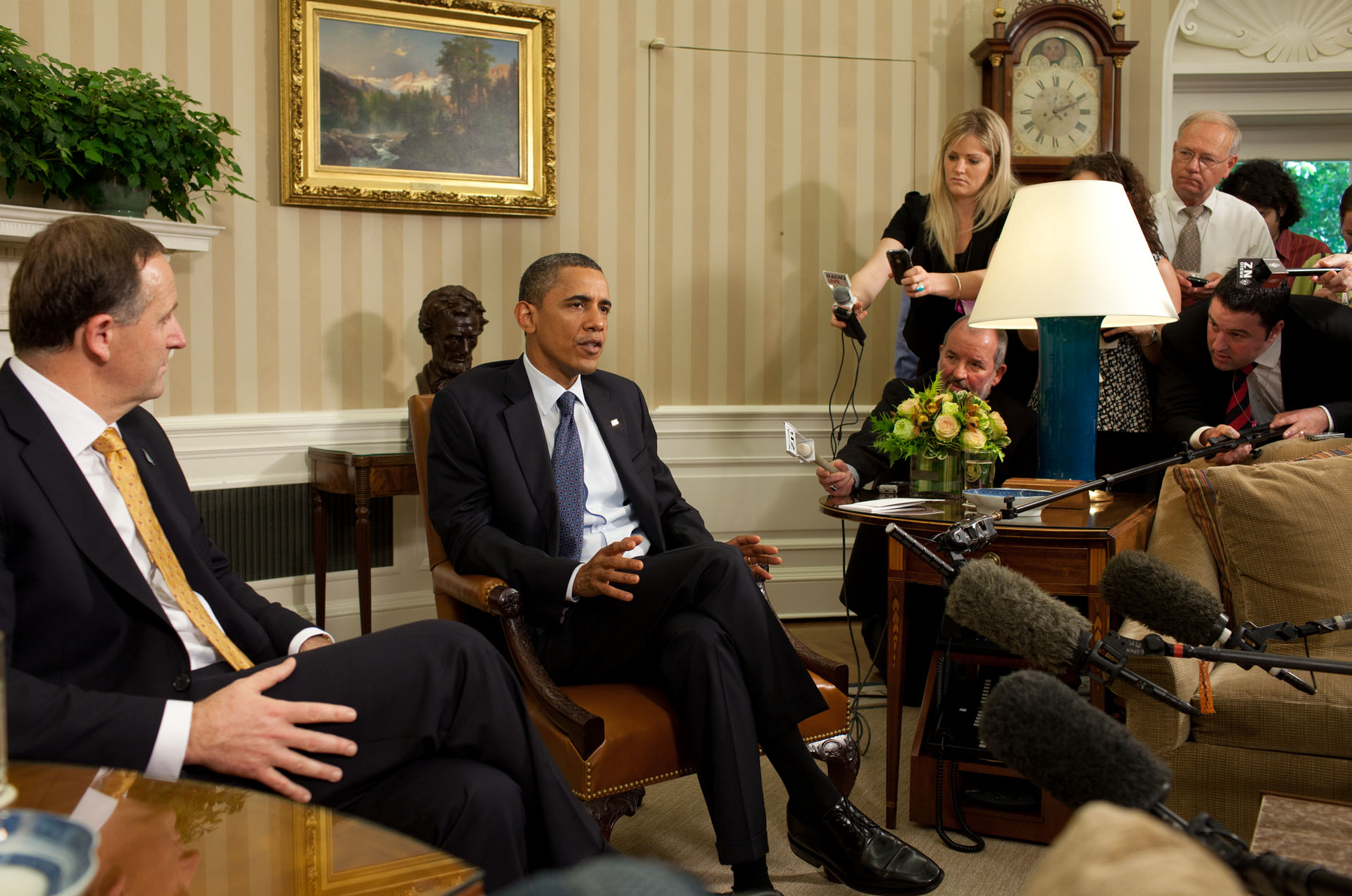

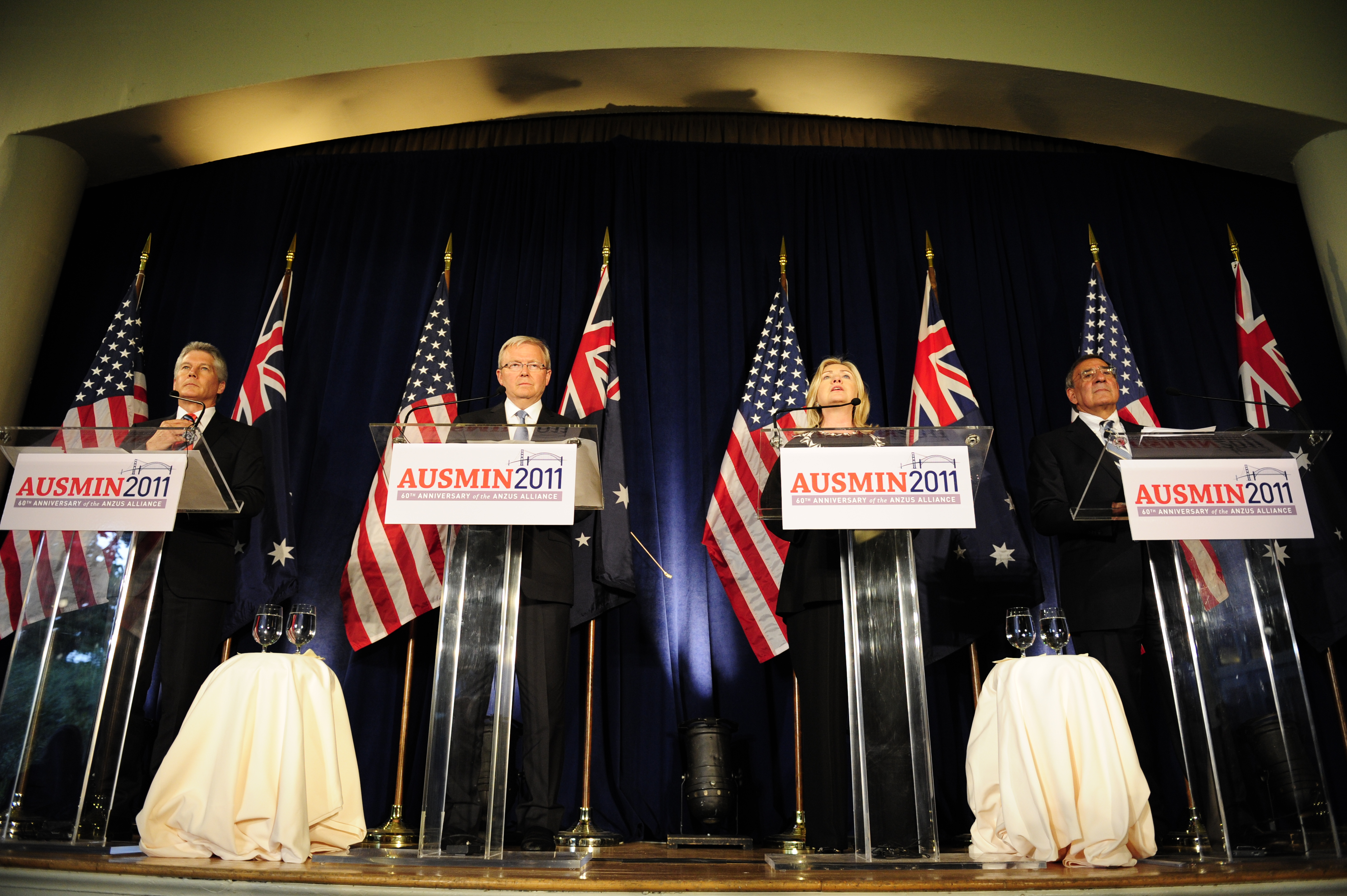

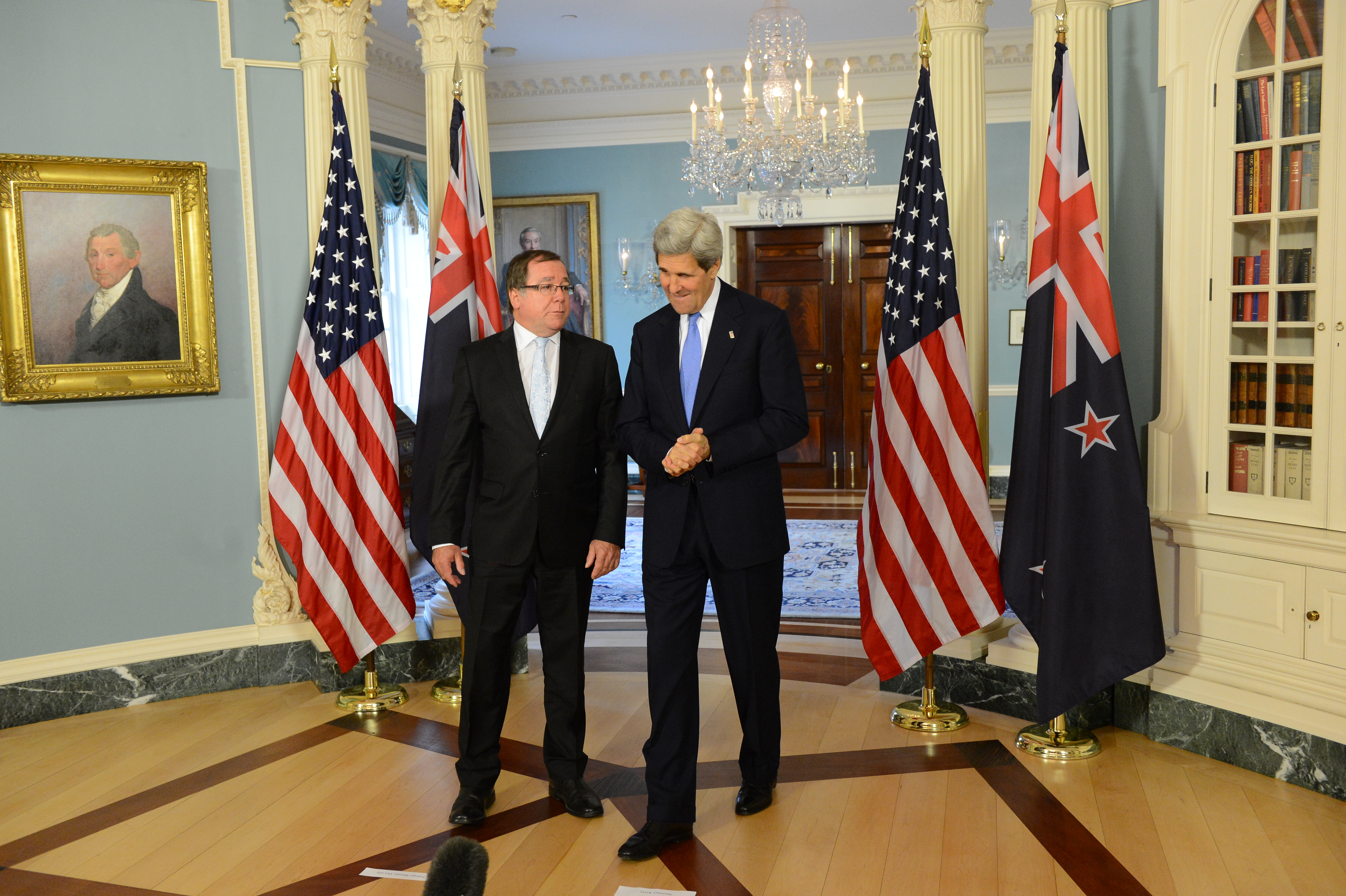

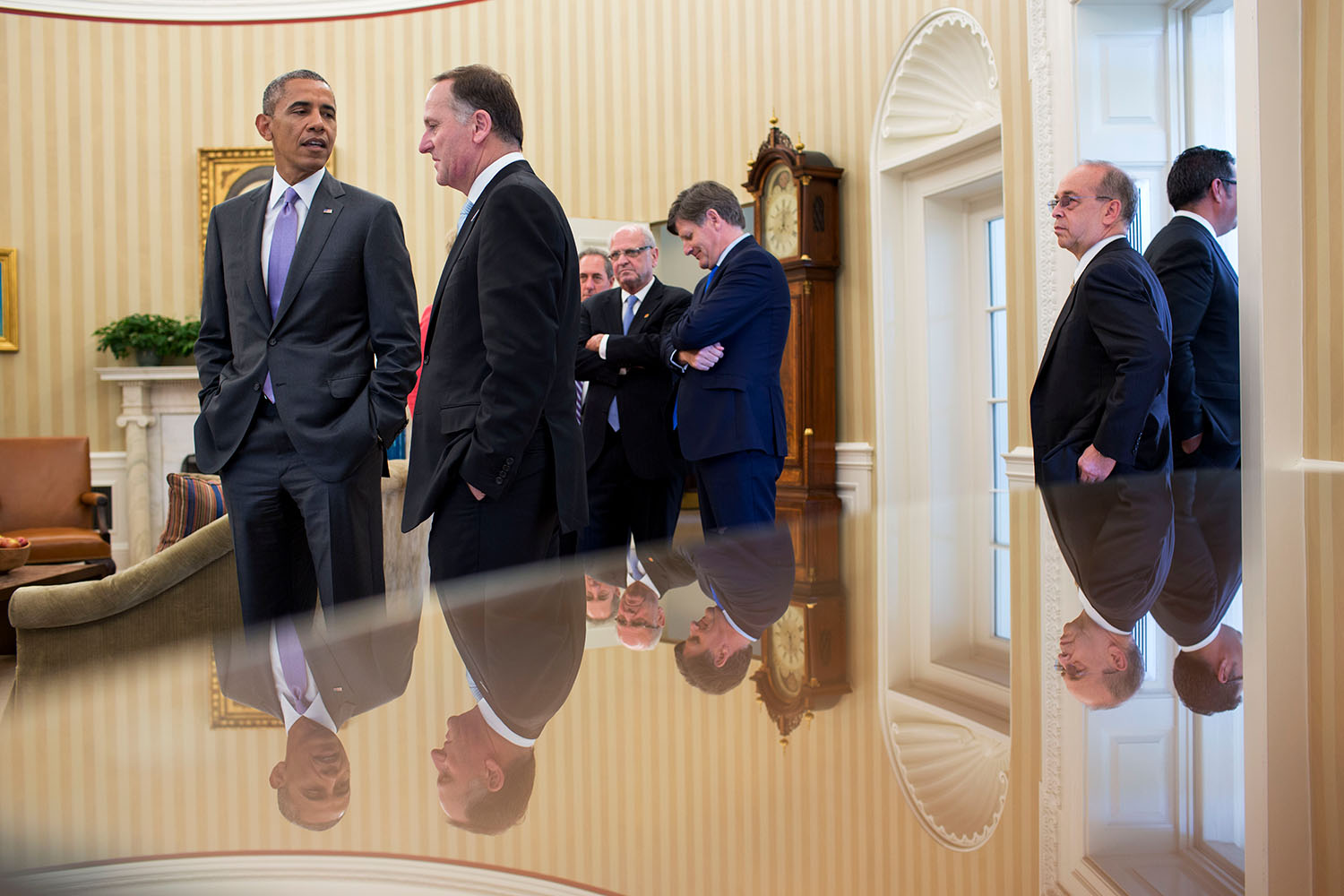

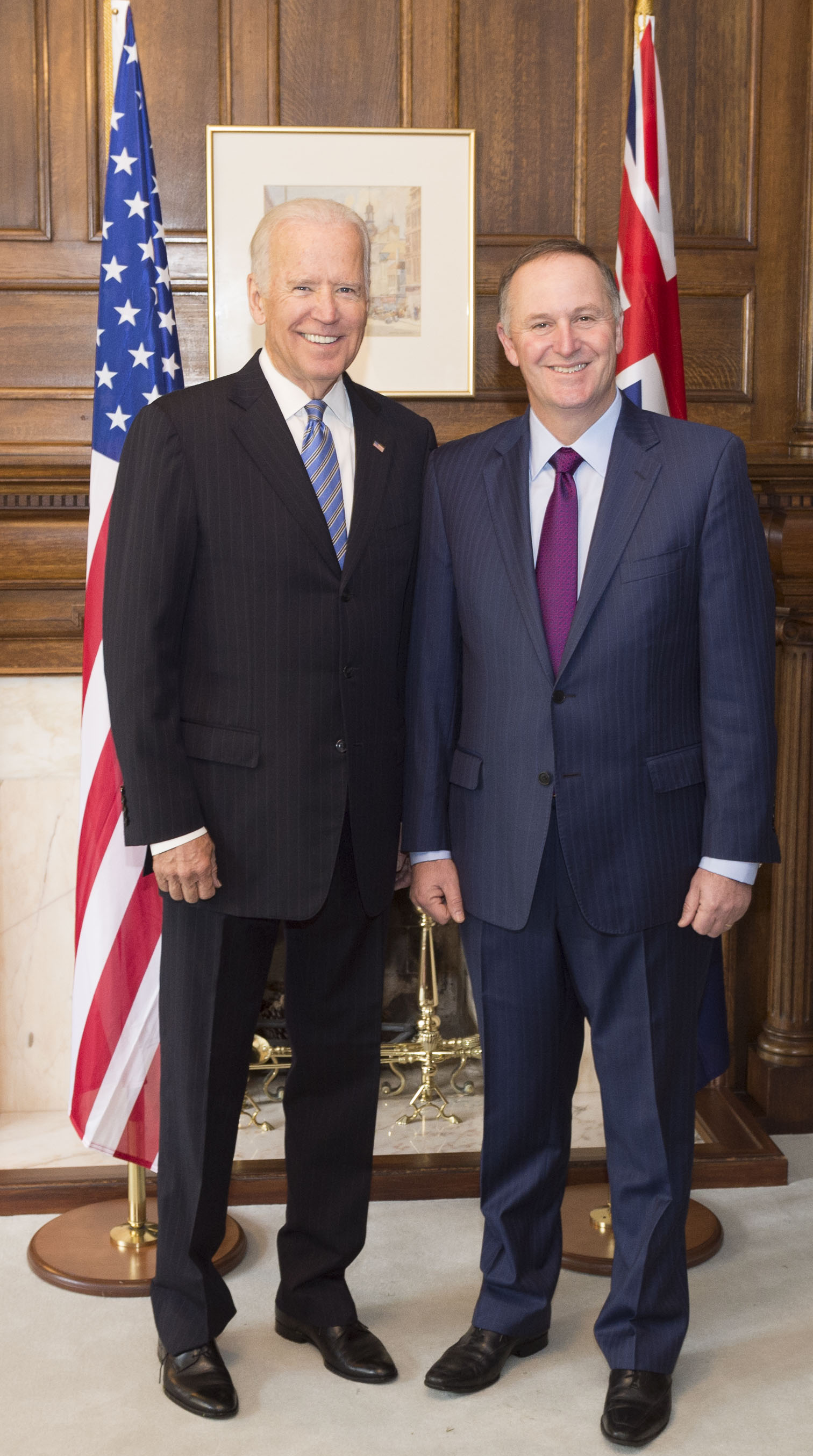

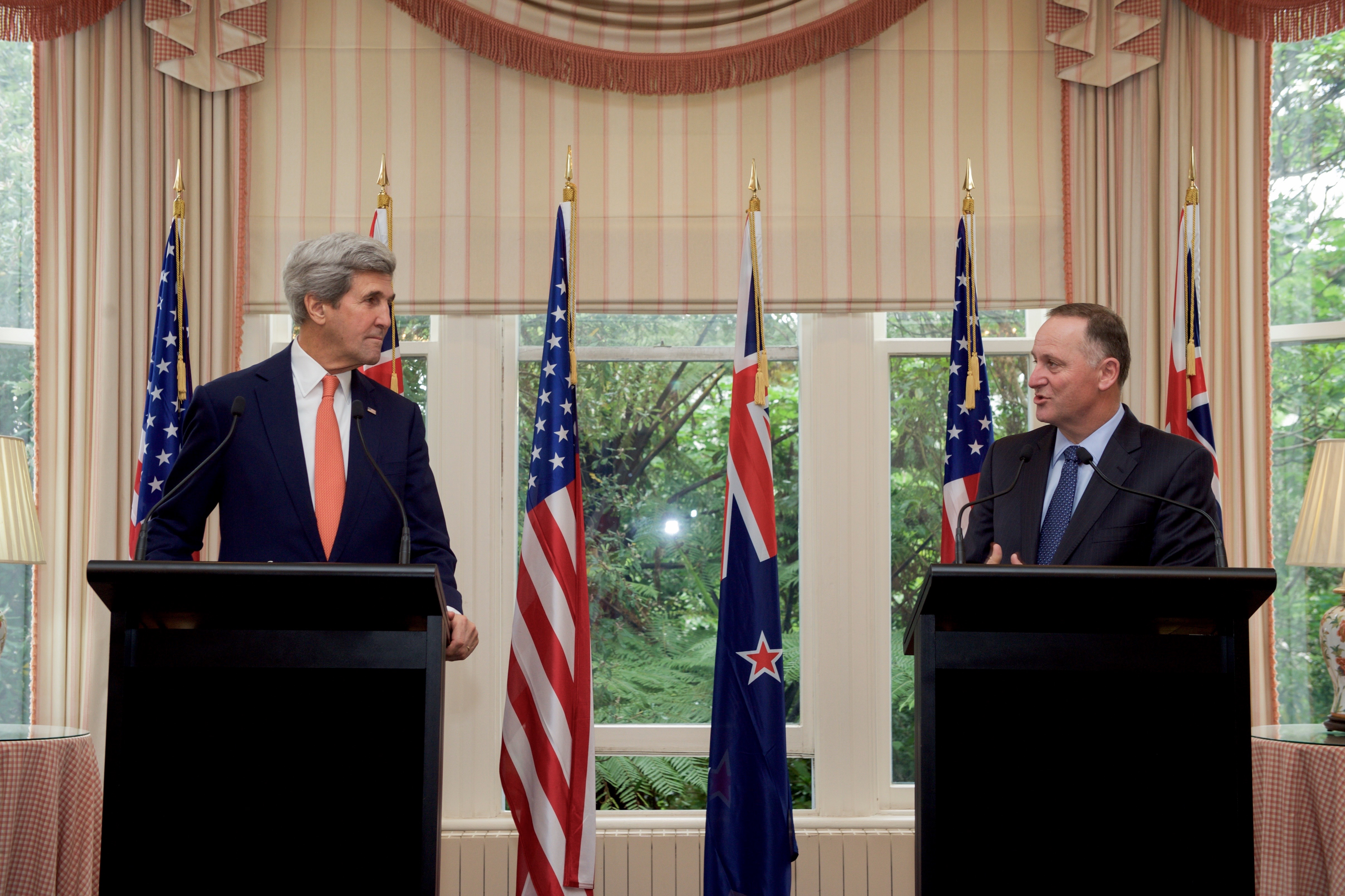

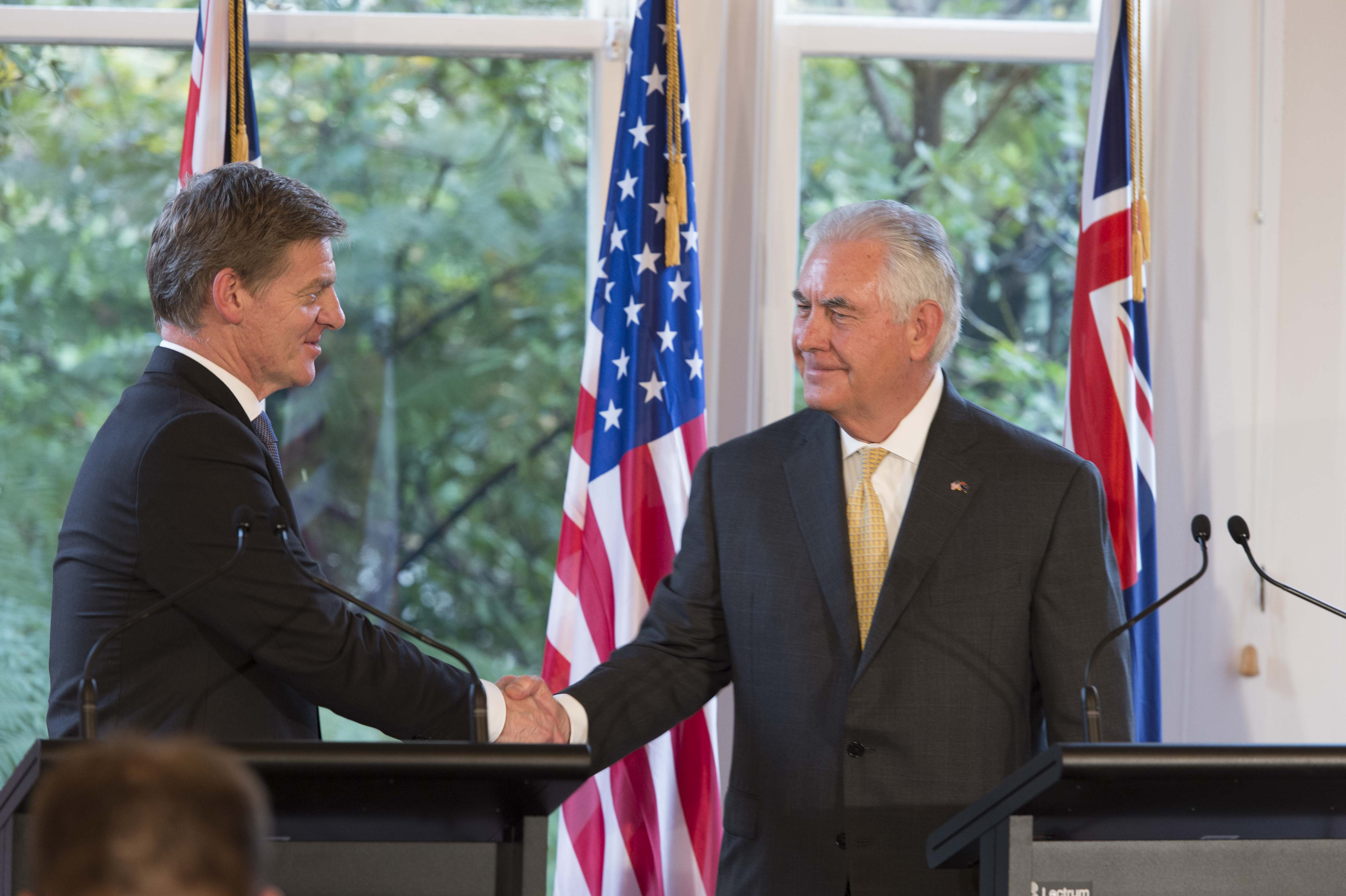

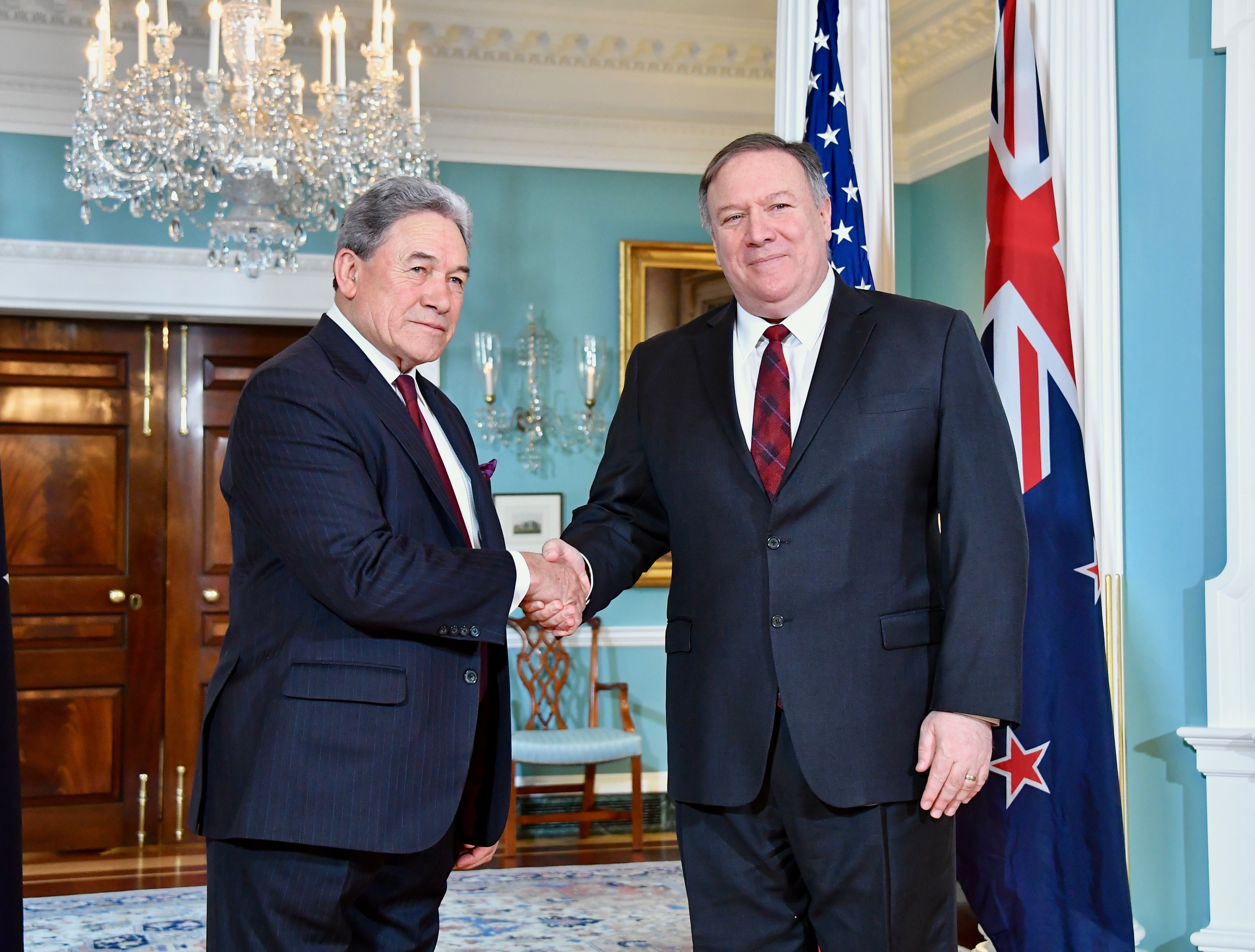

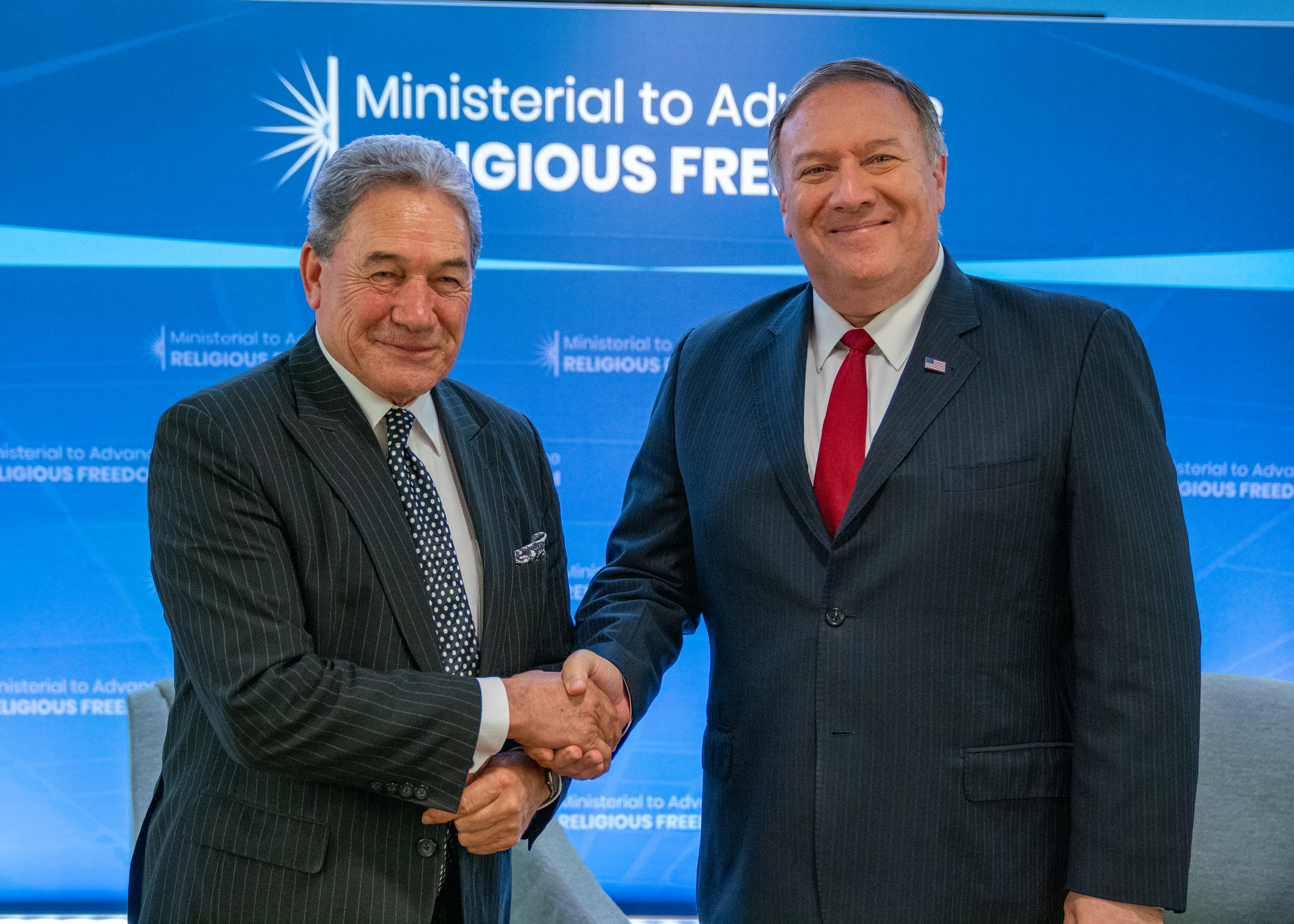

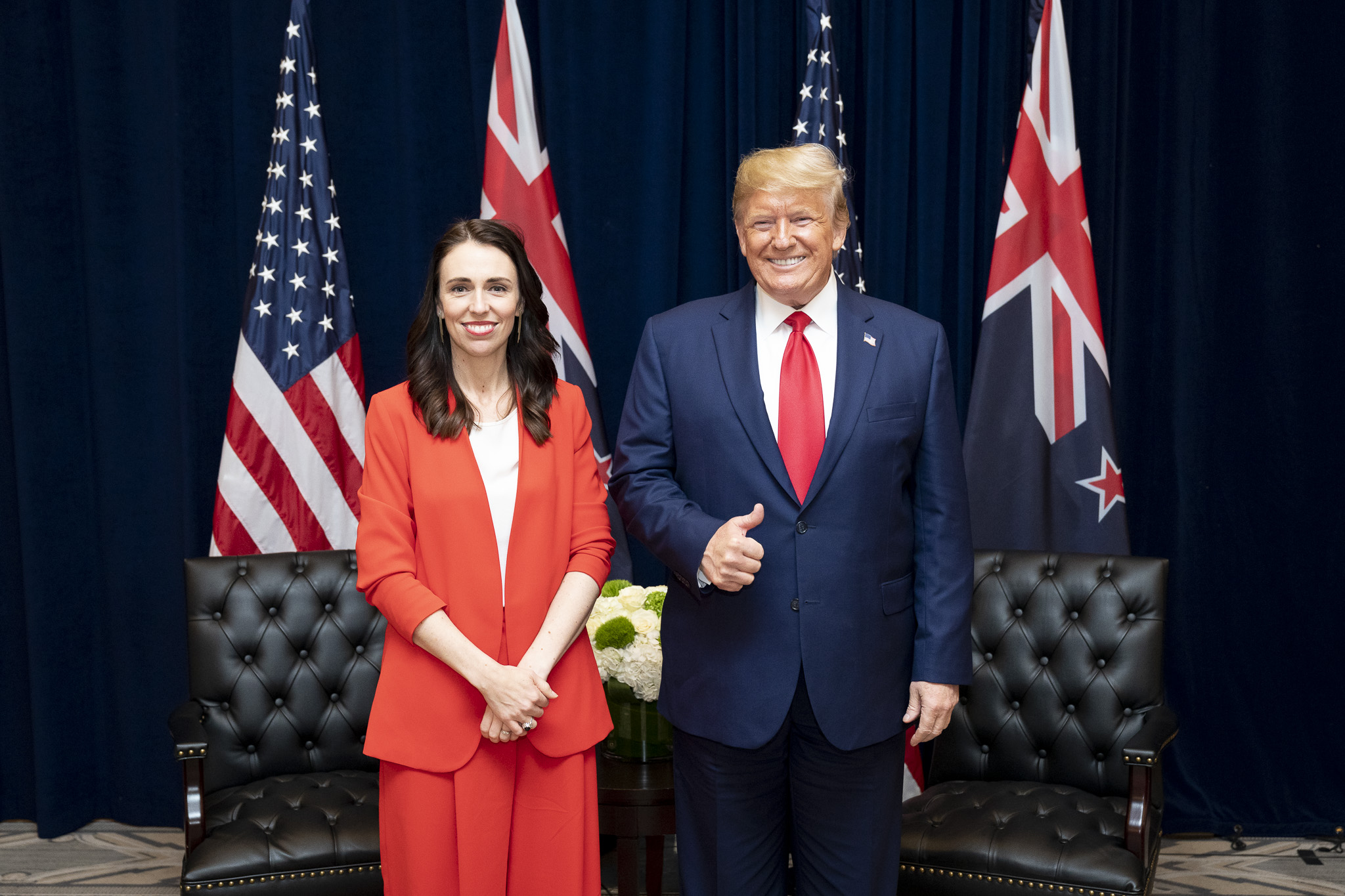

== Niue ==
Table of Trips
Start	End	Guest	Title	Reason
September 25, 2023	September 25, 2023	Dalton Tagelagi	Prime Minister	Attended the Pacific Islands Countries Summit.

== Palau ==
Table of Trips
Start	End	Guest	Title	Reason
November 23, 1998	November 23, 1998	Kuniwo Nakamura	President	Met with President Clinton at Agana, Guam.
May 21, 2019	May 21, 2019	Thomas Remengesau Jr.	President	Working Visit (Leaders of the Freely Associated States).
September 28, 2022	September 28, 2022	Surangel Whipps Jr.	President	Attended the U.S.-Pacific Island Country Summit.
September 25, 2023	September 25, 2023	Surangel Whipps Jr.	President	Attended the Pacific Islands Countries Summit.
September 24, 2024	September 24, 2024	Surangel Whipps Jr.	President	Met with President Biden at the UN General Assembly in New York City.

== Papua New Guinea ==
Table of Trips
Start	End	Guest	Title	Reason
May 7, 1990	May 7, 1990	Rabbie Namaliu	Prime Minister	Private visit.
October 27, 1990	October 27, 1990	Rabbie Namaliu	Prime Minister	Attended Pacific Island Nations-United States Summit in Honolulu, Hawaii
November 10, 2011	November 13, 2011	Peter O'Neill	Prime Minister	Attended the Asia-Pacific Economic Cooperation Summit at Honolulu and Kapolei, Hawaii.
September 28, 2022	September 28, 2022	James Marape	Prime Minister	Attended the U.S.-Pacific Island Country Summit.
September 25, 2023	September 25, 2023	James Marape	Prime Minister	Attended the Pacific Islands Countries Summit.
November 12, 2023	November 17, 2023	James Marape	Prime Minister	Attended the APEC Leaders' Summit at San Francisco, California.

== Samoa ==
Table of Trips
Start	End	Guest	Title	Reason
October 27, 1990	October 27, 1990	Tofilau Eti Alesana	Prime Minister	Attended Pacific Island Nations-United States Summit in Honolulu, Hawaii
September 28, 2022	September 28, 2022	Fiamē Naomi Mataʻafa	Prime Minister	Attended the U.S.-Pacific Island Country Summit.
September 25, 2023	September 25, 2023	Fiamē Naomi Mataʻafa	Prime Minister	Attended the Pacific Islands Countries Summit.

== Solomon Islands ==
Table of Trips
Start	End	Guest	Title	Reason
September 22, 1978	September 22, 1978	Peter Kenilorea	Prime Minister	Private visit.
September 28, 2022	September 28, 2022	Manasseh Sogavare	Prime Minister	Attended the U.S.-Pacific Island Country Summit.

== Tonga ==
Table of Trips
Start	End	Guest	Title	Reason
May 20, 2012	May 21, 2012	Sialeʻataongo Tuʻivakanō	Prime Minister	Attended the NATO Summit meeting in Chicago
September 28, 2022	September 28, 2022	Siaosi Sovaleni	Prime Minister	Attended the U.S.-Pacific Island Country Summit.
September 25, 2023	September 25, 2023	Siaosi Sovaleni	Prime Minister	Attended the Pacific Islands Countries Summit.

== Tuvalu ==
Table of Trips
Start	End	Guest	Title	Reason
October 27, 1990	October 27, 1990	Bikenibeu Paeniu	Prime Minister	Working visit. Arrived in the U.S.April 20. Also visited New York City and Chicago. Departed the U.S.April 24.
September 28, 2022	September 28, 2022	Kausea Natano	Prime Minister	Attended the U.S.-Pacific Island Country Summit.
September 25, 2023	September 25, 2023	Kausea Natano	Prime Minister	Attended the Pacific Islands Countries Summit.

== See also ==
- Foreign policy of the United States
- Foreign relations of the United States
- List of international trips made by presidents of the United States
- List of diplomatic visits to the United States
- State visit
