= Deputy Mayor of London =

Executive officer within the Greater London Authority

Deputy Mayors of London
- Coat of arms of the Greater London Authority
- Member of: Greater London Authority; London Mayoral Cabinet
- Seat: City Hall, London
- Appointer: Mayor of London
- Constituting instrument: Greater London Authority Act 1999, s 2(1)(a)
- Inaugural holder: Nicky Gavron
- Website: www.london.gov.uk/about-us/mayor-london

A Deputy Mayor is a member of the London Mayoral cabinet, in the executive arm of the Greater London Authority. They serve as political advisors with responsibilities and powers corresponding to portfolios delegated by the Mayor. One of them must be designated as the Statutory Deputy Mayor, a member of the London Assembly who serves as the temporary Mayor during a vacancy or temporary incapacity of the Mayor.

== History ==
Colour key (for political parties): Labour Conservative Green Independent

Current or final office holders of a mayoralty are highlighted in bold.

=== Livingstone mayoralties ===
The 2000 London mayoral election was won by Ken Livingstone, who ran as an independent after being expelled from the Labour Party. He announced that he would rotate the position of deputy mayor equally between the four parties represented in the London Assembly (London Labour, London Conservatives, London Liberal Democrats and the London Green Party). He offered the role to Nicky Gavron of the Labour Party for the first year. Initially Labour rejected any offer for the position of Deputy Mayor unless he withdrew from confronting the government over funding for the Tube. Gavron later accepted.

However, in 2001, Livingstone decided not to offer the role to the Conservatives, claiming it would be disruptive, so Nicky Gavron retained the post. In 2002, the Liberal Democrats were asked to nominate a candidate but declined, saying that it would be better to scrutinise the mayor from an independent position. Gavron remained in the role, In 2003, the Greens accepted an offer to nominate a deputy mayor and selected Jenny Jones, who became London's second deputy mayor.

In 2002, Gavron was originally chosen as the Labour candidate for the 2004 London mayoral election. Gavron stepped aside when Livingstone was invited to rejoin the party. They then ran on a joint ticket as Labour's candidates for the posts of mayor and deputy mayor.

In his first term, Livingstone came under fire for delegating his powers to his chief of staff, Simon Fletcher, rather than the deputy mayor on several occasions.

First Livingstone mayoralty
Portfolio	Deputy Mayor	Term
Statutory Deputy Mayor	Nicky Gavron AM	2000–2003
Statutory Deputy Mayor	Jenny Jones AM	2003–2004

Nicky Gavron served as Livingstone's deputy for the duration of his second term.

Second Livingstone Mayoralty
Portfolio	Deputy Mayor	Term
Statutory Deputy Mayor	Nicky Gavron AM	2004–2008

=== Johnson mayoralties ===
After Boris Johnson became Mayor of London in May 2008, he appointed Richard Barnes as his statutory Deputy Mayor, with the specific responsibility for community cohesion and regeneration. However, he also gave the title of Deputy Mayor to several other people, each with a specific role: Ian Clement (Government Relations); Kit Malthouse (Policing); and Ray Lewis (Young People).

Sir Simon Milton, a former councillor, served as Deputy Mayor of Policy and Planning and Chief of Staff to Johnson until his death in office in 2011. In May 2011, Sir Edward Lister was then appointed as his successor. Richard Barnes ceased to be Deputy Mayor on 4 May 2012, when he lost his seat in the Assembly. Victoria Borwick succeeded him in the post.

First Johnson mayoral cabinet
Portfolio	Deputy Mayor	Term
Statutory Deputy Mayor; Communities, Cohesion and Regeneration	Richard Barnes AM	2008–2012
Policing	Kit Malthouse AM	2008–2012
Policy and Planning	Simon Milton	2008–2011
Policy and Planning	Edward Lister	2011–2012
Young People	Ray Lewis	2008
Government and External Relations	Ian Clement	2008–2009

Borwick resigned in May 2015, following her election as Member of Parliament for Kensington, being succeeded by Roger Evans.

Second Johnson mayoral cabinet
Portfolio	Deputy Mayor	Term
Statutory Deputy Mayor	Victoria Borwick AM	2012–2015
Statutory Deputy Mayor	Roger Evans AM	2015–2016
Business and Enterprise	Kit Malthouse AM	2012–2015
Housing, Land and Property	Richard Blakeway	2012–2016
Policing and Crime	Stephen Greenhalgh	2012–2016
Policy and Planning	Edward Lister	2012–2016
Education and Culture	Munira Mirza	2012–2016
Transport	Isabel Dedring	2012–2016

=== Khan mayoralties ===
The 2016 London mayoral election was won by Sadiq Khan for London Labour. Following the election, he appointed Joanne McCartney Statutory Deputy Mayor, along with nine additional deputy mayors, making Khan the first mayor to use all ten available Deputy Mayor spots.

==== First Khan mayoralty ====
First Khan mayoral cabinet
Portfolio	Deputy Mayor	Term
Statutory Deputy Mayor; Education and Childcare	Joanne McCartney AM	2016–2021
Policing and Crime	Sophie Linden	2016–2024
Housing and Residential Development	James Murray	2016–2019
Housing and Residential Development	Tom Copley AM	2020–2021
Fire and Resilience	Fiona Twycross, Baroness Twycross AM	2018–2021
Planning, Regeneration and Skills	Jules Pipe	2016–2021
Social Integration, Social Mobility, Community Engagement	Matthew Ryder	2016–2018
Social Integration, Social Mobility, Community Engagement	Deborah Weekes-Bernard	2018–2021
Business	Rajesh Agrawal	2016–2021
Culture and Creative Industries	Justine Simons	2016–2021
Environment and Energy	Shirley Rodrigues	2016–2021
Transport	Val Shawcross	2016–2018
Transport	Heidi Alexander	2018–2021

==== Second Khan mayoralty ====
Second Khan mayoral cabinet
Portfolio	Deputy Mayor	Term
Statutory Deputy Mayor; Education and Childcare	Joanne McCartney AM	2021–2024
Policing and Crime	Sophie Linden	2021–2024
Fire and Resilience	Fiona Twycross, Baroness Twycross AM	2021–2024
Planning, Regeneration and Skills	Jules Pipe	2021–2024
Social Integration, Social Mobility, Community Engagement	Deborah Weekes-Bernard	2021–2024
Business	Rajesh Agrawal	2021–2023
Business	Howard Dawber	2023–2024
Culture and Creative Industries	Justine Simons	2021–2024
Environment and Energy	Shirley Rodrigues	2021–2024
Transport	Heidi Alexander	2021–2022
Transport	Seb Dance	2022–2024

==== Third Khan mayoralty ====
Third Khan mayoral cabinet
Portfolio	Deputy Mayor	Term
Statutory Deputy Mayor; Education and Childcare	Joanne McCartney AM	2024–present
Policing and Crime	Kaya Comer-Schwartz	2024–present
Housing and Residential Development	Tom Copley AM	2024–present
Planning, Regeneration and the Fire Service	Jules Pipe	2016–present
Social Integration, Social Mobility, Community Engagement	Deborah Weekes-Bernard	2018–present
Business	Howard Dawber	2023–present
Culture and Creative Industries	Justine Simons	2016–present
Environment and Energy	Mete Coban	2024–present
Transport	Seb Dance	2022–present
