= Mayoralty of Boris Johnson =

2008–2016 mayoralty in London

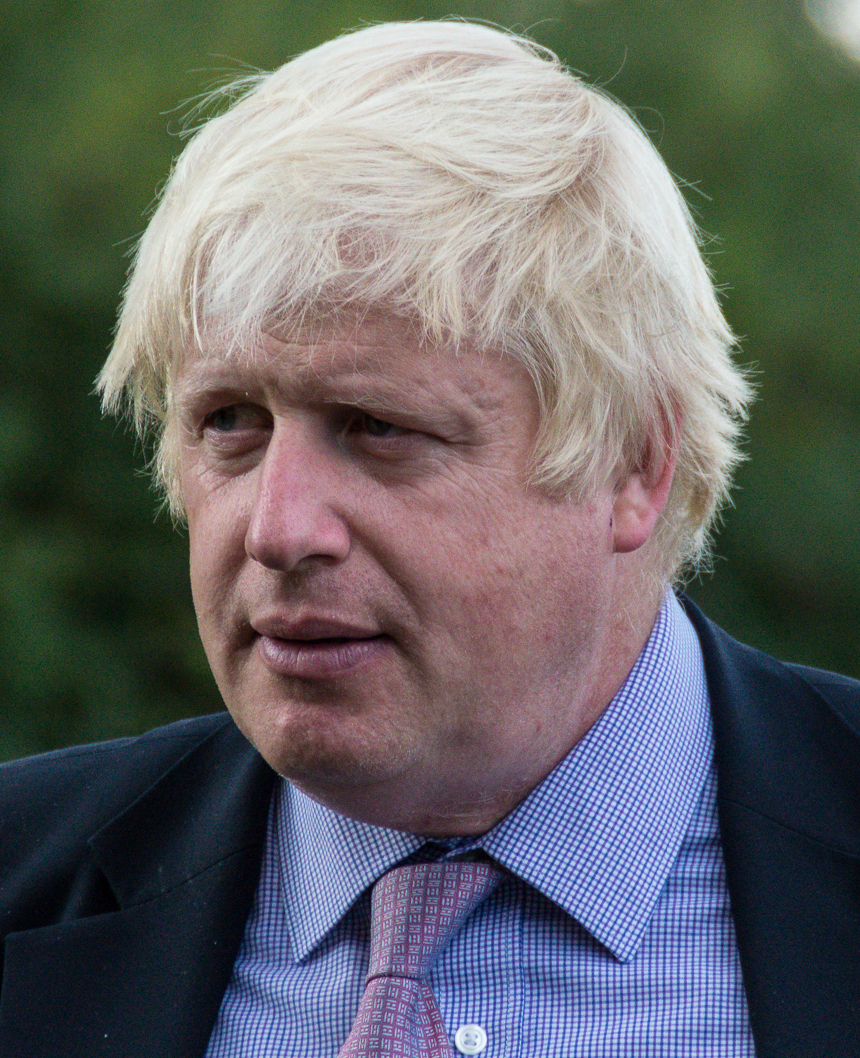
- Johnson in 2014
- Mayoralty of Boris Johnson; 3 May 2008 – 9 May 2016
- Mayor: Boris Johnson
- Party: Conservative
- Election: 2008 and 2012

Boris Johnson served as mayor of London from 1 May 2008 until 5 May 2016, being elected in 2008 and reelected in 2012. During his mayoralty, Johnson oversaw the preparations and hosting of the 2012 Summer Olympics and oversaw the cycle hire scheme. He also introduced the New Routemaster buses and the Thames cable car, while promoting the proposed Garden Bridge over the River Thames; the project was later abandoned after Johnson left office. Johnson also banned alcohol consumption on much of London's public transport.

Selected as the Conservative candidate for the London mayoral election of 2008, Johnson defeated Labour incumbent Ken Livingstone and resigned his seat as MP for Henley in parliament. During his first term as mayor, he banned alcohol consumption on public transport, introduced the New Routemaster buses and cycle hire scheme, and championed London's financial sector. During his first term, Johnson was embroiled in several personal scandals, but remained a popular figure in London with a strong celebrity status. In the 2012 mayoral election, he was re-elected mayor, again defeating Livingstone. During his second term he oversaw the 2012 Summer Olympics. In the 2015 general election he was elected MP for Uxbridge and South Ruislip, a position he held from 2015 to 2023, and stepped down as mayor in 2016. He was succeeded as mayor by Sadiq Khan of the Labour Party.

Johnson left office still popular with the people of London, with 52% of Londoners believing he did a "good job" as mayor while only 29% believing he did a "bad job". Following his mayoralty, Johnson became a prominent figure in the successful Vote Leave campaign to withdraw the United Kingdom from the European Union, served as foreign secretary under Theresa May from 2016 to 2018, and served as Prime Minister of the United Kingdom and Leader of the Conservative Party from 2019 to 2022.

== 2008 mayoral election ==
In July 2007, Boris Johnson announced his candidacy to be the Conservative candidate for Mayor of London in the 2008 mayoral election and in September was selected after gaining 79% of the vote in a public London-wide primary.

Johnson's mayoral campaign focused on reducing youth crime, making public transport safer, and replacing the articulated buses with an updated version of the AEC Routemaster. Targeting the Conservative-leaning suburbs of outer London, it capitalised on perceptions that the Labour Mayoralty had neglected them in favour of inner London. His campaign emphasised his popularity, even among those who opposed his policies, with opponents complaining that a common attitude among voters was: "I'm voting for Boris because he is a laugh". The campaign of Labour incumbent Ken Livingstone portrayed Johnson as an out-of-touch toff and bigot, citing racist and homophobic language used in his column; Johnson responded that these quotes had been taken out of context and were meant as satire.

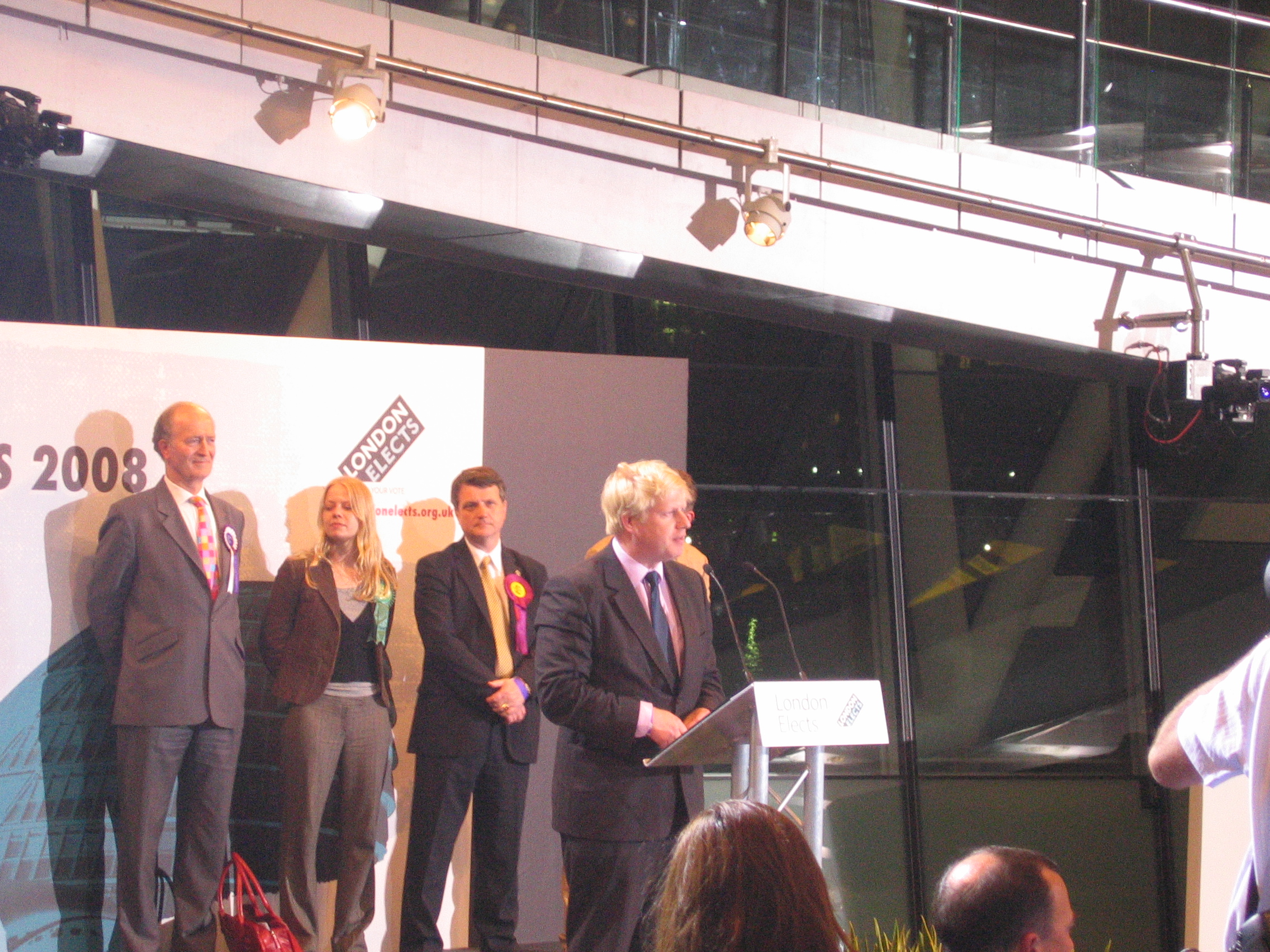
Johnson gave a victory speech in City Hall after being elected as Mayor of London.

In the election, Johnson received 43% and Livingstone 37% of first-preference votes; when second-preference votes were added, Johnson proved victorious with 53% to Livingstone's 47%. Johnson then announced his resignation as MP for Henley.

== First term ==
Johnson was sworn in as mayor on 3 May 2008. Settling into the City Hall mayoral office, Johnson's first official engagement was an appearance at the Sikh celebrations for Vaisakhi in Trafalgar Square. He received criticism during the early weeks of his administration, largely because he was late for two official functions in his first week on the job, and because after three weeks he went on holiday to Turkey. In July 2008, Johnson visited the closing ceremony of the 2008 Summer Olympics in Beijing, where he offended his Chinese hosts with his attire by failing to button his suit jacket.

While Johnson made no major changes to the mayoral system as developed by Livingstone, he reversed several measures implemented by Livingstone's administration.

During the first Mayoral term, Johnson was perceived as having moved leftward on certain issues, for instance supporting the London Living Wage and endorsing an amnesty for illegal migrants. He tried placating critics who had deemed him a bigot by appearing at London's gay pride parade and praising ethnic minority newspapers. In 2012, he banned London buses from displaying the adverts of Core Issues Trust (a Christian group) which compared homosexuality to an illness. In August 2008, Johnson broke from the traditional protocol of those in public office not publicly commenting on other nations' elections by endorsing Barack Obama for the presidency of the United States.

In 2014, former mayor Ken Livingstone said in an interview with the New Statesman that, while he had once feared Johnson as "the most hardline right-wing ideologue since Thatcher", over the course of Johnson's mayoralty he had instead concluded he was "a fairly lazy tosser who just wants to be there while doing very little work."

=== Staffing of administration ===
Rather than bringing a team of assistants with him when he assumed the mayoral office, as Livingstone had done, Johnson instead assembled his team over the six months after he took office. Those in City Hall who were deemed too closely allied to Livingstone's administration had their employment terminated. Johnson appointed Tim Parker to be first Deputy Mayor, but after Parker began taking increasing control at City Hall and insisted that all staff report directly to him, Johnson dismissed him. As a result of these problems, many in the Conservative Party initially distanced themselves from Johnson's administration, fearing that it would be counter-productive to achieving a Conservative victory in the 2010 general election.

In June 2008, Johnson fired his chief political director James McGrath over offensive remarks McGrath made about Afro-Caribbean people. In July, Johnson fired Ray Lewis, one of his deputy mayors, over a false magistrate claim.

=== Policing ===
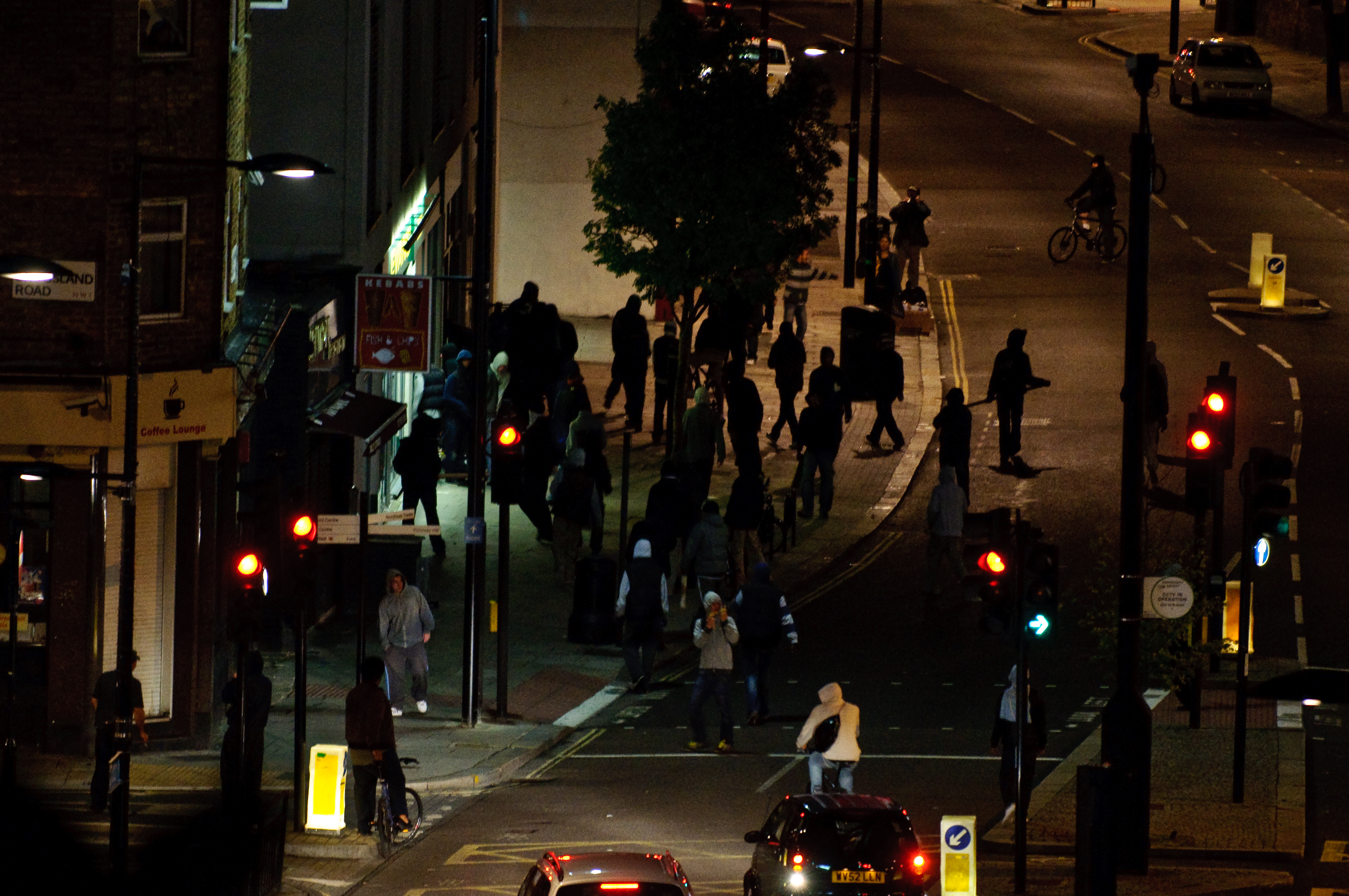
Johnson's response to the 2011 London riots was criticised.

Johnson appointed himself chair of the Metropolitan Police Authority (MPA), and in October 2008 successfully pushed for the resignation of Metropolitan Police Commissioner Ian Blair after the latter was criticised for allegedly handing contracts to friends and for his handling of the killing of Jean Charles de Menezes. This earned Johnson great respect among Conservatives, who interpreted it as his first act of strength. Johnson resigned as MPA chairman in January 2010, but throughout his mayoralty was highly supportive of the Metropolitan Police, particularly during the controversy surrounding the death of Ian Tomlinson. Overall crime in London fell during his administration, but his claim that serious youth crime had decreased was shown to be false, and he acknowledged the error. Similarly, his claim that Metropolitan Police numbers had increased was also characterised as untrue, but the fact-checkers at Full Fact say that both Johnson's and his critics' positions are defensible. He was also criticised for his response to the 2011 London riots; holidaying with his family in British Columbia when the rioting broke out, he did not immediately return to London, only returning 48 hours after it had begun and addressing Londoners 60 hours thereafter. Upon visiting shopkeepers and residents affected by the riots in Clapham, he was booed and jeered by elements within the crowds.

After Johnson took office, he had the MPA incense stop and search. A 2016 report commissioned by the Home Office found "no discernible crime-reducing effects" from this action.

=== Preparations for the 2012 Summer Olympics ===
Three months after his election Johnson attended the 2008 Summer Olympics closing ceremony at Beijing in August 2008 to receive the Olympic Flag from the Mayor of Beijing. Under Livingstone, London had been successful in its bid to host the 2012 Summer Olympics, securing the games in 2005. Johnson's role in the proceedings was to be the co-chair of an Olympic board which oversaw the games. Johnson continued preparations for the 2012 Olympic Games, which had been initiated under Livingstone, and was even accused of taking credit for some of the efforts of Livingstone.

Johnson commissioned for a landmark tower to be constructed in the Olympic Park. This would result in the construction of ArcelorMittal Orbit.

=== Relations with financial sector and the media ===
Johnson championed London's financial sector and denounced what he saw as "banker bashing" following the 2008 financial crisis, condemning the anti-capitalist Occupy London movement that appeared in 2011. He spent much time with those involved in the financial services, and criticised the government's 50p tax rate for higher earners. He collected donations from the city's wealthy for a charitable enterprise, the Mayor's Fund, which he had established to aid disadvantaged youths. It initially announced that it would raise £100 million, but by 2010 it had only spent £1.5 million. He also retained extensive personal contacts throughout the British media, which resulted in widespread favourable press coverage of his administration. In turn he remained largely supportive of his friends in the media – among them Rupert Murdoch – during the News International phone hacking scandal.

The formation of the Forensic Audit Panel was announced on 8 May 2008. The panel is tasked with monitoring and investigating financial management at the London Development Agency and the Greater London Authority. Johnson's announcement was criticised by Labour for the perceived politicisation of this nominally independent panel, who asked whether the appointment of key Johnson allies to the panel – "to dig dirt on Ken Livingstone" – was "an appropriate use of public funds". The head of the panel, Patience Wheatcroft, was married to a Conservative councillor and three of the four remaining panel members also had close links to the Conservatives: Stephen Greenhalgh (Conservative Leader of Hammersmith and Fulham London Borough Council), Patrick Frederick (Chairman of Conservative Business Relations for South East England and Southern London) and Edward Lister (Conservative Leader of Wandsworth London Borough Council).

==== Work for The Telegraph ====
During the electoral campaign, Johnson had confided to Brian Paddick that he was unsure how he would retain his then lifestyle while relying upon the mayoral salary of £140,000 a year. To resolve this problem, he agreed to continue his Telegraph column alongside his mayoral job, thus earning a further £250,000 a year. His team believed that this would cause controversy, and made him promise to donate a fifth of his Telegraph fee to a charitable cause providing bursaries for students. Johnson resented this, and ultimately did not pay a full fifth. Controversy erupted when he was questioned about his Telegraph fee on BBC's HARDtalk; here, he referred to the £250,000 as "chicken feed", something that was widely condemned, given that this was roughly 10 times the average yearly wage for a British worker.

=== Transportation ===
Johnson ended the oil deal that Livingstone had made with Venezuela, in which London provided its expertise in transport and urban planning for subsidised diesel fuel, which had helped to allow London to provide low-income residents with half-priced bus and tram fares. The oil deal had been controversial.

Early in his mayoralty, Johnson ended the half-yearly inspections of black cabs, but this measure was reinstated three years later. In November 2008, Johnson outlined a transport infrastructure investment plan that included the cancelation of the Thames Gateway Bridge.

Johnson abolished the western wing of the congestion charging zone. He also cancelled plans to increase the congestion charge for four-wheel-drive vehicles. He was subsequently accused of failing to publish an independent report on air pollution commissioned by the Greater London Authority, which revealed that the city breached legal limits on nitrogen dioxide levels.

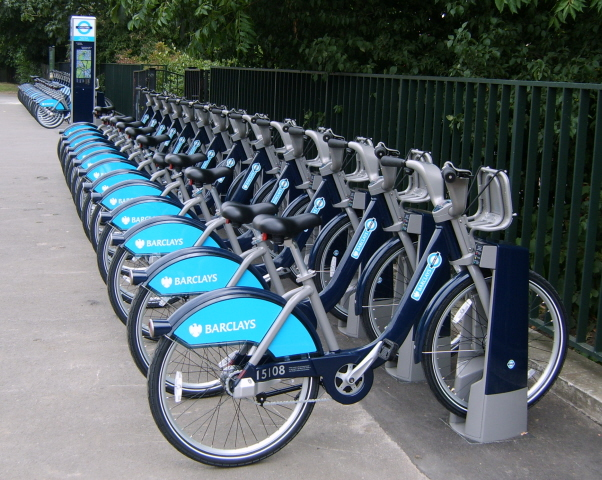
Johnson implemented Livingstone's idea of a public bicycle system; the result was dubbed the "Boris Bike".

Johnson retained Livingstone projects such as Crossrail, but was accused of trying to take credit for them. He introduced a public bicycle scheme that had been considered by Livingstone's administration; colloquially known as "Boris Bikes", the partly privately financed system cost £140 million and was a significant financial loss but proved popular. Despite Johnson's support of cycling in London, and his much-publicised identity as a cyclist, his administration was criticised by some cycling groups who argued that he had failed to make the city's roads safer for cyclists. As per his election pledge, he also commissioned the development of the New Routemaster buses for central London. He also ordered the construction of a cable car system that crossed the River Thames between Greenwich Peninsula and the Royal Docks.

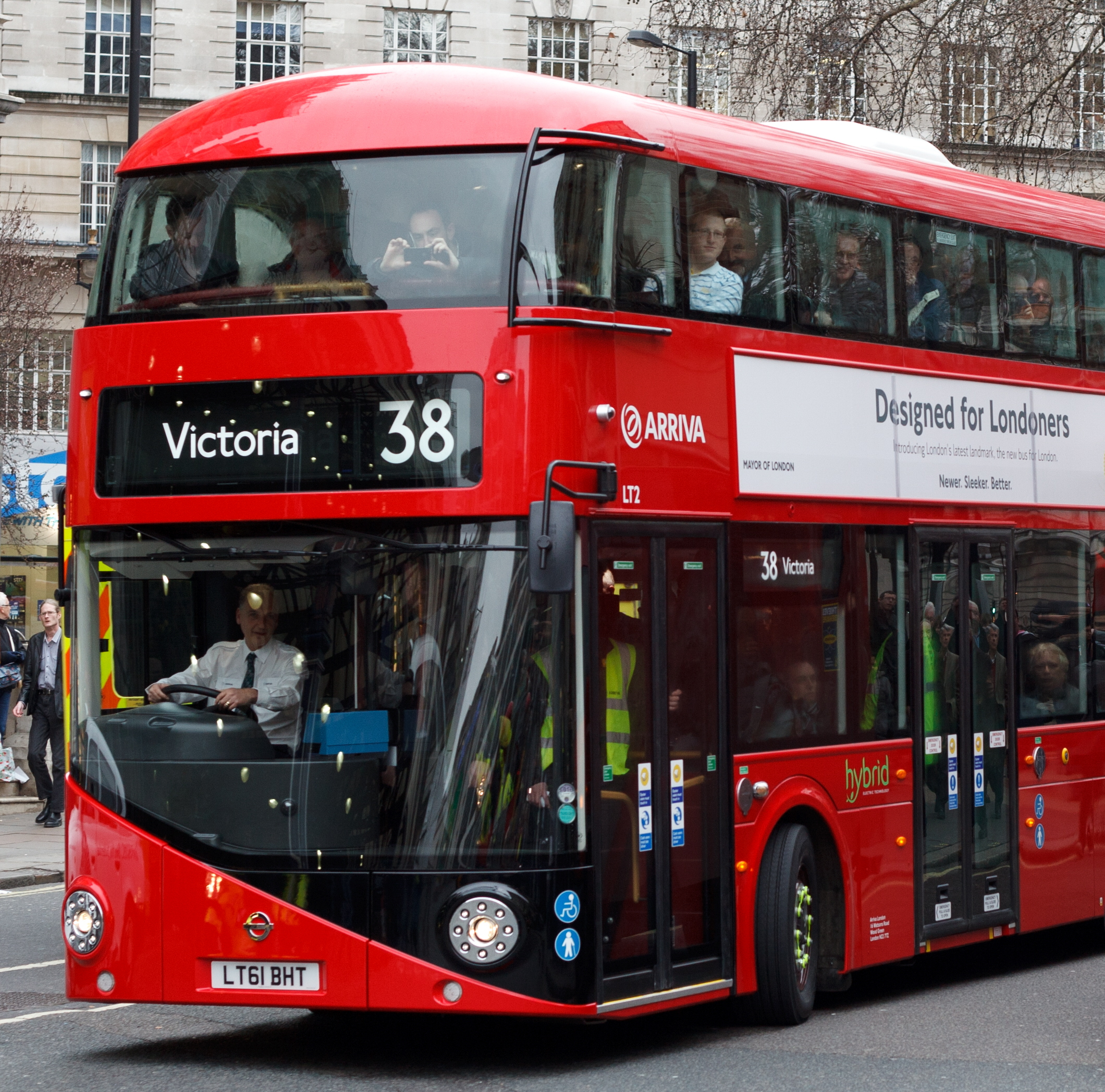
The New Routemaster bus introduced by Johnson's administration

Johnson's first policy initiative was a ban on drinking alcohol on public transport. At the beginning of his tenure as mayor, Johnson announced plans to extend pay-as-you-go Oyster cards to national rail services in London. One of the pledges in Johnson's election manifesto was to retain Tube ticket offices, in opposition to Livingstone's proposal to close up to 40 London Underground ticket offices. On 2 July 2008, the Mayor's office announced that the closure plan was to be abandoned and that offices would remain open. In financing these projects, Johnson's administration borrowed £100 million, while public transport fares were increased by 50%.

=== Other acts ===
Soon after taking office, Johnson ceased the publication of The Londoner newsletter, which had been published by the mayor's office.

=== Public image ===
During his first term, Johnson was embroiled in several personal scandals. After moving to a new house in Islington, he built a shed on his balcony without obtaining planning permission; after neighbours complained, he dismantled the shed. The press also accused him of having an affair with Helen Macintyre and of fathering her child, allegations that he did not deny. Controversy was generated when Johnson was accused of warning the MP Damian Green that police were planning to arrest him; Johnson denied the claims and did not face criminal charges under the Criminal Justice Act. He was accused of cronyism, in particular for appointing Veronica Wadley, a former Evening Standard editor who had supported him, as the chair of London's Arts council when she was widely regarded as not being the best candidate for the position. He was caught up in the parliamentary expenses scandal and accused of excessive personal spending on taxi journeys. His deputy mayor Ian Clement was found to have misused a City Hall credit card, resulting in his resignation.

Johnson remained a popular figure in London with a strong celebrity status. In 2009, he rescued Franny Armstrong from anti-social teenagers who had threatened her while he was cycling past.

=== Re-election campaign ===
Johnson ran for reelection in 2012. Before the election, Johnson published Johnson's Life of London, a work of popular history that the historian A. N. Wilson characterised as a "coded plea" for votes. Polls suggested that while Livingstone's approach to transport was preferred, voters in London placed greater trust in Johnson over issues of crime and the economy. During the 2012 Mayoral election, Johnson sought re-election, while Livingstone was again selected as the Labour candidate. Johnson's campaign emphasised the accusation that Livingstone was guilty of tax evasion, for which Livingstone called Johnson a "bare-faced liar". The political scientist Andrew Crines believed that Livingstone's campaign focused on criticising Johnson rather than presenting an alternate and progressive vision of London's future. In 2012, Johnson was reelected as mayor, again defeating Livingstone.

== Second term ==
In November 2013, Johnson announced major changes to the operation of London Underground, including the extension of Tube operating hours to run through the night at weekends. The announcement also revealed that all staffed Underground ticket offices would be closed with the aim of saving over £40 million a year, with automated ticketing systems provided instead.

=== Hosting of the 2012 Summer Olympics ===
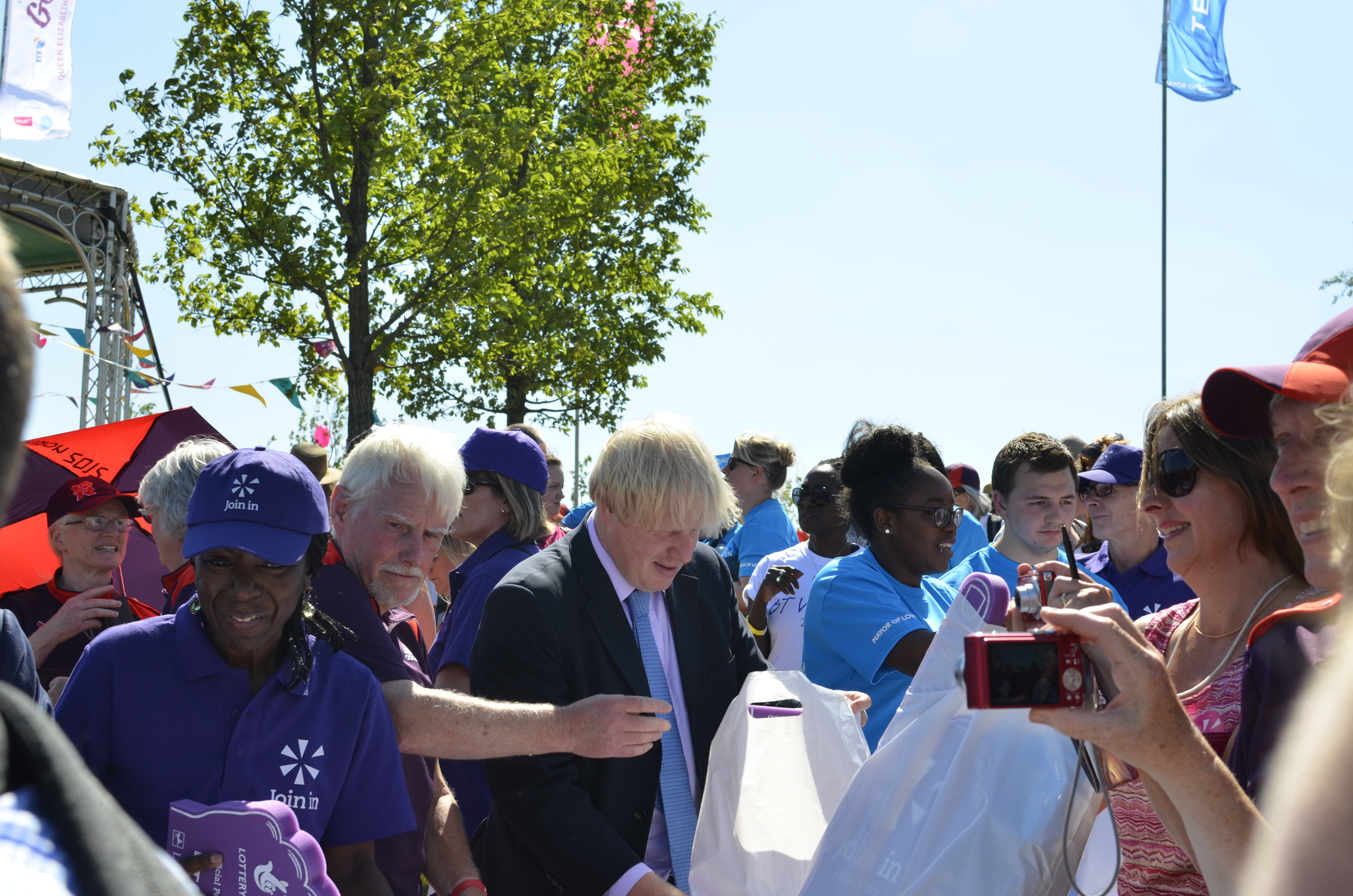
Johnson at the 2012 Summer Olympics

In July 2012, after Mitt Romney, the Republican Party presidential nominee in the 2012 United States presidential election (and former head of the 2002 Winter Olympics host committee), said in an interview that London was not ready in their preparations, Johnson publicly lambasted Romney.

At an August 2012 event in Victoria Park promoting the then-upcoming games, Johnson became stuck while riding on a zip line.

Ahead of the Olympics, Johnson sought to improve the transport around London by making more tickets available and laying on more buses around the capital during the busy period, when thousands of spectators were temporary visitors in London. Johnson was accused of covering up pollution ahead of the games by deploying dust suppressants to remove air particulates near monitoring stations.

After the 2012 Summer Olympic and 2012 Summer Paralympic Games, Johnson struck a deal for West Ham United to occupy a significantly renovated Olympic Stadium. This came despite the Olympic bid having outlined that the stadium would be downsized to a 25,000 seat athletics stadium. A 2017 report by the accounting firm Moore Stephens found that the £323 million cost the post-games renovation of the stadium would not be recovered, and predicted that the stadium would continue to run as much as a £20 million annual deficit.

=== Relationship with Jennifer Arcuri ===
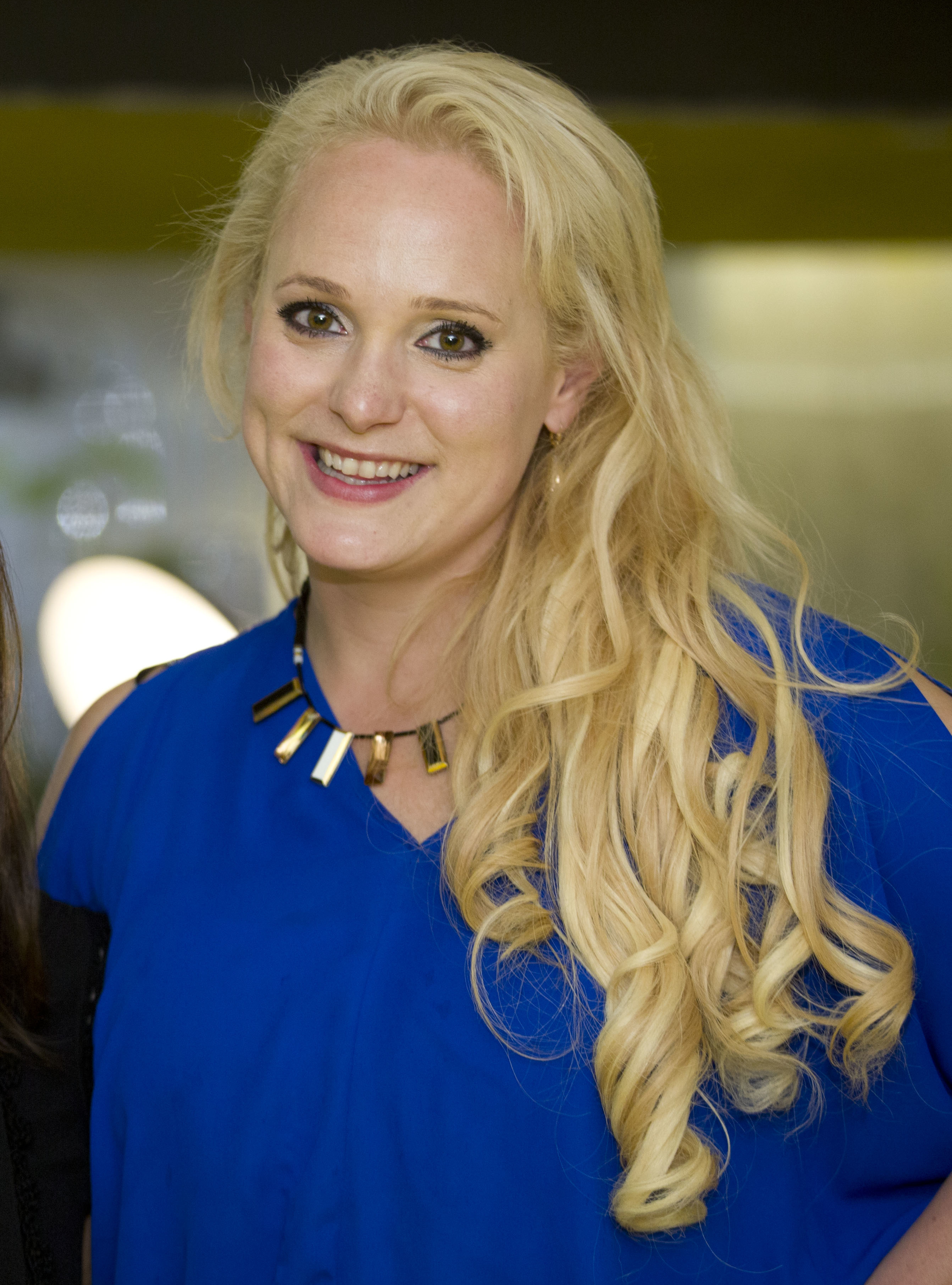
Jennifer Arcuri in 2015

Johnson had a close friendship with American technology entrepreneur, former DJ and model Jennifer Arcuri, with The Sunday Times describing him as a regular visitor to her flat, and implying they were in a sexual relationship. Innotech, her company, was awarded £10,000 from a mayoral fund in 2013, followed the next year by Arcuri being awarded £15,000 from a government programme. Johnson intervened to allow her onto three trade mission trips. The Sunday Times said in September 2019 that Johnson failed to declare his personal relationship as a conflict of interest. Later that month, the Greater London Authority referred Johnson and his actions in the matter to the Independent Office for Police Conduct (IOPC) "so it can assess whether or not it is necessary to investigate the former mayor of London for the criminal offence of misconduct in public office". The IOPC was involved because the Mayor is also London's police and crime commissioner. The London Assembly commenced its own investigation, but paused it at the IOPC's request to avoid overlap. On 9 November 2019 it was revealed that the IOPC, which had been due to publish a report on its investigation, had decided to do so after the general election of 12 December. The IOPC issued its report in May 2020, concluding that, although there was no basis for any criminal charge, there was evidence that decisions by officials had been influenced by the close relationship between Johnson and Arcuri. The report also found that Johnson should have declared an interest concerning Arcuri and that his failure to do this could have breached the London Assembly's code of conduct. On behalf of the London Assembly, the chair of its Greater London Authority Oversight Committee said that the committee would now resume its own investigation.

=== Transportation ===
Johnson supported the proposed Garden Bridge, a proposed privately-built pedestrian bridge over the River Thames. £43 million of public money was spent on the, ultimately failed, effort to construct the bridge, with £24 million coming from Transport for London and £19 million coming from the Department for Transport.

While a 2008 campaign promise of his had been to cease the closure of ticket offices on the London Underground, and to guarantee that all stations had a staffed ticket office, on 21 November 2013, Transport for London announced that all London Underground ticket offices would close by 2015.

Night Tube service was planned to start in September 2015, but its launch was delayed. The service ultimately launched in August 2016, several months after Johnson left office.

In 2015 Johnson introduced plans for an Ultra Low Emission Zone in London, due to come into operation in 2020.

=== Other activities ===
In February 2012, Johnson criticised London's Saint Patrick's Day gala dinner celebrations, linking them to Sinn Féin and branding the event "Lefty crap", for which he later apologised.

In February 2013, during a London Assembly meeting following the publication of the 2014 budget for London, Johnson was ejected from the meeting following a vote and on the grounds that his deputy Victoria Borwick had left the chamber. Upon realising that the vote meant that he would not be questioned on the budget, Johnson referred to his political opponents as "great supine protoplasmic invertebrate jellies".

Johnson attended the launch of the World Islamic Economic Forum in London in July 2013, where he answered questions alongside Malaysian Prime Minister Najib Razak. He joked that Malaysian women attended university in order to find husbands, causing some offence among female attendees.

In 2014, Johnson pushed his biography of Winston Churchill, The Churchill Factor, with media emphasising how Johnson repeatedly compared himself to Churchill throughout. During campaigning in 2016, he said there was an attempt to create the Roman Empire's united Europe. He said, "Napoleon, Hitler, various people tried this out, and it ends tragically. The EU is an attempt to do this by different methods." Also in 2014, he was criticised for saying that "almost half" of his senior staff were female, when London Assembly members stated that only four of fourteen top positions in Johnson's administration were occupied by women.

In 2015, Johnson criticised then-presidential candidate Donald Trump's false comments that there were no-go zones in London governed by shariah and inaccessible for non-Muslims. Johnson said that Trump was "betraying a quite stupefying ignorance that makes him, frankly, unfit to hold the office of president of the United States", becoming the first senior politician in the UK to declare Trump unfit for office (but rejecting calls for him to be banned from the country). Johnson also added that he "would invite [Trump] to come and see the whole of London and take him round the city – except I wouldn't want to expose Londoners to any unnecessary risk of meeting Donald Trump." He later called Trump's comments "ill informed" and "complete and utter nonsense", adding that "the only reason I wouldn't go to some parts of New York is the real risk of meeting Donald Trump". In 2016, he said he was "genuinely worried that he could become president", telling ITV's Tom Bradby of one moment where he was mistaken for Trump in New York as "one of the worst moments" of his life.

Johnson initially said that he would not return to the House of Commons while remaining mayor. After much media speculation, in August 2014 he sought selection as the Conservative candidate for the safe seat of Uxbridge and South Ruislip at the 2015 general election, becoming the party's candidate in September. In the May 2015 general election, Johnson was elected. Therefore, for the last several months of his mayoralty, he was both mayor and a member of parliament.

== Post-mayoralty ==
=== End of mayoralty ===
Johnson did not run for a third term for Mayor of London, and stepped down on 9 May 2016, after Labour Party Shadow Cabinet member, and former transport minister, Sadiq Khan, won the mayoral election to succeed him. Johnson left office still popular with the people of London. A YouGov poll commissioned at the end of his term revealed that 52% of Londoners believed he did a "good job" as Mayor of London while only 29% believed he did a "bad job". In 2016, Sadiq Khan announced that three German-made water cannon, which Johnson had bought for the Metropolitan Police without waiting for clearance from the then-Home Secretary Theresa May, were to be sold off with the funds going to youth services. The vehicles proved to be unsellable and were eventually sold for scrap in 2018 at a £300,000 loss.

=== Post-mayoralty career in politics ===
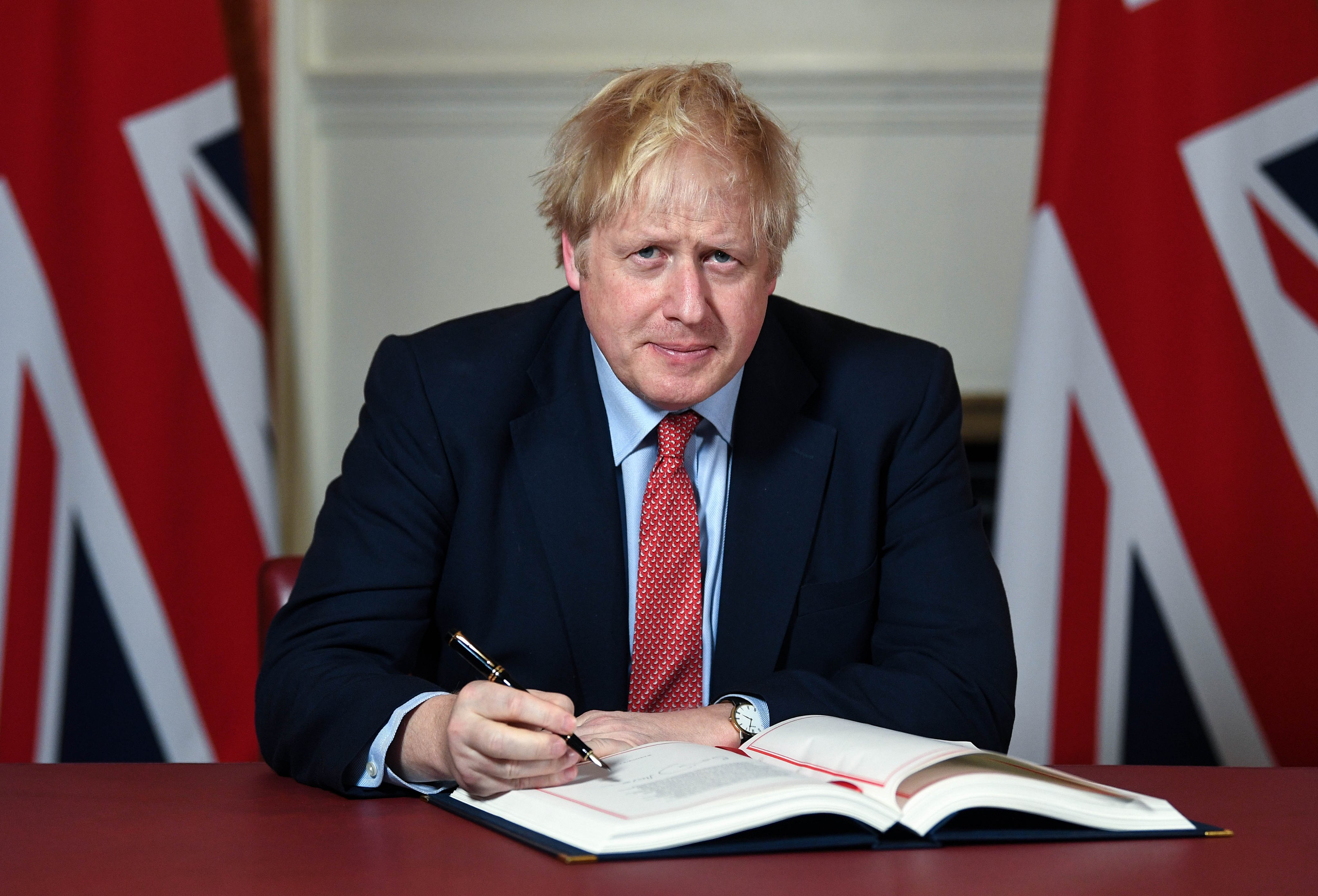
Johnson after being elected Prime Minister, signing the Withdrawal Agreement for the UK to leave the EU on January 31, 2020

Following his mayoralty, Johnson became a prominent figure in the successful Vote Leave campaign for Brexit in the 2016 European Union (EU) membership referendum. Theresa May appointed him foreign secretary after the referendum; he resigned the position two years later in protest to the Chequers Agreement and May’s approach to Brexit.

In 2019, Johnson was elected Conservative leader, and succeeded May as prime minister. Parliament ratified Johnson's Brexit withdrawal agreement, and the UK left the European Union on 31 January 2020, beginning an eleven-month transition period. In March 2020, Johnson responded to the COVID-19 pandemic by enacting emergency powers and widespread societal measures including several lockdowns, and approved a vaccination programme.

Johnson's premiership was characterised by a string of political controversies and scandals, including the revelation that Johnson and his government held several non-socially distanced gatherings at 10 Downing Street during 2020 and 2021. Following the July 2022 United Kingdom government crisis, Johnson announced his forthcoming resignation on 7 July 2022, and remained as prime minister in a caretaker role until 6 September 2022. He was succeeded by Liz Truss, his foreign secretary. He remained in the House of Commons as a backbencher until 9 June 2023, when he received the draft of the Commons Privileges Committee investigation into his conduct that unanimously found that he had lied to the Commons on numerous occasions. Johnson resigned his position as MP the same day.

Preceded by Ken Livingstone	Mayor of London; 2008–2016	Succeeded by Sadiq Khan
