= Ray Lewis (disambiguation) =

Ray Lewis (born 1975) is an American former professional football player.

Ray Lewis may also refer to:

- Ray Lewis (referee) (born 1944), former English association football referee
- Ray Lewis (sprinter) (1910–2003), Canadian sprinter and the first Canadian-born black Olympic medalist
- Ray Lewis (youth worker) (1963–2024), British politician, deputy mayor of London
- Ray Lewis (singer), member of The Drifters
- Ray Lewis (songwriter), writer of "Love Gonna Pack Up (And Walk Out)"

== See also ==
- Raymond Lewis (1952–2001), American basketball and streetball player
