= Political positions of Boris Johnson =

Political positions of UK Prime Minister Boris Johnson

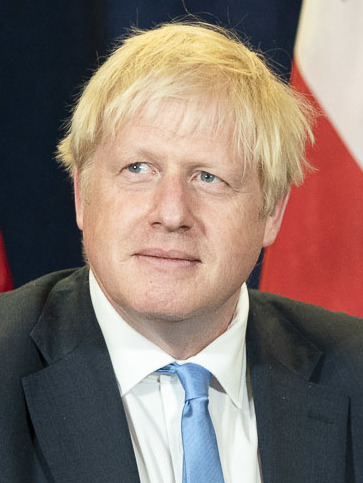
Boris Johnson in 2019

Boris Johnson has declared his position on many political issues through his public comments. Johnson's political positions have changed throughout his political career. His policies, views and voting record have been the subject of commentary during Johnson's tenure in various positions, including as Mayor of London from 2008 to 2016 and Prime Minister of the United Kingdom from 2019 to 2022.

Johnson is a supporter of unionism. He has sometimes been described as Eurosceptic, and advocated for a referendum on European Union membership for some time before the 2016 vote, during which he endorsed Vote Leave. Before and during his premiership, his views on Brexit included endorsing leaving the Single Market and leaving even without a deal. He opposed Theresa May's Chequers plan and Irish backstop, and as Prime Minister renegotiated the Brexit withdrawal agreement and replaced the latter with the Northern Ireland Protocol.

Johnson's views on the environment have changed; he wrote several climate skeptical columns in the 2010s but advocated for political action on climate change and renewable energy transition by the 2020s. In foreign policy, he was a transatlanticist, supported the Saudi Arabian–led intervention in Yemen and endorsed a more aggressive policy towards Russia, including by imposing sanctions on Russia, supporting Finland and Sweden's NATO membership bid, and supporting Ukraine during Russia's ongoing invasion, authorizing billions in foreign aid and weapons shipments to Ukraine. While Johnson initially wanted closer relations with China, he turned hawkish on the country by the end of his tenure, as he had established a citizenship pathway for emigres from Hong Kong and joined the AUKUS security pact.

Johnson has been described as an adherent of one-nation conservatism. Commentators have also likened Johnson's political ideology to liberalism and libertarianism, and in some cases Gaullism and Trumpism. Some of his views and political leanings have changed over time. On certain issues, he has been described as slightly more liberal than others in the Conservative Party. It has also been noted that the Conservative Party manifesto of 2019 was the most "leftwing" manifesto of any Tory leader since the 1960s, which would make Boris Johnson the most leftwing Conservative leader since Harold Macmillan.

== Political ideology ==
Ideologically, Johnson has been described by himself and others as a "One-Nation Tory". In 2012, the political scientist Tony Travers described Johnson as "a fairly classic—that is, small-state—mildly eurosceptic Conservative" who, like his contemporaries David Cameron and George Osborne, also embraced "modern social liberalism". The Guardian stated that while Mayor of London, Johnson blended economic and social liberalism, with The Economist saying that in doing so Johnson "transcends his Tory identity" and adopts a more libertarian perspective. Stuart Reid, Johnson's colleague at The Spectator, described the latter's views as being those of a "liberal libertarian". Business Insider commented that as London Mayor, Johnson gained a reputation as "a liberal, centre-ground politician".

Gimson wrote that Johnson is economically and socially "a genuine liberal", although he retains a "Tory element" to his personality through his "love of existing institutions, and a recognition of the inevitability of hierarchy". His liberal stance on matters such as social policy, immigration and free trade were also commented on in 2019. In 2019, Al Jazeera editor James Brownswell said that although Johnson had "leaned to the right" since the Brexit campaign, he remained "slightly more socially liberal" than much of his party. In 2019, former Deputy Leader of the Conservative Party Michael Heseltine said Johnson "has no right to call himself a one-nation Conservative" and wrote: "I fear that any traces of liberal conservatism that still exist within the prime minister have long since been captured by the rightwing, foreigner-bashing, inward-looking view of the world that has come to characterise his fellow Brexiters."

[I am] free-market, tolerant, broadly libertarian (though perhaps not ultra-libertarian), inclined to see the merit of traditions, anti-regulation, pro-immigrant, pro-standing on your own two feet, pro-alcohol, pro-hunting, pro-motorist and ready to defend to the death the right of Glenn Hoddle to believe in reincarnation.

— Boris Johnson, 2011

Stuart Wilks-Heeg, executive director of Democratic Audit, said that "Boris is politically nimble", while Purnell stated that Johnson regularly changed his opinion on political issues, commenting on what she perceived to be "an ideological emptiness beneath the staunch Tory exterior". She later referred to his "opportunistic—some might say pragmatic—approach to politics".

Writing for Prospect, Philip Collins suggested that Johnson and other Brexiteers in the Conservative Party were "British Gaullists" who were "drawing on a conception of the nation in which the dormant spirit of liberty is being reborn". He suggested this was a form of nationalism, albeit not of the "chauvinistic" variety. Some outlets have suggested Johnson exemplifies some qualities of Trumpism. In Politico, Michael Hirsch compared Johnson to Trump, suggesting that both were advocates of a "New Nationalism". Johnson responded he is "not a nationalist if by that you mean I'm a xenophobe or someone who deprecates other countries and cultures".

Purnell has argued Johnson "is nothing if not an elitist". In a 2000 article titled "Long Live Elitism", Johnson stated that "without elites and elitism, man would still be in his caves". Since the Brexit campaign, he has criticised the "cynicism of the elite" about Brexit, described an "elite conspiracy to thwart Brexit", and accused the elite of being "frankly indifferent to the suffering that their policies are causing". Some media sources and political scientists have therefore called him a populist. The historian Sir Richard J. Evans has described Johnson as "a firm believer in the great man theory of history".

== Brexit and the European Union ==
In 2001, in an interview when he stood for Henley, Johnson said that he was in favour of Britain remaining in the EU despite his Euroscepticism because of "influence". 2003, Johnson said of the EU, "I am not by any means an ultra-Eurosceptic. In some ways, I am a bit of a fan of the European Union. If we did not have one, we would invent something like it." From 2009, he advocated a referendum on Britain's EU membership.

In the 1997 Tory leadership election and the 2001 Tory leadership election, Johnson endorsed Ken Clarke for the leadership of the Conservative Party despite Clarke's Euroenthusiasm.

=== 2016 referendum ===
In February 2016, Johnson endorsed Vote Leave in the "Out" campaign for the 2016 United Kingdom European Union membership referendum. He called David Cameron's warnings about leaving "greatly over exaggerated". Following this announcement, which was interpreted by financial markets as making Brexit more probable, the pound sterling slumped by nearly 2% against the US dollar, reaching its lowest level since March 2009.

In April 2016, in an article for The Sun, in response to a comment by President Barack Obama that Britain should remain in the European Union, Johnson said an "ancestral dislike" of Britain owing to his "part-Kenyan" background may have shaped Obama's views. Conservative MP Sir Nicholas Soames branded the comments "idiotic" and "deeply offensive". Several Labour and Liberal Democrat politicians condemned them as racist and unacceptable. In light of the remark, a King's College London student society revoked a speaking invitation it had extended to him. Conversely, both the Conservative Iain Duncan Smith and UK Independence Party (UKIP) leader Nigel Farage defended his comments.

On 22 June 2016, Johnson declared 23 June could be "Britain's independence day" in a televised debate in front of a 6,000-member audience at Wembley Arena. David Cameron, British prime minister at the time, specifically addressed Johnson's claim, publicly stating, "the idea that our country isn't independent is nonsense. This whole debate demonstrates our sovereignty."

=== Under Theresa May ===
In a September 2017 op-ed, Johnson reiterated the UK would regain control of £350 million a week after Brexit, suggesting it go to the National Health Service (NHS). Cabinet colleagues subsequently criticised him for reviving the assertion and accused of "clear misuse of official statistics" by the chair of the UK Statistics Authority, Sir David Norgrove. The authority rejected the suggestion that it was quibbling over newspaper headlines and not Johnson's actual words.

In 2018, he called for Britain to leave the Single Market and advocated a more liberal approach to immigration than that of Prime Minister Theresa May. He stated many people believed that Britain's EU membership had led to the suppression of the wages of its "indigenous" people and said the EU was intent on creating a "superstate" that would seek to rob Britain of its sovereignty.

In a February 2018 letter to May, Johnson suggested that Northern Ireland may have to accept border controls after Brexit and that it would not seriously affect trade, having initially said a hard border would be unthinkable.

Secret recordings obtained by BuzzFeed News in June 2018 revealed Johnson's dissatisfaction with May's negotiating style, accusing her of being too collaborative with the European Union in Brexit negotiations. Comparing May's approach to that of the US President Donald Trump—who at the time was engaged in a combative trade war with the EU because it raised tariffs on metal—Johnson said: "Imagine Trump doing Brexit. He'd go in bloody hard ... There'd be all sorts of breakdowns, all sorts of chaos. Everyone would think he'd gone mad. But actually you might get somewhere. It's a very, very good thought." He also called Philip Hammond and the Treasury "the heart of Remain" and accused individuals of scaremongering over a Brexit "meltdown", saying "No panic. Pro bono publico, no bloody panic. It's going to be all right in the end."

In July 2018, three days after the cabinet had its meeting at Chequers to agree on a Brexit strategy, Johnson, along with Brexit Secretary David Davis, resigned his post.

=== As Prime Minister ===
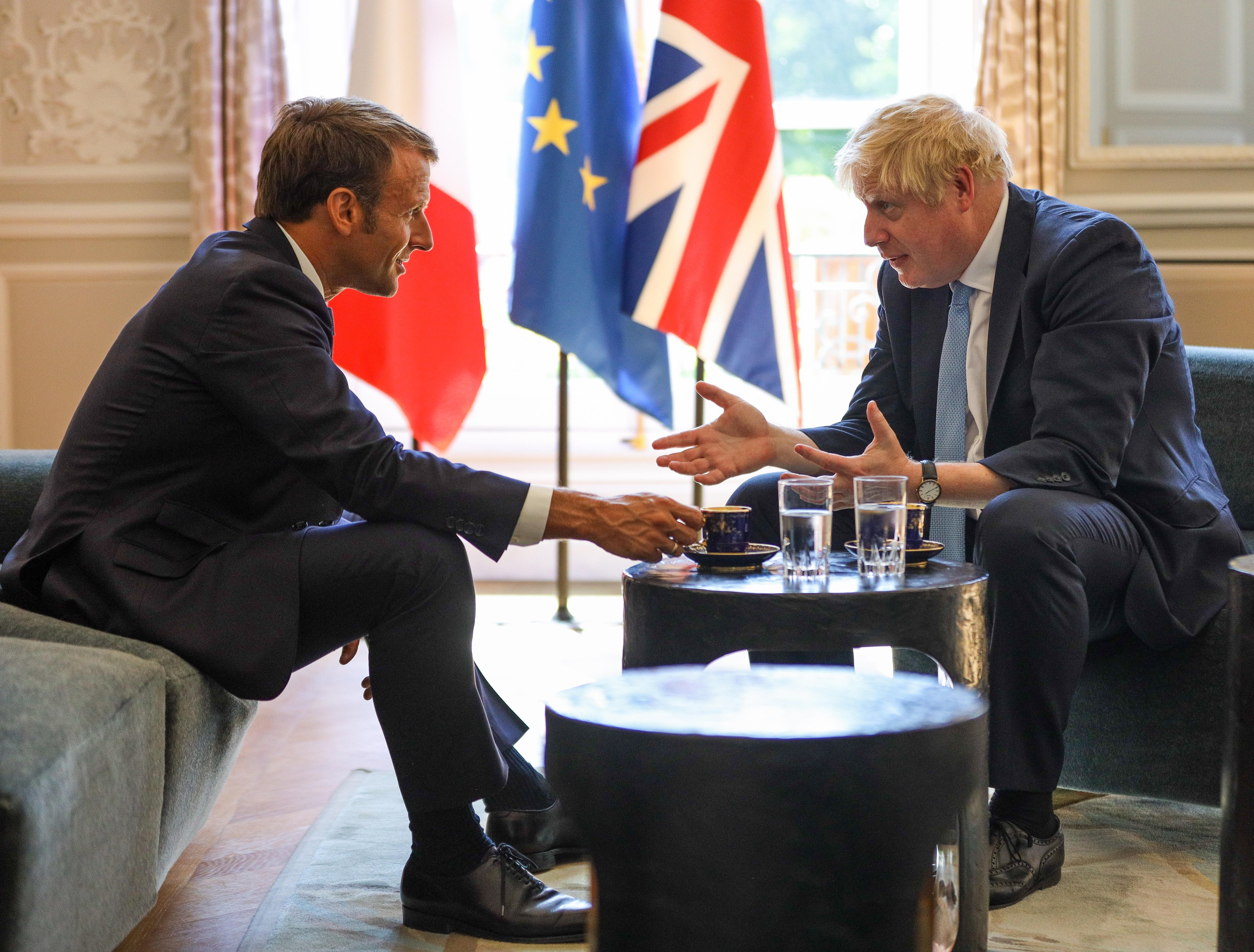
Johnson discussing Brexit with French President Emmanuel Macron in Paris

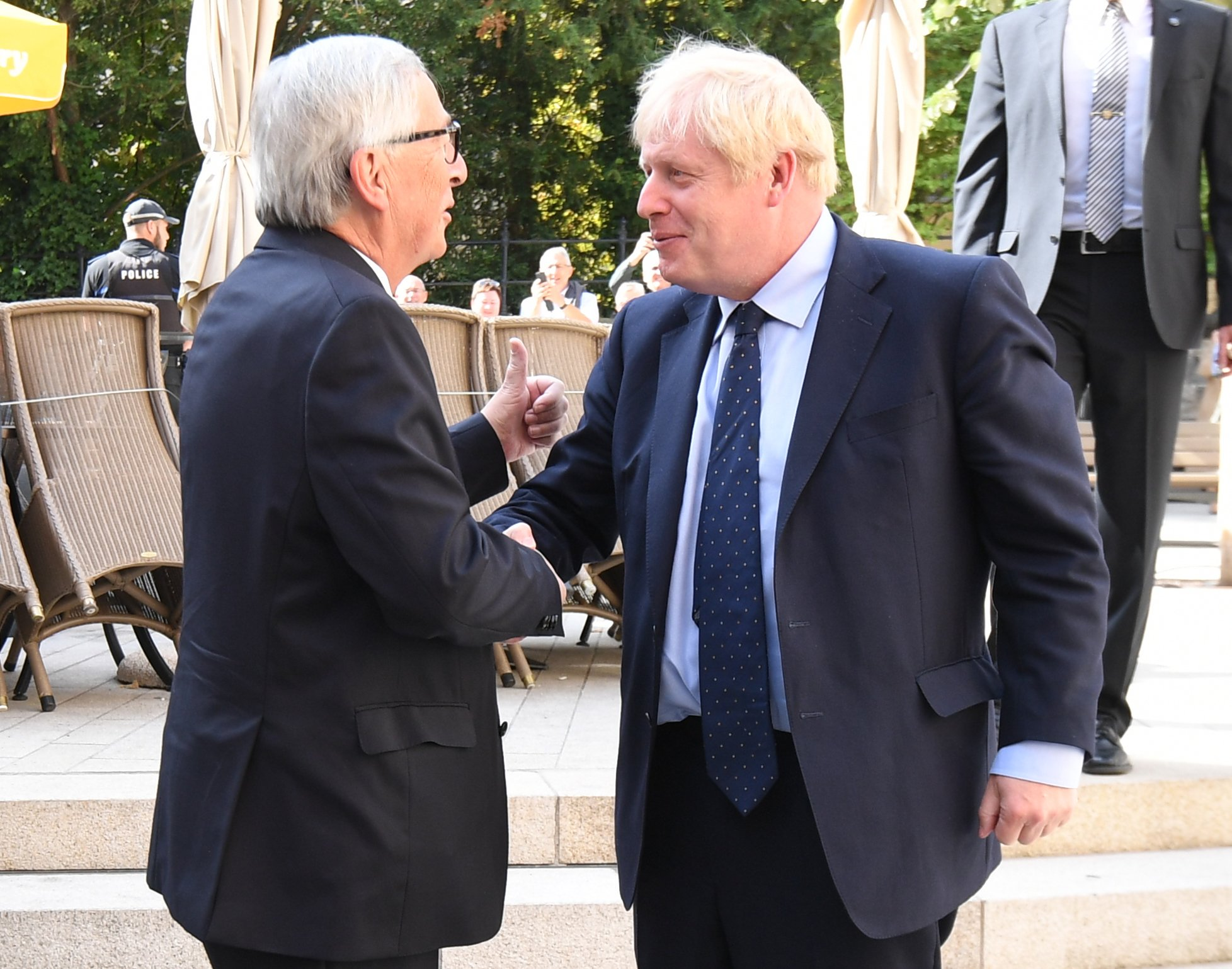
Johnson with EU Commission President Jean-Claude Juncker, 16 September 2019

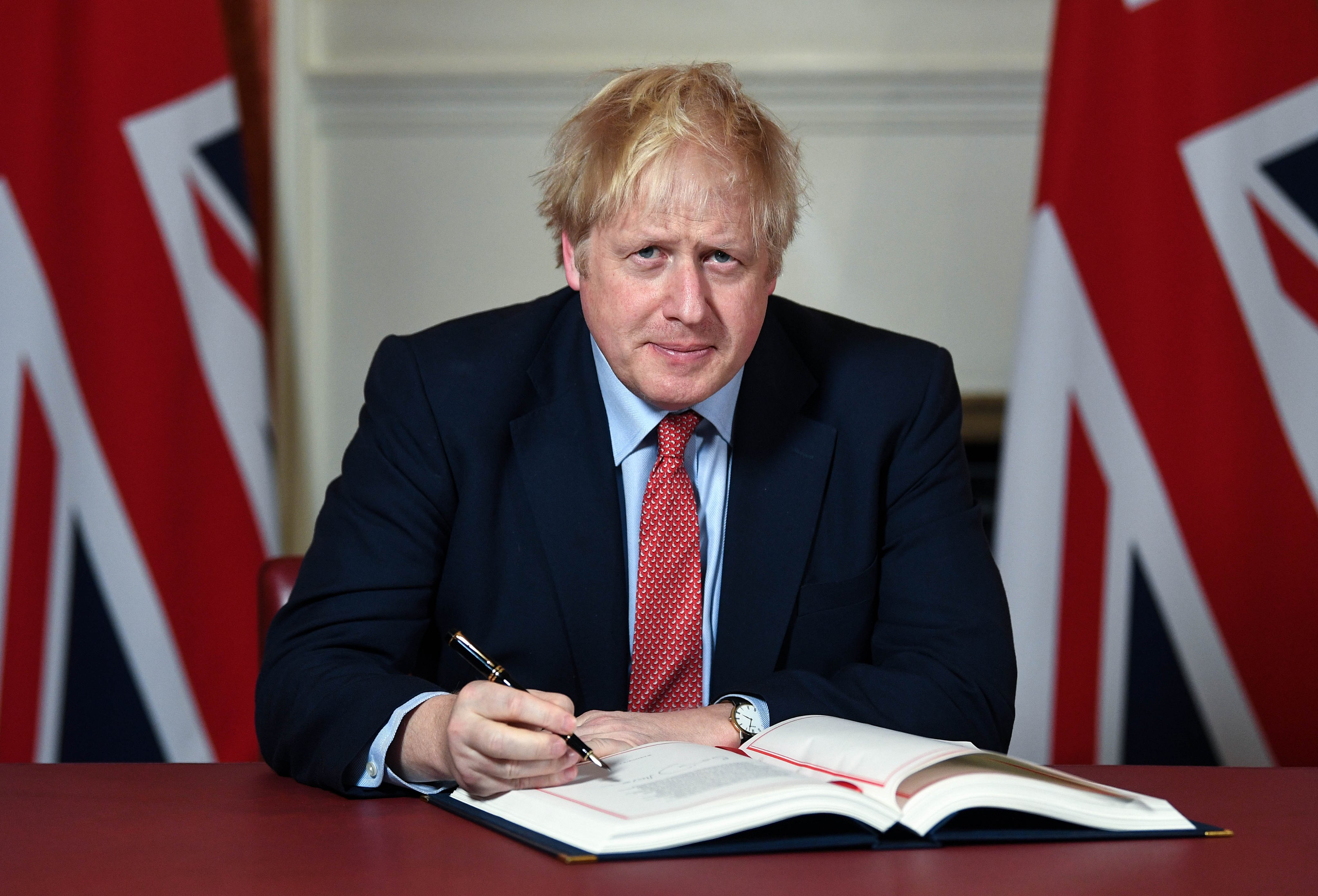
Johnson signing the Brexit Withdrawal Agreement

In his first speech as Prime Minister, Johnson said that the United Kingdom would leave the European Union on 31 October 2019 with or without a deal, and promised to remove the Irish backstop from the Brexit withdrawal agreement. Johnson declared his intention to re-open negotiations on the withdrawal agreement, but talks did not immediately resume as the EU refused to accept Johnson's pre-condition that the backstop be removed. The government subsequently announced £2.1bn of funding to prepare for a no-deal Brexit on 31 October. On 28 August 2019, UK and EU negotiators agreed to resume regular meetings to discuss the withdrawal agreement.

In 2019, Johnson said he would take Britain out of the EU on 31 October whether there was a trade deal in place or not. Johnson also stated his opposition to a referendum on the Brexit withdrawal agreement.

On 19 August 2019, Johnson wrote a letter to the EU and asked for the removal of the "backstop" accord, which had previously been agreed and signed by Theresa May during her premiership. The president of the European Council, Donald Tusk, rejected the proposal. On 26 August 2019, Johnson said that Britain would not pay £39 billion for the withdrawal agreement were the UK to leave without a deal on 31 October. The European Parliament Brexit coordinator Guy Verhofstadt said there would be no further negotiation on the trade deal unless the UK agreed to pay the entire sum.

Also on 28 August 2019, Johnson declared he had asked the Queen to prorogue parliament from 10 September, narrowing the window in which parliament could block a no-deal Brexit and causing a political controversy. The Queen at Privy Council approved prorogation later the same day, and it began on 10 September, scheduled to last until 14 October. Some suggested that this prorogation amounted to a self-coup, and on 31 August 2019, protests occurred in towns and cities throughout the United Kingdom. As of 2 September 2019, three separate court cases challenging Johnson's action were in progress or scheduled to take place, and on 11 September, three Scottish judges ruled the prorogation of the UK Parliament to be unlawful. On 12 September, Johnson denied lying to the Queen over suspension of the parliament, while a Belfast Court rejected claims that his Brexit plans would have a negative impact on Northern Ireland's peace policy. On 24 September, the Supreme Court ruled unanimously that Johnson's advice to prorogue parliament was unlawful, and therefore the prorogation was rendered null and of no effect.

In October 2019, following bilateral talks between Johnson and Taoiseach Leo Varadkar, the UK and EU agreed to a revised deal, which replaced the backstop with a new Northern Ireland protocol.

In December 2019, Johnson said: "quite a large number of people coming in from the whole of the EU—580 million population—[had been] able to treat the UK as though it's basically part of their own country and the problem with that is there has been no control at all". The co-founder of The 3 Million accused Johnson of "demonising" EU migrants.

== Environment ==
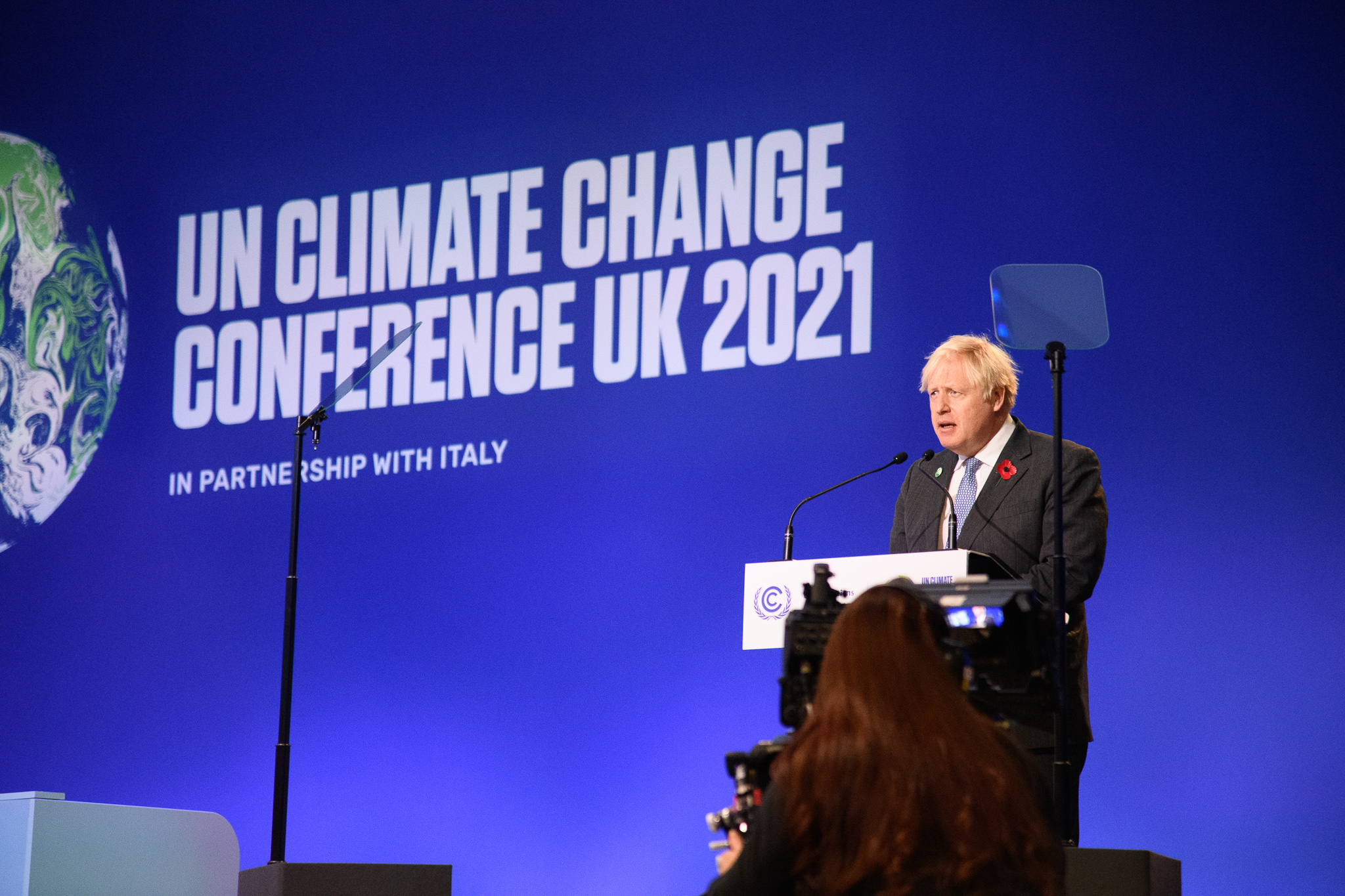
Johnson spoke about climate action at the COP26 climate summit in Glasgow on 1 November 2021.

According to TheyWorkForYou, Johnson has "generally voted against" what it described as "measures to prevent climate change" while an MP. Former Minister of State for Energy and Clean Growth Claire O'Neill has said that Johnson has "admitted to [her] that he doesn't really understand" climate change. While Mayor of London, Johnson expressed climate skeptical views in several columns. In two Daily Telegraph columns published in 2012 and 2013, he conflated the distinction between weather and climate and highlighted a factually incorrect claim by weather forecaster and conspiracy theorist Piers Corbyn that reduced solar activity could lead to a "mini-Ice Age". Bloomberg suggested that Johnson's interest in climate change increased after becoming prime minister, and suggested this could have been influenced by his wife Carrie Symonds and father Stanley Johnson, who are both environmental campaigners. It was reported in 2022 that Johnson was convinced of the scientific consensus on climate change following a briefing by the chief scientist of the Met Office in January 2020, and subsequently made the issue a priority for his government.

In 2019, Johnson expressed support for a legal commitment for the UK to achieve "net-zero" greenhouse gas emissions by 2050. In 2020, he called on world leaders to act on climate change, said he was a "complete evangelist" for carbon capture and storage and said "as Saudi Arabia is to oil, the UK is to wind".

In November 2020, Johnson announced a 10-point plan for a "green industrial revolution", which would include the end the sale of petrol and diesel cars and vans by 2030, (Note: This was a reduction on the 2035 target set in February that year, which brought forward the previous deadline of 2040.) quadruple the amount of offshore wind power capacity within a decade, fund a variety of emissions-cutting proposals, and spurn a proposed green post-COVID recovery. In 2021, the UK government under Johnson's leadership announced plans to cut carbon emissions by 78% by 2035.

In a speech at the United Nations General Assembly in September 2021, Johnson called for increased climate finance and celebrated the creation of the first green bond in the UK that collected £10bn in one day. He called on world leaders to increase ambition to mitigate climate change at the 2021 United Nations Climate Change Conference (COP26) summit, which the UK hosted, and said that he welcomed the prospect of coal phase-out. Johnson announced that the UK would join the Global Methane Pledge to cut methane emissions by 30% by the year of 2030 at COP26.

In April 2022, Johnson announced that eight more nuclear reactors would be built on existing nuclear power plant sites, and called for an expansion in wind energy. Under these plans, up to 95% of the UK's electricity could come from low-carbon power sources by 2030.

== Unionism and devolution ==
Johnson focused on strengthening the Union within his first few days as prime minister, creating a Minister for the Union position and visiting Scotland, Wales and Northern Ireland. Showing a commitment to the North of England, he gave Northern Powerhouse minister Jake Berry a right to attend cabinet. On 27 July, Johnson gave a speech at the Science and Industry Museum in Manchester where he promised to build a high-speed rail route connecting the city to Leeds.

Johnson welcomed a decision by political parties in Northern Ireland to restore the Northern Ireland Assembly on the basis of negotiations between the British and Irish governments. Talks succeeded under Northern Ireland Secretary Julian Smith to create a 6th Northern Ireland Assembly, which resumed meeting on 11 January 2020. It followed a three-year hiatus with a new power sharing agreement between Sinn Féin and the Democratic Unionist Party (DUP). Speaking in Northern Ireland, Johnson described himself as a "fervent and passionate unionist".

He proposed building a bridge or tunnel between Scotland and Northern Ireland, but has since scrapped this initiative.

The devolved administrations have criticised the Internal Market Bill for its re-centralisation of control over commerce, reversing the devolution of power in the United Kingdom. In 2020, Johnson reportedly said that "devolution has been a disaster" in Scotland, and said Scottish devolution was Tony Blair's "biggest mistake". He later clarified he was merely criticising the "performance of devolution" in Scotland under the Scottish National Party (SNP) and did not "oppose devolution as a concept in itself".

== Economic policy ==
=== Financial services ===
Johnson championed London's financial sector and denounced what he saw as "banker bashing" following the 2008 financial crisis, condemning the anti-capitalist Occupy London movement that appeared in 2011. He spent much time with those involved in the financial services and criticised the government's 50p tax rate for higher earners.

=== Mayor's Fund ===
As Mayor of London, Johnson collected donations from the city's wealthy for a charitable enterprise, the Mayor's Fund, which he had established to aid disadvantaged youths. It initially announced the fund would raise £100 million, but by 2010 it had only spent £1.5 million.

=== Public spending ===
Shortly after he became prime minister, Johnson's government announced increased public sector spending. In particular, it was announced that an extra 20,000 police officers would be hired, the roll-out of high-speed broadband would be sped up, the funding per school pupil would be increased to a minimum of £5,000 and £1.8 billion for upgrades and new equipment at hospitals. £1 billion of the money for hospitals was money that NHS providers had saved over the past three years and then previously been told they could not spend, rather than being new money. The chancellor Sajid Javid also announced that the spending review would be fast-tracked to September. Javid said that this was so that departments would be free to plan for the planned Brexit date of 31 October 2019, but there was speculation that the increased spending was to gain popularity in preparation for a possible election in autumn 2019. Boris also criticised the austerity measures during the Coalition Government. During his time as Mayor of London, he said that he would not accept "Kosovo-style" social cleansing in London.

=== Levelling up policy ===
The 2021 Queen's Speech announced that the government will "level up opportunities across all parts of the United Kingdom, supporting jobs, businesses and economic growth and addressing the impact of the pandemic on public services", implementing an election manifesto pledge.

=== Social care ===
On 7 September 2021 Johnson announced plans for social care reforms, including a 1.25% rise in National Insurance to raise £36 billion over three years, and a cap of £86,000 on lifetime care costs in England. The following day MPs voted in favour of an NHS and social care tax rise by 319 votes to 248, a majority of 71.

== Crime ==
Johnson appointed himself chair of the Metropolitan Police Authority (MPA), and in October 2008 successfully pushed for the resignation of Metropolitan Police Commissioner Ian Blair after the latter was criticised for allegedly handing contracts to friends and for his handling of the death of Jean Charles de Menezes. This earned Johnson great respect among Conservatives, who interpreted it as his first act of strength. Johnson resigned as MPA chairman in January 2010, but throughout his mayoralty was highly supportive of the Metropolitan Police, particularly during the controversy surrounding the death of Ian Tomlinson.

Overall crime in London fell during his Mayoral administration, but his claim that serious youth crime had decreased proved to be false, and he acknowledged the error. Similarly, his claim that Metropolitan Police numbers had increased was characterised as untrue, but the fact-checkers at Full Fact felt that both Johnson's and his critics' positions are defensible. He was criticised for his response to the 2011 London riots; holidaying with his family in British Columbia when the rioting broke out, he did not return immediately to London, only doing so 48 hours after it had begun and addressing Londoners 60 hours thereafter. Upon visiting shopkeepers and residents affected by the riots in Clapham, elements within the crowds booed and jeered him.

=== Capital punishment ===
Johnson has said he doesn't support the death penalty.

== Constitutional affairs ==
At the State Opening of Parliament on 11 May 2021, a range of proposed laws were announced that are expected to be enacted during Johnson's second term, including the Dissolution and Calling of Parliament Bill, which would restore the royal prerogative to dissolve Parliament. A further law would introduce mandatory voter identification at general elections.

=== London Mayoral system ===
Johnson made no major changes to the London Mayoral system Ken Livingstone developed. He reversed several measures implemented by Livingstone's administration, abolishing The Londoner newsletter.

The formation of the Forensic Audit Panel was announced on 8 May 2008. The panel was tasked with monitoring and investigating financial management at the London Development Agency and the Greater London Authority. Johnson's announcement was criticised by Labour for the perceived politicisation of this nominally independent panel, who asked whether the appointment of key Johnson allies to the panel – "to dig dirt on Ken Livingstone" – was "an appropriate use of public funds". The head of the panel, Patience Wheatcroft, was married to a Conservative councillor and three of the four remaining panel members also had close links to the Conservatives: Stephen Greenhalgh (Conservative Leader of Hammersmith and Fulham London Borough Council), Patrick Frederick (Chairman of Conservative Business Relations for South East England and Southern London), and Edward Lister (Conservative Leader of Wandsworth London Borough Council).

== Transport ==
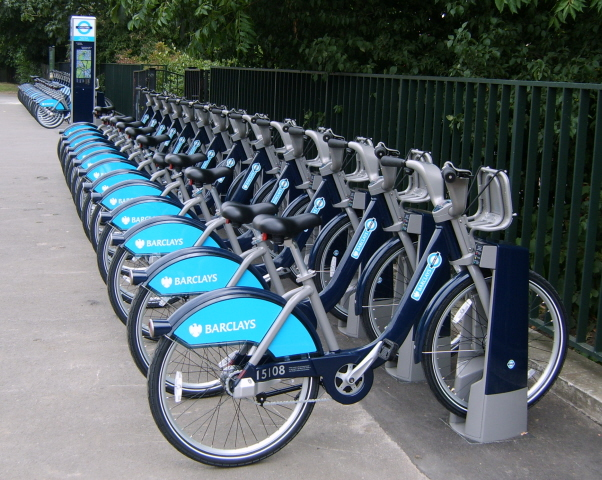
Johnson implemented Livingstone's idea of a public bicycle system; the result was dubbed the "Boris Bike".

As Mayor of London, Johnson retained Livingstone projects such as Crossrail, but was accused of trying to take credit for them. Measures implemented by Livingstone's administration that Johnson rejected included the half-yearly inspections of black cabs, which was reinstated three years later. He introduced a public bicycle scheme that had been mooted by Livingstone's administration; colloquially known as "Boris Bikes", the part privately financed system cost £140 million and was a significant financial loss but proved popular. Despite Johnson's support of cycling in London, and his much-publicised identity as a cyclist, some cycling groups who argued he had failed to make the city's roads safer for cyclists criticised his administration. As per his election pledge, he commissioned the development of the New Routemaster buses for central London. He also ordered the construction of a cable car system that crossed the River Thames between Greenwich Peninsula and the Royal Docks.

Johnson's first policy initiative as Mayor of London was a ban on drinking alcohol on public transport. At the beginning of his tenure as Mayor, Johnson announced plans to extend pay-as-you-go Oyster cards to national rail services in London. A pledge in Johnson's election manifesto was to retain Tube ticket offices, in opposition to Livingstone's proposal to close up to 40 London Underground ticket offices. On 2 July 2008, the Mayor's office announced the closure plan was to be abandoned and that offices would remain open. On 21 November 2013, Transport for London announced that all London Underground ticket offices would close by 2015. In financing these projects, Johnson's administration borrowed £100 million, while public transport fares were increased by 50 per cent.

Abolishing the western wing of the congestion charging zone, he cancelled plans to increase the London congestion charge for four-wheel-drive vehicles. He was subsequently accused of failing to publish an independent report on air pollution commissioned by the Greater London Authority, which revealed the city breached legal limits on nitrogen dioxide levels.

== Social affairs ==
=== 2012 Summer Olympics ===
As Mayor of London, Livingstone projects Johnson retained included the 2012 Olympic Games.

=== Media ===
As Mayor of London Johnson maintained extensive personal contacts throughout the British media, which resulted in widespread favourable press coverage of his administration. In turn he remained largely supportive of his friends in the media—among them Rupert Murdoch—during the News International phone hacking scandal.

=== Welfare ===
During his first London Mayoral term, Johnson was perceived as having moved leftward on certain issues, for instance, supporting the London Living Wage.

=== LGBT affairs ===
During his first London Mayoral term, Johnson tried placating critics who had deemed him a bigot by appearing at London's gay pride parade. In 2012, he banned London buses from displaying the adverts of Core Issues Trust, a Christian group, which compared homosexuality to an illness.

In late March/early April 2022, Johnson decided to ban conversion therapy for sexual orientation but not for transgender Britons, despite previous commitment to end such treatment for all LGBT people. He defended his decision citing "complexities and sensitivities", adding that "biological males" should not compete in women's sport and women should have their own changing rooms. In the government's 2017 LGBT survey, 5 per cent of the respondents said they had been offered therapy, with 2 per cent saying they had undergone it. Conversion therapy is fully or partially banned in Canada, Germany, Malta, Mexico, and dozens of US states. As a result of the transgender exclusion, over 100 organisations pulled out of a planned equality conference, which had to be abandoned.

=== Immigration and racial discrimination ===
Purnell believed it was the influence of Johnson's maternal family, the left-wing Fawcetts, that led to him developing "a genuine abhorrence of racial discrimination". During his first London Mayoral term, Johnson was perceived as having moved leftward on certain issues, for instance, endorsing an amnesty for illegal migrants. Johnson declared his support for an amnesty during the Vote Leave and during his time as Foreign Secretary. As prime minister, Johnson declared that he was 'open' to the idea of illegal immigrant amnesty.

As Mayor of London, Johnson was known as a supporter of immigration.

Laws proposed in the 2021 State Opening of Parliament included reform of the national immigration system. The consequence of his immigration reforms led to a liberalisation of immigration and more immigration from non-EU countries.

=== Language ===
During the 2019 Conservative leadership election Johnson said that there are too many parts of the UK where English is not spoken as a first language and that he wanted immigrants to Britain to learn English.

=== Deplatforming ===
Laws proposed in the 2021 State Opening of Parliament included a Higher Education (Freedom of Speech) Bill to combat deplatforming at universities.

=== Online Safety Bill ===
Laws proposed in the 2021 State Opening of Parliament included an Online Safety Bill that would impose a statutory duty of care on online companies and empower Ofcom to block particular websites.

=== Animal sentience ===
Laws proposed in the 2021 State Opening of Parliament included an Animal Welfare (Sentience) Bill that would legally recognise animal sentience.

=== Burka ban ===
Johnson does not support banning the burka.

== Foreign policy ==
Some journalists and foreign politicians criticised Johnson's appointment as Foreign Secretary because of his history of controversial statements about other countries. His tenure in the role attracted criticism from diplomats and foreign policy experts. A number of diplomats, FCO staff and foreign ministers who worked with Johnson compared his leadership unfavourably to previous foreign secretaries for his perceived lack of conviction or substantive positions on British foreign policy issues. Former Swedish prime minister Carl Bildt said: "I wish it was a joke." A senior official in Obama's government suggested Johnson's appointment would push the US further towards Germany at the expense of the Special Relationship with the UK. On one occasion Egyptian president Abdel Fattah el-Sisi walked out of a meeting with Johnson after a meeting did not "get beyond the pleasantries".

Johnson supported the European Union–Mercosur Free Trade Agreement, which would form one of the world's largest free trade areas.

=== Venezuela ===
Measures implemented by Livingstone's London Mayoral administration that Johnson rejected included ending the city's oil deal with Venezuela.

=== United States ===
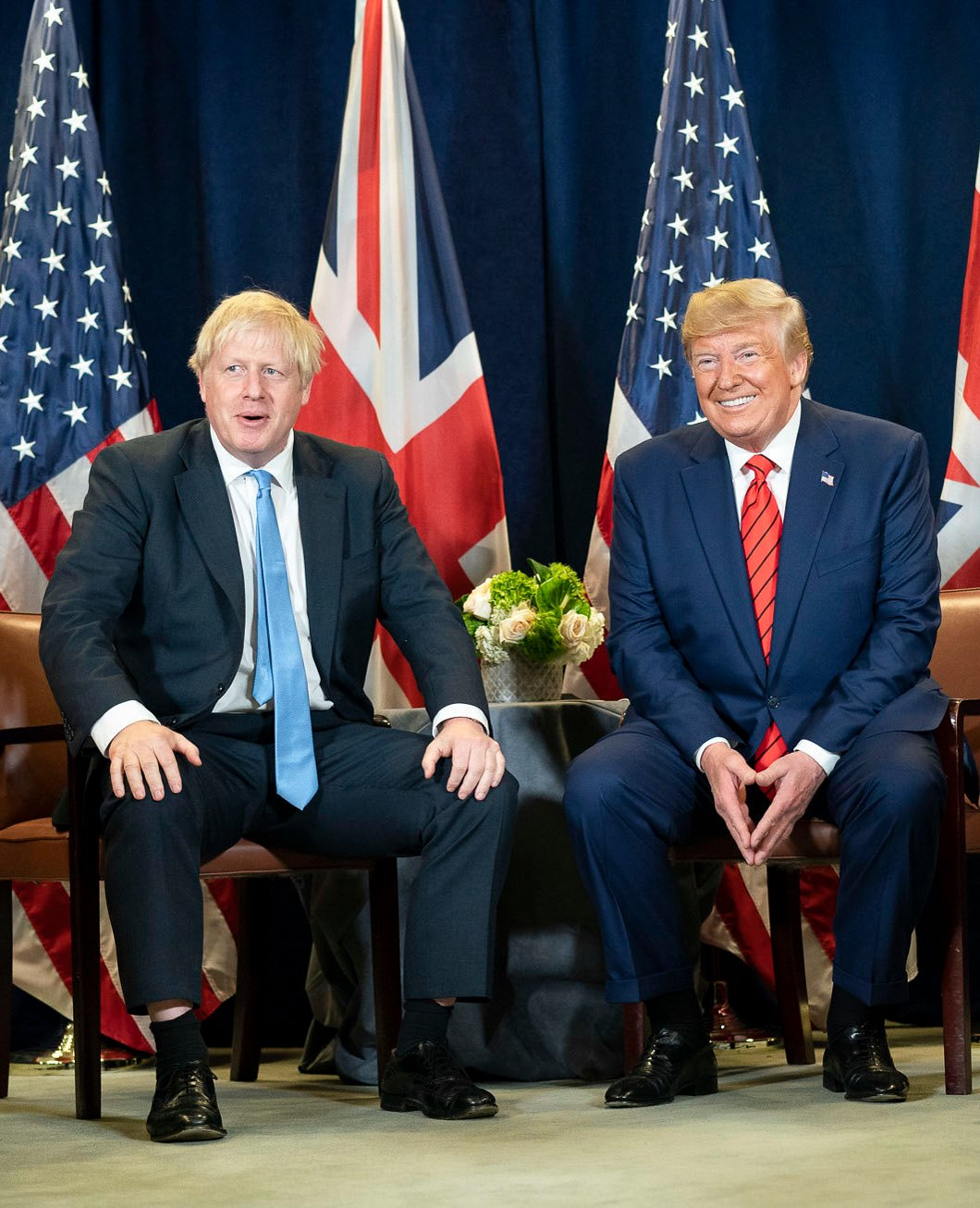
Boris Johnson and US President Donald Trump in September 2019

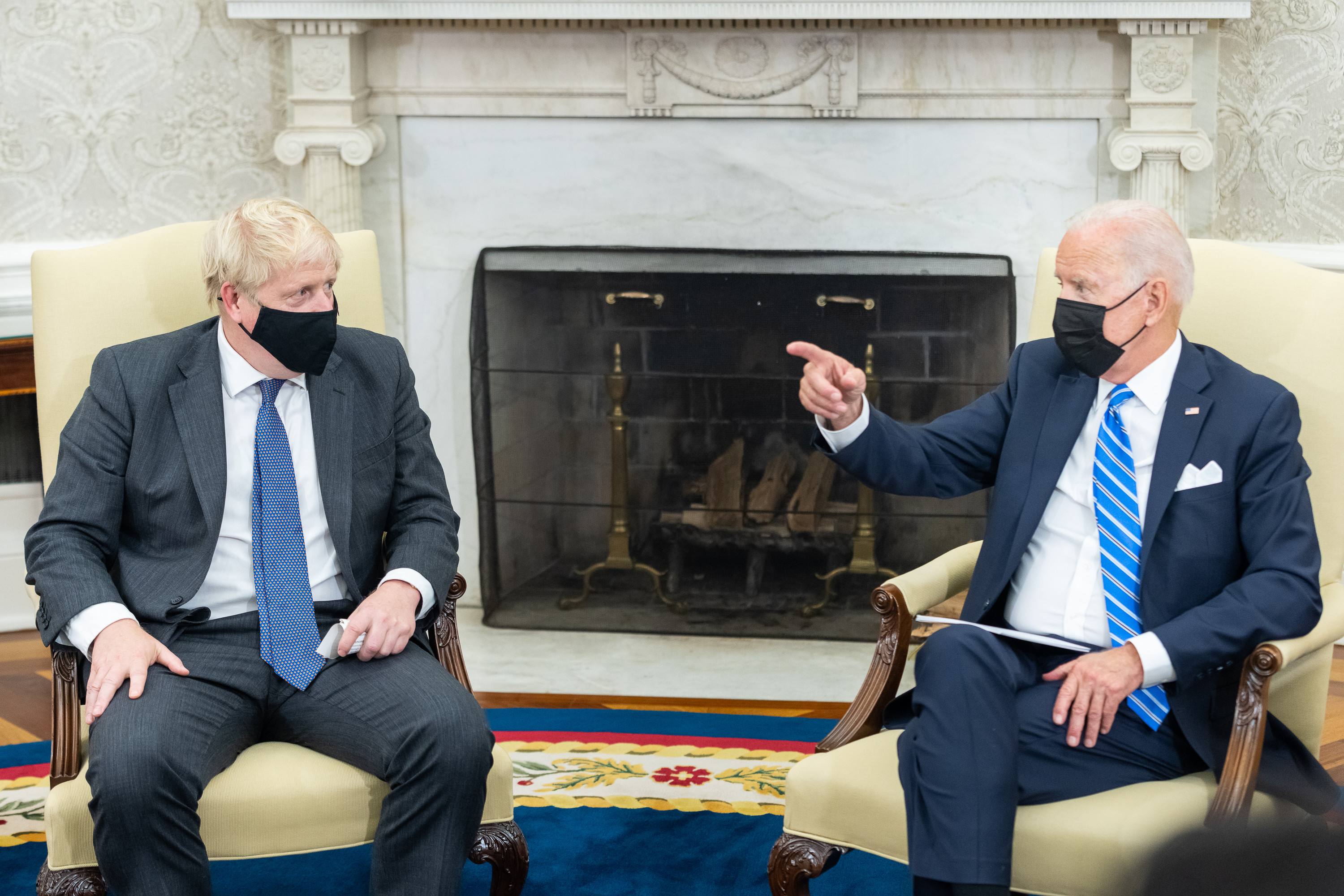
Boris Johnson and US President Joe Biden in September 2021

In August 2008, when Mayor of London, Johnson broke from the traditional protocol of those in public office not publicly commenting on other nations' elections by endorsing Barack Obama for the presidency of the United States.

Johnson's government placed importance on maintaining the "Special Relationship" with the United States.

In 2024, Johnson endorsed Donald Trump's presidential bid for the White House race but asked Trump to continue the US support of Ukraine. Johnson has described the conviction of Donald Trump as a "corrupt mob-style hit job". He claims that Trump will be more likely to win following the conviction.

=== Turkey ===
Johnson supported Vote Leave's statement that the government was committed to Turkish accession to the EU at the earliest possible opportunity, contradicting the Britain Stronger in Europe campaign's view that Turkey "is not an issue in this referendum and it shouldn't be". Vote Leave was accused of implying that 80 million Turks would come to the UK if it stayed in the EU. When interviewed in January 2019, he said he had not mentioned Turkey during the 2016 referendum campaign. In September 2016, Johnson pledged to help Turkey join the EU and expressed support for Recep Tayyip Erdoğan's government.

Johnson described the Gülen movement as a "cult" and supported Turkey's post-coup purges. He said that Turkey's coup attempt "was deeply violent, deeply anti-democratic, deeply sinister and it was totally right that it was crushed".

Johnson supported the Turkish invasion of northern Syria aimed at ousting the Syrian Kurds from the enclave of Afrin.

=== Saudi Arabian–led intervention in Yemen ===
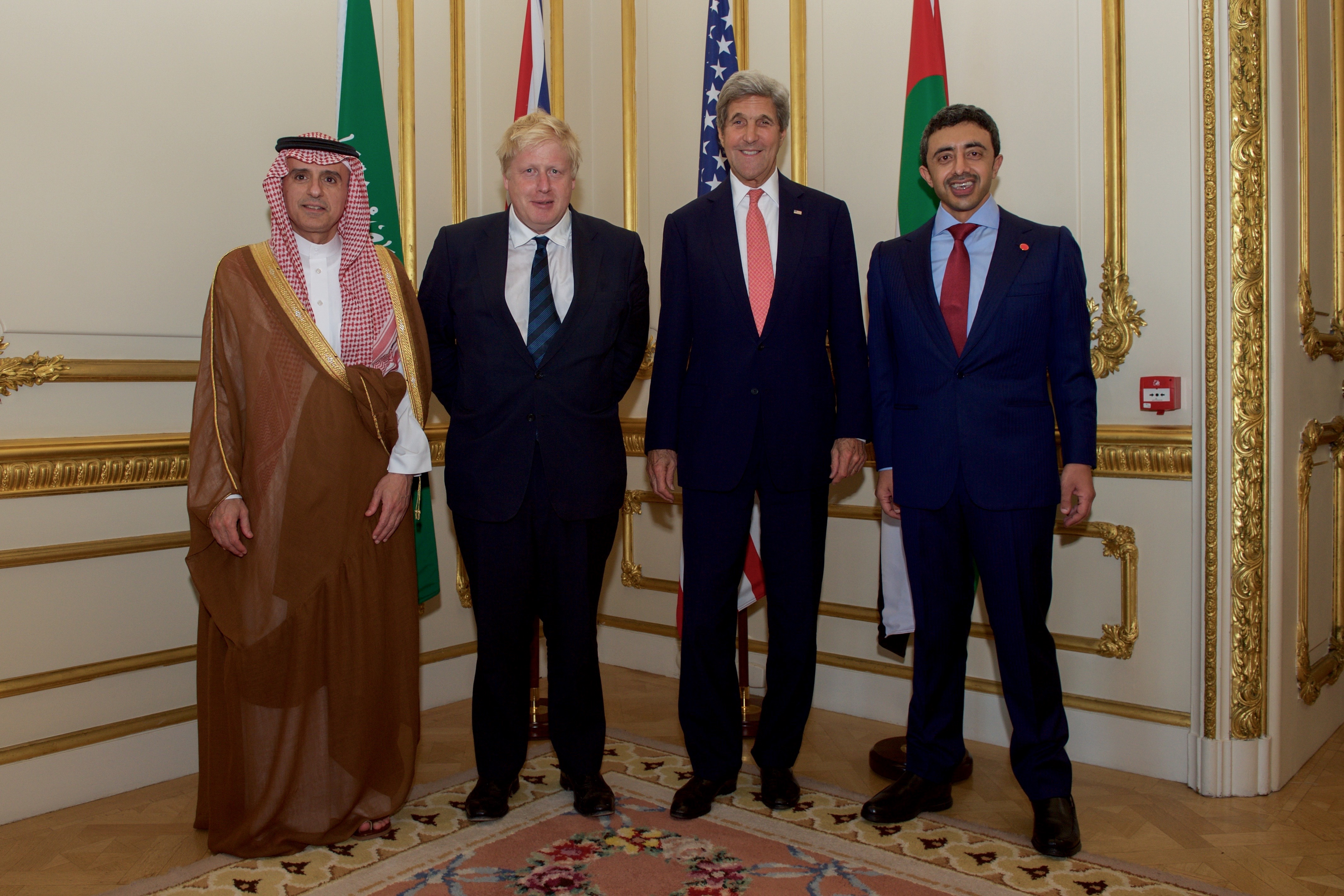
Foreign Ministers of the US, the UK, Saudi Arabia and the United Arab Emirates, before a working dinner focused on Yemen, 19 July 2016

Johnson supported the Saudi Arabian–led intervention in Yemen and refused to block UK arms sales to Saudi Arabia, stating there was no clear evidence of breaches of international humanitarian law by Saudi Arabia in the war in Yemen. In September 2016, human rights groups accused him of blocking the UN inquiry into Saudi war crimes in Yemen. Given the UK-Saudi alliance, in December, he attracted attention for commenting the Saudis were akin to the Iranians in "puppeteering and playing proxy wars" throughout the Middle East. May said his comments did not represent the government's view.

=== Iran nuclear deal ===
In May 2018, Johnson backed the Iran nuclear deal framework, despite Donald Trump's withdrawal. Johnson said the deal brought economic benefits to the Iranian people.

=== British Overseas Territories ===
In April 2017, Johnson said that Gibraltar's sovereignty was "not going to change" after Brexit. Johnson promised while in Northern Ireland that Brexit would leave the Irish border "absolutely unchanged".

Johnson visited the islands of Anguilla, and Tortola (in the British Virgin Islands) on 13 September 2017 to confirm the United Kingdom's commitment to helping restore British territories devastated by Hurricane Irma. He said he was reminded of photos of Hiroshima after the atom bomb had landed on it.

=== Tariffs on Indian whisky ===
In May 2017, during the 2017 general election, a woman criticised him for discussing ending tariffs on Indian whisky in a Sikh temple in Bristol (Sikhism prohibits alcohol use). He later expressed regret that the protester held differing views to his on alcohol.

=== Libya ===
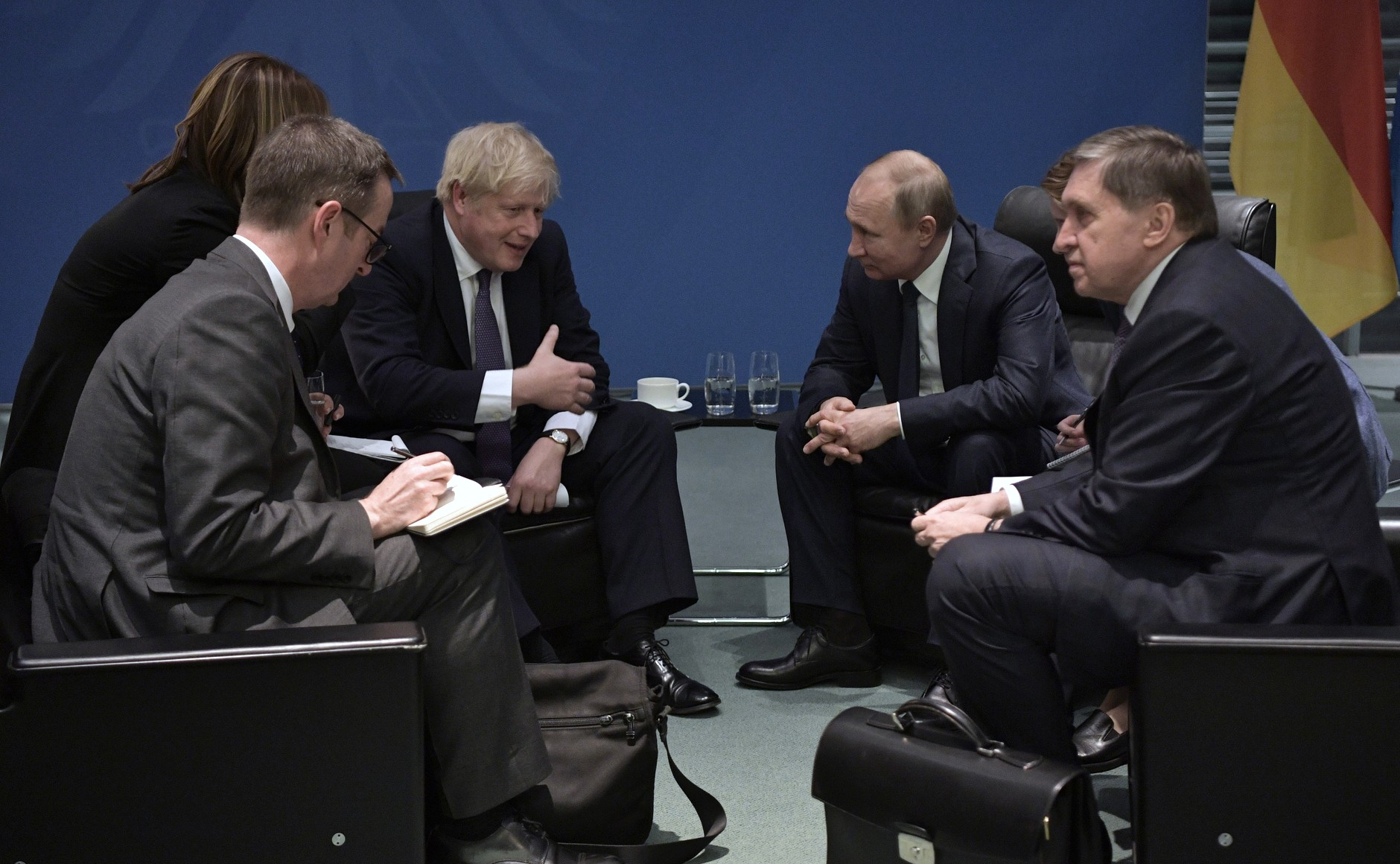
Johnson and Russian President Vladimir Putin at the Berlin Conference on Libya, 19 January 2020

In October 2017, he faced criticism for stating the Libyan city of Sirte could become an economic success like Dubai: "all they have to do is clear the dead bodies away".

=== 2017 Catalan independence referendum ===
Johnson did not condemn the actions of the Spanish government and police during the outlawed Catalan independence referendum on 1 October 2017.

=== Rohingya genocide ===
Johnson condemned the persecution of Rohingya Muslims in Myanmar, comparing the situation with the displacement of Palestinians in 1948.

=== Israel and Palestine ===
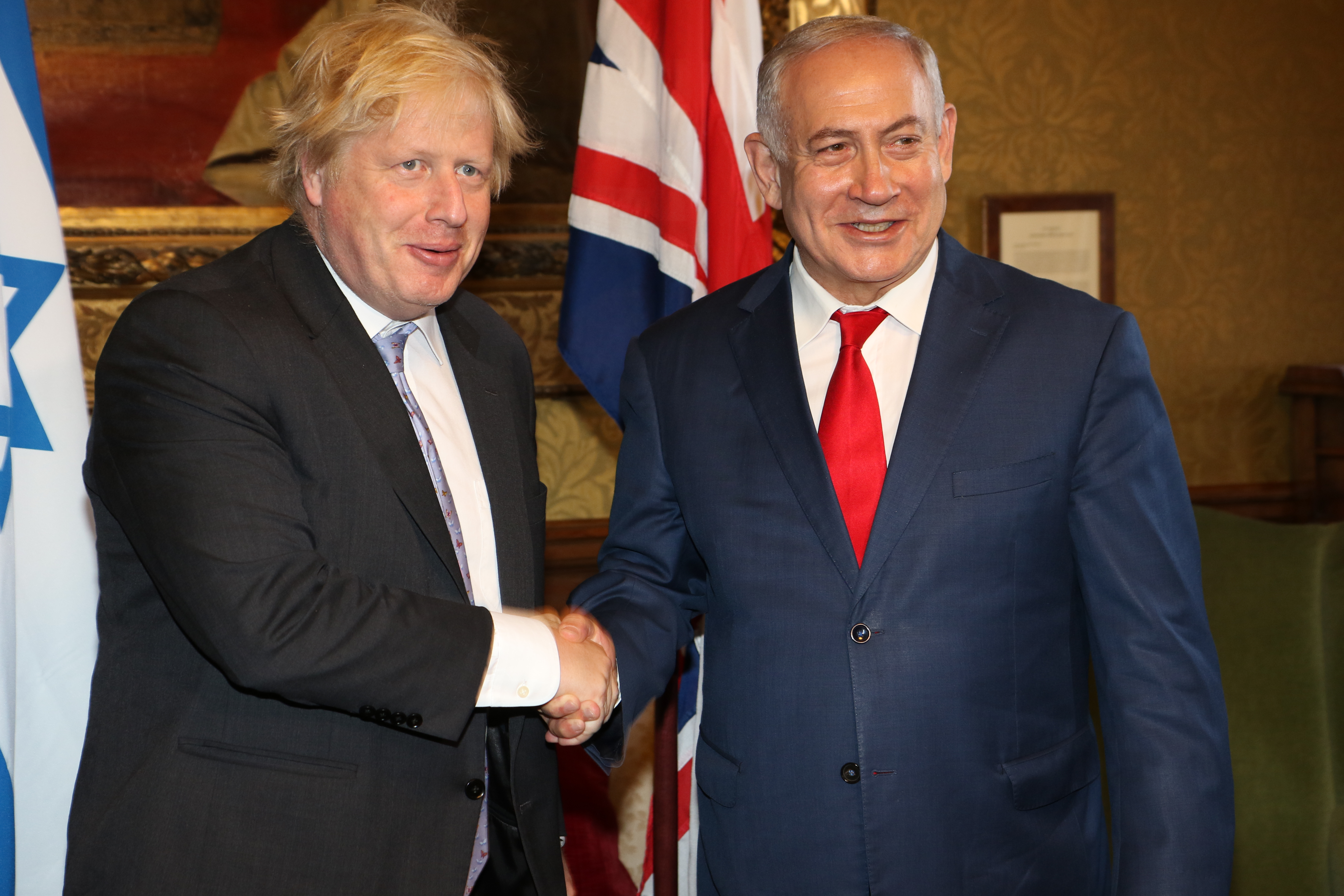
Johnson with Israel's Benjamin Netanyahu in June 2018

Johnson said that US recognition of Jerusalem as Israel's capital is a "moment of opportunity" for peace. In June 2018, Johnson accused the UNHRC of focusing disproportionately on the Israeli–Palestinian conflict and Israel's occupation of the Palestinian territories.

Amidst calls for the UK to stop selling arms to Israel during the Gaza war, Johnson opposed the notion, labeling it "insane" and arguing that it would effectively lead to "the military defeat of Israel and the victory of Hamas". He characterized the demand as "an example of the death wish of Western civilization" and condemned it as a call to "let the jihadis win".

Johnson opposes recognising Palestine as a sovereign state, which he argues would not advance the Israeli–Palestinian peace process. He believes that a Palestinian state does not have clearly defined borders and would be partially controlled by Hamas, which he described as an Islamofascist terrorist organisation. In 2025, he condemned Keir Starmer's decision to recognise Palestine as "ridiculous" and motivated by Labour's "[fear] of losing the votes of the Muslim community".

=== Chagos dispute ===
The United Kingdom and Mauritius dispute the sovereignty of the Chagos Archipelago in the Indian Ocean. In February 2019, the International Court of Justice in The Hague issued an advisory opinion stating that the UK must transfer the Chagos Archipelago to Mauritius. In June 2020, 30 British MPs – including Labour, SNP and Liberal Democrats – signed a letter calling on Prime Minister Johnson to act immediately on the ICJ ruling. Johnson disputed Mauritian claims to sovereignty over the Chagos.

=== Hong Kong and China ===
Johnson said in July 2019 that his government would be very "pro-China" in an interview with the Hong Kong broadcaster Phoenix TV. He voiced support for Chinese President Xi Jinping's infrastructure investment effort, the Belt and Road Initiative, and promised to keep the United Kingdom "the most open economy in Europe" for Chinese investment.

On 28 January, the UK government decided to let Huawei have a limited role in building its new 5G network and supplying new high-speed network equipment to wireless carriers, whilst ignoring the US government's warnings that it would sever intelligence sharing if they did not exclude the company. The UK government stated that they deemed Huawei as a high-risk vendor but decided against banning the company from its 5G network, and said instead that they had decided to "use Huawei in a limited way so we can collectively manage the risk". Several Conservative Party members, on their part, warned against using Huawei.

On 3 June 2020, Johnson announced that if China were to continue pursuing the Hong Kong national security law, the UK would offer 350,000 Hong Kong residents who are British National (Overseas) passport holders, and 2.6 million other eligible individuals, the chance to move to the UK, with the possibility of later applying for citizenship. China accused the UK of interfering in its internal affairs.

The UK joined the AUKUS defence pact with the United States and Australia in September 2021, which was interpreted as aiming to counter Chinese power in the Indo-Pacific region. The pact was denounced by China and caused a French backlash, as it usurped existing plans for Australia to procure French submarines. Johnson was dismissive of this, saying the pact was not intended to be adversarial towards China, and said that French officials should "prenez un grip about this and donnez-moi un break".

=== Afghanistan ===
On 8 July 2021, the day after saying he was "apprehensive" about the future of Afghanistan following what was then the impending withdrawal of US troops, whilst announcing the near completion of British troop withdrawal from Afghanistan, Johnson expressed the view that there was "no military path to victory for the Taliban". A few weeks later, following the fall of Kabul to the Taliban, he blamed the United States for the crisis caused by the withdrawal of US troops from Afghanistan, saying that NATO alliance members "could not continue this US-led mission, a mission conceived and executed in support of America, without American logistics, without US air power and without American might".

On 17 August, following the UK's removal of troops from Afghanistan and the fall of Kabul to the Taliban, Johnson announced a new scheme to resettle 20,000 Afghans in Britain.

=== UK–EU trade negotiation ===
Following the formal withdrawal from the European Union in January 2020, Johnson's government entered trade negotiations with the EU to agree on their future relationship before the end of the transition period on 31 December 2020. Fisheries was a major topic of the negotiations. On 16 October 2020 Johnson said that the UK "must get ready" for no trade deal with the EU. With negotiations continuing until days before the deadline, it was announced on 24 December 2020 that a trade deal had been agreed. Entitled the EU–UK Trade and Cooperation Agreement, it came into force provisionally on 1 January 2021, and formally on 1 May. A fisheries dispute between the UK and France occurred shortly afterwards. Introduction of new UK border checks were delayed until 2022 to minimise the disruption caused by the COVID-19 pandemic.

=== Russia and Ukraine ===
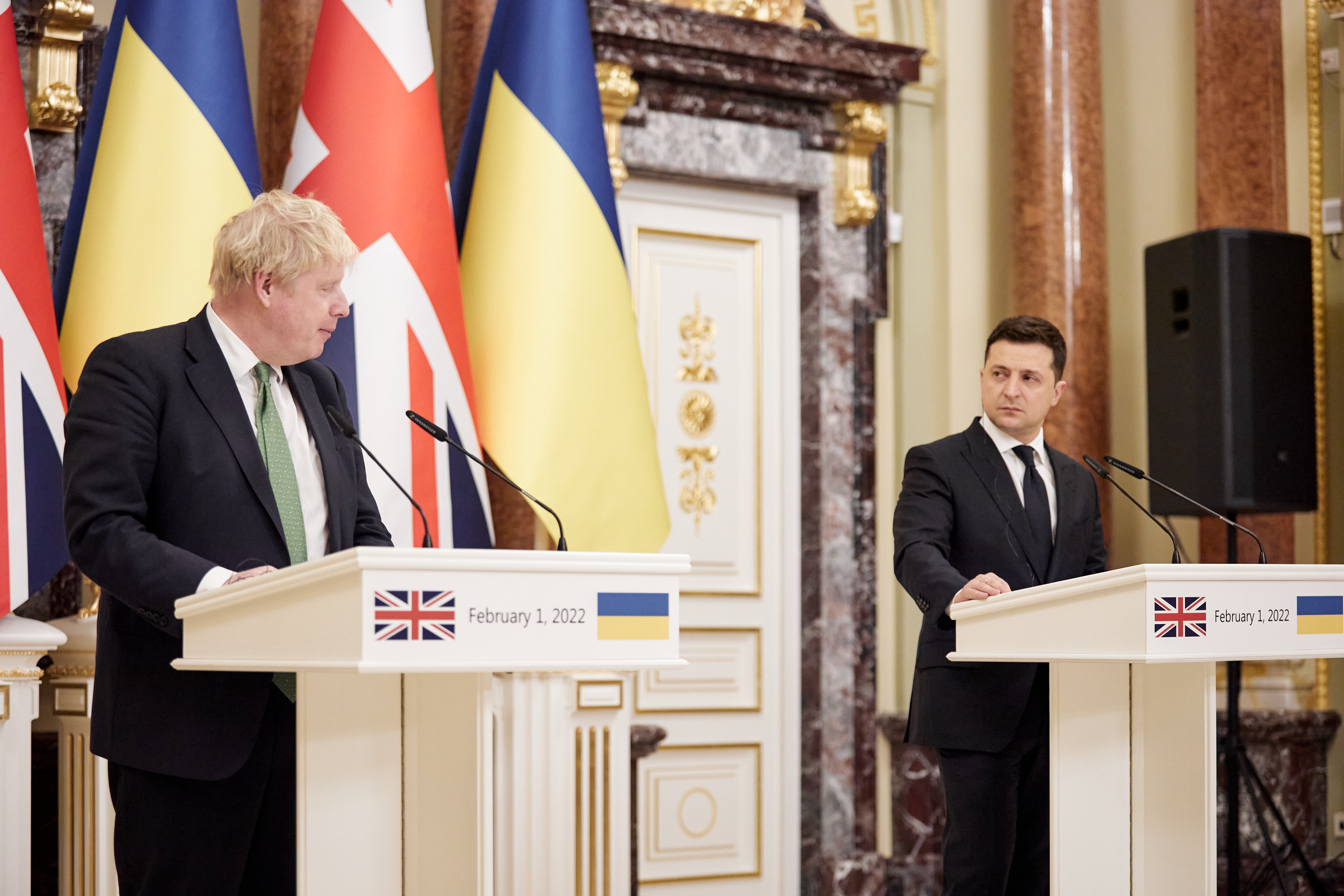
Boris Johnson and Ukrainian President Volodymyr Zelenskyy in February 2022

As Foreign Secretary, Johnson backed a more aggressive policy towards Russia. Following the March 2018 poisoning of Sergei and Yulia Skripal in Salisbury, an act which the UK government blamed on Russia, Johnson compared Vladimir Putin's hosting of the World Cup in Russia to Adolf Hitler's hosting of the Olympic Games in Berlin in 1936. Russia's Foreign Ministry denounced Johnson's "unacceptable and unworthy" parallel towards Russia, a "nation that lost millions of lives in fighting Nazism". Johnson described the Nord Stream 2 natural gas pipeline which runs from Russia to Germany as "divisive" and a "threat" that left Europe dependent on a "malign Russia" for its energy supplies. In November 2021, Johnson warned that the European Union faces "a choice" between "sticking up for Ukraine" and approving Nord Stream 2.

During the 2021–2022 Russo-Ukrainian crisis, Johnson's government warned the Russian Government not to invade Donbas. Despite this, Johnson's Foreign Secretary Liz Truss told BBC News that British troops were "unlikely" to be deployed. In a phone call to President Vladimir Putin, Johnson urged him to "avoid bloodshed". Johnson and Putin agreed in a phone call to work towards a "peaceful resolution". On 1 February 2022, Johnson arrived in Kyiv on a diplomatic visit. He called the presence of the Russian Armed Forces near the Russia–Ukraine border "the biggest security crisis that Europe has faced for decades". The Kremlin denied that it wanted to attack Ukraine. On 14 February 2022, Johnson warned an invasion of Ukraine could take place within 48 hours. On 20 February 2022, Johnson warned that Russia is planning the "biggest war in Europe since 1945" as Putin intends to invade and encircle the capital of Kyiv. On 21 February 2022, Johnson condemned Russia's diplomatic recognition of two self-proclaimed separatist republics in Donbas.

Johnson condemned the 2022 Russian invasion of Ukraine, and ensured the UK joined in international sanctions on Russian banks and oligarchs. He later announced the UK would phase out Russian oil by the end of 2022.

In July 2024, 2 years after Johnson's stepping down as prime minister, he proposed a "Ukrainian Peace Plan" to the US presidential candidate Donald Trump, which would involve the US supporting Ukraine in retaking territories it lost post February 24, 2022. It would also fast track the Ukrainian state's accession to NATO and the EU.

=== AUKUS ===
On 15 September 2021, Johnson, Australian Prime Minister Scott Morrison and US President Joe Biden announced AUKUS, a security pact between the United Kingdom, Australia and the United States seen as an initiative to counter the perceived dominance of China in the Pacific. French and Chinese officials criticised the agreement.

=== Finland and Sweden's NATO applications ===
Before Finland and Sweden applied for NATO membership, Johnson stated that the UK will be "steadfast and unequivocal in our support to both" during the application process. On 11 May, Johnson visited the prime ministers of Sweden and Finland and signed defense agreements with each, pledging to aid the countries in a crisis.

== See also ==
- Premiership of Boris Johnson
- First Johnson ministry (2019)
- Second Johnson ministry (2019–2022)
- Politics of the United Kingdom
