= Ian Clement =

British politician (born 1965)

Ian Clement (born 1965 in Bexley), was Deputy Mayor of London with responsibility for Government and External Relations. A former councillor and Leader of the London Borough of Bexley from 2006 to 2008, Clement was a member of the Conservative Party before being suspended following incidents involving financial issues both in London and Bexley.

== Biography ==
Clement was born on 19 February 1965. He has lived in Crayford all his life and was educated at Trinity School, Belvedere.

Before becoming involved in politics, Clement worked as a manager in both the public and private sector including Somerfield Stores.

== Bexley Council ==
Clement was elected as a Councillor for the London Borough of Bexley in 1998. Clement then served as vice-chairman of the Environmental Services Committee, Chairman of the Traffic and Transport Sub-Committee, Chairman of the Environment, Transport and Regeneration Scrutiny Committee, Shadow Cabinet/Opposition Spokesman for the Environment, Transport and Regeneration portfolio. He was elected Leader of the Opposition Conservative Group in 2003, having previously been Deputy Leader of the Group.

=== Leader of the Council ===
In May 2006, the Conservatives, led by Clement, defeated the previous Labour administration in the London Borough of Bexley. The previously ruling Labour group of 32 was reduced to 9 councillors. The results produced a council of 54 Conservative and 9 Labour councillors – a loss for Labour of 23 seats. Turnout was increased in all but one of the Borough's wards and was 42.35% overall. The election result meant that the London Borough of Bexley had the largest Conservative majority in London.

One of Clement's first tasks in office was to implement the initiative known as "Bexley First", a strategic repositioning exercise which refocused Bexley's corporate objectives and installed a "value for money" culture, which enabled below-inflation Council Tax increases for the first time in the Borough's history. "Bexley First" is intended to make the Council more streamlined and accessible, making it easier for people to access local services, through investment in new technology and innovative new delivery methods. The programme is due to deliver improved local services yet provide greater access to those services. It is also claimed to revitalise Bexleyheath Town Centre, through the redevelopment of the council's Civic Centre funded largely by the disposal of dispersed office premises scattered throughout the borough. The programme is expected to bring together the council's staff in these centralised offices, improving efficiency and delivery of services and promoting more flexible and modern ways of working. A development partner is expected to provide retail space fronting Broadway at ground level whilst providing a council chamber and sufficient administrative space above.

Another priority was the revocation of a contentious part-time westbound bus lane in Welling High Street, introduced by the Labour administration in concert with TfL.

In opposition, the Conservatives in the London Borough of Bexley had been fiercely opposed to the proposed Thames Gateway Bridge development. This opposition continued once Clement was Leader and included him calling for a reopening of the public inquiry into the bridge, and discussion with the then Local Government Secretary, Ruth Kelly. He worked closely with Action Group Against the Bridge and the plans for the bridge were eventually scrapped by the new Mayor, Boris Johnson in November 2008.

As Leader of the council, Clement also opposed the plans to site a Cory-promoted waste incinerator in the borough. This including teaming up with the then-mayor Ken Livingstone to apply for a judicial review of the application to site the incinerator. Clement was bitterly disappointed when the judicial review was refused and plans for the incinerator went ahead.

=== Work on London Councils' Executive ===
In October 2006, Clement was appointed to the Executive of London Councils as leading member of the Crime and Public Protection Portfolio. In this role, Clement led in overseeing strategy and policy initiatives to help the London Boroughs "build safer and stronger communities". He worked with Ministers and the Commissioner of the Metropolitan Police to ensure that the interests of London, and its boroughs, were fully recognised in the development of community safety policing and in the allocation of funding. The specific policy areas included anti-social behaviour, violent crime, domestic violence, community engagement and crime reduction, London Resilience and Emergency Planning.

== Boris Johnson, Mayor of London ==
=== Campaign Team ===
The London Borough of Bexley, under Clement was the first Conservative led London Borough to declare support for Boris Johnson in his bid to be Mayor of London. Clement was a senior member of Johnson's campaign team from October 2007 until Johnson became Mayor of London on 1 May 2008.

=== Deputy Mayor ===
On 6 May 2008, Clement was appointed as Deputy Mayor for Government and External Relations, to advise and lead on the Mayor's relationships with the Government and London Boroughs. Clement's salary was £124,364, the highest of Johnson's Deputies.

In August 2008, Clement represented London at the opening ceremony of the 2008 Summer Olympics in Beijing, China. Although he was in a relationship at the time, and pre-briefed by MI6, Clement later admitted that he had been lured into a honey trap by the Chinese secret service. After inviting a woman to his hotel room, was drugged to enable details from his BlackBerry to be downloaded and secret papers to be copied.

Clement also spoke on the radio in New York in January 2009 about closer co-operation between cities and what one city can learn from another.

Clement worked on Johnson's Quality of Life agenda, where Clement was responsible for increasing access to public toilets through open-access initiatives with various retailers, including Sainsbury's, Tesco, Asda, John Lewis Partnership), Marks and Spencer and Borders. Clement has also worked to secure Freedom Pass funding, which allowed disabled residents and all over 60s in London to travel on Transport for London during the morning peak, eradicating a long lasting hours' restriction.

=== Expenses scandal ===
In June 2009, Johnson suspended Clement's use of his GLA credit card, in light of revelations of his use of his official card. It emerged that Clement used the card to buy business class travel on two long-haul British Airways flights to China for the Beijing Olympics, only weeks after the Mayor insisted he was going to fly economy. He also used the card to pay for lunches and dinners with fellow Conservatives and a £700 meal in New York City. Clement broke GLA rules by using his card for "private expenditure" totalling £2,300, including more than £200 on groceries at Tesco and a £535.49 audio system for his Jaguar car, which he then repaid.

Clement was summoned in front of the Greater London Authority audit committee to explain himself, and faced pressure to resign or for Johnson to sack him after full details of his spending are revealed. Johnson initially declined to sack Clement, saying: "There's a difference between what is crass and what is appropriate, what makes me angry and what is actually dishonest. He shouldn't have been buying things on a corporate credit card, that is absolutely wrong. He did repay them, that was the critical thing for me." However, on 22 June, Clements submitted his resignation, which Johnson accepted with the words: "In the light of the further discrepancies in your expenses that have emerged this morning, it is clear to both of us that your position is untenable." .

On 4 September 2009 it was announced that Clement had been charged with five offences relating to the use of the credit card

During February 2010 Clement made some strong statements regarding the mayor's lack of respect for the Conservative leader David Cameron, highlighting in particular a serious difference of opinion over the wisdom of investigating the revived Marinair Thames estuary airport proposals for an international airport in the Thames Estuary, east of the Isle of Sheppey, a proposal seen by the mayor as a possible alternative to additional runways at London's existing airports.
