= Deputy Mayor of London for Culture and Creative Industries =

English local government position

The Deputy Mayor of London for Culture and Creative Industries is a position appointed by the Mayor of London with responsibility for policy concerning culture, media, sport, arts, heritage and tourism.

== Background ==
Before 2012, the functions performed by the Deputy Mayor of London for Culture and Creative Industries were performed by the Cultural Strategy Group within the Greater London Authority. It was composed of cultural figures in London.

== Responsibilities ==
The role has had a wide range of responsibilities including the following;

- policies concerning East Bank, a new creative quarter within the area of the London Legacy Development Corporation
- commissioning art for London Underground stations
- outreach to celebrities and other cultural figures
- managing the Borough of Culture scheme

== List of officeholders ==
Name	Portrait	Term of office		Mayor	Ref
Education and Culture
Munira Mirza		May 2012	May 2016	Boris Johnson	
Culture and Creative Industries
Justine Simons		1 July 2016	Incumbent	Sadiq Khan	
