= Deputy Mayor of London for Planning, Regeneration and the Fire Service =

English local government position

The Deputy Mayor of London for Planning, Regeneration and the Fire Service is a position appointed by the Mayor of London.

It combined the roles previously known as the Deputy Mayor of London for Planning, Regeneration and Skills (which was originally created as the Deputy Mayor of London for Policy and Planning) and the Deputy Mayor of London for Fire and Resilience.

The current holder is Jules Pipe.

== List of officeholders ==
Colour key (for political parties): Labour Conservative

=== List of Deputy Mayors for Planning, Regeneration and Skills ===
Name	Portrait	Term of office		Political party	Mayor	Ref
Policy and Planning
Simon Milton		2008	2011	Conservative	Boris Johnson	
Edward Lister		2011	2016	Conservative	Boris Johnson	
Planning, Regeneration and Skills
Jules Pipe		9 May 2016	May 2024	Labour	Sadiq Khan	

=== List of Deputy Mayors for Fire and Resilience ===
Name	Portrait	Term of office		Political party	Mayor	Ref
Fiona Twycross		1 April 2018	May 2024	Labour	Sadiq Khan	

=== List of Deputy Mayors of London for Planning, Regeneration and the Fire Service ===
Name	Portrait	Term of office		Political party	Mayor
Jules Pipe		May 2024	Incumbent	Labour	Sadiq Khan
