= The Churchill Factor =

2014 non-fiction book by Boris Johnson

- First edition
- Author: Boris Johnson
- Language: English
- Subject: Winston Churchill
- Genre: History, biography, political
- Publisher: Hodder & Stoughton
- Publication date: 23 October 2014
- Publication place: United Kingdom
- Pages: 432
- ISBN: 978-1444783056

The Churchill Factor: How One Man Made History is a book by British politician, journalist and former Prime Minister of the United Kingdom, Boris Johnson, in which he details the life of former Prime Minister Sir Winston Churchill. It was originally published on 23 October 2014 by Hodder & Stoughton. The 2015 French edition, published by Éditions Stock as Winston: Comment un seul homme a fait l'histoire, used Richard Deane Taylor's 1951 portrait of Winston Churchill as its cover artwork.

== Summary ==
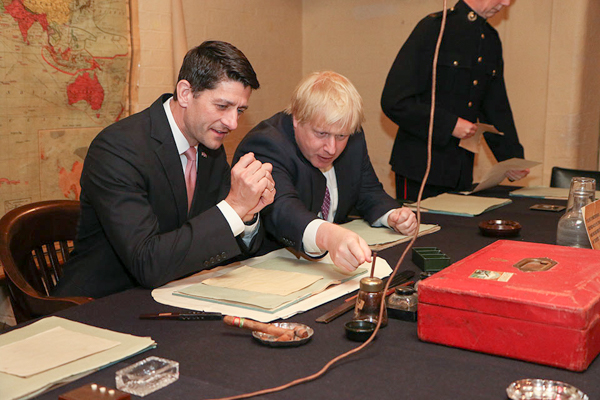
Johnson showing US politician Paul Ryan the Churchill War Rooms from World War II

Throughout the book, Johnson details the life of statesman, soldier and writer, and former Prime Minister Sir Winston Churchill. Johnson praises Churchill's efforts as the leader during the Second World War, writing that "he alone saved our civilisation".

He was eccentric, over the top, camp, with his own special trademark clothes – and a thoroughgoing genius... From his very emergence as a young Tory MP he had bashed and satirised his own party... There were too many Tories who thought of him as an unprincipled opportunist... His enemies detected in him a titanic egotism, a desire to find whatever wave or wavelet he could, and surf it long after it had dissolved into spume on the beach... He did behave with a death-defying self-belief, and go farther out on a limb than anyone else might have thought wise.

== Reception ==
In the wake of its publication, John Kampfner of The Observer said the book featured "not so subtle" attempts to draw a parallel between Johnson and Churchill.

In The Daily Telegraph, Con Coughlin wrote "While Johnson is clearly an admirer of Churchill, it can be difficult to see what new insights he brings to the study of the statesman. The obvious subtext, of course, is that Johnson is seeking to compare his own reputation as a political maverick with that of Churchill, which poses the question: what would Winston Churchill have made of Boris Johnson?"

Another review said "like its characterisation of some of Churchill's own writings, this book is 'crisp, punchy, full of the kind of wham-bam short sentences that keep the reader moving down the page'."

Sonia Purnell, in The Independent, said "He does have a certain genius – as displayed in his previous The Dream of Rome book – for making history, in that dreaded term, 'accessible'... The book says perhaps less about Churchill than it does about the ambition and self-image of Boris [Johnson]. In history-book terms, it is an opportunity missed. For Johnson's career, it will no doubt work wonders."

In the New Statesman, Richard J. Evans said "The book reads as if it was dictated, not written. All the way through we hear Boris's voice; it's like being cornered in the Drones Club and harangued for hours by Bertie Wooster." The Times also noted the book's "Bertie Woosterish voice", while describing its approach as "never boring, genuinely clever in parts, hopelessly biased in its judgments and sometimes irritating to the point of call-in-the-stretchers exhaustion in its verbal bumble".

Dominic Sandbrook, reviewing the work for the Evening Standard, wrote that The Churchill Factor "bears about as much relation to a history book as an episode of Doctor Who does to a BBC4 documentary".

British Conservative Party MP and Churchill's Grandson Nicholas Soames commented, Johnson's book was a "Good book, very readable, but not a work of great scholarship nor anything new in it".
