= Trinity School, Belvedere =

Trinity Church of England School, Belvedere
- Coat of arms of the School

Location
- Erith Road; Belvedere, Greater London, DA17 6HT; England; 51.4858°N 0.1613°E

Information
- Type: Academy; Comprehensive
- Motto: "God working with us, and through us."
- Religious affiliation: Church of England
- Department for Education URN: 136538 Tables
- Ofsted: Reports
- Chair of Governors: Simon Godden
- Principal: John Willoughby
- Religious head: Canon David Herbert
- Gender: Mixed
- Age: 11 to 18
- Enrolment: 1066
- Colours: White; Gold; Red; Blue
- Selective: No
- Academy Trust: Trinitas Academy Trust
- Website: http://www.trinity.bexley.sch.uk

Trinity School is a Church of England Secondary Academy located in Belvedere in the London Borough of Bexley. It is a mixed non-selective school located within a selective borough.

== Introduction ==
Trinity School is the only Church of England secondary school in the London Borough of Bexley, an area with grammar schools. In the Diocese of Rochester, it acts as the lead school in the Trinitas Trust. It became an academy in April 2011.

It is an average-sized secondary school. Approximately half of the pupils are White British and a third of pupils are from a Black African heritage. The proportion of pupils who are eligible for support through the pupil premium funding is in line with the national average; these pupils are entitled to free school meals, or are in the care of the local authority. The school has a higher than average proportion of disabled pupils, and the percentage of children with special educational needs is also above the national average.

The Trinitas Academy Trust has three schools, joining Trinity with Christ Church (Erith) and St Augustine of Canterbury Primary Schools. The Academy Trust is led by a Board of Directors, which includes members of the governing bodies, and representatives of the Bishop of Rochester and the Diocesan Board of Education. A Chief Executive has overall responsibility for the Trust, and the Primary Academies are led by an Executive Head Teacher working with Heads of School.

== Curriculum ==
Virtually all maintained schools and academies follow the National Curriculum, and are inspected by Ofsted on how well they succeed in delivering a 'broad and balanced curriculum'. Schools try to get all students to achieve the English Baccalaureate (EBacc) qualification; this must include core subjects, a modern foreign language, and either History or Geography.

Key Stage 3

Trinity operates a three-year Key Stage 3 (KS3), in which all required National Curriculum subjects are taught.

Pupils study the following subjects:

- Art
- Catering
- ICT & Computer Science
- Citizenship
- Design & Technology
- English
- Expressive Arts
- Geography
- History
- Maths
- Modern Foreign Languages
- Music
- Physical Education
- Religious Education
- Science

Key Stage 4

At Key Stage 4 pupils may take any of the KS3 subjects, except citizenship, as a GCSE qualification. However, all pupils must study English Language, English Literature, Mathematics, Science, and ICT, or choose from a new course such as:

- Business Studies
- Computing
- Construction
- Dance
- Drama
- Media Studies
- Psychology
- Science (Additional or Triple)
- Sociology
- Government & Politics
- Law

Sixth Form

Once pupils reach Sixth Form (Key Stage 5), they can then choose between vocational and academic pathways, studying either for traditional A Levels or a set of courses aimed at developing skills for the workplace.

Sixth Form pupils are no longer required to wear full school uniform, but are required to dress in smart business attire.

== Extra-curricular activities ==
The extra curricular activities in the PE department include:

- Football
- Netball
- Rowing
- Badminton
- Basketball
- Tennis
- Rugby
- Hockey

As well as sports there are academic extra - circular activities which are:

- Politics Debate Club
- Model House of Commons Debates
- Model United Nations Conferences
- ICT Club
- Homework Club

== Notable former pupils ==
- Tony Discipline who plays Tyler Moon in the BBC 1 soap EastEnders
