= Jules Pipe =

British politician

Jules Pipe CBE
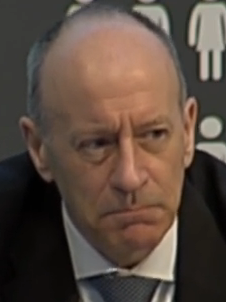

Deputy Mayor for Planning, Regeneration and Skills
- Incumbent
- Assumed office 9 May 2016
- Mayor: Sadiq Khan
- Preceded by: Office created

Mayor of Hackney
- In office 21 October 2002 – 20 July 2016
- Deputy: Sophie Linden; Philip Glanville
- Preceded by: New Position
- Succeeded by: Philip Glanville

Personal details
- Born: May 1965 (age 61)
- Party: Labour
- Website: Office website (2016)

CBE ribbon

Julian Benjamin Pipe CBE (born May 1965) is a British politician who currently serves as the Deputy Mayor of London for Planning, Regeneration and the Fire Service. Pipe was the first directly elected mayor of the London Borough of Hackney between his election in October 2002 and his resignation in the summer of 2016.

He worked as a journalist for The Sunday Telegraph until taking on the full-time position as mayor. The council was short-listed for Council of the Year in 2010 in what was described as a "Meteoric rise".

Pipe was elected as a Labour party councillor in Stoke Newington in 1996, later representing the King's Park Ward. He was re-elected at the May 2006 mayoral election, the May 2010 mayoral election and subsequently in the May 2014 mayoral election. He was Leader of Hackney Council from June 2001 to October 2002.

On 30 June 2016 Pipe was appointed the Deputy Mayor for Planning, Regeneration and Skills by Mayor of London, Sadiq Khan, and resigned on 20 July 2016 as Mayor of Hackney to take up the post. He was succeeded by Philip Glanville who was reelected for a second term in 2018.

Pipe has launched the Skills for Londoners Capital Fund, investing in digital skills, designs and facilities specifically tailored for disabled Londoners and those with special education needs.

Civic offices
New office	Mayor of Hackney; 2002 – 2016	Succeeded by Philip Glanville
