= Ray Lewis (youth worker) =

British youth worker (1963–2024)

Ray Arthur Lewis CBE (21 March 1963 – 29 March 2024) was a Guyanese-born British youth worker who was a Deputy Mayor of London.

== Career ==
Ray Lewis was founder and director of Eastside Young Leaders' Academy, a youth leadership development organisation based in the Newham, east London. Other roles included Senior Advisor to the Mayor of London, Boris Johnson, focusing on solutions to youth crime and mentoring.

Lewis was educated in a school in Walthamstow. He began his career in the civil service, then studied Theology at Middlesex University. He later worked as a prison service manager at HM Prison Woodhill in Milton Keynes.

Lewis' charity was established in 2002. There are now five other similar projects across the UK based on the YLA model.

=== Deputy Mayor ===
Lewis was appointed as Deputy Mayor of London in May 2008 by new Mayor Boris Johnson.

==== Misconduct allegations ====
On 3 July 2008, Mayor of London Boris Johnson announced an independent inquiry into multiple allegations including financial misconduct, to be headed by Martin Narey, the former chief of the Prison and Probation Service.

The allegations included claims that Lewis had been entrusted with £25,000 from a woman in the congregation in the Parish of St Matthew, West Ham in the Diocese of Chelmsford. Lewis also claimed in his official biography to be a Justice of the Peace, which was later denied by the Ministry of Justice. The financial allegations were denied by Lewis as 'complete rubbish' and as an attempt to 'smear' his reputation.

It also emerged that he had been barred from working in the Church of England after allegations of financial and sexual misconduct. Lewis was placed on the Lambeth and Bishopthorpe Register—the so-called "Lambeth List"—which prohibits people from public ministry and preaching, from 1999 to 2005.

On 4 July 2008, Lewis resigned as a result of these allegations of misconduct. He returned to work for Boris Johnson in a voluntary role as "ambassador for mentoring" in 2010 before taking a similar paid position in 2013, working one day per week for a salary of £20,000.

Lewis was one of nine of Boris Johnson's aides to receive approximately £50,000 as a "golden goodbye" after Johnson's last term as mayor.

== Personal life ==
Born in Guyana on 21 March 1963, Lewis had three daughters. He was a social entrepreneur, life coach and expert in transformational programmes for youth.

Lewis was appointed a commander of the Order of the British Empire in the 2022 Prime Minister's Resignation Honours for political and public service.

On 29 March 2024, Lewis died at the age of 61.
