= Mayor's Office for Policing and Crime =

English government body

- Coat of arms of the Greater London Authority

Functional body overview
- Formed: 16 January 2012
- Preceding functional body: Metropolitan Police Authority
- Jurisdiction: Metropolitan Police District
- Headquarters: City Hall, Kamal Chunchie Way, London, E16 1ZE
- Functional body executives: Sadiq Khan, Mayor of London; Kaya Comer-Schwartz, Deputy Mayor for Policing and Crime
- Parent department: Greater London Authority
- Website: www.london.gov.uk/what-we-do/mayors-office-policing-and-crime-mopac

The Mayor's Office for Policing and Crime (MOPAC) is a functional body of the Greater London Authority responsible for oversight of the Metropolitan Police. It came into being on 16 January 2012, replacing the Metropolitan Police Authority, as envisaged by the Police Reform and Social Responsibility Act 2011. The current Deputy Mayor for Policing and Crime is Kaya Comer-Schwartz.

== Structure ==
The office is headed by the Mayor of London. The mayor acts in a similar capacity to the police and crime commissioners elsewhere in England.

The mayor can appoint a Deputy Mayor for Policing and Crime to act on their behalf. The mayor and the deputy mayor are scrutinised by the Police and Crime Committee of the London Assembly.

Although the office is responsible for strategic oversight of the Metropolitan Police, all operational policing decisions remain the responsibility of the Commissioner of Police of the Metropolis.

The office lacks the powers to appoint or dismiss the commissioner; these are powers of the Home Secretary, but the Home Secretary must take into account any recommendations of the mayor.

== Leadership ==
=== Deputy Mayor of London for Policing and Crime ===
- Kit Malthouse (2012)
- Stephen Greenhalgh (2012–2016)
- Sophie Linden (2016–2024)
- Kaya Comer-Schwartz (2024–present)

=== Chief Executive ===
- Catherine Crawford (2012)
- Rebecca Lawrence (2016–2019)
- Diana Luchford (2020–2024)
- Darren Mepham (2024–2025)
- Rena Lalgie (2025–present)
