= Deputy Mayor of London for Policing and Crime =

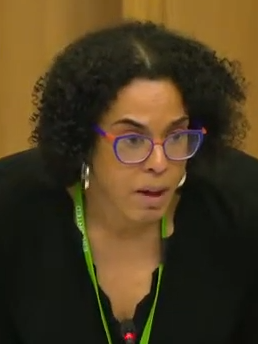
- Incumbent; Kaya Comer-Schwartz since 23 October 2024
- Mayor's Office for Policing and Crime
- Type: Deputy Mayor of London
- Status: Similar to police and crime commissioner
- Abbreviation: DMPC
- Reports to: Mayor of London
- Appointer: Mayor of London
- Precursor: Metropolitan Police Authority
- Formation: 16 January 2012
- First holder: Kit Malthouse

The Deputy Mayor of London for Policing and Crime (DMPC) is head of the Mayor's Office for Policing and Crime, part of the Greater London Authority. The current office holder is Kaya Comer-Schwartz.

Outside of powers to issue a Police and Crime Plan, and to appoint and remove senior Met officers, the role of Deputy Mayor for Policing and Crime in London is similar to that of an elected police and crime commissioner elsewhere.

Kit Malthouse was the first Deputy Mayor for Policing and Crime, taking on this role at the abolition of the Metropolitan Police Authority. On the re-election of Boris Johnson he was replaced by Stephen Greenhalgh.

The current incumbent is Kaya Comer-Schwartz, who was confirmed as replacing Sophie Linden on 23 October 2024.

== List of deputy mayors for policing and crime ==
Colour key
(for political parties)
Labour
Conservative
Independent

Name	Portrait	Term of office		Political party	Mayor
Policing
Kit Malthouse		2008	2012	Conservative	Boris Johnson
Policing and Crime
Kit Malthouse		16 January 2012	9 May 2012	Conservative	Boris Johnson
Stephen Greenhalgh		6 June 2012	9 May 2016	Conservative	Boris Johnson
Sophie Linden		9 May 2016	7 October 2024	Labour	Sadiq Khan
Kaya Comer-Schwartz		23 October 2024	Incumbent	Labour	Sadiq Khan
