= Stephen Greenhalgh, Baron Greenhalgh =

British Conservative politician and life peer

The Right Honourable The Lord Greenhalgh
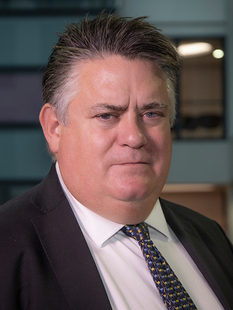
- Official portrait, 2022

Minister of State for Building Safety and Fire
- In office 18 March 2020 – 8 July 2022
- Prime Minister: Boris Johnson
- Preceded by: The Viscount Younger of Leckie (Faith and Communities)
- Succeeded by: Sarah Dines

Deputy Mayor for Policing and Crime
- In office 6 June 2012 – 9 May 2016
- Mayor: Boris Johnson
- Preceded by: Kit Malthouse
- Succeeded by: Sophie Linden

Member of the House of Lords
- Lord Temporal
- Life peerage 16 April 2020

Hammersmith and Fulham London Borough Councillor for Town Ward
- In office 25 January 1996 – 22 May 2014
- Preceded by: Antony C. Glover
- Succeeded by: Andrew Brown

Personal details
- Born: 4 September 1967 (age 59) Watford, Hertfordshire, England
- Party: Conservative
- Children: 3
- Education: St Paul's School; Trinity College, Cambridge (MA)
- Profession: Businessman politician

Stephen John Greenhalgh, Baron Greenhalgh (born 4 September 1967) is a British businessman and politician, and was the second Deputy Mayor for Policing and Crime in London. He is a member of the Conservative Party. In April 2020 he was created Baron Greenhalgh. He has also served on the advisory board for Great British PAC, a pressure group since 2024.

== Early life and education ==
Greenhalgh was born in Watford, spending most of his childhood in London. His mother was expelled from Czechoslovakia, and his father, Roger Greenhalgh, was a surgeon. He attended St Paul's School, where he was a Senior Foundation Scholar. In 1985, he went up to read History and Law at Trinity College, Cambridge, where he was a Perry Exhibitioner. There he took part in rowing and rugby, and in 1988 he was President of the Cambridge Union Society.

He graduated in 1989 and worked as a brand manager for Procter & Gamble until 1994. That year, he became a management consultant at PricewaterhouseCoopers. In 1999, with no medical training he became the Managing Director of BIBA Medical, a business he started with help from his father, Professor Roger Greenhalgh, who at the time was Dean of Charing Cross and Westminster Medical School.

== Political career ==
Greenhalgh began his political career in the local politics of the London Borough of Hammersmith and Fulham, first standing for election in 1994 in Sands End, a relatively poor ward within Fulham. He was unsuccessful. In a by-election in 1996, he was elected to the Hammersmith and Fulham London Borough Council in the Town ward, at a time when the Conservatives were in opposition on the Council. Two years later, he became the Conservative spokesman on social services. Then, in 1999, he became the deputy leader of the Conservative group, and in 2003 the group leader.

In 2006, Greenhalgh led the Conservatives to win Hammersmith and Fulham Council from Labour (May 4). The Conservatives won over 50 per cent of the popular vote and, with 33 out of 46 councillors.

In 2008, Greenhalgh was appointed by Eric Pickles, the then Shadow Secretary of State for Communities and Local Government, to head the new Conservative Councils Innovation Unit to formulate new local-government policy, and he was also appointed by the new Mayor of London, Boris Johnson, to oversee a financial audit of the Greater London Authority.

At the next elections in 2010, the Conservatives under Greenhalgh lost two Council seats but still retained a large majority. During his time on the Council, Greenhalgh became famous for being a cost-cutter, for which he has received both praise and criticism.

In 2012, pursuant to section 3 of the Police Reform and Social Responsibility Act 2011 ('the act'), the Metropolitan Police Authority was abolished and replaced with the Mayor's Office for Policing and Crime. On 6 June 2012, Greenhalgh was appointed, by Boris Johnson, to head the MOPAC, as the second Deputy Mayor for Policing and Crime. To take up this position, Greenhalgh resigned from his roles as Council leader and Councillor and was succeeded as leader by Nick Botterill. Although Greenhalgh was no longer an elected official, the Mayor was permitted to appoint him by sections 19 and 20 of the act.

In February 2014, Greenhalgh publicly endorsed Johnson's proposal to equip the police with water cannon to be used in the event of a serious outbreak of public disorder.

However, the water cannon bought by Boris Johnson for £322k were sold for scrap for just £11k having never been used after the Conservative Home Secretary, Theresa May, banned the police from using them.

In December 2014, Greenhalgh became the third declared candidate for the Conservative Party nomination in the 2016 London mayoral election.

On 18 March 2020 Boris Johnson appointed him as an unpaid joint Minister of State at the Ministry of Housing, Communities and Local Government and the Home Office.

=== House of Lords ===
On 16 April 2020 he was created Baron Greenhalgh, of Fulham in the London Borough of Hammersmith and Fulham.

In July 2022, he resigned as a minister during the government crisis. He has served on the advisory board for Great British PAC, a pressure group.

== Controversy ==
Greenhalgh was the subject of controversy in the first months of his appointment as the Deputy Mayor for Policing and Crime. He apologised after a colleague stated that he had patted her on the bottom, despite the fact she did not make an official complaint, and that he said he had no recollection of the alleged incident. Greenhalgh sacked both the Chief Executive and Deputy Chief Executive of MOPAC, with both of them being subject to non-disclosure agreements. He also had difficult relations with members of the London Assembly.

However, Greenhalgh has also been the subject of praise. The Daily Telegraph has often named him among the "Top 100 most influential Right-wingers". He ranked 88 in 2009, 71 in 2010 and 84 in 2011. ConservativeHome named him the "Local Hero of the Year" for 2007/2008, after having received 8000 votes for him from the website's readers.

== Personal life ==
Greenhalgh is married with three children and lives in Fulham, west London. His interests include motoring and tennis. He speaks French, German, and Italian. Since 2006, he has been a Trustee of the Camelia Botnar Arterial Research Foundation and since 2012 a governor of Hurlingham & Chelsea School.

Orders of precedence in the United Kingdom
Preceded by The Lord Grimstone of Boscobel	Gentlemen; Baron Greenhalgh	Followed by The Lord Frost
