= Oxford Street Development Corporation =

Mayoral development corporation in London

- Abbreviation: OSDC
- Formation: 1 January 2026
- Type: Mayoral development corporation
- Headquarters: London
- Location: Oxford Street
- Chairman: Scott Parsons
- Chief executive: Nabeel Khan
- Parent organisation: Greater London Authority
- Website: www.london.gov.uk/who-we-are/city-halls-partners/oxford-street-development-corporation-osdc

Oxford Street Development Corporation (OSDC) is the mayoral development corporation established on 1 January 2026 for the area around Oxford Street in Central London.

== Background ==
The mayoral development corporation proposal was first announced in September 2024 after plans by the mayor of London to pedestrianise Oxford Street had failed.

== Pedestrianisation ==
Transport for London replaced Westminster City Council as highway authority in September 2025.

In September 2026, the OSDC announced that Oxford Street would be pedestrianised from 26 October.

== Board ==
As of March 2026, board membership:

- Adam Hug (representing Westminster City Council)
- Asma Khan
- Caroline Rush
- Dee Corsi (non-voting position representing the New West End Company)
- Emir Feisal
- Es Devlin
- Geoff Barraclough (nominated by Westminster City Council)
- Howard Dawber
- Kate Willard
- Keith Edelman
- Margaret Casely-Hayford
- Penny Bagnall-Smith (nominated by Westminster City Council)
- Richard Olszewski (representing Camden Council)
- Scott Parsons (Chair)

== Committees ==
Creation of a planning committee chaired by Margaret Casely-Hayford was approved at a board meeting on 27 February 2026.
