= West Central (London Assembly constituency) =

- Territorial constituency for the London Assembly
- West Central shown within London
- Created: 2000
- Number of members: One
- Member: James Small-Edwards
- Party: Labour
- Last election: 2024
- Next election: 2028

West Central is a constituency represented on the London Assembly. The seat is currently held by James Small-Edwards from the Labour Party.

It covers the combined area of the City of Westminster, the London Borough of Hammersmith and Fulham and the Royal Borough of Kensington and Chelsea, much larger than the West Central postcode area.

== History ==
Since the seat's creation in 2000, the elected Assembly Member (AM) until 2024 had always been a Conservative candidate: three have represented the seat in succession. Its first AM was Angie Bray, who subsequently served as MP for Ealing Central and Acton. She was followed by Kit Malthouse in 2008, who was elected as MP for North West Hampshire in 2015, thus acting as an AM and MP for the remainder of his term on the London Assembly. He was succeeded in 2016 by Tony Devenish, who has been a councillor for Knightsbridge and Belgravia in Westminster (part of the GLA seat) since 2006.

At the time of the 2016 London Assembly elections, two of the MPs for the five parliamentary constituencies covered by this seat were members of the Labour Party, and the other three from the Conservatives; Labour have always been the main challenger in the corresponding GLA seat. It includes a number of affluent areas which have tended to vote for Conservative candidates in local and general elections, accounting for the results to date.

After the 2016 election, defeated candidate Mandy Richards lodged an election petition claiming that the results showed a discrepancy in turnout and that 15,000–20,000 postal votes were missing. The case was heard on 8 and 9 December 2016; the result was that all aspects of the petition were dismissed.

== Overlapping constituencies ==
Since 2024, the West Central Assembly constituency comprises all of the following UK Parliament constituencies:

- Chelsea and Fulham (Labour)
- Hammersmith (Labour)
- Kensington and Bayswater (Labour)
- Queen’s Park and Maida Vale (Labour)
- Cities of London and Westminster (Labour)

From 2010 to 2024, the West Central Assembly constituency comprised all of the following UK Parliament constituencies:

- Chelsea and Fulham (Conservative)
- Hammersmith (Labour)
- Kensington (Conservative)
- Westminster North (Labour)
- Cities of London and Westminster (Conservative)

== Assembly members ==
Election	Member	Party
2000	Angie Bray	Conservative
2008	Kit Malthouse	Conservative
2016	Tony Devenish	Conservative
2024	James Small-Edwards	Labour

== Assembly election results ==
=== 2020s ===
2024 London Assembly election: West Central
Party	Candidate	Constituency			List		
Party	Candidate	Votes	%	±%	Votes	%	±%
Labour	James Small-Edwards	46,831	37.7	+0.4	45,102	36.2	+3.5
Conservative	Tony Devenish	42,578	34.2	-4.6	39,049	31.3	-5.0
Liberal Democrats	Christophe Noblet	14,505	11.7	+2.2	11,223	9.0	+1.4
Green	Rajiv Rahul Sinha	12,427	10.0	-1.6	11,717	9.4	-2.1
Reform	Nicola Pateman	8,040	6.5	+5.1	5,856	4.7	+3.8
Rejoin EU					4,533	3.6	+1.1
Animal Welfare					1,967	1.6	-0.1
Britain First					1,147	0.9	New
CPA					1,014	0.8	0.0
SDP					986	0.8	+0.5
Independent	Laurence Fox				838	0.7	New
Communist					528	0.4	+0.1
Independent	Farah London				312	0.3	New
Heritage					221	0.2	-0.4
Independent	Gabe Romualdo				61	0.1	New
Majority		4,253	3.5	N/A			
Valid votes		124,381			124,554		
Invalid votes		1,143			983		
Turnout		125,524	34.94		125,537	34.95	
Labour gain from Conservative		Swing					

2021 London Assembly election: West Central
Party	Candidate	Constituency			List		
Party	Candidate	Votes	%	±%	Votes	%	±%
Conservative	Tony Devenish	55,163	38.9	-5.3	51,435	36.3	
Labour	Rita Begum	52,938	37.3	+2.6	46,364	32.7	
Green	Zack Polanski	16,427	11.6	+2.4	16,320	11.5	
Liberal Democrats	Ted Townsend	13,462	9.5	+3.6	10,742	7.6	
Rejoin EU					3,591	2.5	
Women's Equality					2,630	1.9	
Animal Welfare					2,438	1.7	
Reform	Saradhi Rajan	1,954	1.4	New	1,332	0.9	
CPA					1,157	0.8	
Let London Live	Heiko Khoo	1,977	1.4	New	1,121	0.8	
London Real					1,082	0.7	
UKIP					998	0.7	
Heritage					903	0.6	
Communist					460	0.3	
SDP					423	0.3	
TUSC					312	0.2	
Londependence Party					268	0.2	
National Liberal					112	0.1	
Majority		2,225	1.6	−7.9			
Turnout		137,990					
Conservative hold		Swing					

=== 2010s ===
2016 London Assembly election: West Central
Party	Candidate	Votes	%	±%
Conservative	Tony Devenish	67,775	44.2	−6.2
Labour	Mandy Richards	53,211	34.7	+4.2
Green	Jennifer Nadel	14,050	9.2	+0.5
Liberal Democrats	Annabel Mullin	10,577	5.9	−1.0
UKIP	Clive Egan	7,708	5.0	+1.5
Majority		14,564	9.5	−10.4
Turnout		153,321	45.0	+5.8
Conservative hold		Swing	-5.2	

2012 London Assembly election: West Central
Party	Candidate	Votes	%	±%
Conservative	Kit Malthouse	73,761	50.4	−1.7
Labour	Todd Foreman	44,630	30.5	+9.3
Green	Susanna Rustin	12,799	8.7	−1.4
Liberal Democrats	Layla Moran	10,035	6.9	−2.7
UKIP	Elizabeth Jones	5,161	3.5	+1.7
Majority		29,131	19.9	–11.0
Turnout		149,419	39.2	−9.3
Conservative hold		Swing	-5.5	

=== 2000s ===
2008 London Assembly election: West Central
Party	Candidate	Votes	%	±%
Conservative	Kit Malthouse	86,651	52.1	+7.4
Labour	Murad Qureshi	35,270	21.2	+2.3
Green	Julia Stephenson	16,874	10.1	+0.8
Liberal Democrats	Merlene Emerson	15,934	9.6	–5.5
UKIP	Paul Wiffen	3,060	1.8	–4.4
English Democrat	Alex Vaughan	1,858	1.1	New
Left List	Explo Nani-Kofi	1,630	1.0	New
Independent	Abby Dharamsey	962	0.6	New
Majority		51,381	30.9	+5.1
Turnout		166,379	48.5	+15.6
Conservative hold		Swing	+2.5	

2004 London Assembly election: West Central
Party	Candidate	Votes	%	±%
Conservative	Angie Bray	51,884	44.7	+0.5
Labour	Ansuya Sodha	21,940	18.9	–8.1
Liberal Democrats	Francesco Fruzza	17,478	15.1	+1.9
Green	Julia Stephenson	10,762	9.3	–2.2
UKIP	Damian Hockney	7,219	6.2	New
Respect	Kevin Cobham	4,825	4.1	New
CPA	Jillian McLachlan	1,993	1.7	New
Majority		29,944	25.8	+8.6
Turnout		116,101	32.9	+2.0
Conservative hold		Swing	+4.3	

2000 London Assembly election: West Central
Party	Candidate	Votes	%	±%
Conservative	Angie Bray	47,117	44.2	
Labour	Kate Green	28,838	27.0	
Liberal Democrats	Jon Burden	14,071	13.2	
Green	Julia Stephenson	12,254	11.5	
London Socialist	Christine Blower	2,720	2.6	
Homeless and Addicted	Stephen Smith	1,600	1.5	
Majority		18,279	17.2	
Turnout		106,600	30.9	
Conservative win (new seat)				

== Mayoral election results ==
Below are the results for the candidate which received the highest share of the popular vote in the constituency at each mayoral election.

Year	Party	Candidate
2000	Conservative	Steve Norris
2004	Conservative	Steve Norris
2008	Conservative	Boris Johnson
2012	Conservative	Boris Johnson
2016	Conservative	Zac Goldsmith
2021	Conservative	Shaun Bailey
2024	Labour	Sadiq Khan

2024 London mayoral election (West Central)
Party	Candidate	Votes	%	±%
Labour	Sadiq Khan	54,481	43.6	N/A
Conservative	Susan Hall	43,405	34.7	N/A
Liberal Democrats	Rob Blackie	7,663	6.13	N/A
Green	Zoë Garbett	5,984	4.79	N/A
Reform	Howard Cox	3,478	2.78	N/A
Independent	Natalie Campbell	2,552	2.04	N/A
SDP	Amy Gallagher	1,442	1.15	N/A
Animal Welfare	Femy Amin	1,386	1.11	N/A
Count Binface for Mayor of London	Count Binface	1,260	1.01	N/A
Independent	Tarun Ghulati	1,100	0.88	N/A
Britain First	Nick Scanlon	964	0.771	N/A
Independent	Andreas Michli	901	0.721	N/A
London Real	Brian Rose	350	0.28	N/A
Turnout		125,645	35%	−4.62%
Rejected ballots		679		
Registered electors		359,208		+1.71%

2021 London mayoral election (West Central)
Party	Candidate	1st round		2nd round			1st round votesTransfer votes, 2nd round
Party	Candidate	Total	Of round	Transfers	Total	Of round	1st round votesTransfer votes, 2nd round
Conservative	Shaun Bailey	53,713	38.5%				
Labour	Sadiq Khan	51,508	36.9%				
Green	Siân Berry	10,239	7.34%				
Liberal Democrats	Luisa Porritt	6,507	4.66%				
Reclaim	Laurence Fox	3,858	2.76%				
Independent	Niko Omilana	1,893	1.36%				
London Real	Brian Rose	1,813	1.3%				
Rejoin EU	Richard Hewison	1,811	1.3%				
Count Binface for Mayor of London	Count Binface	1,301	0.932%				
Let London Live	Piers Corbyn	1,299	0.931%				
Women's Equality	Mandu Reid	1,026	0.735%				
Animal Welfare	Vanessa Hudson	875	0.627%				
Heritage	David Kurten	662	0.474%				
Independent	Max Fosh	575	0.412%				
UKIP	Peter John Gammons	513	0.368%				
Independent	Farah London	504	0.361%				
Renew	Kam Balayev	427	0.306%				
SDP	Steve Kelleher	413	0.296%				
Independent	Nims Obunge	370	0.265%				
Burning Pink	Valerie Brown	247	0.177%				
Turnout		144,698	39.6%				
Registered electors		365,443					

2016 London mayoral election (West Central)
Party	Candidate	1st round		2nd round			1st round votesTransfer votes, 2nd round
Party	Candidate	Total	Of round	Transfers	Total	Of round	1st round votesTransfer votes, 2nd round
Conservative	Zac Goldsmith	70,490	46%				
Labour	Sadiq Khan	55,329	36.1%				
Green	Siân Berry	7,989	5.21%				
Liberal Democrats	Caroline Pidgeon	6,480	4.23%				
Women's Equality	Sophie Walker	3,583	2.34%				
UKIP	Peter Whittle	3,228	2.11%				
Respect	George Galloway	2,508	1.64%				
Cannabis is Safer than Alcohol	Lee Eli Harris	1,268	0.828%				
Britain First	Paul Golding	1,155	0.754%				
BNP	David Furness	515	0.336%				
Independent	Prince Zylinski	450	0.294%				
One Love	Ankit Love	221	0.144%				
Turnout		155,862	44.7%				
Registered electors		349,058					

2012 London mayoral election (West Central)
Party	Candidate	1st round		2nd round			1st round votesTransfer votes, 2nd round
Party	Candidate	Total	Of round	Transfers	Total	Of round	1st round votesTransfer votes, 2nd round
Conservative	Boris Johnson	87,449	59.4%				
Labour	Ken Livingstone	40,741	27.7%				
Green	Jenny Jones	5,855	3.97%				
Liberal Democrats	Brian Paddick	5,247	3.56%				
Independent	Siobhan Benita	5,126	3.48%				
UKIP	Lawrence Webb	1,838	1.25%				
BNP	Carlos Cortiglia	1,066	0.724%				
Turnout		149,768	39.3%				
Registered electors		381,101					

2008 London mayoral election (West Central)
Party	Candidate	1st round		2nd round			1st round votesTransfer votes, 2nd round
Party	Candidate	Total	Of round	Transfers	Total	Of round	1st round votesTransfer votes, 2nd round
Conservative	Boris Johnson	91,515	55.6%				
Labour	Ken Livingstone	47,705	29%				
Liberal Democrats	Brian Paddick	13,829	8.41%				
Green	Siân Berry	5,438	3.31%				
BNP	Richard Barnbrook	1,883	1.14%				
Christian Choice	Alan Craig	1,591	0.967%				
UKIP	Gerard Batten	912	0.555%				
Left List	Lindsey German	900	0.547%				
English Democrat	Matt O'Connor	426	0.259%				
Independent	Winston McKenzie	260	0.158%				
Turnout		166,895	48.6%				
Registered electors		343,182					

2004 London mayoral election (West Central)
Party	Candidate	1st round		2nd round			1st round votesTransfer votes, 2nd round
Party	Candidate	Total	Of round	Transfers	Total	Of round	1st round votesTransfer votes, 2nd round
Conservative	Steve Norris	50,242	41.5%				
Labour	Ken Livingstone	38,678	31.9%				
Liberal Democrats	Simon Hughes	16,204	13.4%				
UKIP	Frank Maloney	4,202	3.47%				
Green	Darren Johnson	4,020	3.32%				
Respect	Lindsey German	3,240	2.67%				
BNP	Julian Leppert	1,931	1.59%				
CPA	Ram Gidoomal	1,898	1.57%				
Independent Working Class Action	Lorna Reid	461	0.38%				
Independent	Tammy Nagalingam	300	0.248%				
Turnout		124,515	35.3%				
Registered electors		352,687					

2000 London mayoral election (West Central)
Party	Candidate	1st round		2nd round			1st round votesTransfer votes, 2nd round
Party	Candidate	Total	Of round	Transfers	Total	Of round	1st round votesTransfer votes, 2nd round
Conservative	Steve Norris	44,954	38.8%				
Independent	Ken Livingstone	40,176	34.7%				
Liberal Democrats	Susan Kramer	11,609	10%				
Labour	Frank Dobson	11,070	9.56%				
Green	Darren Johnson	2,680	2.31%				
CPA	Ram Gidoomal	2,229	1.92%				
BNP	Michael Newland	999	0.863%				
UKIP	Damian Hockney	850	0.734%				
Pro-Motorist Small Shop	Geoffrey Ben-Nathan	495	0.427%				
Natural Law	Geoffrey Clements	396	0.342%				
Independent	Ashwin Kumar	337	0.291%				
Turnout		118,191	34.2%				
Registered electors		345,174					
