= London and Partners =

Business Growth and Destination Agency in London, England

London & Partners
- Abbreviation: L&P
- Formation: 1 April 2011
- Founder: Mayor of London
- Location: United Kingdom
- Region served: London
- Official language: English
- Board Chairman: Howard Dawber
- Chief Executive Officer: Laura Citron
- Parent organisation: Greater London Authority
- Subsidiaries: Visit London
- Budget: £12,000,000
- Website: www.londonandpartners.com }

London & Partners (L&P) is a promotion agency of the Greater London Authority.

== History ==
It was set up by the mayor of London, Boris Johnson, on 1 April 2011. London and Partners replaced Visit London, Think London and Study London, which had been three separate bodies promoting London to tourists, businesses for inward investment, and international students respectively. London and Partners also inherited staff from overseas offices of the GLA.

== Governance ==
London and Partners is a not-for-profit private company limited by guarantee. The board chairman is Howard Dawber. The chief executive officer is Laura Citron.

== Campaigns ==
L&P has taken representatives of businesses on the trade missions of thee Mayor of London.

As of 2026, L&P has a budget of approximately £7,000,000.
