= Angie Bray, Baroness Bray of Coln =

British politician and life peer (born 1953)

The Right Honourable The Baroness Bray of Coln
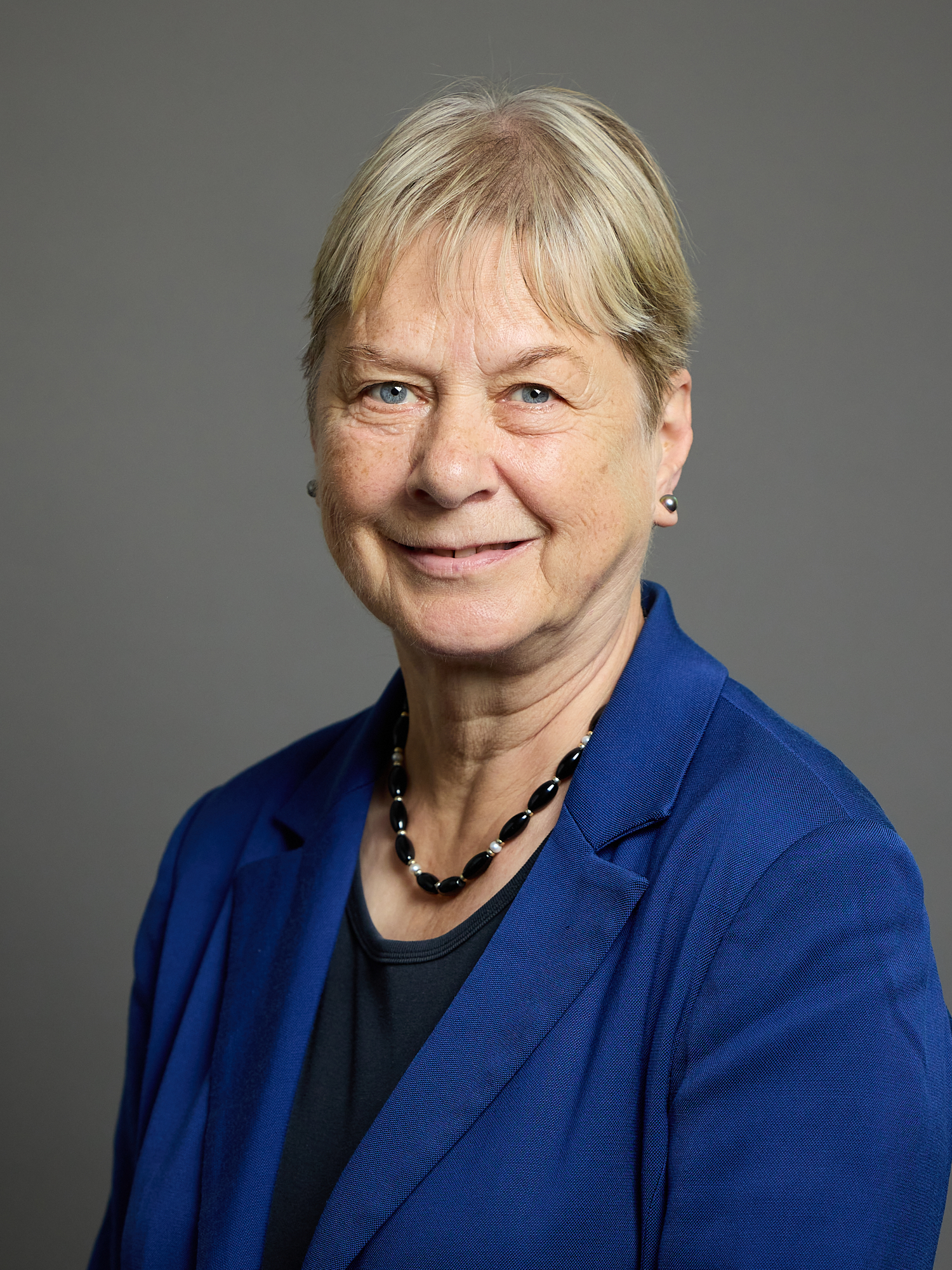
- Official portrait, 2025

Member of the House of Lords
- Lord Temporal
- Life peerage 8 November 2022

Member of Parliament for Ealing Central and Acton
- In office 6 May 2010 – 30 March 2015
- Preceded by: Constituency Created
- Succeeded by: Rupa Huq

Leader of the Conservative Party in the London Assembly
- In office 2006–2007
- Preceded by: Bob Neill
- Succeeded by: Richard Barnes

Member of the London Assembly for West Central
- In office 4 May 2000 – 1 May 2008
- Preceded by: Constituency Created
- Succeeded by: Kit Malthouse

Personal details
- Born: 13 October 1953 (age 72) Croydon, Surrey, England
- Party: Conservative
- Education: University of St Andrews

Angela Lavinia Bray, Baroness Bray of Coln (born 13 October 1953) is a British Conservative Party politician who was the Member of the London Assembly for West Central from 2000 to 2008, and Member of Parliament (MP) for Ealing Central and Acton from 2010 to 2015.

== Early life and career ==
Bray was born in Croydon to Benedict Eustace Charles Tevery Bray and Patricia Measures who were residents of the Isle of Man. She was privately educated at Downe House School, Thatcham, and later attended the University of St Andrews, where she studied medieval history.

In 1979, she joined the British Forces Broadcasting Service in Gibraltar; a year later she joined LBC Radio as a presenter, producer and reporter.

== Political career ==
She was employed as head of broadcasting at Conservative Central Office from 1989. She was a press officer for John Major's 1990 leadership campaign. During the 1992 general election campaign she served as press secretary to Chris Patten, the Chairman of the Conservative Party. She assisted the party's press office again in the 2005 election campaign, after which she worked as a public affairs consultant.

Bray unsuccessfully contested East Ham at the 1997 general election, finishing second behind Stephen Timms. She was a member of the London Assembly for West Central London from 2000 until she stood down in 2008, acting as Conservative leader in the Assembly from 2006.

She was placed on the 'A-List' of Conservative Party candidates for the 2010 general election. She was elected in the constituency of Ealing Central and Acton defeating Labour candidate Bassam Mahfouz with a majority of 3,716 votes. She made her maiden speech in the House of Commons on 27 May 2010 during a debate on Energy and Environment, Food and Rural Affairs.

Following Bray's election to Parliament, she was appointed Parliamentary private secretary to the Cabinet Office Minister, Francis Maude. She was sacked as Parliamentary Private Secretary in July 2012, after she voted against a coalition government Bill on reforming the House of Lords.

She lost her seat in the 2015 general election.

=== House of Lords ===
It was announced on 14 October 2022, that as part of Boris Johnson's 2022 Political Honours, Bray would be appointed a life peer. On 8 November 2022, she was created Baroness Bray of Coln, of Coln Saint Aldwyns in the County of Gloucestershire. She made her maiden speech in the house of Lords on 6 February 2023 during the debate on the Retained EU Law (Revocation and Reform) Bill.

Parliament of the United Kingdom
New constituency	Member of Parliament for Ealing Central and Acton; 2010–2015	Succeeded by Rupa Huq
