= Roger Greenhalgh =

British surgeon (1941–2023)

Professor Roger Malcolm Greenhalgh MD, MChir, FRCS, FACS (Hon.)
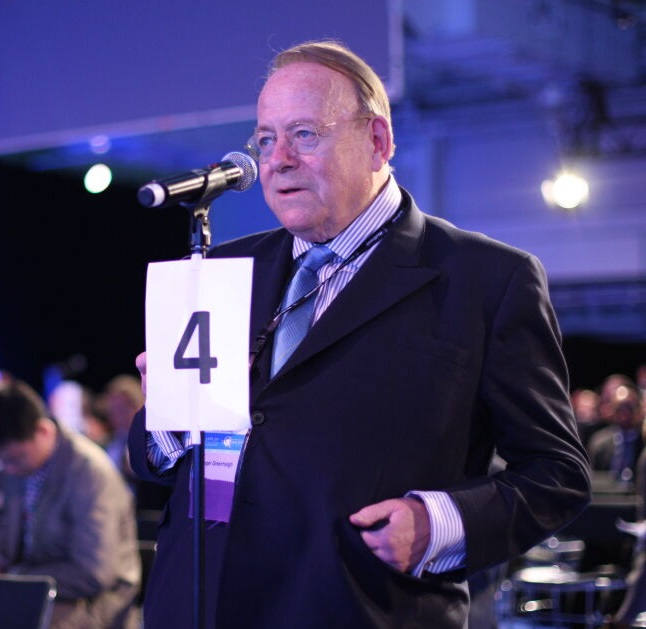
- Born: 6 February 1941; Ilkeston, Derbyshire, England
- Died: 6 October 2023 (aged 82); London, England
- Education: Ilkeston Grammar School; Clare College, Cambridge
- Medical career
- Profession: Surgeon
- Field: Vascular surgery, endovascular surgery
- Institutions: St. Thomas' Hospital, Hammersmith Hospital, St. Bartholomew's Hospital, Charing Cross Hospital
- Research: Peripheral arterial disease, abdominal aortic aneurysms, endovascular aneurysm repair, carotid artery stenosis, venous disease
- Awards: Society for Vascular Surgery International Lifetime Achievement Award (2018): First European Honorary Member of the European Society for Vascular Surgery (1993); Honorary Life President of the European Board of Vascular Surgery

Roger Malcolm Greenhalgh FRCS (6 February 1941 – 6 October 2023) was a British surgeon, researcher and educator best known for his contributions to the field of vascular surgery. He was emeritus Professor of Surgery at Imperial College London in London, England and Head of the Imperial College Vascular Surgery Research Group at the time of his death.

Greenhalgh was also the founder and chair of the Charing Cross Symposium between 1978 and 2023, and the founder and chairman of the editorial board for the European Journal of Vascular and Endovascular Surgery (EJVES) from 1987 to 2003. He played a significant role in the formation of the European Society for Vascular Surgery, and is credited with being an early adopter of the concept of large-scale, randomised clinical trials, helping to establish them as a means for evaluating surgical techniques.

== Early life and education ==
Roger M. Greenhalgh was born in Ilkeston, Derbyshire, in the East Midlands of England on February 6, 1941 to (Major) John Greenhalgh and Phyllis Poynton. At the time of his birth, Greenhalgh's father was working in the police force in Derbyshire before being recruited to military service in India early on in the Second World War.

After attending Holy Trinity Infant School and Granby Junior School in Ilkeston, Greenhalgh attended Ilkeston Grammar School, a state secondary school to which entry was dependent on gaining a scholarship through an 11-plus examination. Having originally intended to train as an engineer, he followed the advice of his headmaster, who suggested he should consider medicine as a career.

== Medical school and postgraduate training ==
Greenhalgh was the first in his family to attend university, enrolling at Clare College, Cambridge, in 1960. Within a term of Greenhalgh arriving at Clare College, his medical tutor Gordon Wright predicted that Greenhalgh would go on to become a surgeon. Greenhalgh graduated from the University of Cambridge in 1963, before going on to achieve Doctor of Medicine (MD) and Master of Surgery (MChir) degrees, qualifying as an honorary doctor in December 1966.

Greenhalgh began his postgraduate career at St Thomas' Hospital in London, becoming house surgeon and then senior house officer between 1967 and 1969. He went on to gain additional experience working at St Mary's Hospital in Colchester, England until 1972, at which point Gerard Taylor requested that he should join St Bartholomew's Hospital in London. Greenhalgh trained as a senior registrar and lecturer at St Bartholomew's Hospital from 1972 to 1976, and won the prestigious Moynihan Fellowship of the Association of Surgeons of Great Britain and Ireland during this time, in 1974, using the £1,000 award he received to visit a number of vascular centres around the world.

== Career in surgery ==
Greenhalgh was appointed surgeon at Charing Cross Hospital in London in September 1976, three years after the hospital's new site on Fulham Palace Road had been opened by Queen Elizabeth II. Between 1976 and 1981, Greenhalgh was an honorary consultant and senior lecturer in surgery at Charing Cross Hospital's Medical School. In October 1981, when he was 40 years old, Greenhalgh was made Professor of Surgery at Charing Cross Hospital, ultimately succeeding Professor Harding Rains, the hospital's first Chair of Surgery, and working as Head of Department up to 1984.

From 1984, a merger between the medical schools of Charing Cross Hospital and Westminster Hospital in London, leading to the establishment of the Charing Cross and Westminster Medical School. As Dean and Principal of this new entity from 1993 to 1997, Greenhalgh later oversaw a successful merger with Imperial College London. He also remained as Professor and Chair of Surgery at Charing Cross Hospital up to 2006, at which point he became Emeritus Professor of Surgery at Imperial College London - a title he held until his death in 2023. In addition, Greenhalgh was Senior Research Fellow in the Department of Surgery and Cancer during his time at Imperial College London.

Greenhalgh’s skill as a clinician led to the White House selecting him as the surgeon who would operate on President George H. W. Bush, if needed, during his visit to London in 1991. In 2018, Janet Powell, one of his closest research collaborators from Imperial College London, said of Greenhalgh that "medical students and junior doctors have queued for the opportunity to work in his team".

Greenhalgh cited Peter Martin and James Calnan, two surgeons he worked with at Hammersmith Hospital in the late 1960s, as key influences in his decision to pursue a career in vascular surgery, and in his initial interest in clinical research. He also learned from and was influenced by vascular surgery pioneers including Frank Cockett, Gerard Taylor, Michael DeBakey, Edward Diethrich, Denton Cooley, and Jesse Thompson.

== Research contributions ==
Greenhalgh’s research endeavours began with an interest in hyperlipidaemia when he was a resident. This saw him assess the role played by serum lipids and lipoproteins in peripheral artery disease (PAD) as lead author of a 1971 publication in The Lancet. Greenhalgh went on to make a number of research contributions on the causes and management of aneurysmal arterial disease, including as a leading investigator for the UK Small Aneurysm Trial (UKSAT), which was the first trial to establish a size-based threshold for the open surgical repair of abdominal aortic aneurysms (AAAs) and has been supported by multiple subsequent clinical studies.

Greenhalgh was also principal investigator for the endovascular aneurysm repair (EVAR) randomised controlled trials, EVAR 1 and 2, which enrolled hundreds of patients from hospital across the United Kingdom and sought to establish the role of EVAR - a minimally invasive alternative to open surgery - in the treatment of AAAs. The most recent update from EVAR 1, which was published in The Lancet in 2016 and analysed 15-year clinical follow-up data from more than 1,200 patients, saw Greenhalgh and his fellow investigators conclude that "EVAR has an early survival benefit but an inferior late survival compared with open repair, which needs to be addressed by lifelong surveillance of EVAR and re-intervention if necessary".

Other notable trials for which Greenhalgh was a leading investigator include the Mild to Moderate Intermittent Claudication (MIMIC), Vein Graft Surveillance (VGST) and Immediate Management of the Patient With Rupture: Open Versus Endovascular Repair (IMPROVE) trials. He also spent much of his career researching the effect of tobacco smoke on the management and treatment of arterial disease. Greenhalgh has co-published more than 300 original papers spanning several areas within vascular surgery, including venous, carotid, peripheral and aortic diseases.

== Charing Cross Symposium ==
In 1978, during the early days of his time at Charing Cross Hospital, Greenhalgh founded and created the Charing Cross (CX) Symposium - a small, annual medical forum focusing predominantly on research and education in vascular surgery that drew roughly 100 delegates at the time of its inception. Chaired by Greenhalgh until his death in 2023, the CX Symposium has become one of the largest and longest-running vascular surgery conferences in the world. Recent iterations of the CX Symposium have encompassed discussions on both open and minimally invasive vascular surgery, as well as topics including aortic surgeries, peripheral arterial and venous diseases, and acute stroke treatments.

The CX Symposium was held at the Charing Cross Hospital itself for 20 years before moving to Imperial College London in 1999. To accommodate growing interest, the symposium would later move to the Olympia London event space in West Kensington, first to the Olympia National in 2013 and then the Olympia Grand in 2014. In the years prior to the COVID-19 pandemic, over 4,000 in-person delegates attended the symposium from more than 80 different countries. After temporarily switching to a solely digital and then hybrid format due to the pandemic, the 46th edition of the CX Symposium is set to move to the Exhibition Centre London in East London in 2024.

== European Society for Vascular Surgery ==
Citing the successful format of the Society for Vascular Surgery (SVS) in the United States, including the Journal of Vascular Surgery and national Vascular Annual Meeting that it sponsored, Greenhalgh convened the first ever meeting of the European Society for Vascular Surgery (ESVS) in April of 1987, alongside that year's CX Symposium. The European Journal of Vascular Surgery was also launched in February 1987, with Greenhalgh as Chairman of the Editorial Board for the publication. His final act in this role was to bring about changing its name to the European Journal of Vascular and Endovascular Surgery in 1993, owing to the growth of minimally invasive techniques in vascular surgery at the time.

== Selected honours and awards ==
Greenhalgh was made the first European Honorary Member of the society in 1993, and received an award in recognition of his role in the foundation of the ESVS in 2002. He was President of Surgery for the European Union of Medical Specialists from 1998 to 2002, and then President for the European Board of Vascular Surgery from 2002 to 2006. He was later also made Honorary Life President of the European Board of Vascular Surgery. Greenhalgh served as President "for the millennium" of the Vascular Surgical Society of Great Britain and Ireland from 1999 to 2000. He was also President of the European Federation of Surgical Specialties between 2004 and 2008.

In 2018, Greenhalgh became the first recipient of the International Lifetime Achievement Award from the SVS, accepting the award at the SVS' Vascular Annual Meeting in Boston, Massachusetts. Greenhalgh received multiple honorary fellowships in his lifetime, including from the Royal College of Surgeons of Edinburgh in 1999, the British Society of Interventional Radiology in 2005, the Royal College of Surgeons in Ireland in 2007, and the American College of Surgeons in 2018. He was also made an honorary member of a number of vascular surgical societies around the world including the United States, Canada, Brazil, Germany, Austria, Switzerland and Poland.

== Personal life ==
At the age of 16, Greenhalgh met his future wife, Karin Maria Gross, the daughter of a family colleague from Austria. Greenhalgh and Gross married in Vienna in the summer of 1964 before moving back to England, where they lived together for several decades prior to Gross' death from COVID-19 in 2020. Greenhalgh and Gross had two children, Stephen John Greenhalgh and Christina Elizabeth Greenhalgh.

Greenhalgh's role as founder and chair of the CX Symposium inspired his son Stephen to set up and launch BIBA Medical, a specialised medical news and events company, in 1994. BIBA Medical assumed the running of the CX Symposium in the late 1990s. Roger M. Greenhalgh was the company director for BIBA Medical for more than 25 years, and editor-in-chief of its longest-running publication, Vascular News, between 1999 and 2023. Greenhalgh also published his autobiography, Born to be a Surgeon, in 2011.

Greenhalgh was a keen rower during his time at the University of Cambridge, and a supporter of the Imperial College Boat Club. He also enjoyed skiing and tennis. Greenhalgh was often cited as being a Europhile, and regularly advocated international collaboration.

Greenhalgh died in London on October 6, 2023, at the age of 82. At the time of his death, he was emeritus Professor of Surgery at Imperial College London, director of BIBA Medical and chair of the CX Symposium.
