= Institutional sexism in the Metropolitan Police =

Institutional sexism in the Metropolitan Police of Greater London has been reported since female officers first joined in 1919, with particular attention given to the issue since 2021.

== 2021-present ==
In 2021, the Metropolitan Police Service attracted media coverage for approaches to policing in high-profile cases such as the murder of Sarah Everard, the murders of Nicole Smallman and Bibaa Henry and the handling of internal sexual assault allegations. Women's rights groups have called for an enquiry into misogyny in the force.

In March 2021, Wayne Couzens, a serving Metropolitan Police officer with the Parliamentary and Diplomatic Protection unit, was arrested and later charged with the kidnap and murder of Sarah Everard. Couzens was later sentenced to life without the possibility of release. There were renewed calls for high level resignations following public outcry over the Met's response to the Everard case. In March 2022, two serving Met police constables and one ex-officer were charged with sharing offensive messages with Wayne Couzens.

At the beginning of February 2022, the Independent Office for Police Conduct (IOPC) reported on the conduct of officers at the Charing Cross police station. Their investigation found evidence of highly sexualized, violent and discriminatory messages sent as part of WhatsApp group involving 17 officers. The regional director of the IOPC, Sal Naseem, said: "The behaviour we uncovered was disgraceful and fell well below the standards expected of the officers involved. While these officers predominantly worked in teams in Westminster, which have since been disbanded, we know from other recent cases that these issues are not isolated or historic."

On 17 January 2023, David Carrick, a Met Police Parliamentary and Diplomatic Protection officer, was dismissed from the Metropolitan Police after pleading guilty to 49 offences, including numerous cases of rape. He had been the subject of allegations of abuse of women over a period of twenty years. The Home Secretary, Suella Braverman, announced that there would be an internal review of the Met's dismissal processes, and Mark Rowley said that the histories and records of all officers and staff would be rechecked to see whether any previous offending had been missed. In July 2023 it was announced that six of Carrick’s victims are intending to sue the Metropolitan Police for breaching their human rights by failing to investigate properly. On 20 July 2023 the Independent Office for Police Conduct announced that it was starting four investigations into the way the Metropolitan Police had handled complaints against Carrick.

In November 2024, it was found that the Metropolitan Police were told about allegations of sexual assault against Mohamed Al-Fayed, the late businessman and owner of Harrods, ten years earlier than it had acknowledged. The Met had claimed that it first received such allegations in 2005. However, in 1995, the Met had received such allegations from Samantha Ramsay, who is now deceased. The BBC reported that "Samantha’s family say the Met dismissed her claims. They believe that multiple women could have been saved from sexual abuse if the force had acted." The Met claimed that there was no history of Samantha's allegations on their computer system, "but that in 1995 some reports were paper-based and might not have been transferred." Ramsay's sister, Emma, recalled the police as having said at the time: “We’ve added it to a pile of other female names that we’ve got that have made the same complaint against Mohamed Al Fayed.” On 8 November, the Independent Office for Police Conduct announced that they would be investigating the Met over their handling of allegations of sexual misconduct related to the case.
