= Tony Devenish =

British politician

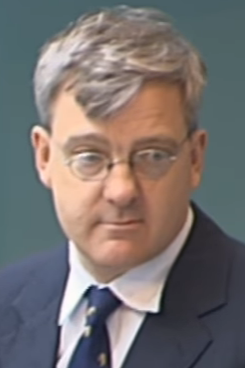
- Devenish in 2017

Member of the London Assembly for West Central
- In office 6 May 2016 – 6 May 2024
- Preceded by: Kit Malthouse
- Succeeded by: James Small-Edwards

Member of Westminster City Council for Knightsbridge and Belgravia
- Incumbent
- Assumed office May 2006

Personal details
- Born: Anthony Stuart Devenish; 31 March 1968 (age 58) London, England, UK
- Party: Conservative

Anthony Stuart Devenish (born 31 March 1968) is a British politician who served as the member of the London Assembly for West Central between 2016 and 2024. A member of the Conservative Party, he is also a councillor on Westminster City Council, representing the Knightsbridge and Belgravia ward. Devenish is a member of the Conservative Friends of Israel group.

== Early life and career ==
Devenish was born in London in 1968. Graduated from Coventry Polytechnic with BA (Hons) Degree in Modern Studies, former member of the Federation of Conservative Students. Prior to his political career, he worked in infrastructure and property, with roles at Rolls-Royce from 1990 to 1997 (where he was one of the youngest overseas managers for the company), Kvaerner (1998–99) and Thames Water (1999–2004). He latterly worked for Veolia (2004–12).

== Political career ==
Devenish was first elected to Westminster City Council in 2006, being re-elected in 2010, 2014, 2018 and 2022. He represents a ward centred on the affluent areas of Knightsbridge and Belgravia, which can be considered a safe seat for his party, the Conservatives.

He stood as the Conservative candidate in Houghton and Washington East, a safe seat for the Labour Party, at both the 2001 and 2005 general elections. Devenish came second in 2001, and third in 2005.

He was elected to the London Assembly for West Central at the 2016 elections, and re-elected at the 2021 elections, which were delayed by a year owing to the COVID-19 pandemic. In 2022, he was a member of the Assembly's Environment, Housing and Police and Crime Committees.

== Personal life ==
Devenish lists his recreations as "travel", noting that he "previously lived and worked in [the] Gulf and Far East" from 1990 to 1999.
