= Metropolitan Police =

Territorial police force of Greater London

Metropolitan Police Service
- Logo

- Badge of the Metropolitan Police

- Flag of the Metropolitan Police
- Common name: The Met
- Abbreviation: MPS

Agency overview
- Formed: September 29, 1829 (197 years ago)
- Preceding agencies: Bow Street Runners; Thames River Police
- Employees: 43,571 in total 32,493 police officers 9,816 police staff 1,262 PCSOs
- Volunteers: 1,858 special constables 1,500 police support volunteers 3,658 volunteer police cadets
- Annual budget: £4.43 billion

Jurisdictional structure
- Operations jurisdiction: Greater London (excluding the City of London)
- Map of the Metropolitan Police District
- Area: 1,578 km^{2} (609 sq mi)
- Population: 8.95 million (2019/20)
- Legal jurisdiction: England and Wales (throughout the whole of the United Kingdom, including Scotland and Northern Ireland, under certain limited circumstances)
- Primary governing body: Mayor's Office for Policing and Crime
- Secondary governing body: Home Office
- Constituting instruments: Metropolitan Police Act 1829; Metropolitan Police Act 1839; Police Act 1996
- General nature: Local civilian police

Operational structure
- Overseen by: His Majesty's Inspectorate of Constabulary and Fire & Rescue Services; Independent Office for Police Conduct
- Headquarters: New Scotland Yard, Westminster, London, England
- Police officers: 32,493 full time 1,858 special constables
- PCSOs: 1,262
- Deputy Mayor for Policing and Crime responsible: Kaya Comer-Schwartz
- Agency executives: Sir Mark Rowley, Commissioner of Police of the Metropolis; Matt Jukes, Deputy Commissioner of Police of the Metropolis

Website
- www.met.police.uk

The Metropolitan Police Service (MPS), commonly known as the Metropolitan Police, Met Police, or the "Met", is the territorial police force responsible for law enforcement and crime prevention within Greater London. In addition, it is responsible for specialised tasks throughout the United Kingdom, such as dealing with counter-terrorism throughout the UK, and the protection of certain individuals, including the monarch, royal family, governmental officials, and other designated figures. It is also referred to metonymously as "Scotland Yard" or "the Yard", after the location of its original headquarters in Great Scotland Yard, Whitehall, in the 19th century. The Met is presently headquartered at New Scotland Yard, in a building situated on the Victoria Embankment.

The main geographical area covered by the Met, the Metropolitan Police District, consists of the 32 London boroughs, and excludes the square mile of the City of London – a largely non-residential and financial district, policed by the separate City of London Police. As the force responsible for the majority of the UK's capital, the Met has significant responsibilities and unique challenges compared with other UK police forces, such as protecting 164 foreign embassies and High Commissions, policing London City and Heathrow airports, protecting the Palace of Westminster, and managing a higher volume of protests and events than any other British police force, with 3,500 such events in 2016. The Met cooperates closely with the British Transport Police who provide policing to London's rail network, the London Underground, and the London cable car.

The Met, by officer numbers, ranks as the largest police force within the United Kingdom. Excluding its national roles, the Met oversees the eighth-smallest primary geographic area (police area) compared to other territorial police forces in the UK.

The force operates under the leadership of the Commissioner of Police of the Metropolis, directly accountable to the mayor of London, through the Mayor's Office for Policing and Crime and the Home Office. The post of commissioner was first held jointly by Sir Charles Rowan and Sir Richard Mayne, with Sir Mark Rowley currently holding the position since July 2022.

== History ==
The Metropolitan Police Service was founded in 1829 by Home Secretary Sir Robert Peel under the Metropolitan Police Act 1829 and on 29 September of that year, the first constables of the service appeared on the streets of London. Ten years later, Metropolitan Police Act 1839 consolidated policing within London by expanding the Metropolitan Police District and either abolishing or amalgamating the various other law enforcement entities within London into the Metropolitan Police such as the Thames River Police and the Bow Street Runners.

== Governance ==
Since January 2012, the Mayor of London is responsible for the governance of the Metropolitan Police through the Mayor's Office for Policing and Crime (MOPAC). The mayor is able to appoint someone to act on his behalf. As of November 2024, the office-holder is the deputy mayor for policing and crime, Kaya Comer-Schwartz. The work of MOPAC is scrutinised by the Police and Crime Committee (also known as a police and crime panel) of the London Assembly. These structures were created by the Police Reform and Social Responsibility Act 2011 and replaced the Metropolitan Police Authority-appointed board created in 2000 by Greater London Authority Act 1999.

Before 2000, the Metropolitan Police was under the authority of the Home Secretary, the only British territorial police force to be administered by central government. The Metropolitan Police Office (MPO), although based at Scotland Yard, was a department of the Home Office created in 1829 and was responsible for the force's day-to-day administration. Under the authority of the receiver, a civilian official who was equivalent in rank to the deputy commissioner and served as the force's chief financial officer, it was headed by a civilian secretary, who was equivalent in rank to the assistant commissioners.

== Police area and other forces ==
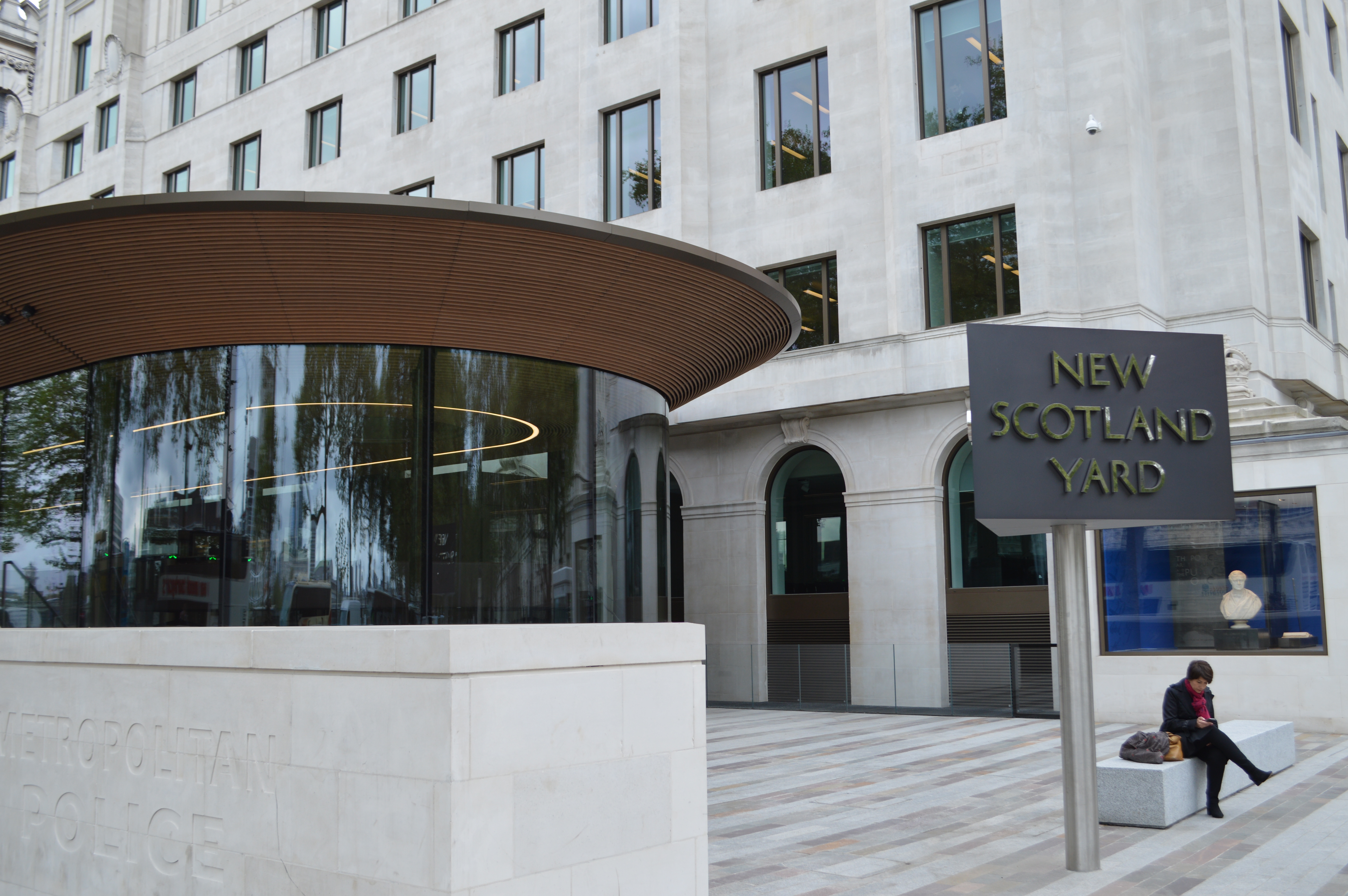
New Scotland Yard is the headquarters of the Metropolitan Police.

The area policed by the Metropolitan Police Service is known as the Metropolitan Police District (MPD). Since 2000, the MPD's boundaries have been identical to those of Greater London, covering the 32 London boroughs; the City of London (which is not a London borough) is a separate police area and is the responsibility of the City of London Police. Until 2017, the Met was organized into 32 Borough Operational Command Units directly aligned with the 32 boroughs; the MPD is now divided into 12 Basic Command Units (BCUs) made up of two, three or four boroughs.

The Ministry of Defence Police is responsible for policing of Ministry of Defence property throughout the United Kingdom, including its headquarters in Whitehall and other MoD establishments across the MPD.

The British Transport Police (BTP) is responsible for policing of the rail network in Great Britain, including London. Within London, it is also responsible for the policing of the London Underground, London Trams, the London Cable Car and the Docklands Light Railway.

The English part of the Royal Parks Constabulary, which patrolled a number of Greater London's major parks, was merged with the Metropolitan Police in 2004, and those parks are now policed by the Royal Parks Operational Command Unit. There is also a small park police force, the Kew Constabulary, responsible for the Royal Botanic Gardens, whose officers have full police powers within the park. A few local authorities maintain their own borough park constabularies, including Wandsworth Parks and Events Police, Kensington and Chelsea Parks Police, Havering Parks Constabulary and the Hampstead Heath Constabulary. All of these enjoy powers of arrest without warrant as constables; however, the officers of the last mentioned have full police powers, much like officers of the Metropolitan Police, on the heath, whereas the other parks' police primarily focus on by-law enforcement.

Metropolitan Police officers have legal jurisdiction throughout all of England and Wales, including areas that have their own special police forces, such as the Ministry of Defence, as do all police officers of territorial police forces. Officers also have limited powers in Scotland and Northern Ireland. Within the MPD, the Met will take over the investigation of any serious crime from the Ministry of Defence Police and to a lesser degree BTP, if it is deemed appropriate. Terrorist incidents and complex murder enquiries will almost always be investigated by the Met, with the assistance of any relevant specialist force, even if they are committed on Ministry of Defence or railway property. A minor incursion into the normal jurisdiction of territorial police officers in England and Wales is that Met officers involved in the protection duties of the Royal Family and other VIPs have full police powers in Scotland and Northern Ireland in connection with those duties.

== Organisation and structure ==
The Metropolitan Police Service is organised into the following directorates:

- Frontline Policing
- Met Operations
- Specialist Operations
- Professionalism
- Shared Support Services (part of Met headquarters)

Each is overseen by an assistant commissioner or, in the case of administrative departments, a director of police staff, which is the equivalent civilian staff grade. The management board is made up of the commissioner, deputy commissioner, assistant commissioners and directors.

== Ranks ==
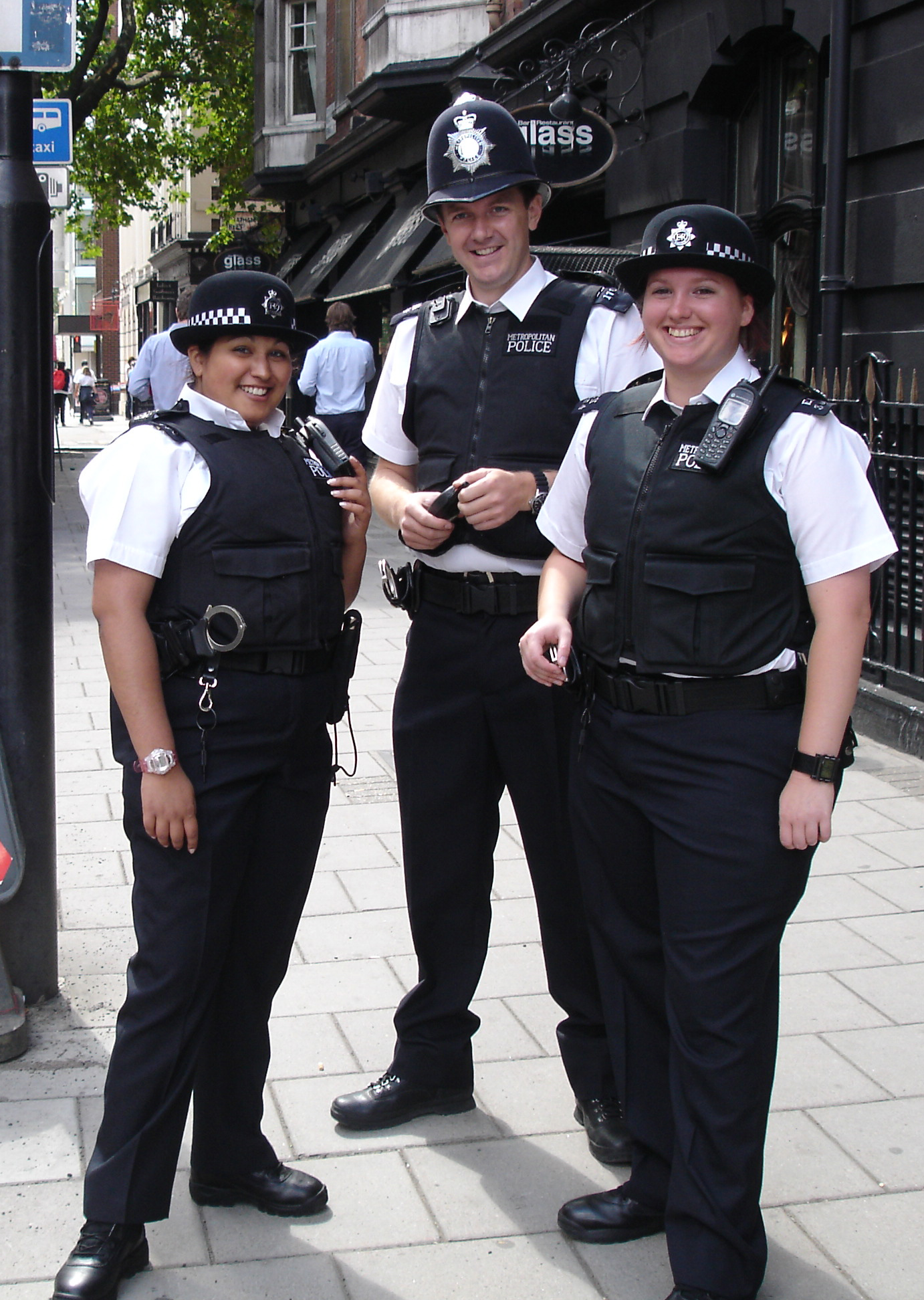
Met Police officers on the streets of Soho. Since 1863, the custodian helmet (middle) has been worn by male police constables and sergeants while on foot patrol.

The Metropolitan Police Service uses the standard British police ranks, indicated by epaulettes, up to chief superintendent, but uniquely has five ranks above that level instead of the standard three: commander, deputy assistant commissioner, assistant commissioner, deputy commissioner and commissioner. All senior officers of the rank of Commander and above are chief police officers of NPCC (previously ACPO) rank.

The Met approved the use of name badges in October 2003, with new recruits wearing the Velcro badges from September 2004. The badge consists of the wearer's rank, followed by their surname. All officers are assigned a unique identification number, which includes a two-letter BCU (Basic Command Unit) code.

Following controversy over assaults by uniformed officers with concealed shoulder identification numbers during the G20 summit, Commissioner Sir Paul Stephenson said, "the public has a right to be able to identify any uniformed officer whilst performing their duty" by their shoulder identification numbers.

=== Insignia ===
The Met uniformed officer rank structure, with epaulette design, is as follows (from highest to lowest):

Metropolitan Police Service ranks and insignia
Rank	Commissioner	Deputy commissioner	Assistant commissioner	Deputy assistant commissioner	Commander	Chief superintendent	Superintendent	Chief inspector	Inspector	Sergeant	Constable
Epaulette insignia											

The Met also has several active Volunteer Police Cadet units, which maintain their own internal rank structure. The Metropolitan Special Constabulary is a contingent of part-time volunteer police officers and is attached to most Borough Operational Command Units. The Metropolitan Special Constabulary Ranks are as follows (from lowest to highest):

Metropolitan Police Service Special Constabulary ranks and insignia
Rank	Chief officer	Assistant chief officer	Special chief inspector	Special inspector	Special sergeant	Special constable
Epaulette Insignia						
Notes:	Some of these ranks and epaulettes are not the same as other Special Constabulary ranks and insignia and only apply to the Metropolitan Police.; Reference					

The prefix "woman" in front of female officers' ranks has been obsolete since 1999. Members of the Criminal Investigation Department (CID) up to and including the rank of chief superintendent prefix their ranks with "detective". Detective ranks are equivalent in rank to their uniform counterparts. Other departments, such as Special Branch and Child Protection, award non-detectives "branch detective" status, allowing them to use the "Detective" prefix. None of these detective ranks confer on the holder any extra pay or supervisory authority compared to their uniformed colleagues.

=== Workforce ===
The following is the current released workforce data for the ranks. The chief officers rank covers all senior ranks as well as special constables covering all special constable ranks.

Metropolitan Police Service workforce
Rank	Police staff	Police support volunteer	Designated Officer	PCSO	Special constable	Constable	Sergeant	Inspector	Chief inspector	Superintendent	Chief superintendent	Chief officer
Female personnel	5285	468	340	478	530	7465	956	270	68	44	12	8
Male personnel	3626	257	390	829	1330	17329	3526	935	232	147	45	26
Total personnel	8911	725	730	1307	1860	24794	4482	1205	300	191	57	34
Reference	2019 Police workforce open data tables											

== Arms ==
Coat of arms of Metropolitan Police
Crest On a wreath Argent and Azure, three arrows, one in pale and two in saltire, barbs downward, Proper, banded Azure and ensigned by the Royal Crown proper. Escutcheon Azure, a portcullis chained within a double tressure flory counterflory Argent. Supporters On either side a lion rampant guardant Argent, gorged with a collar Azure charged alternately with bezants and bees volant, grasping in the interior paw a column Or.

Badge A roundel azure, thereon the Royal Cypher of His Majesty King Charles the Third argent within a circlet azure fimbriated and inscribed with words 'Metropolitan Police' in letters argent, the whole upon a star of eight major and fifty-six lesser points argent, ensigned by the Royal Crown proper.

== Police officers ==
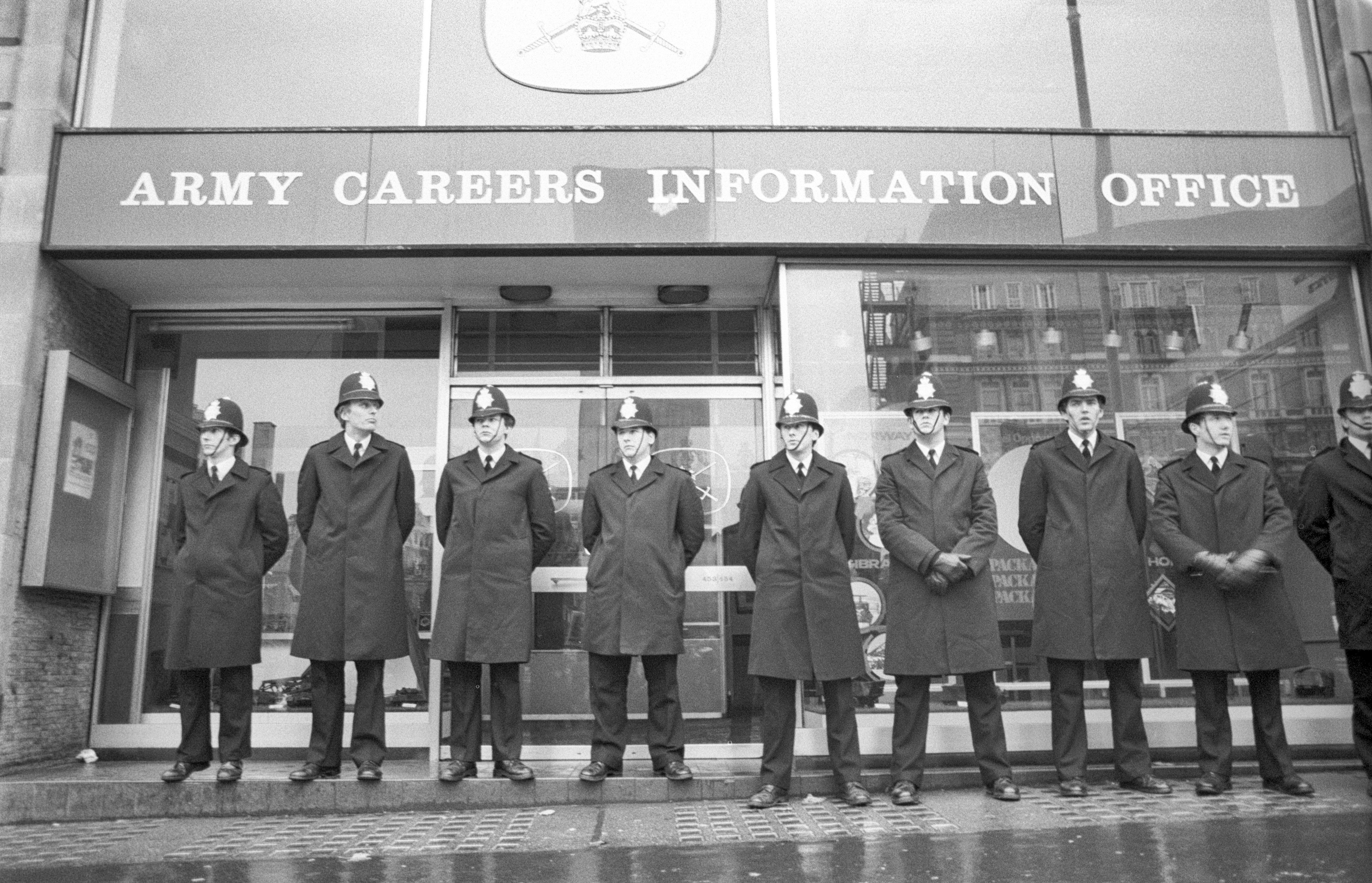
Metropolitan Police officers, 1979

Officers wearing modern uniform with custodian helmet, 2010

The Metropolitan Police Service includes full-time, paid officers known as 'regulars', and part-time, voluntary officers from the Metropolitan Special Constabulary, known as 'specials'. Both regulars and specials enjoy full police powers, wear the same uniform, and carry the same kit. As elsewhere in the UK, "regulars" are not employees, but rather Crown servants, and holders of the office of constable. As with most police forces in Great Britain, a majority of Metropolitan Police officers do not carry firearms.

=== Historical numbers ===
- 1852: 5,625
- 1866: 6,839
- 1877: 10,336^
- 1887: 14,191
- 1912: 20,529
- 1929: 19,290
- 1938: 18,511
- 1944: 17,976*
- 1952: 16,400
- 1965: 18,016
- 1984: 27,000 (approximate)
- 2001: 25,000 (approximate)
- 2003: 28,000 (approximate)
- 2004: 31,000 (approximate)
- 2009: 32,543 (excluding 2,622 special constables)
- 2010: 33,260 (excluding 3,125 special constables)
- 2011: 32,380 (excluding 4,459 special constables)
- 2013: 30,398 (excluding 5,303 special constables)
- 2014: 30,932 (excluding 4,587 special constables)
- 2015: 31,877
- 2016: 32,125
- 2017: 30,817
- 2019: 30,980 (excluding 1,749 special constables)
- 2020: 32,766 (excluding 1,874 special constables)
- 2024: 33,972 (excluding 1,296 special constables)
- 2025: 33,201 (excluding 1,127 special constables)

*include temporary constables from war period

^includes 753 officers policing Woolwich Arsenal and Her Majesty's Dockyards in Chatham, Portsmouth, Pembroke, Devonport and Rosyth.

=== Present numbers ===
- Police officers (regular – of all ranks): 33,201
- Specially Trained Officers (STO): 7,615
- Police officers (special – of all ranks): 1,127

== Staff and PCSOs ==
The Met's police staff are non-warranted civilians. When the Met was formed in 1829, there were only six of them (the Receiver, his two clerks and the three Commissioners' clerks, although the Commissioners were also non-warranted right up until 2011), but they now include police community support officers (PCSOs (Note: The Met was the first constabulary to introduce PCSOs in September 2002.)), designated detention officers (DDOs), and many other non-officer roles. Their numbers are currently:

- Police staff (designated detention officers): 614
- Police staff (other): 9,814

== Resources ==
=== Fleet ===
As of May 2026, the Met operates and maintains a fleet of around 5,500 vehicles, with almost a third (30%) fully electric or hybrid. In 2018, the fleet covered 46,777,720 miles (75,281,440 km).

The majority of its vehicles have a service life of three to five years; the Met replaces or upgrades between 800 and 1,000 vehicles each year.

Volvo V90, wearing Battenberg livery, 2023

Vehicles were maintained and repaired on contract by Babcock International; from November 2023, the contract for 3,700 of the Met's 5,200 vehicles was undertaken by Rivus Fleet Solutions for a ten-year period. Rivus fell into administration on 21 June 2024, with a deal being agreed by the Metropolitan Police to buy back its maintenance operations, saving 165 jobs. In 2026, the Met selected BetterFleet to provide charge management software for its EV fleet.

By 2012, the Met was marking all new marked vehicles with Battenburg markings, a highly reflective material on the side of the vehicles, chequered blue and yellow green for the police, and in other colours for other services.

Mercedes Sprinter personnel carrier, wearing half Battenberg livery

The old livery was an orange stripe through the vehicle, with the force's logo, known colloquially as the "jam sandwich", which was first introduced in 1978 with the delivery of high-performance Rover SD1 traffic cars.

A restored Rover SD1 traffic car in the Metropolitan Police's 'jam sandwich' livery first introduced in 1978.

Originally, marked vehicles were finished in base white paint; this was changed to silver from 2002 to help improve a vehicle's resale value when it was retired from police use.

The current fleet comprises numerous vehicles, including:

- Incident response vehicles (IRV): attached to the various Basic Command Units (BCU) of the Metropolitan Police area, used for frontline policing duties such as patrol and emergency response.
- Q-cars: covert unmarked vehicles, belonging to a variety of departments.
- Armed response vehicle (ARV): Transports authorised firearms officers trained to use firearms to deal with incidents involving deadly weapons.
- Traffic units: respond to traffic accidents on major roads, enforce traffic laws and encourage road safety.
- Motorcycles: utilised by the Roads and Transport Policing Command and Parliamentary and Diplomatic Protection for more agile patrol and response.
- Scrambler bikes: used by Operation Venice officers to combat moped gangs.
- Collision investigation units (CIU): respond to and appropriately investigate all major road traffic collisions.
- Protected carriers: used for public order duties.
- Personnel carriers: used to transport numerous officers on patrol and to incidents, as well as non-violent public order situations.
- Station vans: used to transport both officers and suspects in a cage in the rear of the van.
- Commercial vehicle units: used to respond to incidents involving commercial vehicles.
- CBRN units: used to mitigate chemical, biological, radiological and nuclear incidents. These are identified by a large number of equipment lockers on newer vans and a large array of detecting equipment on the top of older vans.
- Control units: used for incident command and control purposes.
- Armoured multi-role vehicles: used for public order duties, airport and counter-terrorism duties, or as required.
- General purpose vehicles: used for general support and transportation duties of officers or equipment.
- Training vehicles: used to train police drivers.
- Miscellaneous vehicles: such as horseboxes and trailers.
- The Metropolitan Police Historic Vehicle Collection
- The National Police Air Service provides helicopter support to the Met.
- A marine policing unit operates 22 vessels from its base in Wapping.

=== Budget ===
Funding for the Metropolitan Police has been cut owing to austerity. Changes in the way the government pays for police pensions will lead to further cuts. Its expenditure for single years, not adjusted for inflation, has been:

Year	Amount	Notes
1829/30	£194,126	
1848	£437,441	
1873	£1.1 million	
1898	£1.8 million	
1923	£7.8 million	
1948	£12.6 million	
1973	£95 million	
1998/9	£2.03 billion	
2011/12	£3.69 billion	£2.754 billion was spent on staff wages
2017/18	£3.26 billion	

Due to large pro-Palestinian demonstrations in London during the Gaza genocide, the Metropolitan Police reported significant policing costs and operational demands. By June 2024, the cost of policing Palestine-related protests had risen to nearly £43 million and required almost 52,000 Met officers' shifts. A senior Met officer stated that policing the protests reduced capacity for other policing work, such as counter-terrorism and neighbourhood policing.

=== Specialist units ===
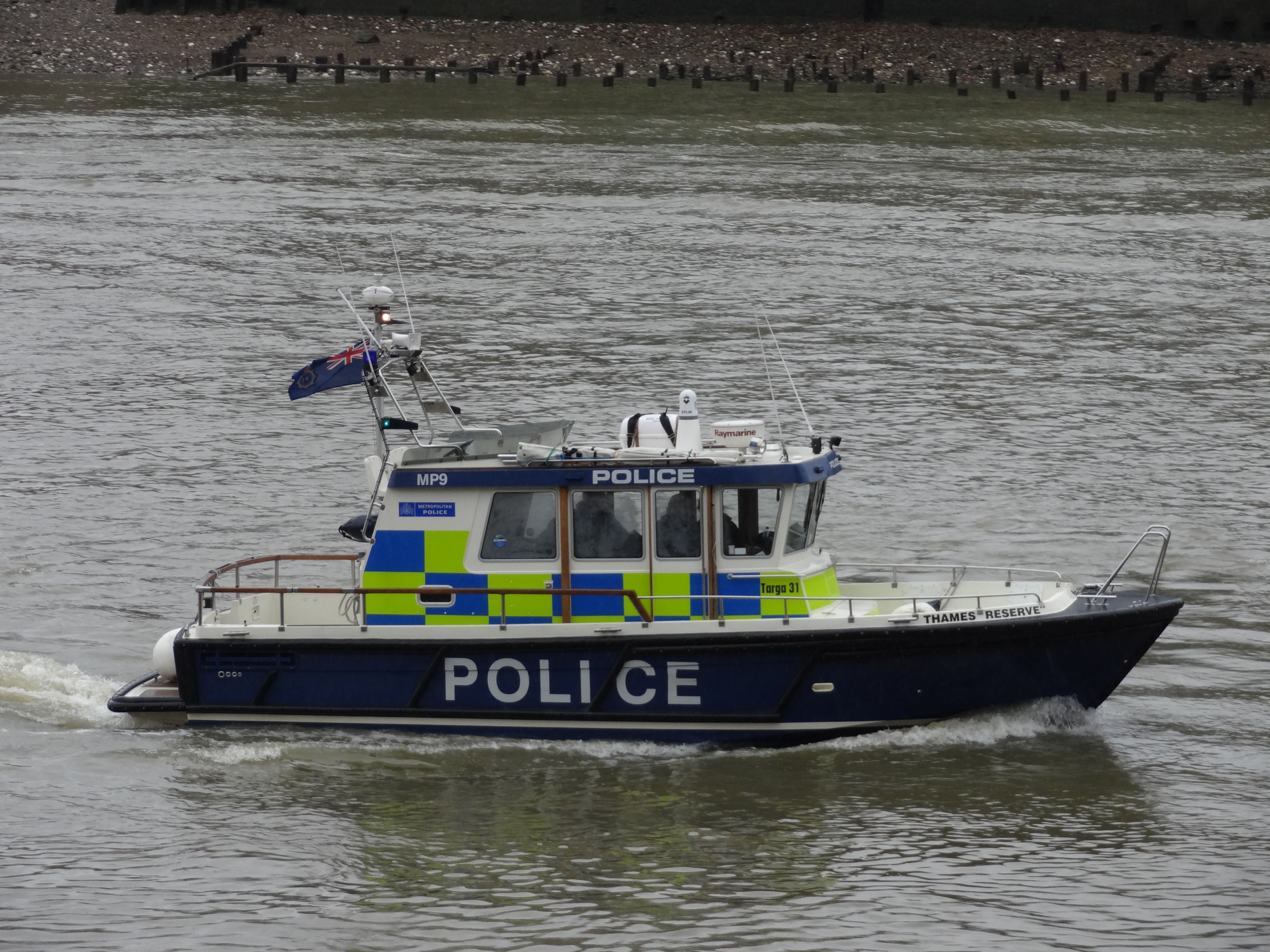
A marine policing unit on the River Thames

- Protection Command – This command is split into two branches: Royalty and Specialist Protection (RaSP) and Parliamentary and Diplomatic Protection (PaDP). RaSP provides personal armed protection for the Royal family, Prime Minister and other ministers, ambassadors and visiting heads of state. PaDP is responsible for providing armed officers to protect the Palace of Westminster, important residences such as Downing Street and the many embassies found located in London. Royal Palaces are the responsibility of RaSP. The Special Escort Group (SEG) is responsible for escorting the Royal Family, Prime Minister and other ministers, ambassadors and visiting heads of state, and occasionally prisoner transport.
- Aviation Policing Command – Responsible for providing policing (with the majority being armed officers) at Heathrow Airport and London City Airport.
- Flying Squad – A unit that investigates and intercepts armed robberies. The name comes from the fact its members travelled across divisional and borough boundaries.
- Trident Gang Crime Command – Investigates and works to prevent gang crime.
- Roads and Transport Policing Command – Provides policing for the transport network in London, comprising numerous divisions: the Traffic Division, patrols the road, pursuing fleeing suspects and enforcing speed, safety, and drink driving; the Road Crime Team focuses on dangerous drivers, priority roads, uninsured vehicles and 'fatal four' offences; the Safer Transport Team (STT) provide a policing presence on Transport for London's buses and investigates most crimes committed on them.
- Specialist Firearms Command – (MO19) Responsible for providing armed response and support across the whole of London with Authorised Firearms Officers (AFO) travelling in ARVs (Armed Response Vehicles) responding to calls involving firearms and weapons. MO19 employs a number of CTSFOs (Counter Terrorist Specialist Firearms Officers), who have additional training, specifically at lengths in order to combat terrorism.
- Dog Support Unit – (DSU) Provides highly trained dogs and police handlers, under MO7 Taskforce. They are trained to detect drugs and firearms, respond to searches, missing people, and fleeing suspects. Bomb-detection dogs are also used for specific duties. As of 2015 the unit had around 250 police dogs.
- Marine Policing Unit – (MPU) Provides policing on the waterways of London, responding to situations in the River Thames and tracking and stopping illegal vessels entering and exiting London.
- Mounted Branch – Provides policing on horseback in London, under MO7 Taskforce. One of its duties is escorting the Royal Guard down The Mall, into and out of Buckingham Palace every morning from April to July, then occasionally through the remainder of the year. It also provides public order support and is commonly called to police football matches in the event of any unrest. All officers are trained in public order tactics on horseback. As of 2010, the Branch had 120 police horses.
- Police Support Unit (PSU) – Trained to deal with a variety of public order situations outside the remit or capability of regular divisional officers. These are often regular Emergency Response and Patrol Team Carriers, as such of both Borough Support Units (BSU) and Public Order Borough Support Units (POBSU), the latter of which carrying officers often trained in Public Order Level 2 (POL2)
- Territorial Support Group (TSG) – Highly trained officers, specialised in public order and large-scale riots responding around London in marked Public Order Carriers (POC) with 6 constables and a sergeant in each POC. TSG officers are specifically trained in Public Order Level 1 (POL1), handling the most violent of riots or protests. They also hold Method of Entry (MOE) qualifications as an aid to local response officers. They aim to secure the capital against terrorism, respond to any disorder in London, and reduce priority crime through borough support. They respond in highly protective uniform during riots or large disorder, protecting themselves from any thrown objects or hazards.
- Violent Crime Task Force (VCTF) – Formed in April 2018, the VCTF is a pan-London proactive response team to knife and serious violent crime, made up of 300 ring-fenced and dedicated police officers who solely focus on violent crime, weapon-enabled crime and serious criminality. This, however, has since been disbanded and created into both Borough Based Violence Suppression Units (VSU) and MO7 Taskforce Surge Team. (TST)
- Operation Venice – Formed in 2017 to deal with record-breaking moped crime in London, but also tackles different types of robbery trends; the Scorpion Team consists of highly skilled drivers and riders who were given a green light to instigate tactical contact against moped and motorbikes involved in criminality. This, however, has since been disbanded and replaced with the likes of Interceptor and Surge teams under MO7 Taskforce

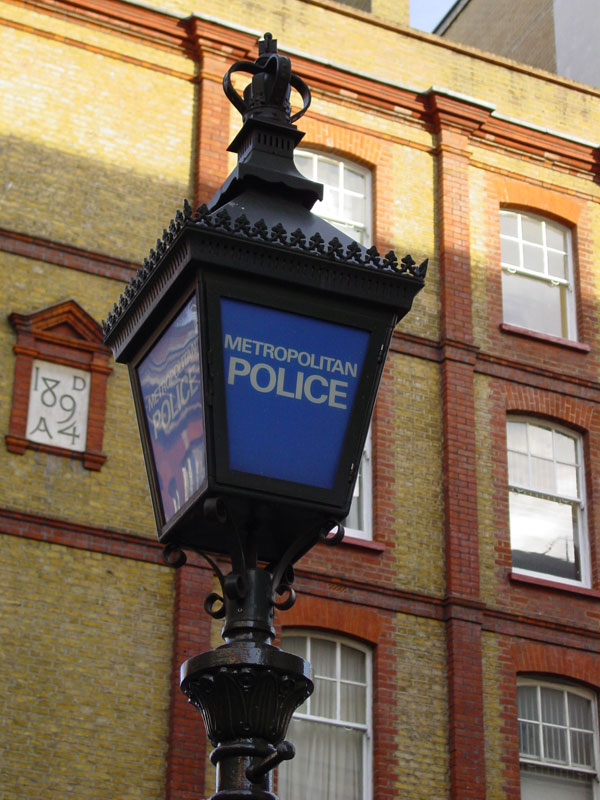
A traditional blue lamp as seen outside most police stations

=== Stations ===
In addition to the headquarters at New Scotland Yard, there are many police stations in London. These range from large borough headquarters staffed around the clock every day to smaller stations, which may be open to the public only during normal business hours, or on certain days of the week. In 2017, there were 73 working front counters open to the public in London. Most police stations can easily be identified from one or more blue lamps located outside the entrance, which were introduced in 1861.

The oldest Metropolitan police station, which opened in Bow Street in 1881, closed in 1992 and the adjoining Bow Street Magistrates' Court heard its last case on 14 July 2006. One of the oldest operational police stations in London is in Wapping, which opened in 1908. It is the headquarters of the marine policing unit (formerly known as Thames Division), which is responsible for policing the River Thames. It also houses a mortuary and the River Police Museum. Paddington Green Police Station, which is no longer operational, received much publicity for its housing of terrorism suspects in an underground complex prior to its closure in 2017.

In 2004, there was a call from the Institute for Public Policy Research for more imaginative planning of police stations to aid in improving relations between police forces and the wider community.

== Statistics ==
=== Outcome and detection rates ===
From 2015 the MPS has published monthly 'positive outcome' rates, a somewhat wider definition from the previous 'sanction detection' rates for offenders receiving some formal sanction such as being charged or summonsed. These include charges, but also outcomes such as Penalty Notices for Disorder (PNDs), warnings for cannabis possession, offences that are asked to be taken into consideration by a court (TICs), cautions, warnings, and reprimands.

Nationally, detection rates have been falling as police-reported crime has been rising. The following table shows the percentage 'sanction detection' rates for the Metropolitan Police by offence group for 2022/2023:

Total	Violence against the person	Sexual offences	Robbery	Burglary	Offences against vehicles	Other theft offences	Fraud and forgery	Criminal damage	Drug offences	Other offences
7.3	8.1	9	7.3	6.3	0.9	1.9	N/A	5.7	38	23.9

The corresponding figures for 2010–2011 were far higher, with an average total detection rate of 24%. However, largely owing to the history of changes in the way the UK police count offenses, crime numbers have seen significant increases since 1998, and particularly from 2014 onward. The same volume of detections is therefore divided by a much larger number of total recorded offences. While this does not fully explain the drop in detection rates, it is thought to have contributed to it. Other reasons include lack of police resources and that the crimes the police record disproportionately affect those offences, which (in law, if not by the public) are treated as the least serious.

In 2017, the MPS "screened out" 34,164 crimes on the day they were reported, and did not investigate them further. This compares to 13,019 the previous year. 18,093 crimes were closed in 24 hours during the first 5 months of 2018 making it likely that the 2017 total would be exceeded. Crimes not being investigated include sexual assaults and arson, burglaries, thefts and assaults. Some critics believe this shows the effect of austerity on the force's ability to carry out its responsibilities.

In 2024, it was reported that there was a zero-detection rate for crimes within 166 neighborhood areas under the responsibility of the Metropolitan Police Service. A report by His Majesty's Inspectorate of Constabulary and Fire & Rescue Services said that the Met was rated inadequate or failing regarding crime investigations and managing offenders. It was rated as requiring improvement in five other areas, and as adequate in one.

== Controversies ==
The Met was controversial even before its formation in 1829. Since the 1970s, such controversies have often centred on institutional racism and institutional sexism within the organisation, along with the right to protest, (Note: In August 2023 Graham Smith issued a claim for judicial review against the Metropolitan police commissioner regarding Smith's arrest on the day of the king's coronation, when he was preparing to demonstrate against the monarchy.) failures in investigations, (Note: In December 2021, an inquest jury ruled that the deaths in 2014–2015 of serial killer Stephen Port's final three victims was due in part to the Met Police's failings. The inquest found that the Met "failed to carry out basic checks, send evidence to be forensically examined, and exercise professional curiosity while Port was embarking on his killing spree".) and officers belonging to proscribed organisations. (Note: In April 2021 an early-career Metropolitan police officer, Ben Hannam, was found guilty of being a member of a banned neo-Nazi terrorist group.)

In 1993, the investigation into the racially motivated murder of Stephen Lawrence was heavily criticised. The subsequent Macpherson Inquiry (1999) found the Metropolitan Police to be "institutionally racist", a landmark finding that mandated significant police reform efforts across the UK.

The Met faced widespread criticism over the actions of officers during the 2009 G20 London summit protests, including the death of demonstrator Ian Tomlinson after being struck by an officer. This led to public criticism over excessive force and officers concealing their identification numbers.

In 2011, it was disclosed that a number of undercover officers had entered into intimate relationships with members of targeted groups, and even proposed marriage or fathered childred with protesters who were unaware their partner was a police officer in a role as part of their official duties. The groups affected were predominantly left-wing and progressive.

In 2020, two officers assigned to guard the scene of the murders of Bibaa Henry and Nicole Smallman were jailed for taking and sharing photographs of the deceased women on WhatsApp, referring to them as "dead birds".

In 2021 a review into the handling of the investigation of the murder of Daniel Morgan found that the Met Police was "institutionally corrupt".

In 2023, a report found racism, misogyny, homophobia and corruption within the organisation after the abduction of Sarah Everard by Wayne Couzens, a police constable. 12% of female Met employees had been harassed or attacked, with 33% experiencing sexism. Other incidents included a Muslim officer who had bacon stuffed into his boots and a Sikh officer whose beard was cut. The report also found that officers of minority ethnic backgrounds were more likely to be disciplined and leave the force. The report was criticised by the charity Galop for not investigating transphobia. Five former officers admitted in court in 2023 to sending racist messages, the targets of which included the Duchess of Sussex, and a sixth was convicted after a trial. All six were given suspended jail sentences.

The Metropolitan Police was criticised in 2024 by former Prime Minister Boris Johnson for its efforts to support an investigation into alleged Israeli war crimes. The Met responded by saying, under the terms of the 1998 Rome Statute, it was obliged to support any investigations opened by the International Criminal Court (ICC) that could involve British subjects.

In 2024, His Majesty's Inspectorate of Constabulary and Fire & Rescue Services issued a report regarding the Met's handling of pro-Palestinian protests, saying the Met had been largely impartial. The report criticised the then Prime Minister Rishi Sunak and the then Home Secretary Suella Braverman for suggesting otherwise.

In April 2024, the Met settled a claim for misfeasance in a public office and false imprisonment by agreeing to pay a five-figure sum as damages to a French publisher who had been arrested and detained under anti-terrorism laws while he was on his way to a book fair in London.

In November 2024, it was alleged that the Metropolitan Police was told about allegations of sexual assault against Mohamed Al-Fayed, the late businessman and owner of Harrods, ten years earlier than it had acknowledged. The Met claimed that it first received such allegations in 2005, but the BBC was told that it had been informed by victims in 1995, but had not acted on the information. On 8 November, the Independent Office for Police Conduct announced that it would be investigating the Met over its handling of allegations of sexual misconduct related to the case.

In December 2025, the Metropolitan Police and Greater Manchester Police announced tougher enforcement measures following reports that antisemitic incidents in Britain had increased more than fourfold since October 2023. The announcement followed heightened security concerns after fatal attacks on Jewish communities in Britain and abroad, including a Synagogue attack in Manchester and a mass shooting at a Hanukkah event in Bondi Beach, Sydney, Australia. In a joint statement, police warned that pro-Palestinian chants such as "Intifada" and "globalise the intifada" carried "real-world consequences", and confirmed they would "act decisively and make arrests" where offences were identified.

=== Freemasonry ===
There have long been rumours of undue influence of Freemasonry within the Metropolitan Police. In 2025, Freemasons' organizations took legal action to secure an injunction against a policy that would force Freemasons within the Metropolitan Police to reveal their affiliation. As of January 2026, although the injunction has yet to be ruled on, more than 300 Metropolitan Police officers had already declared themselves to be Freemasons.

== See also ==
- 2010 United Kingdom student protests
- Bent Coppers, 2003 non-fiction book that examines police corruption within the MPS
- Crimint
- Hendon Police College
- Institutional racism in the Metropolitan Police
- Institutional sexism in the Metropolitan Police
- London Emergency Services Liaison Panel
- The Met: Policing London
- List of British police officers killed in the line of duty
- Metropolitan police role in phone hacking scandal
- News International phone hacking scandal
- Project Griffin
- Royal National Lifeboat Institution
