= James Small-Edwards =

British politician

James Small-Edwards AM
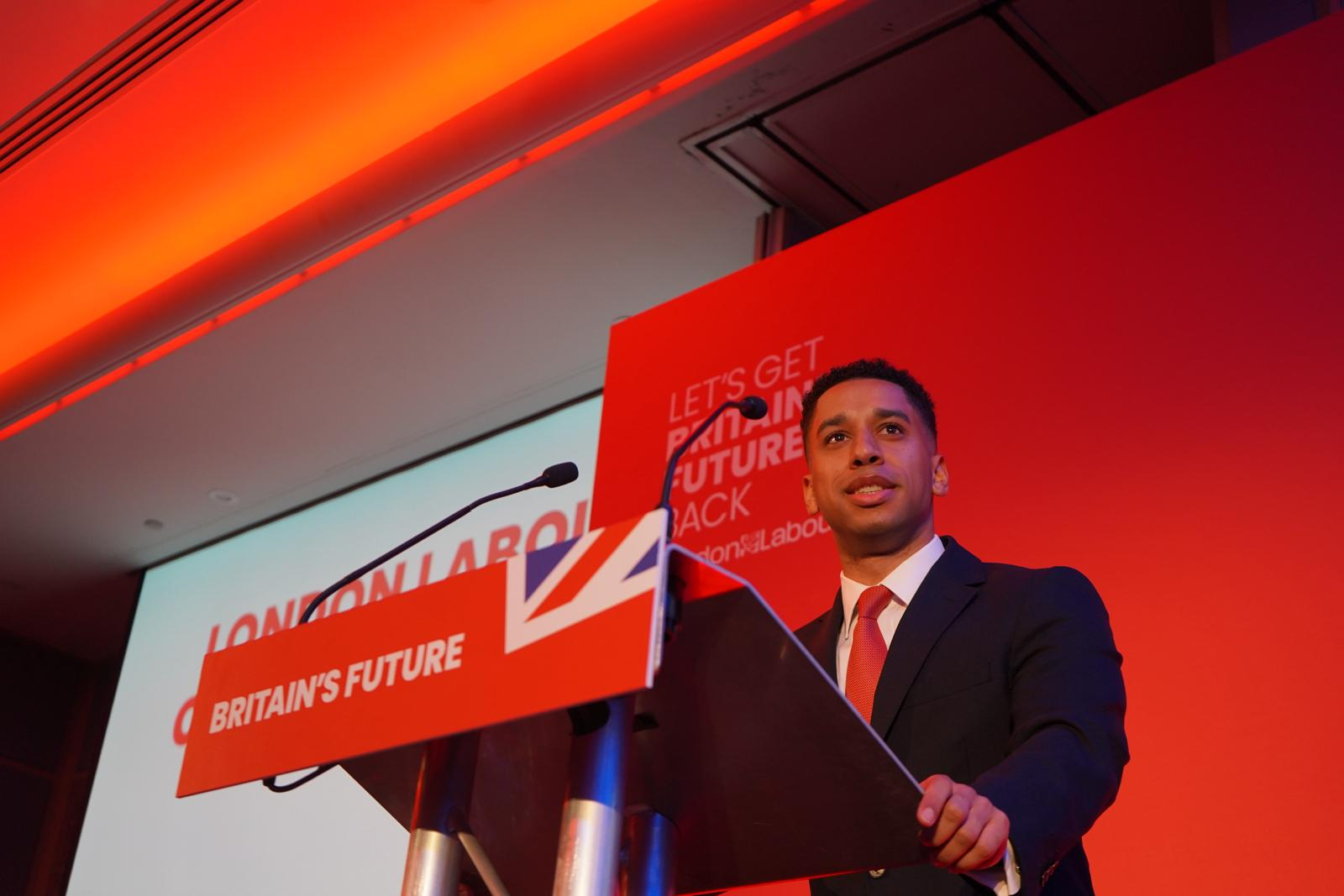
- Small-Edwards at London Labour Conference, 2024

Member of the London Assembly for West Central
- Incumbent
- Assumed office 6 May 2024
- Preceded by: Tony Devenish
- Majority: 4,253 (3.5%)

Member of Westminster City Council for Bayswater
- In office 5 May 2022 – 7 May 2026

Personal details
- Born: James Tacuma Small-Edwards
- Party: Labour
- Parents: Shaun Edwards; Heather Small
- Education: University of Edinburgh (MA); Balliol College, Oxford (MPP)
- Website: Official website

James Tacuma Small-Edwards is a British politician serving as Member of the London Assembly for West Central since 2024. A member of the Labour Party, he served as a Member of Westminster City Council between 2022 and 2026.

He is a former rugby player and the son of Shaun Edwards, and the soul singer Heather Small. Small-Edwards studied politics at the University of Edinburgh and earned a Master of Public Policy (MPP) degree from the University of Oxford.

In 2022, he won a seat representing the ward of Bayswater on Westminster City Council for the Labour Party. He was appointed Deputy Cabinet Member for Planning and Economic Development following his election. He retired from Westminster Council at the 2026 election.

In 2024, he became the representative for West Central after winning in the 2024 London Assembly election, defeating the Conservative Party incumbent, Tony Devenish. This makes him the first non-Conservative representative for West Central since the London Assembly was created in 2000.
