= Deputy Mayor of London for Business =

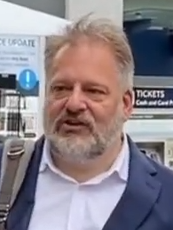
- Incumbent; Howard Dawber since 18 December 2023
- Member of: Mayoral cabinet
- Appointer: Mayor of London
- Inaugural holder: Kit Malthouse

The Deputy Mayor of London for Business is a position appointed by the Mayor of London. The inaugural holder of the Deputy Mayor of London for Business and Enterprise office, Kit Malthouse, was appointed by Mayor Boris Johnson in 2012. He was succeeded by Rajesh Agrawal, and the position renamed to Deputy Mayor of London for Business. Agrawal stepped down in November 2023 after he was selected to stand as an MP. He was replaced by Howard Dawber as Deputy Mayor of London for Business and Growth the next month.

== List of Deputy Mayors of London for Business ==
Portrait	Name	Title	Took office	Left office	Party	Mayor of London	Ref.
Kit Malthouse	Kit Malthouse	Deputy Mayor of London for Business and Enterprise	9 May 2012	9 May 2016	Conservative	Boris Johnson	
Rajesh Agrawal	Rajesh Agrawal	Deputy Mayor of London for Business	9 May 2016	27 November 2023	Labour	Sadiq Khan	
Howard Dawber	Howard Dawber	Deputy Mayor of London for Business and Growth	18 December 2023	Incumbent	Labour	Sadiq Khan	
