= Howard Dawber =

London Deputy Mayor for Business

Howard Dawber OBE
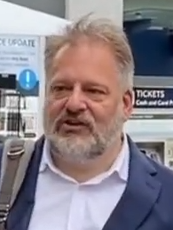
- Dawber in 2025

Deputy Mayor of London for Business
- Incumbent
- Assumed office 18 December 2023
- Mayor: Sadiq Khan
- Preceded by: Rajesh Agrawal

Personal details
- Born: 26 July 1970 (age 55)
- Party: Labour
- Education: Manchester Grammar School
- Alma mater: King's College London

Howard Dawber (born 26 July 1970) is a British Labour politician and businessman. He is Deputy Mayor of London for Business, chair of London and Partners and a board member of the Oxford Street Development Corporation.

== Early life ==
He was educated at Manchester Grammar School and King's College London.

== Career ==
Dawber worked initially as a public affairs consultant. From 2004, he was a strategic advisor for the Canary Wharf Group, and worked as managing director of strategy until 2022. He was a Legacy Trust UK board member. He is a trustee of The Line and joined the advisory board in 2017.

== Political career ==
Howard Dawber was an elected chair of the Young Fabians. He was the Labour Party prospective parliamentary candidate in the Cheadle constituency in 2001. He stood to be a councillor in the Town ward of the London Borough of Hammersmith and Fulham in 2002. He stood to be a councillor in the Manor ward of the Metropolitan Borough of Stockport in 2004. He stood to be a councillor in the Fortune Green ward of the London Borough of Camden in May 2006. In August 2007, he was selected to be the Labour Party prospective parliamentary candidate for the southeast London seat of Bexleyheath and Crayford. He was appointed as Deputy Mayor of London for Business and chair of London and Partners on 18 December 2023. He was appointed as a board member of the Oxford Street Development Corporation on 1 January 2026. In May 2024, he additionally took over as deputy mayor for skills, without change of job title.

== Honours ==
Dawber was appointed an Officer of the Order of the British Empire (OBE) in the 2025 Birthday Honours for services to local government and to the community in East London.

Party political offices
Preceded by Peter Metcalfe	Chair of the Young Fabians; 1998–1999	Succeeded by Seema Malhotra
