= Institutional racism in the Metropolitan Police =

Institutional racism in London's Metropolitan Police

Institutional racism in the Metropolitan Police refers to racism in the United Kingdom's London Metropolitan Police Service, dating back to at least the 1970s. Statistics on stop and search show a disproportionate number of such searches targeting those from ethnic minorities. Criticism is also levelled at the use of stop and search on children, particularly children from black and ethnic minority backgrounds. In response, the Metropolitan Police has acknowledged the problem, and made efforts to increase diversity in recruitment and address racial bias.

== History ==
Institutional racism has been acknowledged in the London Metropolitan Police (Met) since at least the 1970s and has received significant coverage.

In 1970, a group of British black activists known as the Mangrove Nine were tried for violent clashes during a protest against the police targeting of The Mangrove restaurant in Notting Hill. The nine men were all acquitted of the most serious charges and the trial became the first judicial acknowledgement of racial hatred within the Met.

Following the murder of Stephen Lawrence in 1993, Judge William Macpherson headed a public inquiry (1998) into the handling of the original Met investigation of the murder. The inquiry concluded that the investigation was incompetent, coining the phrase "institutionalised racism" to describe the behaviour of the police.

In a 1995 study, sociologist Jock Young found that of 1000 randomly selected residents of Finsbury Park who were asked if they had been stopped by the police over the past year, the percentage of the White Irish population who reported being stopped was disproportionately large, at 14.3%, in contrast to 12.8% of Black Caribbean and 5.8% of White British people. The researchers found the Police tactic of waiting outside Irish pubs and clubs to make arrests, to be the cause for the high percentage of White Irish who reported being stopped. This was labelled a form of 'institutionalised racism'.

In 2005, police shot dead Jean Charles de Menezes, a Brazilian man who had wrongly been identified as a perpetrator of the attempted terrorist bombings the day before.

During the 2020 COVID-19 pandemic, the Metropolitan police were found to be 2.17 times as likely to issue fines to black people for lockdown breaches, relative to the general population. While more white people received Fixed Penalty Notices (FPNs) or were arrested than other individual ethnic groups, when compared with the composition of the resident population, higher proportions of those were in black and minority ethnic (BAME) groups. The Met pointed out that this was likely to reflect a range of factors including more proactive policing targeting crime hotspots, and both the variation in the age profile and geographical distribution of ethnic groups in London.

In 2019 it was found that strip searches were disproportionately done to black and ethnic minority suspects. Inspectors found the number, "higher than we normally see", and involved, "many children and a significantly higher proportion of black and minority ethnic detainees". Metropolitan Police have strip searched 5,279 children during the three years up to 2022 and 75% (3,939) were from ethnically diverse backgrounds according to the LBC. Sixteen children strip searched were between ten and twelve years old. Statistics only cover children strip searched following arrest and the actual figures are likely to be higher. On 24 June 2022, Metropolitan police referred itself to the Independent Office for Police Conduct (IOPC) for investigation of eight strip-searches of youngsters under 18. Reforms were introduced including that an inspector will have to approve a strip-search of a child, an appropriate adult will have to be present and there will have to be a report. This recognised the fact that children may be victims of exploitation by others involved in gangs, county lines and drug dealing

The Met stated "We have reviewed the policy for 'further searches' for those aged under 18 and made changes. This is to assure ourselves the policy is appropriate {...} and that it recognises the fact a child in these circumstances may well be a vulnerable victim of exploitation by others involved in gangs, county lines and drug dealing."

Between 2018 and 2020 there were 650 strip-searches of children, 23% were without an appropriate adult. 58% of boys searched were black. Rachel de Souza, the Children's Commissioner for England, said this may have been an example of a more systemic problem of child protection within the Met. The majority of children strip-searched were innocent. (95%) of youngsters strip-searched were boys, and a quarter were under 16. In September 2023, Detective Superintendent James Conway said that the Met had been overusing the power of strip search, and that the Met had made changes in the procedure.

Two years later, in March 2022, it was revealed that a 15-year old black girl, referred to as Child Q, was strip-searched by police in school without an adult present after wrongly being suspected of being in possession of Cannabis. An independent safeguarding report concluded the incident was unjustified and racism was likely a factor. In March 2022, it was reported that Child Q was suing the Metropolitan Police and pursuing civil action against her school. The two police officers who carried out the strip search have been removed from front line duties. In September 2023, the IOPC announced that four officers would face misconduct charges over the Child Q case. A hearing of misconduct allegations against three officers was held in June 2025. The panel decided that two officers were guilty of gross misconduct, and they were dismissed. A third officer was found guilty of misconduct, and was given a final written warning. The IOPC had argued that race was a reason for the strip search, but the panel disagreed.

In September 2023, an investigation was launched into several officers, four of which belonged to the Territorial Support Group (TSG) of the Metropolitan Police, who allegedly disproportionately searched a 16-year old Black child on six occasions within five months. The case was referred to the IOPC; in 2024, their investigation found 'evidence which indicates potential breaches of the police standards of professional behaviour' on five out of six occasions. A total of eight officers are under investigation, with seven for potential gross misconduct and one for potential misconduct. The IOPC Director acknowledged in the February 2024 report that 'racial profiling of a child and insufficient grounds for stopping and searching them' are 'issues that we know disproportionately affect Black and other minority ethnic communities.'

In August 2017, black bank manager, Dale Semper, was wrongly accused of being involved in gun crime, money laundering, drug dealing, human trafficking, and terrorism. No evidence was ever found during the 2-year investigation, which was concluded with no further action. The Met did not offer an explanation for the investigation. Semper alleged that the Met had engaged in racial discrimination, false imprisonment, malicious prosecution, misfeasance, and breach of data protection. He embarked on a civil case against the Met which was settled with £1 million paid in compensation to Semper and his family. Holborn Adams solicitors represented Semper and his family in the case and the firm said the police had also agreed to reinvestigate parts of the complaints that were initially dismissed. Deputy Assistant Commissioner of the Met Police, Stuart Cundy, stated: “We stand by the necessity to act following information that was received, but accept some elements of this case were not handled as well as they could have been and we apologise for the impact this has had on the complainants."

In September 2022, there were protests over the death of Chris Kaba, who was shot and killed by a Met Police officer in south London. The police officer involved was shortly afterwards suspended pending the outcome of the investigation by the IOPC. Two police cars had chased and stopped his vehicle late at night on, following a suspected armed incident the previous day involving the vehicle Kaba was driving. The family also privately met with Scotland Yard's new Commissioner, Sir Mark Rowley, for 25 minutes after viewing the footage. On 30 March 2023, the IOPC announced that they had referred the case to the Crown Prosecution Service, with the latter announcing on 20 September that year that an officer had been charged with murder in relation to it.

== Response ==
In June 2015, the Metropolitan Police Commissioner, Sir Bernard Hogan-Howe, said there was "some justification" in claims that the Metropolitan Police Service is "institutionally racist":

I have always said if other people think we are institutionally racist then we are. It is no good me saying we are not and then saying you must believe me, it's nonsense, if they believe that. I think it is a label but in some sense there is a truth there for some people ... You're very much more likely to be stopped and searched if you're a young black man. I can't explain that fully. I can give you reasons but I can't fully explain it. So there is some justification ... I think in some ways society is institutionally racist. We see lack of representation in many fields, of which the police are one.

In 2022, HMICFRS expressed "systemic concerns" over the Met, including its inadequate response to emergency calls, "barely adequate" recording of crime and child abuse referrals developing a backlog. A letter from the watchdog to the Met said failures worsened due to the young and inexperienced recruits brought in as an element of the national move to replace thousands of experienced officers cut as part of austerity measures. Matt Parr of the Inspectorate wrote to Sir Stephen House that the inspectors had had "substantial and persistent concerns" about the Met "for a considerable time". The concerns included the Met's approach to tackling corruption which the letter said was "fundamentally flawed" and "not fit for purpose".

In June of that year, the Mayor of London, Sadiq Khan, said that there was evidence of "systemic sexism, racism, homophobia, discrimination, misogyny" in the Met; he accepted that there are "dedicated, decent, brave officers" as well. Khan said he felt that the new Police Commissioner would need to restore confidence in London police. Khan accepted that London crime figures are going down. The Home Secretary, Priti Patel, said the Met was not getting "the basics right" and started the process of recruiting a new Commissioner. HMICFRS special measures lasted until 2025.

In August 2022, the Met started legal proceedings against Parm Sandhu, a former senior officer who has published a book including allegations of racial and gender discrimination against her by the Met. The Met's claim is that Sandhu has breached a non-disclosure agreement which was part of a settlement agreement between Sandhu and the Met.

In 2024, the Met launched their London Race Action Plan, with the aim of becoming an "anti-racist police service", including measures to recruit and retain a more diverse staff.
