= Kit Malthouse =

British politician (born 1966)

The Right Honourable Kit Malthouse MP
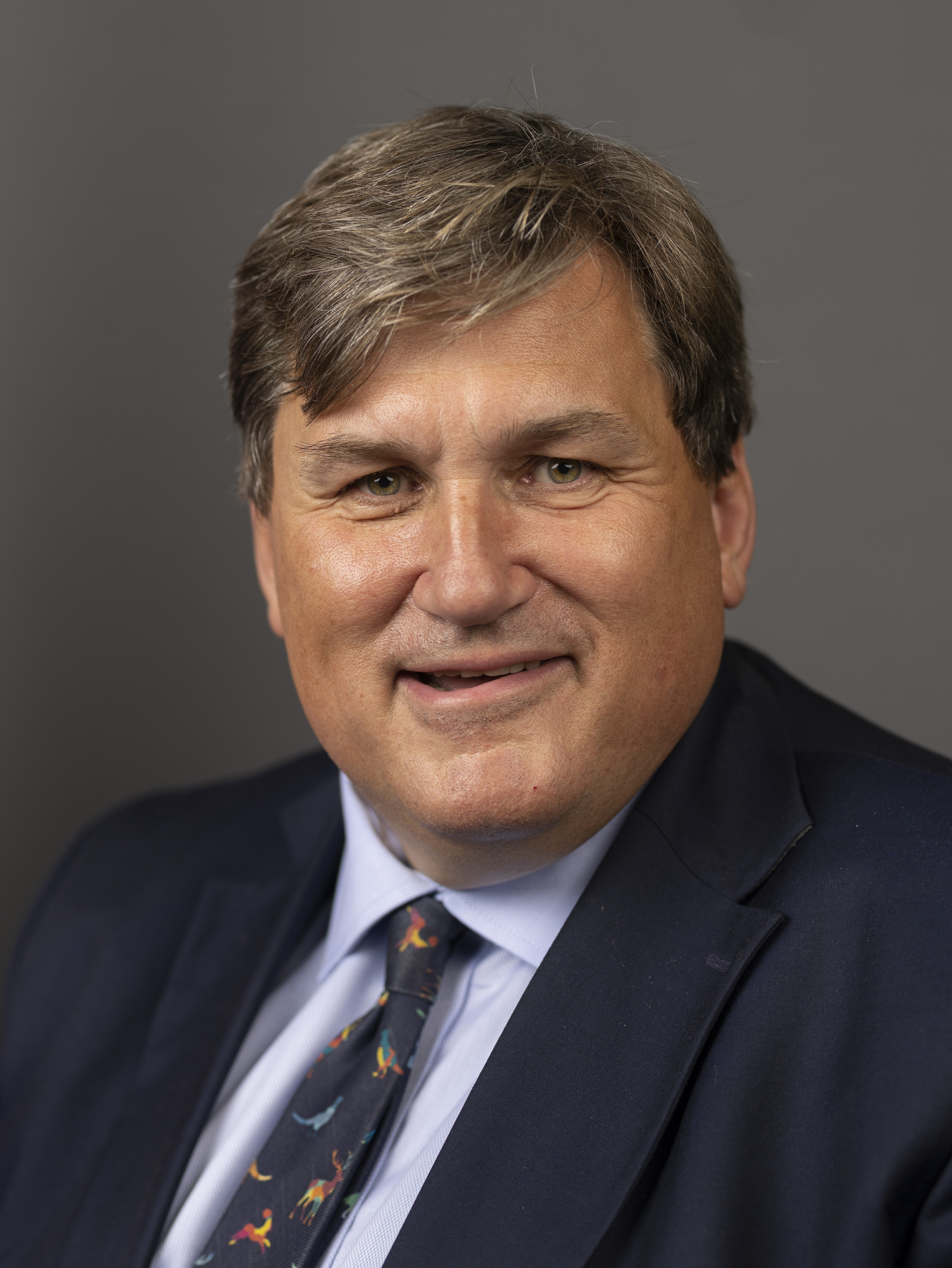
- Official portrait, 2022

Secretary of State for Education
- In office 6 September 2022 – 25 October 2022
- Prime Minister: Liz Truss
- Preceded by: James Cleverly
- Succeeded by: Gillian Keegan

Chancellor of the Duchy of Lancaster
- In office 7 July 2022 – 6 September 2022
- Prime Minister: Boris Johnson
- Preceded by: Steve Barclay
- Succeeded by: Nadhim Zahawi
Junior ministerial offices
Minister of State for Crime and Policing (Note: Jointly with the Ministry of Justice from February 2020 and responsibility for Fire services from August 2019 to February 2020.)
In office 25 July 2019 – 7 July 2022
Prime Minister	Boris Johnson
Preceded by	Nick Hurd
Succeeded by	Tom Pursglove
Minister of State for Housing and Planning
In office 9 July 2018 – 25 July 2019
Prime Minister	Theresa May
Preceded by	Dominic Raab
Succeeded by	Esther McVey
Parliamentary Under-Secretary of State for Family Support, Housing and Child Maintenance
In office 9 January 2018 – 9 July 2018
Prime Minister	Theresa May
Preceded by	Caroline Dinenage
Succeeded by	Justin Tomlinson

Member of Parliament for North West Hampshire
- Incumbent
- Assumed office 7 May 2015
- Preceded by: George Young
- Majority: 3,288 (6.5%)

Deputy Mayor of London for Business and Enterprise
- In office 9 May 2012 – 9 May 2016
- Mayor: Boris Johnson
- Preceded by: Position established
- Succeeded by: Rajesh Agrawal (Business)

Deputy Mayor of London for Policing and Crime
- In office 6 May 2008 – 9 May 2012
- Mayor: Boris Johnson
- Preceded by: Position established
- Succeeded by: Stephen Greenhalgh (Policing and Crime)

Member of the London Assembly for West Central
- In office 1 May 2008 – 5 May 2016
- Preceded by: Angie Bray
- Succeeded by: Tony Devenish

Personal details
- Born: Christopher Laurie Malthouse; 27 October 1966 (age 59) Liverpool, England
- Party: Conservative
- Spouses: Tracy-Jane Newall (m. 1996; div. 2005) Juliana Farha (m. 2007)
- Children: 3
- Education: Liverpool College
- Alma mater: Newcastle University
- Website: kitmalthouse.com

Christopher Laurie Malthouse (born 27 October 1966) is a British Conservative Party politician and businessman who has served as Member of Parliament (MP) for North West Hampshire since 2015. He served as Secretary of State for Education from 6 September to 25 October 2022, and previously served as Chancellor of the Duchy of Lancaster from July to September 2022.

Malthouse served on Westminster City Council from 1998 to 2006 and was Deputy Council Leader from 2004 to 2006. He served as a Conservative member of the London Assembly for West Central from 2008 to 2016, where he represented the City of Westminster, the London Borough of Hammersmith and Fulham, and the Royal Borough of Kensington and Chelsea. He served under then-Mayor of London Boris Johnson as Deputy Mayor for Policing from 2008 to 2012 and Deputy Mayor for Business and Enterprise from 2012 to 2015.

Malthouse was elected as Member of Parliament for North West Hampshire at the 2015 general election. Following the 2018 cabinet reshuffle, Malthouse was appointed Parliamentary Under-Secretary of State at the Department for Work and Pensions by Prime Minister Theresa May. After Dominic Raab was appointed Brexit Secretary, Malthouse served as Minister of State for Housing and Planning from 2018 to 2019. In July 2019, after Johnson succeeded May as Prime Minister, Malthouse was appointed Minister for Crime, Policing and the Fire Service. In the 2020 cabinet reshuffle, he was appointed Minister of State for Crime and Policing at the Home Office and the Ministry of Justice, before being promoted to Chancellor of the Duchy of Lancaster during the July 2022 government crisis. After a brief tenure as Education Secretary under Prime Minister Liz Truss, Malthouse returned to the backbenches following her resignation.

== Early life and career ==
Christopher Malthouse was born on 27 October 1966 in the Aigburth suburb of Liverpool, the son of Susan and John Christopher Malthouse. He was educated at Sudley County Primary, a state school, and Liverpool College, then a private school. He studied politics and economics at Newcastle University.

Malthouse trained to be a chartered accountant at Touche Ross & Company, qualifying in 1995. He then left and worked as Finance Director of the Cannock Group.

== Political career ==
=== Westminster City Council (1998–2006) ===
Malthouse was elected to Westminster City Council in May 1998, representing St George's ward. Following boundary changes, he was re-elected in May 2002 for the Warwick ward, which is also in Pimlico. Malthouse was appointed as Chief Whip of the Conservative Group, and following a change of leader to Sir Simon Milton, he was appointed Chairman of the Social Services Committee. Two years later, he was elected Deputy Leader of the Council and became Cabinet Member for Finance.

He retired from Westminster City Council at the May 2006 local elections. Malthouse challenged the results of the 2001 population census, which he said seriously underestimated the population of the City of Westminster. Following a two-year battle with the Office for National Statistics, the City of Westminster population was revised upwards by 10% and a review of future census methodology was commissioned.

Malthouse argued against the introduction of the London congestion charge, opposing it on the grounds that the idea should not be first introduced in the most populous city in England, and that London was already one of the most expensive cities to live in.

As Deputy Leader of Westminster Council, Malthouse was responsible for agreeing to a £12.3 million settlement with Shirley Porter over the £27 million surcharge, eventually raising to £42 million in costs and interest, imposed on her as a result of the Homes for Votes gerrymandering fraud scandal.

=== First term as a member of the London Assembly (2008–2012) ===
On 26 March 2007, he was selected as the Conservative candidate for the London Assembly seat of West Central. The Assembly elections took place on 1 May 2008, and Malthouse received 53% of the vote. He was appointed Deputy Mayor for Policing two days later.

=== Deputy Mayor for Policing (2008–2012) ===
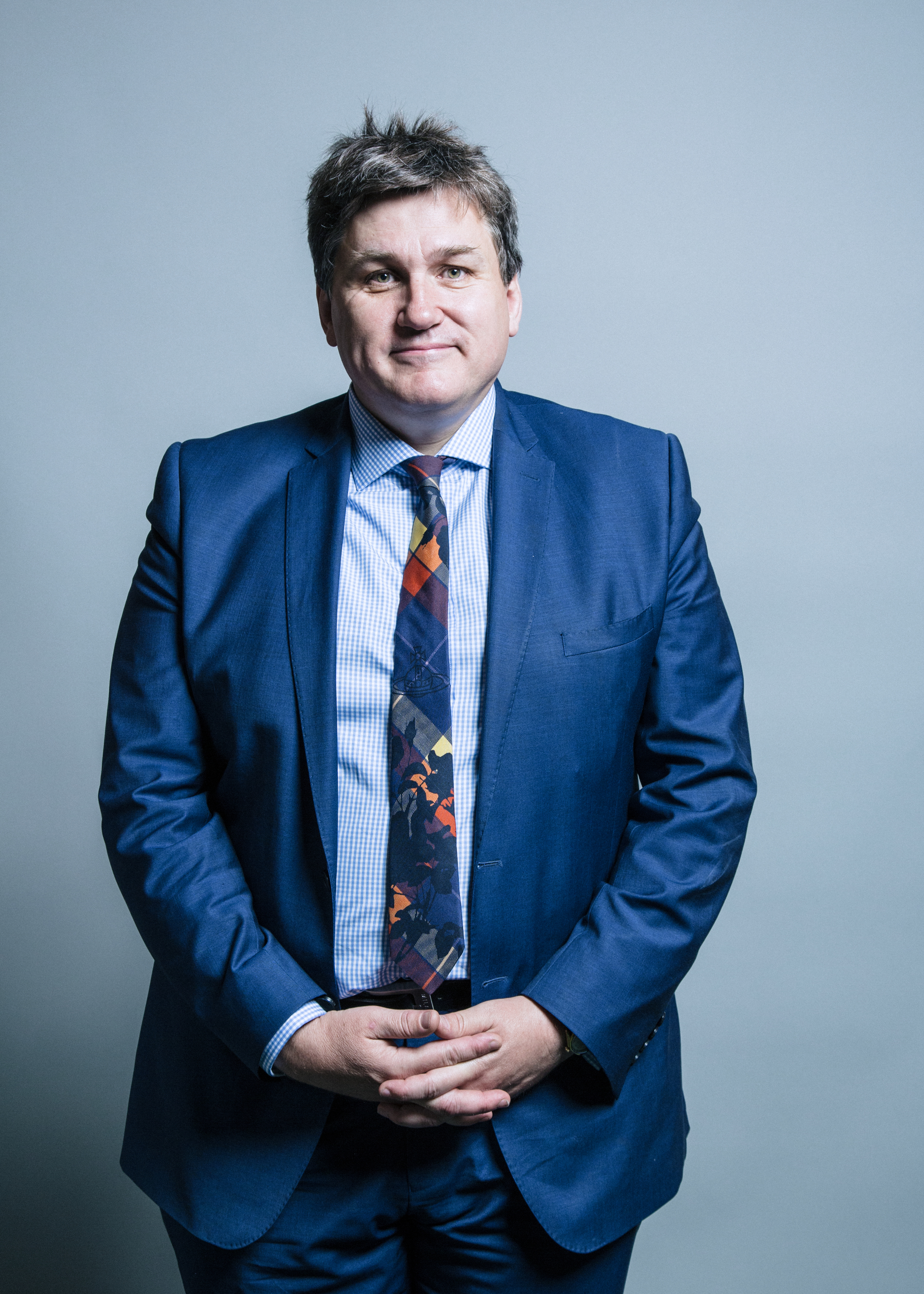
Official portrait, 2017

Malthouse was appointed Deputy Mayor of London for Policing by Mayor Boris Johnson with effect from 6 May 2008. In October 2008 he was appointed Vice Chairman of the Metropolitan Police Authority by Johnson. Malthouse was a member of the board of the Association of Police Authorities, and the London Regional Resilience Forum.

Malthouse introduced Met Forward, the Authority's strategic mission for London's police. Alongside the Mayor of London and the then Deputy Commissioner of Metropolitan Police, Malthouse released ‘Time for Action’ on 3 November 2008 in response to escalating concerns about youth violence in London. Malthouse campaigned against dangerous dogs across London. He also campaigned for changes to the dangerous dogs legislation to introduce tougher punishments and worked with the CPS to reduce the long delays in the court process to reduce the kenneling costs.

Malthouse campaigned against the presence of prostitution cards in telephone kiosks across London. He also devised the 2010 program 'The Way Forward – a plan for London to tackle violence against women and girls'. In March 2012, Malthouse was urged to resign by Labour MP Chris Bryant for reportedly saying too many police resources were allocated to the investigation into press phone hacking.

While Deputy Mayor of London, Malthouse expressed concerns about the growing numbers of foxes and said: "People are afraid to let their small children play outside because of them. They are more and more worried about the number of foxes as numbers continue to grow." Following his election to Parliament, he stated that he would vote to repeal the Hunting Act 2004, which bans the hunting of foxes with dogs.

== Parliamentary career ==
Malthouse first stood for parliament in Liverpool Wavertree at the 1997 general election, where he came third with 10.8% of the vote behind the Liberal Democrat candidate Richard Kemp and the incumbent Labour Party MP Jane Kennedy.

On 4 July 2014 it was announced that Malthouse would be selected as the Conservative candidate in the 2015 general election for North West Hampshire. The seat had been occupied by Sir George Young since 1997, who announced in 2013 that he would retire in 2015. In March 2015 Malthouse resigned his position as Deputy Mayor of London to concentrate on his parliamentary campaign; the office remained vacant until 2016. Malthouse won the seat with 58.1% of the vote, and with a majority of 23,943, (43.4%), an increase from 18,583 at the 2010 general election.

In March 2016, Malthouse was asked by the MS Society in Andover, a town in his constituency, to step down from his role as a patron. The charity felt he was no longer suitable for the role as he had recently voted to cut ESA to the same level as JSA for those in the Work Related Activity Group (WRAG).

At the snap 2017 general election Malthouse was re-elected, increasing his vote share by 4% to 62.1% but seeing his majority reduced from 23,943 to 22,679.

He served as Minister of State for Family Support in 2018 and Minister of State for Housing and Planning from 2018 to 2019. Malthouse was credited as the convener of an agreement between two Conservative party factions on Brexit which aimed to rewrite the Irish backstop. The House of Commons voted down the agreement in March 2019 after EU negotiators criticised it as unrealistic. On 27 May 2019, Malthouse announced that he was standing in the Conservative Party leadership election to replace Theresa May. On 4 June 2019, Malthouse announced that he was withdrawing from the contest.

In July 2019, Prime Minister Boris Johnson appointed Malthouse to the position of Minister for Policing, succeeding Nick Hurd. In addition to his role as Minister of State for Policing, Malthouse took on additional responsibilities as a Minister of State at the Ministry for Justice.

At the 2019 general election Malthouse was again re-elected with 62.1% of the vote, but with an increased majority of 26,308.

In July 2022, Malthouse was appointed Chancellor of the Duchy of Lancaster. In July 2022, Malthouse chaired a COBRA meeting of the civil contingencies committee to discuss the escalating heat waves in the United Kingdom. After the meeting, he stated "if people don't have to travel, this may be a moment to work from home."

In September 2022, he was appointed Secretary of State for Education, serving in that role until shortly after Liz Truss resigned on 25 October 2022.

At the 2024 general election, Malthouse was again re-elected, with a decreased vote share of 35% and a decreased majority of 3,288.

Malthouse is a co-sponsor of Kim Leadbeater's Terminally Ill Adults (End of Life) Bill on assisted dying.

== Personal life ==
Malthouse married Tracy-Jane Newall in 1996, and they had a son before divorcing in 2005. He married Juliana Farha in 2007, and they have one son and one daughter together.

== Honours ==
Malthouse was sworn as a member of Her Majesty's Most Honourable Privy Council on 20 September 2021 at Balmoral Castle, giving him the honorific prefix of "The Right Honourable" for life.

== Notes ==
Parliament of the United Kingdom
Preceded by Sir George Young, Bt	Member of Parliament for North West Hampshire; 2015–present	Incumbent
Political offices
Preceded by Steve Barclay	Chancellor of the Duchy of Lancaster; July–September 2022	Succeeded by Nadhim Zahawi
Preceded by James Cleverly	Secretary of State for Education; 2022	Succeeded by Gillian Keegan
