= Moped crime in London =

Robberies committed by offenders riding mopeds vehicle

Moped crime refers to theft of mopeds and other crimes committed using them, such as robbery. From 2014 there was a large spike in crimes of this type in London, caused by a combination of social and technological factors at the time.

The number of incidents recorded by the Metropolitan Police (MPS) went from 365 in 2011 to over 23,000 in 2017, or almost 27,000, depending on the source and exact crime classification used. A variety of policing tactics reduced this to 14,300 in 2018, and further to below 4,000 in 2021 (roughly a 50% decline), but remaining significantly higher than before the 2014 surge, when numbers stood at roughly over 1,000 per year.

== Statistics ==
Moped theft (theft of motor vehicle) and mobile enabled crimes (robbery with force) are recorded separately throughout the justice system.

In 2016/17, police recorded more than 19,385 moped-enabled crimes in London. In May 2017 the London Evening Standard claimed that at least 50,000 crimes had been committed by gangs using stolen scooters, mopeds, motorcycles and bikes. In the article, it was claimed that the vehicles were often hijacked in outer London boroughs such as Barking and Dagenham and used to commit robberies in the West End of London. The article claimed that statistics released by the Metropolitan Police revealed that up to 1,500 scooters or motorcycles were being stolen in London each month. In the previous twelve months 13,005 thefts were reported, a 41% increase over the previous period.

Q3 2020/21 police statistics showed all motor vehicle theft had reduced by 17% and total robbery was down 31% in London. COVID-19 would have had an impact on recorded data over the period. By 2021, moped-related crime had also declined by roughly 50% from its 2017 peak, while numbers stood at roughly three times higher than their pre-2014 rise. Since then the trend in moped and motorcycle theft has turned sharply downward, with around 500 thefts per month in 2026. This has been accompanied by a drop in moped-enabled phone thefts of 12%.

== Incidents (as reported by UK and local press) ==
- In October 2016 a man was sentenced after stealing 21 mobile phones in one hour. Local free newspaper, the Metro, reported an offender threatening victims in Battersea with a machete and wielding hammers during daylight robberies in Great Portland Street near Broadcasting House.
- April–May 2017: Between 18 April and 5 May 2017 a gang of three youths aged 15, 16 and 17 committed at least 103 moped-enabled offences in the central London boroughs of Camden, Islington, Kensington and Chelsea and Westminster. They were later arrested by police and pleaded guilty at the Southwark Crown Court. Two of the boys also admitted breaching criminal behaviour orders which prohibited them from riding mopeds.
- Thursday 13 July 2017: Five people in central London boroughs were attacked with acid during a 72-minute period. The victims were riding mopeds, one as a delivery driver for Deliveroo and another for Uber Eats, before being attacked with the acid and having their mopeds hijacked. One victim suffered "life-changing" injuries.
- Friday 14 July 2017: A man riding a moped had a "noxious substance", also believed to be acid, thrown at him by two males on another moped in Dagenham.
- Saturday 15 July 2017: A man was stabbed to death, with gunshots also being fired, by attackers on mopeds who demanded his phone in King William Walk, Greenwich.
- Sunday 16 July 2017: A teenager riding a stolen moped was critically injured after a collision involving a police car in Wimbledon. Two other teenagers who were also riding the moped were injured, one seriously. Police had been following the moped with the assistance of the National Police Air Service after earlier reports of an attempted robbery. Police allegedly discovered two knives at the scene. The teenager who was critically injured subsequently died.

== Causes ==
A mixture of factors were likely responsible for the spike. These included the prevalence of cheap mopeds in use in the gig economy; the relative ease which mopeds and scooters could be stolen, and the rise of trafficking in stolen mobile phones and other items. Other elements include the fact that mopeds are easily able to evade potential police cars chasing them, while the police recognise that chasing moped drivers can be a high-risk activity. Moped drivers also wear gloves, helmets and visors, making it difficult to identify them for future arrest.

== Response ==
On Tuesday 18 July 2017 moped and motorcycle delivery drivers held a protest in Parliament Square concerning the rise in attacks on riders; including hijackings and acid attacks.

On Friday 8 September 2017 The London Mayor, Sadiq Khan, launched a "zero-tolerance approach to moped crime", a collaboration between police, local authorities and the Motorcycle Crime Prevent Community (which represents motorcycle users) to help tackle moped-related crime in London. In 2023, a series of raids were launched by the Metropolitan Police. From January to May 2023, authorities recovered 400 mopeds, 150 of which were returned to their owners.

One of the most effective police tactics used against moped criminals was "tactical contact": the use of deliberate, controlled contact with scooters on the road. "DNA tagging spray" was also used: aimed by officers at moped offenders, chemically marking them with a uniquely-coded but invisible tag providing forensic evidence to link them to a specific crime. These, combined with a variety of other measures such as manufacturers retrofitting security devices, drones and LFR observation ultimately combined to bring the phenomenon under control.
