= Kaya Comer-Schwartz =

British politician

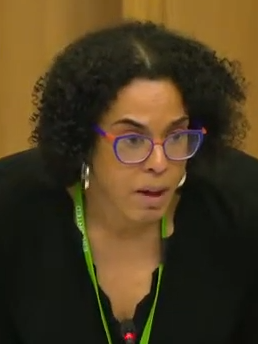

Deputy Mayor of London for Policing and Crime
- Incumbent
- Assumed office 24 October 2024
- Preceded by: Sophie Linden

Leader of Islington Council
- In office May 2021 – 24 October 2024
- Preceded by: Richard Watts
- Succeeded by: Una O'Halloran

Member of Islington London Borough Council for Junction
- In office 21 March 2013 – 24 October 2024
- Preceded by: Arthur Graves

Personal details
- Born: April 1986 (age 40) Islington, London
- Party: Labour
- Occupation: Politician

Kaya Comer-Schwartz (born April 1986) is a British politician who is currently Deputy Mayor of London for Policing and Crime. She was previously the Leader of Islington Council and the first black leader of Islington.

== Early life and career ==
Kaya Comer-Schwartz was born in Islington and is of Zimbabwean and Austrian-Jewish descent. She began her career in the charity sector, working with organisations such as the Centre for Mental Health, Shelter, World Jewish Relief, and The Women's Library.

== Islington Council ==
Comer-Schwartz's entry into politics began when she was elected to represent the Junction ward on the Islington Council at a by-election 2013. She was re-elected in 2014, 2018 and 2022.

In 2020, she became the first black deputy leader of Islington Council. In her work as deputy leader she focused on welfare improvements for children, young people, and families.

In May 2021, Comer-Schwartz was appointed Leader of Islington Council, becoming the first black woman to hold this position. Her leadership occurred during the COVID-19 pandemic.

In July 2023, Comer-Schwartz supported Islington Council's recognition of the IRA leader Michael Collins, who lived in Islington in the early 20th century.

The BBC reported that she had been asked to stand against Jeremy Corbyn for the seat of Islington North in the July 2024 United Kingdom general election, but she refused.

== Deputy mayor for policing and crime ==
On 11 October 2024, it was announced that she would resign as council leader to replace Sophie Linden as Deputy Mayor of London for Policing and Crime at City Hall.

During her confirmation hearing, Comer-Schwartz was questioned by Susan Hall about a social-media post in which she had described Hall as a "racist". Comer-Schwartz apologised for the language used. She was also questioned about her support for an Islington Council motion opposing the Metropolitan Police's use of live facial recognition, which she confirmed she had supported.

The committee ultimately did not object to her appointment but raised concerns about her ability to scrutinise and hold the Metropolitan Police Service to account. It requested additional training and a formal review of her performance after a year.

In May 2026, Comer-Schwartz refused to approve a proposed £50 million Metropolitan Police contract with Palantir. Metropolitan Police Commissioner Mark Rowley subsequently warned that blocking the contract would mean the loss of savings equivalent to 500 jobs, with the force later warning that up to 700 jobs could be affected.
