= Sophie Linden =

British politician (born 1970)

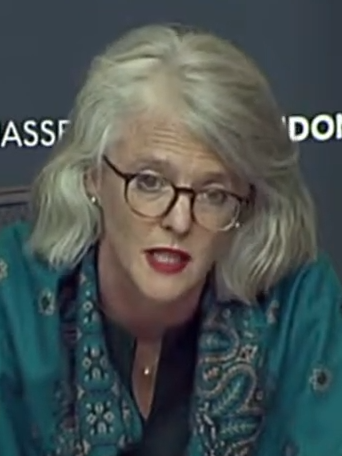
- Linden in 2021

Deputy Mayor of London for Policing and Crime
- In office 9 May 2016 – 7 October 2024
- Mayor: Sadiq Khan
- Commissioner: Bernard Hogan Howe; Cressida Dick; Stephen House (Acting); Mark Rowley
- Preceded by: Stephen Greenhalgh
- Succeeded by: Kaya Comer-Schwartz

Personal details
- Born: 27 February 1970 (age 56)
- Party: Labour
- Education: Emmanuel College, Cambridge
- Alma mater: Emmanuel College
- Profession: Politician

Sophie Linden (born 27 February 1970) is a British politician, who is currently a senior advisor to Home Secretary Shabana Mahmood. Linden was previously Deputy Mayor for Policing and Crime in London from 2016 until 2024. She is a member of the Labour Party.

== Education ==
Linden was educated at Emmanuel College, Cambridge from 1989 to 1992.

== Political career ==
Linden's entire career has been spent in politics. From 1992 to 1997, she was a researcher for David Blunkett MP. Following the Labour victory at the 1997 general election, she became a Special Adviser to Blunkett when he was Secretary of State for Education and Employment. She was in the role from 1997 to 2001, following Blunkett as Special Adviser when he was appointed Home Secretary.

Linden moved to become a Labour councillor within the London Borough of Hackney, for the Dalston Ward; she was elected at the 2006 Hackney London Borough Council election and re-elected in 2010 and 2014, before resigning on 10 June 2016. During this period, she worked for Bell Pottinger political communications, and unsuccessfully sought selection as Labour's Prospective parliamentary candidate for Hampstead and Kilburn prior to the 2015 general election. In 2016, she was appointed by the new Mayor of London Sadiq Khan to be the Deputy Mayor for Policing and Crime.

On 7 October 2024, Linden resigned as Deputy Mayor to become a senior adviser to Lord Chancellor and Secretary of State for Justice Shabana Mahmood. She was replaced by leader of Islington London Borough Council Kaya Comer-Schwartz.
