= Metropolitan Police Authority =

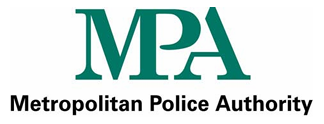
- Successor: Mayor's Office for Policing and Crime
- Formation: 2000
- Dissolved: 2012
- Legal status: Police authority
- Region served: Metropolitan Police District
- Budget: £3.6 billion (2011–2012)

The Metropolitan Police Authority (MPA) (2000–2012) was the local police authority responsible for scrutinising and supporting the work of the Metropolitan Police Service, the police force for Greater London (excluding the City of London Police area).

== History ==
Previously, control of the Metropolitan Police had vested entirely in the Home Secretary.

The MPA was set up in 2000 as a functional body of the Greater London Authority, by the Greater London Authority Act 1999. The aim of the authority was to scrutinise the Metropolitan Police Service.

The MPA had a strategic role and was not responsible for the day-to-day delivery of policing – which continued to be the direct responsibility of the Commissioner of the Metropolitan Police. The MPA set and monitored the annual police budget and the Mayor of London set the budget of the MPA.

Its membership consisted of:

- London Assembly members, appointed by the Mayor of London in accordance with the political balance on the Assembly.
- magistrates
- independents

The MPAs ceased to exist on 16 January 2012, when its functions were transferred to the Mayor's Office for Policing and Crime (MOPAC).

== List of chairs ==
- Toby Harris (2000–2004)
- Len Duvall (2004–2008)
- Boris Johnson (2008-2010)
- Kit Malthouse (2010–2012)
