= List of nicknames of prime ministers of Australia =

This is a list of nicknames of prime ministers of Australia.

== List of nicknames ==
=== Edmund Barton ===
Full name: Edmund Barton

- Toby
- Toby Tosspot, coined by The Bulletin after a poem by George Colman. "Tosspot" is slang for a heavy drinker.

=== Alfred Deakin ===
Full name: Alfred Deakin

- Affable Alfred, due to his good-natured and courteous nature.

=== Chris Watson ===
Full name: John Christian Watson

=== George Reid ===
Full name: George Houston Reid

George Reid was dubbed 'Yes-No Reid' after a long speech in which he was unwilling to take a clear position on federation

- Yes-No Reid, in reference to a long speech in which he was unwilling to take a clear position on federation.

=== Andrew Fisher ===
Full name: Andrew Fisher

- Andy

=== Joseph Cook ===
Full name: Joseph Cook

- Joe

=== Billy Hughes ===
Full name: William Morris Hughes

- The Little Digger, in reference to his popularity among soldiers during World War I. "Digger" is slang for an Australian soldier and "Little" is used due to Hughes' short stature.
- The Rat, due to his defection from Labor and merging with the Liberals to form the Nationalist Party because of his support for conscription.
- Australia's Whizz Bang, or Australia's Whizz-Bang, used by soldiers.
- Little Czar, coined by Daniel Mannix due to Hughes' pro-conscription attitudes.

=== Stanley Bruce ===
Full name: Stanley Melbourne Bruce, 1st Viscount Bruce of Melbourne

=== James Scullin ===
Full name: James Henry Scullin

=== Joseph Lyons ===
Full name: Joseph Aloysius Lyons

- Honest Joe

=== Earle Page ===
Full name: Earle Christmas Grafton Page

=== Robert Menzies ===
Robert Menzies was given the nickname 'pig iron Bob' due to his role as Attorney-General during the 1938 Dalfram dispute

Full name: Robert Gordon Menzies

- Ming the Merciless. As the Clan Menzies was a prominent Scottish family, Menzies preferred, in vain, the Scottish pronunciation of his surname, "Ming-is". "The Merciless" derives from the Flash Gordon villain of the same name.
- Bob
- Pig iron Bob, in reference to his role as Attorney-General of Australia during the 1938 Dalfram dispute. The Lyons government decided to sell pig iron to Japan, which was then seen as a military threat. Dockworkers to refuse to load the iron on grounds it could be made into weaponry to attack the country. A lockout and strike dragged on for weeks and Menzies was given the nickname.

=== Arthur Fadden ===
Full name: Arthur William Fadden

- Artie

=== John Curtin ===
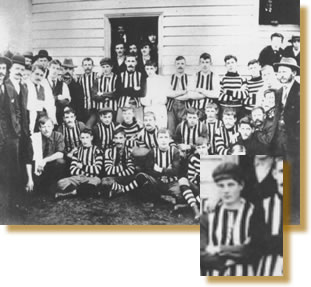
John Curtin was called 'Bumble' at Brunswick Football Club

Full name: John Joseph Ambrose Curtin

- Bumble, used by the citizens of Brunswick, including his teammates at Brunswick Football Club and Brunswick Cricket Club. According to some sources, he was given this nickname due to his propensity for debate at the cricket club but others attest that he was given this nickname when he first played for the football club from 1907 to 1909.

=== Frank Forde ===
Full name: Francis Michael Forde

=== Ben Chifley ===
Full name: Joseph Benedict Chifley

- Honest Ben
- Hamlet, used by his fellow parliamentarians because of his brooding way of walking through Parliament corridors when deep in thought.
- Granite, used by his staff due to his stubbornness.

=== Harold Holt ===
Full name: Harold Edward Holt

- Gunner Holt, due to his military position.

=== John McEwen ===
Full name: John McEwen

- Black Jack, in reference to his brooding and sombre personality.

=== John Gorton ===
Full name: John Grey Gorton

- Jolly John, in reference to his erratic personal behaviour.
- Gort the sport

=== William McMahon ===
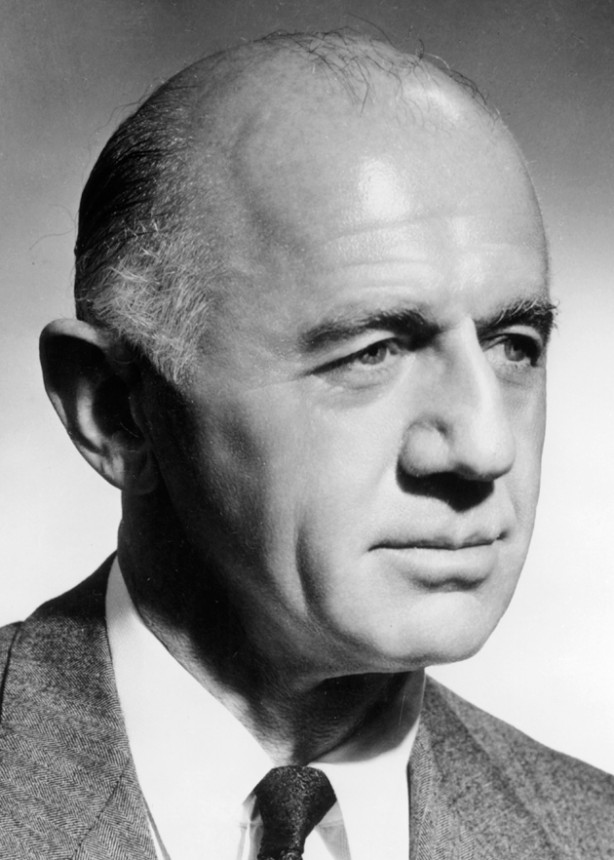
William McMahon was nicknamed 'Billy Big Ears' due to his large ears

Full name: William McMahon

- Billy the Leak
- Billy Liar
- Billy Big Ears, or Billy Big-Ears, due to his large ears.

=== Gough Whitlam ===
Full name: Edward Gough Whitlam

- The Young Brolga, in reference to his height and imperious personality.
- Goughie
- Gough the Toff
- The Great Gough

=== Malcolm Fraser ===
Full name: John Malcolm Fraser

- The Prefect, due to his industrious attitude and air of importance.
- Big Mal
- Charman Mal, due to his brusque style of leadership. The name is a reference to Mao Zedong, who was often known as "Chairman Mao".
- Freezer, a schoolboy nickname given to him due to his coldness.
- Frizzer, acquired due to a master at Melbourne Grammar School noting the clipped way that Fraser pronounced his surname.

=== Bob Hawke ===
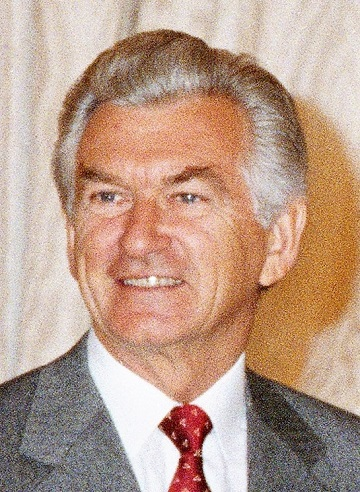
Bob Hawke was nicknamed 'the Silver Bodgie' due to the style and colour of his hair

Full name: Robert James Lee Hawke

- Hawkey or Hawkie (pronounced hawk-ee)
- The Silver Bodgie, as he styled his greying hair like a bodgie.
- Little Caesar
- Messiah
- Jellyback, or old jelly back, used by Minister for Finance Peter Walsh as he believed he wasn't tough enough.
- Old Silver, used by Keating and the opposition, referring to his hair colour.

=== Paul Keating ===
Paul Keating was dubbed 'the Lizard of Oz' after he guided Elizabeth II with a hand on her back

Full name: Paul John Keating

- The Mortician
- The Lizard of Oz, by the British press after he placed his arm around Queen Elizabeth during her 1992 tour of Australia.
- Paul-Bearer, a play on "pallbearer", in reference to his perceived role in the downturn of the Australian economy.
- The Undertaker, for the same reason as above.
- Captain Wacky

=== John Howard ===
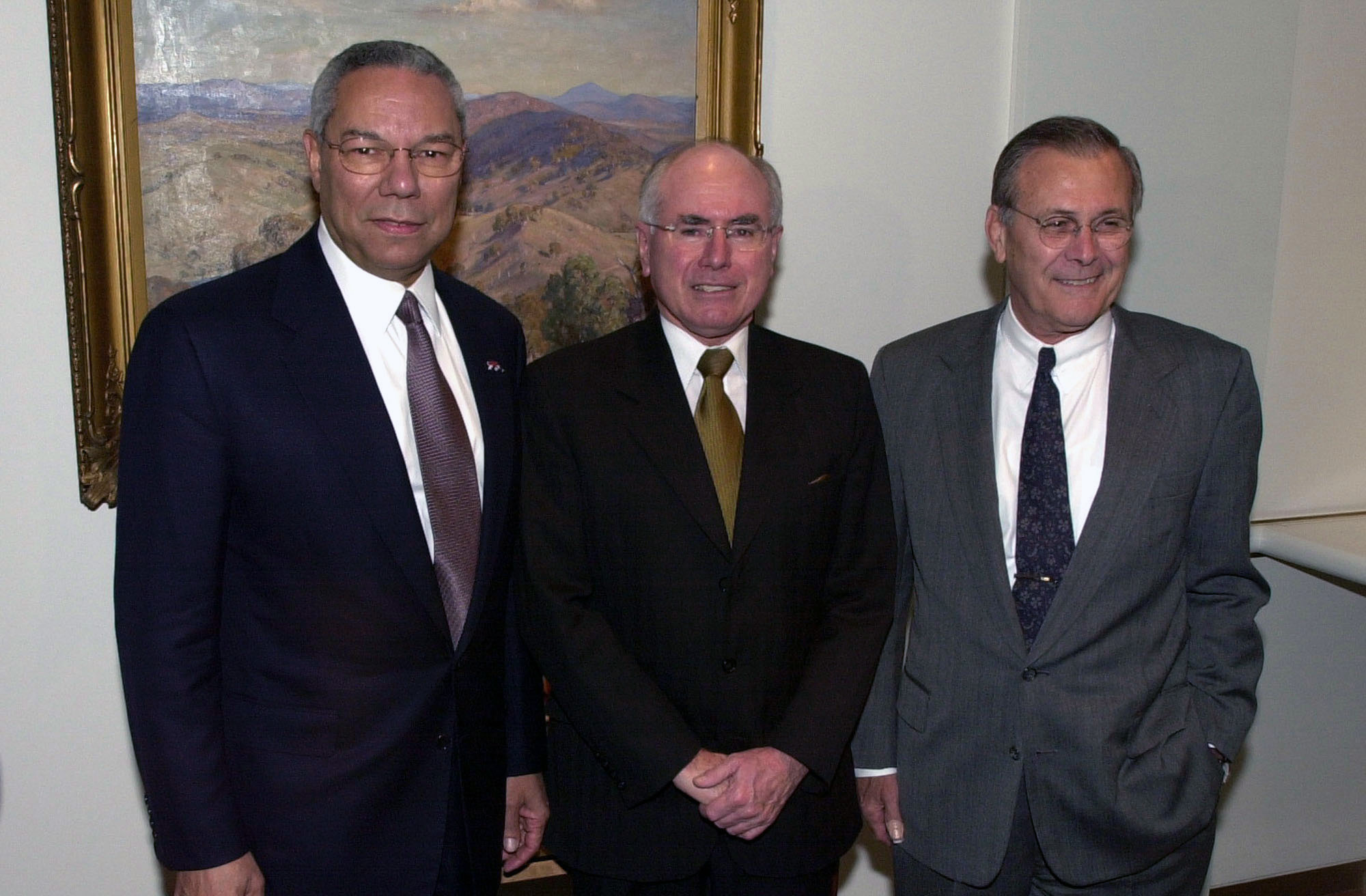
John Howard was nicknamed 'Little Johnny Howard' and 'the Prime Minitature' due to his height

Full name: John Winston Howard

- Honest John, used ironically. Coined after the 1978 budget, when Howard was treasurer, in which a number of election promises were broken.
- Little Johnny Howard, due to his stature.
- Mr 18%, for a 1988 Bulletin cover story of the same name, where inside, a poll had Howard at a preferred prime minister rating of 18% against Bob Hawke.
- The little desiccated coconut, used by Paul Keating to describe Howard during a 2007 radio interview.
- The Prime Miniature
- The Rodent
- The Unflushable Turd, used by Ian Fitchett and Mungo Wentworth MacCallum

=== Kevin Rudd ===
Full name: Kevin Michael Rudd

2007 portrait of Kevin Rudd

The "Milkybar Kid"

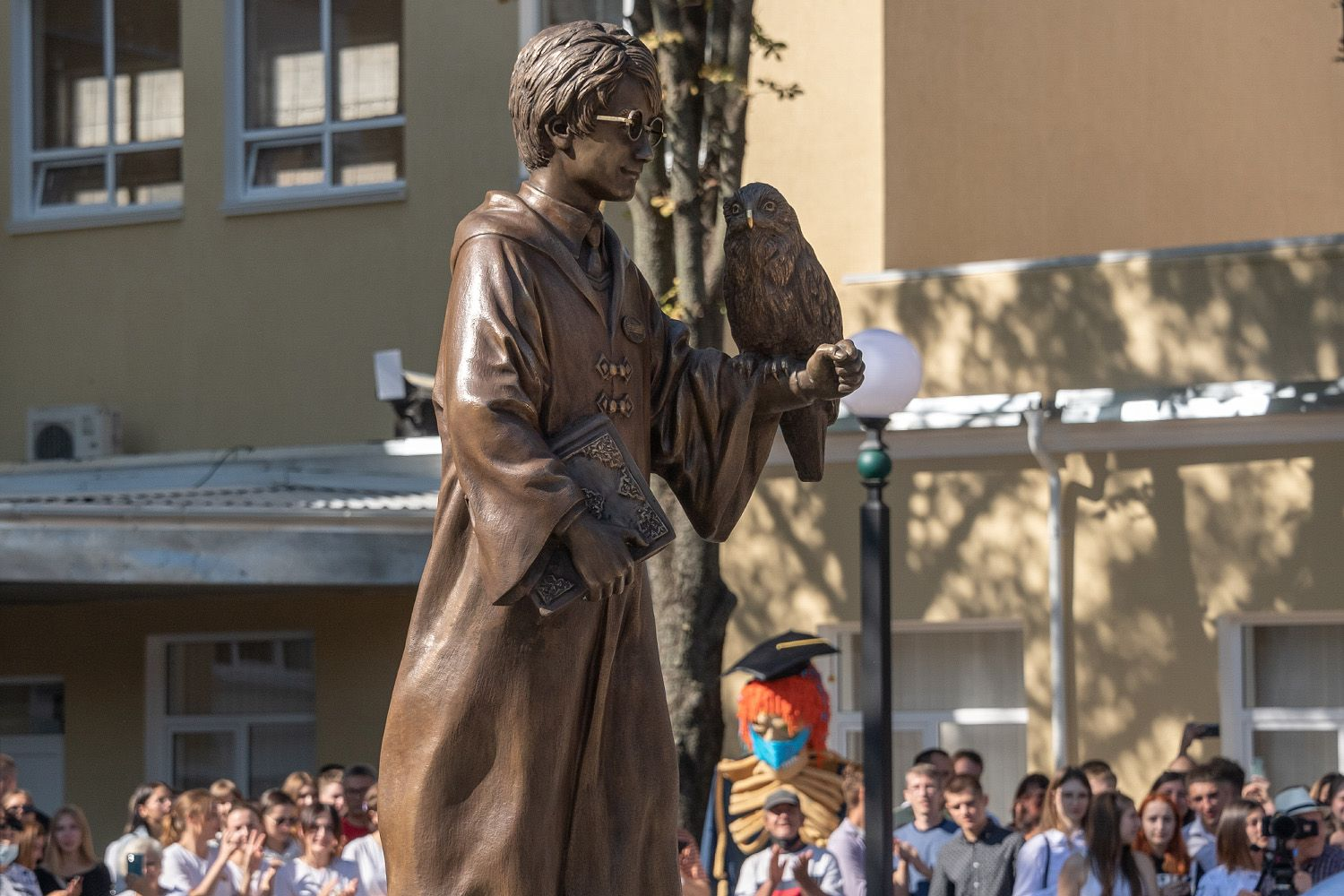
Statue of Harry Potter

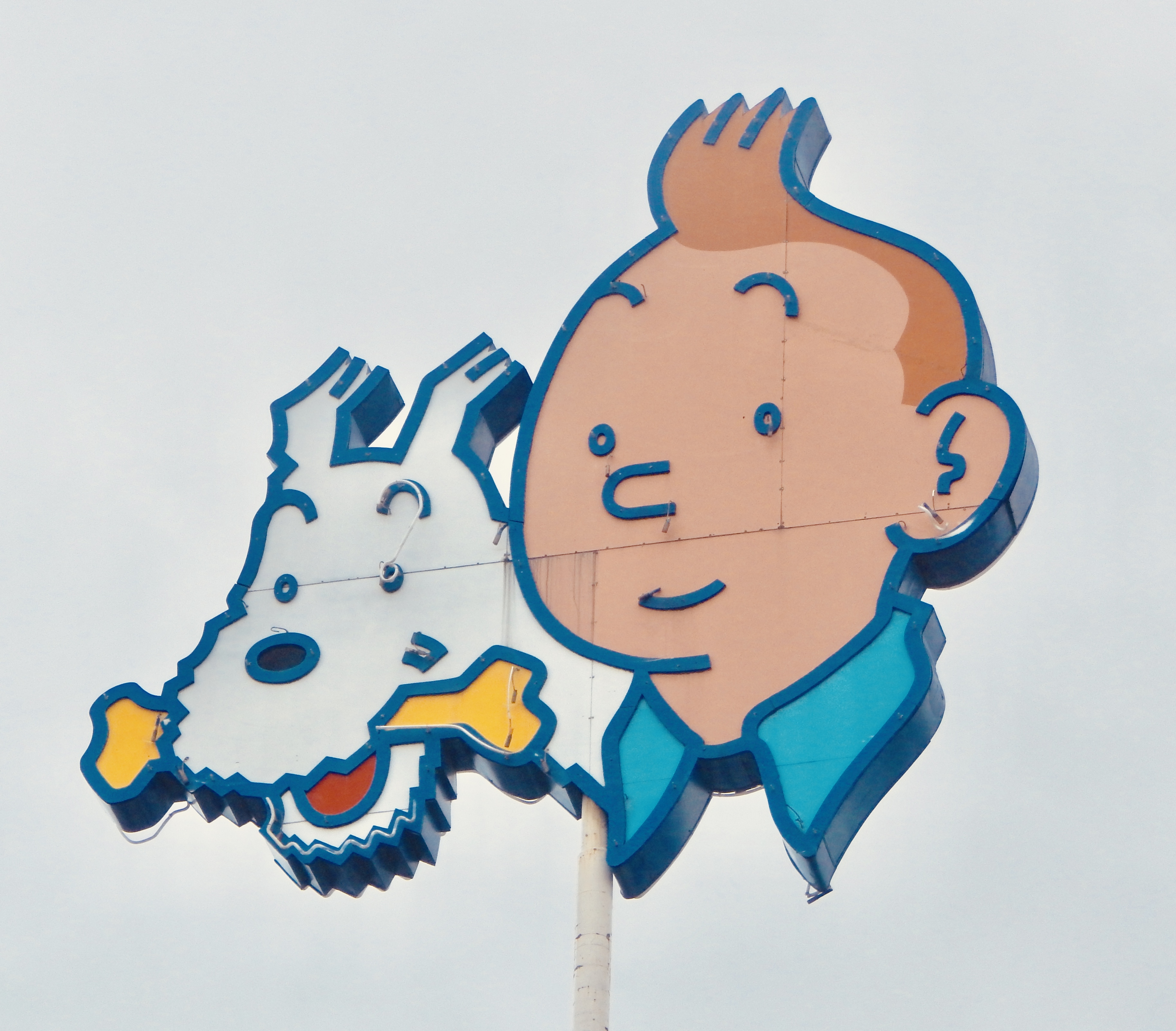
Billboard of Tintin

Kevin Rudd's appearance saw him likened to a number of characters

- Kevin07, his campaign slogan for the 2007 federal election.
- Kevin 24/7
- KRudd, K-Rudd or Krudd, a contraction of his name.
- Milky Bar Kid, due to his resemblance to the Nestlé mascot.
- Rudd the Dud, due to his surname rhyming with the word.
- Dr Death, in reference to his role in the cuts to the Queensland public service under the government of Wayne Goss.
- God Botherer
- Harry Potter, due to his resemblance.
- Pixie
- The Professor of Foreign Policy
- Heavy Kevvie
- Tintin, due to his resemblance.
- St. Kevin, due to his Christian faith.

=== Julia Gillard ===
Full name: Julia Eileen Gillard

- Ju-liar, part of a campaign of character assassination led by Alan Jones centred on a perceived "broken promise" regarding the introduction of the Clean Energy Act 2011 after Gillard emphasised there would be no carbon tax under her government.
- J-Gizza, used predominantly by students and young people during her prime ministership.
- The Witch, a misogynistic sobriquet which appeared on a placard at an anti-carbon tax rally attended by Tony Abbott.

=== Tony Abbott ===
Full name: Anthony John Abbott

- Mad monk, due to his time training as a priest and his aggressive approach as Leader of the Opposition.
- Captain Catholic

Tony Abbott was nicknamed 'onion muncher' after biting into a raw onion

- Tear-down Tony, due to his aggressive approach as Leader of the Opposition.
- Onion muncher, in response to a widely-circulated video in which Abbott bit into a raw onion while visiting a produce farm in northern Tasmania.
- The Gammon Man, by Indigenous people in the Northern Territory. The term is used to refer to individuals who are perceived as disingenuous or two-faced. It was applied to Abbott after he suggested that he would suspend financial assistance to remote Indigenous communities, and in response to his support for the closure of Aboriginal townships in Western Australia.

=== Malcolm Turnbull ===
Full name: Malcolm Bligh Turnbull

- Mr Harbourside Mansion
- Turncoat
- Trumble or Mr Trumble, owing to a gaffe by Donald Trump's first press secretary, Sean Spicer.
- Brian Trumbull, another misspelling which appeared in a Reuters article during Turnbull's 2017 visit to the United States.
- President of Australia, the title given to Turnbull in a White House press statement following a phone call with Donald Trump.
- Malc
- Turbo, given to him during his time at Goldman Sachs, used when being "powerful and dynamic."
- Turdball, given to him during his time at Goldman Sachs, used when being "high-handed."
- The Member for Net Worth, due to his position as Member for Wentworth and his wealthy status.

=== Scott Morrison ===
Full name: Scott John Morrison

- ScoMo
- Scummo
- The Liar from the Shire
- Scotty from Marketing became a common nickname due to Morrison's perceived poor response to the 2019 Australian bushfires. It originated in an article on satirical web site The Betoota Advocate during the bushfires. The name is still used frequently, and refers to Morrison's previous roles as managing director of Tourism Australia from 2004 to 2006 and as the inaugural Director of the New Zealand Office of Tourism and Sport from 1998 to 2000.

=== Anthony Albanese ===
Full name: Anthony Norman Albanese

- Albo
- Airbus Albo, used by critics, particularly Sky News Australia (News24), to criticise his perceived propensity for overseas travel.

== See also ==
- List of nicknames of prime ministers of Italy
- List of nicknames of prime ministers of the United Kingdom
- List of nicknames of presidents of the United States
