= Special K (disambiguation) =

Special K is a breakfast cereal manufactured by Kellogg Company.

Special K may also refer to:

== People ==
Stagenamed

- Special K (rapper), a rapper and original member of the Treacherous Three

Nicknamed

- Kell Brook, boxer
- Kevin Daley (basketball), basketball player
- Karmichael Hunt, rugby league footballer
- Greg Kelser, American basketball player and color commentator
- Alan Kulwicki, American race car driver
- Thanasi Kokkinakis, tennis player
- Keir Starmer, British prime minister (see List of nicknames of prime ministers of the United Kingdom#Keir Starmer)

== Art, entertainment, and media ==
- "Special K" (song), a song by the rock band Placebo
- Special K: The Wisdom of Terry Kay, a 2000 book by Terry Kay
- Special K, an application for improving the performance of computer games

== Other uses ==
- Special K, a nickname for the drug ketamine
- Special Kay, the last airworthy Douglas B-26K Invader owned and being restored by the Pacific Prowler organization in Fort Worth, Texas
