= Pig wrestling =

Contest where competitors try to grab a pig

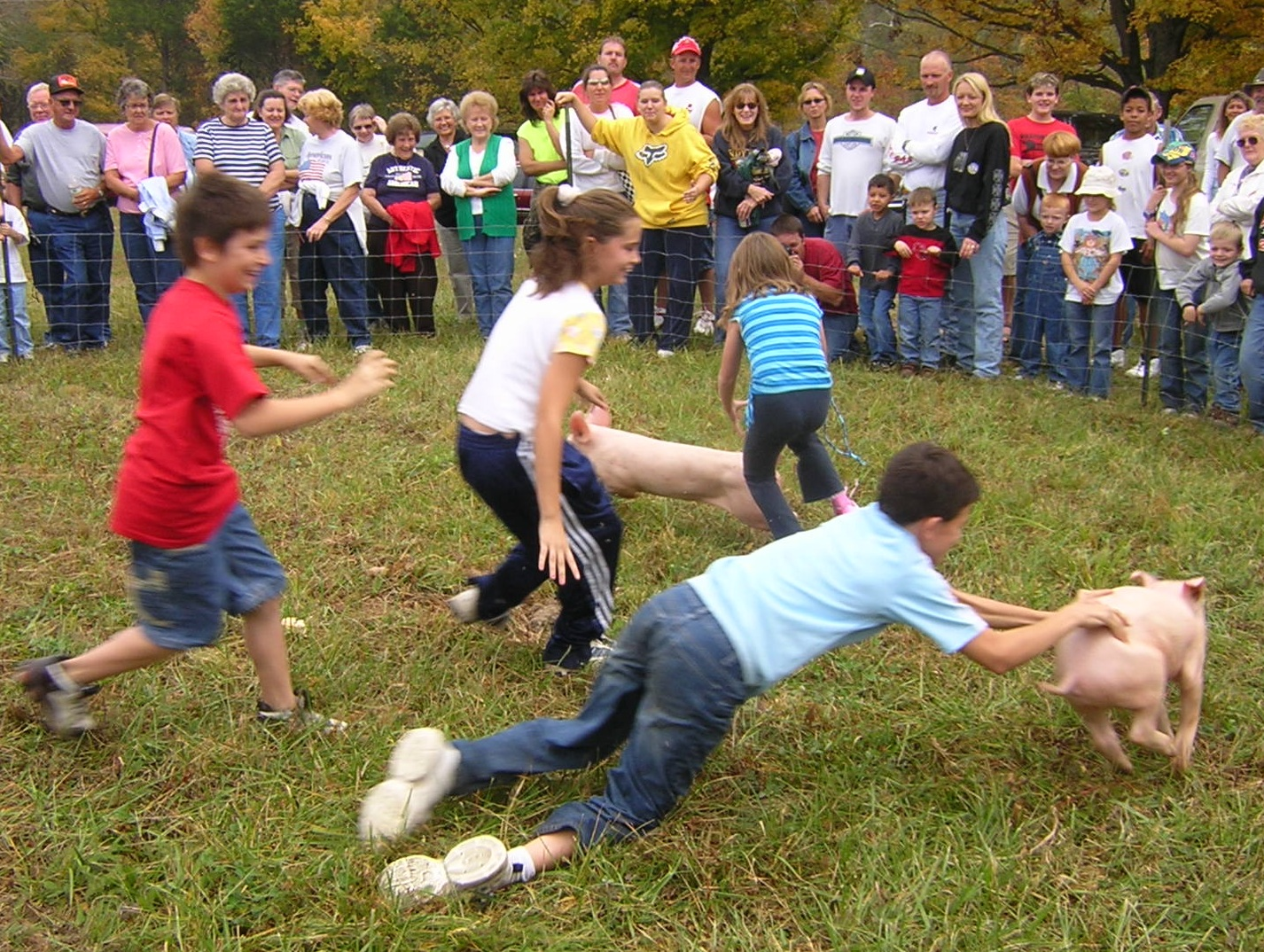
Greased pig contest, Houston

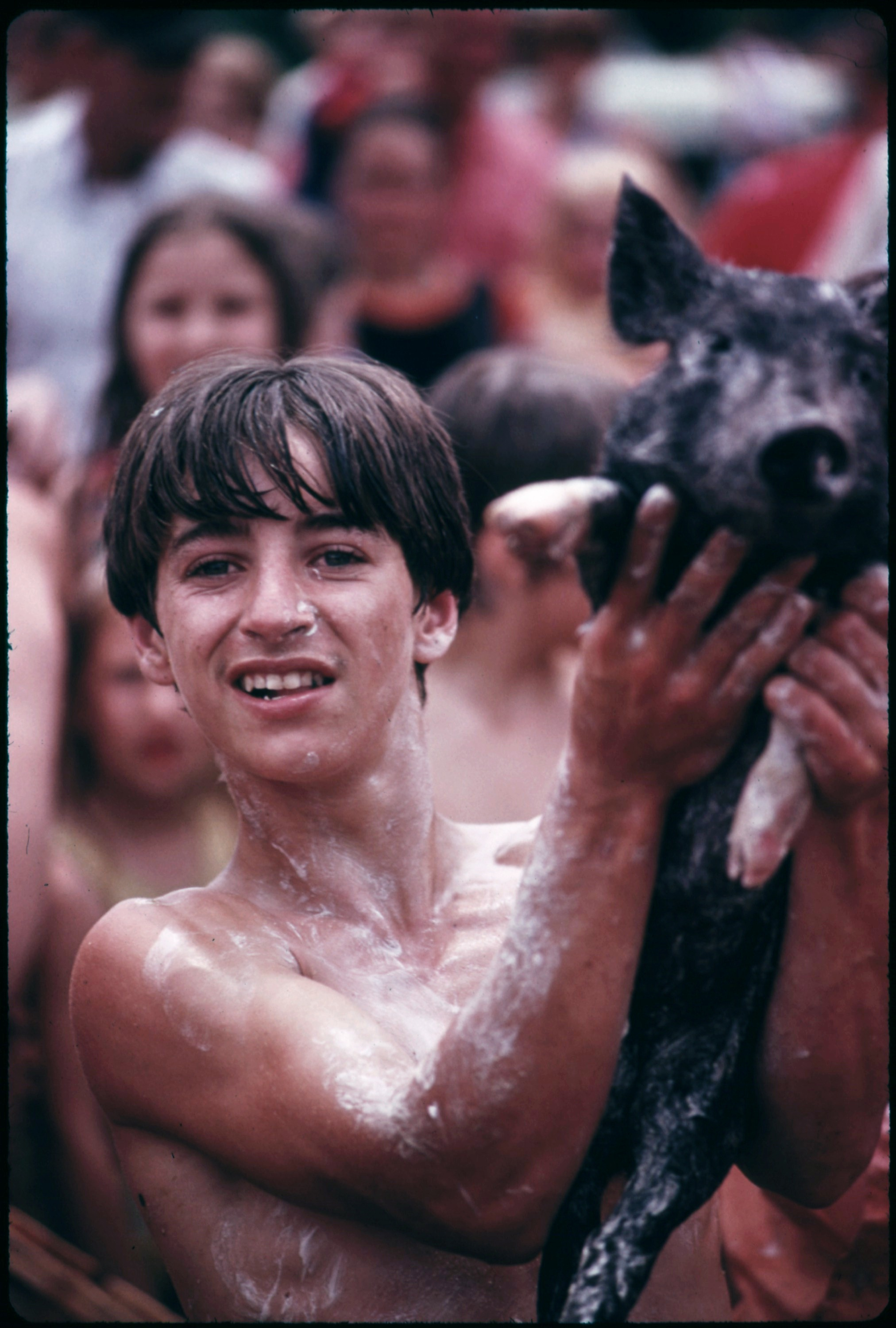
A boy holding a greased pig

Pig wrestling (also known as pig scramble and with the variants hog wrestling and greased pig catching) is a game sometimes played at agricultural shows such as state and county fairs, in which contestants, try to hold onto a pig. In the most common version, a team of four members chases a domestic pig around a fenced-off mud pit and attempts to place it in a barrel, in a race against the clock. In some events the pigs are greased with lard (pig fat), vegetable or mineral oil in order to make catching the pig even more difficult.

== Rules ==
Rules vary depending on the venue. Some contests use larger pigs, while others use those that are smaller. Some include a single pig, while others use more than one. The pigs are coated with shortening, vegetable oil, lard, or another lubricant. Contestants chase the pigs around a field or other determined area. Depending on the contest, contestants either try to get one or both hands on the pig, tackle and hold the pig down, or drag the pig to a set point. There may be several rounds per contest. The prize for winning is often the pig itself.

Children too young to compete in pig wrestling may compete in a greased pig chase, the object of which is to hang onto a greased pig for a certain amount of time. The size of the pigs or piglets is commonly matched to the size of the children, teens or adults in the contest.

== Animal welfare ==
Concerns have been raised by animal rights organizations that using pigs in this form of entertainment is inhumane, since the pigs have no choice in the matter of whether they want to wrestle or not. The wrestling may impose undue emotional stress on the pigs, as evidenced by fearful squealing, and causes physical torsional stress on the pigs' joints. Some fairs have thus eliminated pig wrestling from their events. In Minnesota, pig wrestling is a misdemeanor.

== In popular culture ==
In 2019, the former British prime minister David Cameron famously referred to the then prime minister Boris Johnson as "the greased piglet" in talking about Johnson's chances of getting Brexit legislation passed through parliament, saying "The thing about the greased piglet is that he manages to slip through other people’s hands where mere mortals fail". In May 2022, the Indian author Pankaj Mishra described the perception of Johnson as "a great survivor, a 'greased piglet,'" as a myth, and argued that in reality "Johnson’s survival skills amount to little more than shamelessness." In June 2022, former Liberal Democrat leader Vince Cable, referring to Johnson's success in a confidence vote, wrote: "The greased piglet has escaped from his tormentors again ... He may end up as someone’s pork sausage, but not for a while."

== See also ==
- Pig racing
