= Public image of Boris Johnson =

Public perceptions of British politician

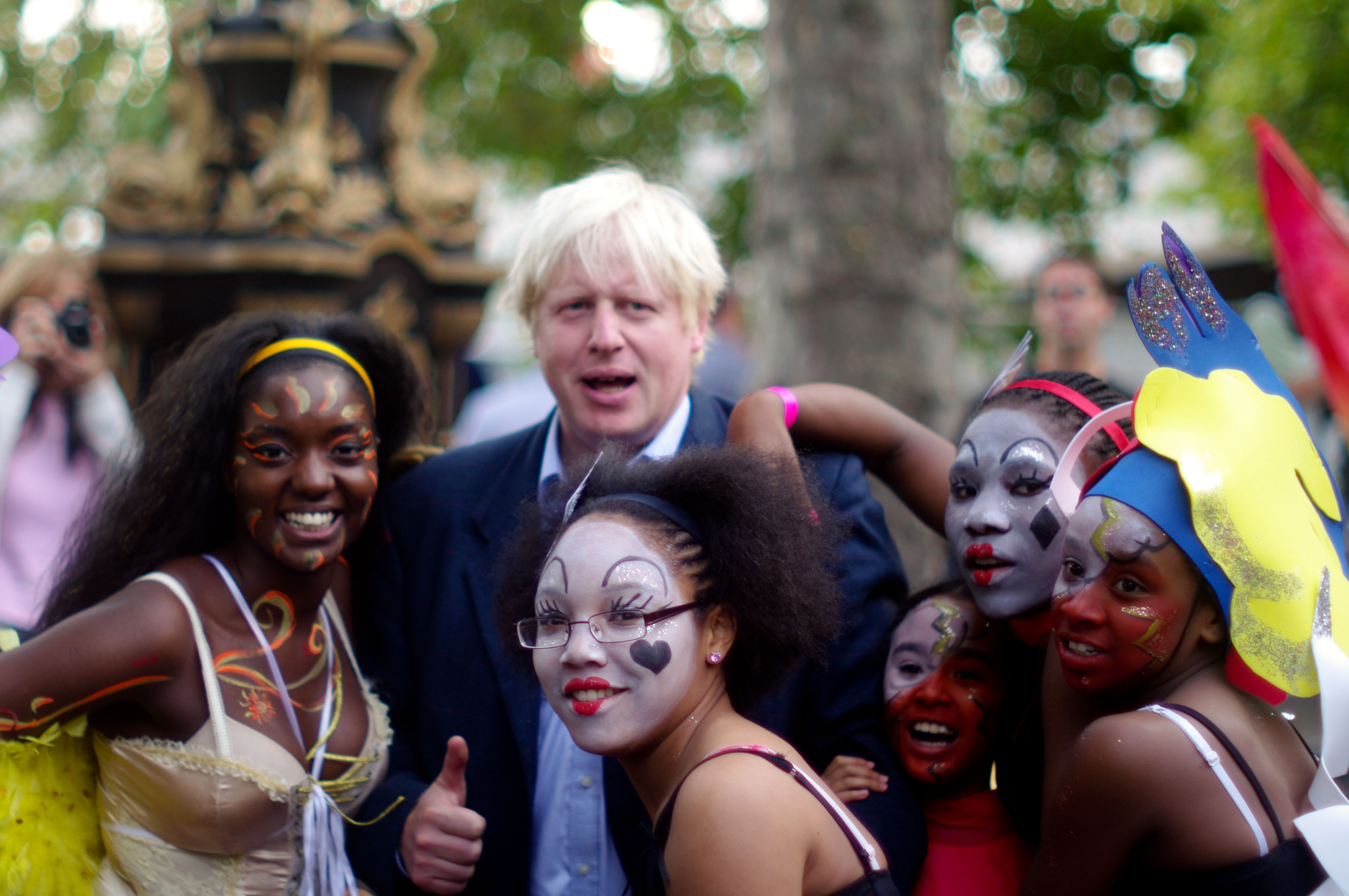
Boris Johnson at the 2008 Mayor Thames Festival during his tenure as Mayor of London

Boris Johnson has attracted commentary throughout his political career. As Mayor of London, Prime Minister of the United Kingdom, and in various ministerial positions, Johnson has been considered a controversial or polarising figure in British politics.

Unique aspects of Johnson's image have included his perceived comedic or humorous persona and semi-shambolic appearance. Johnson's supporters have praised him for "getting Brexit done", overseeing the UK's vaccine rollout against COVID-19, as well as providing global leadership following the Russian invasion of Ukraine; conversely, his critics have accused him of lying, elitism and cronyism, with his final months in office mired in a series of scandals.

Johnson's political positions have been described as following one-nation conservatism, whilst political commentators have characterised his political style as being both populist and pragmatic. Johnson's political positions have changed throughout his political career.

== Personal image ==
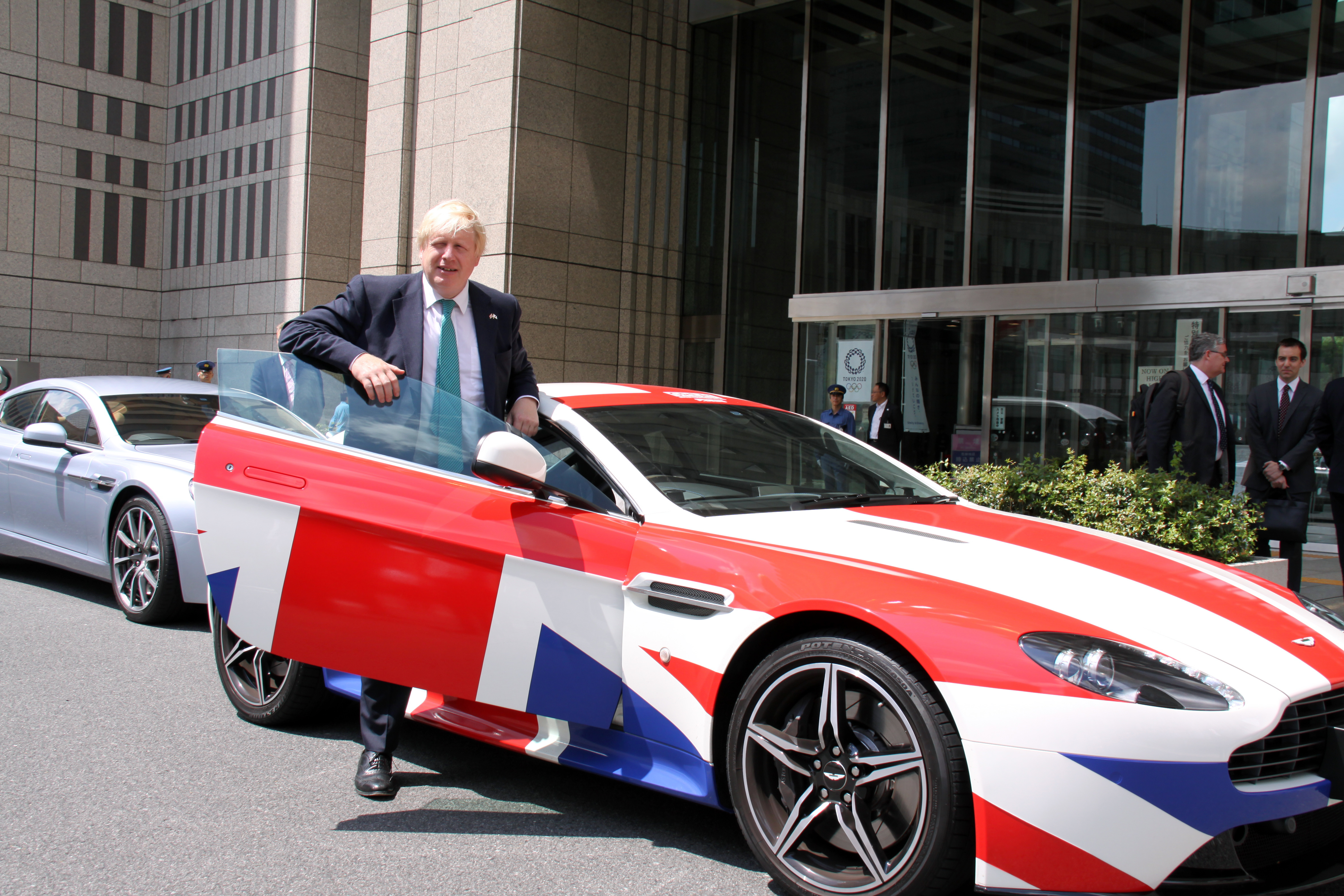
Johnson posing with an Aston Martin painted with the Union Flag in 2017

Often known simply as Boris, Johnson has attracted a variety of nicknames, including "BoJo", a portmanteau of his forename and surname. Biographer Sonia Purnell described his public persona as "brand Boris", noting he developed it while at the University of Oxford.

Max Hastings referred to Johnson's public image as a "façade resembling that of P. G. Wodehouse's Gussie Fink-Nottle, allied to wit, charm, brilliance and startling flashes of instability", while political scientist Andrew Crines stated Johnson displayed "the character of a likable and trustworthy individual with strong intellectual capital". Private Eye editor Ian Hislop has defined him as "Beano Boris" due to his perceived comical nature, saying: "He's our Berlusconi ... He's the only feel-good politician we have, everyone else is too busy being responsible." To the journalist Dave Hill, Johnson was "a unique figure in British politics, an unprecedented blend of comedian, conman, faux subversive showman and populist media confection".

Johnson purposely cultivates a "semi-shambolic look", for instance, by specifically ruffling his hair in a certain way when he makes public appearances. Purnell described him as "a manic self-promoter" who has filled his life with "fun and jokes". Described by Crines as "a joker", Johnson has said that "humour is a utensil that you can use to sugar the pill and to get important points across". Purnell wrote colleagues regularly expressed the view that Johnson used people to advance his own interests, and Gimson wrote that Johnson was "one of the great flatterers of our times". Purnell commented he deflected serious questions using "a little humour and a good deal of bravado". According to Gimson, Johnson was "a humane man" who "could also be staggeringly inconsiderate of others" when pursuing his own interests. Gimson added Johnson has "an excessive desire to be liked".

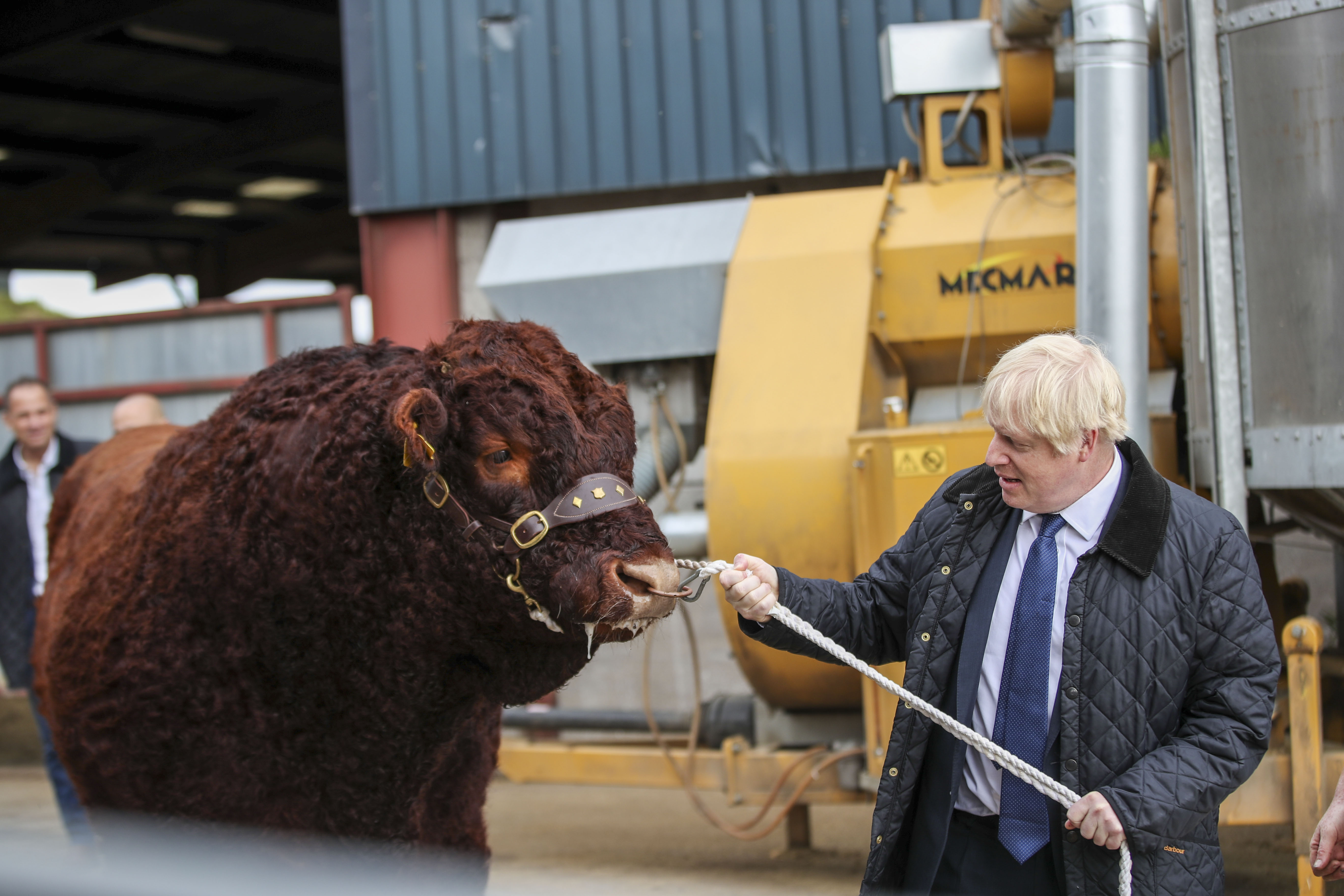
Johnson visiting a cow farm in Aberdeen in 2019

Biographer Sonia Purnell wrote in 2011:

Boris is an original—the opposite of a stereotype, the exception to the rule. Overweight and goosey-fleshed, he's the antithesis of an airbrushed pin-up. He resembles a 'human laundry-basket' and has a habit of forgetting to shower. He is blessed with immense charisma, wit, sex appeal and celebrity gold dust; he is also recognised and loved by millions—although perhaps less so by many who have had to work closely with him (let alone depend on him). Resourceful, cunning and strategic, he can pull off serious political coups when the greater good happens to coincide with his personal advantage but these aspirations are rarely backed up by concrete achievements, or even detailed plans.

Gimson stated Johnson "has very bad manners. He tends to be late, does not care about being late, and dresses without much care". Highly ambitious and very competitive, Johnson was, Gimson wrote, born "to wage a ceaseless struggle for supremacy". He would be angered with those he thought insulted aspects of his personal life; for instance, when an article in The Telegraph upset Johnson, he emailed commissioning editor Sam Leith with the simple message: "Fuck off and die." Thus, according to Purnell, Johnson hides his ruthlessness "using bumbling, self-deprecation or humour", and was a fan of "laddish banter and crude sexual references".

== Political image ==
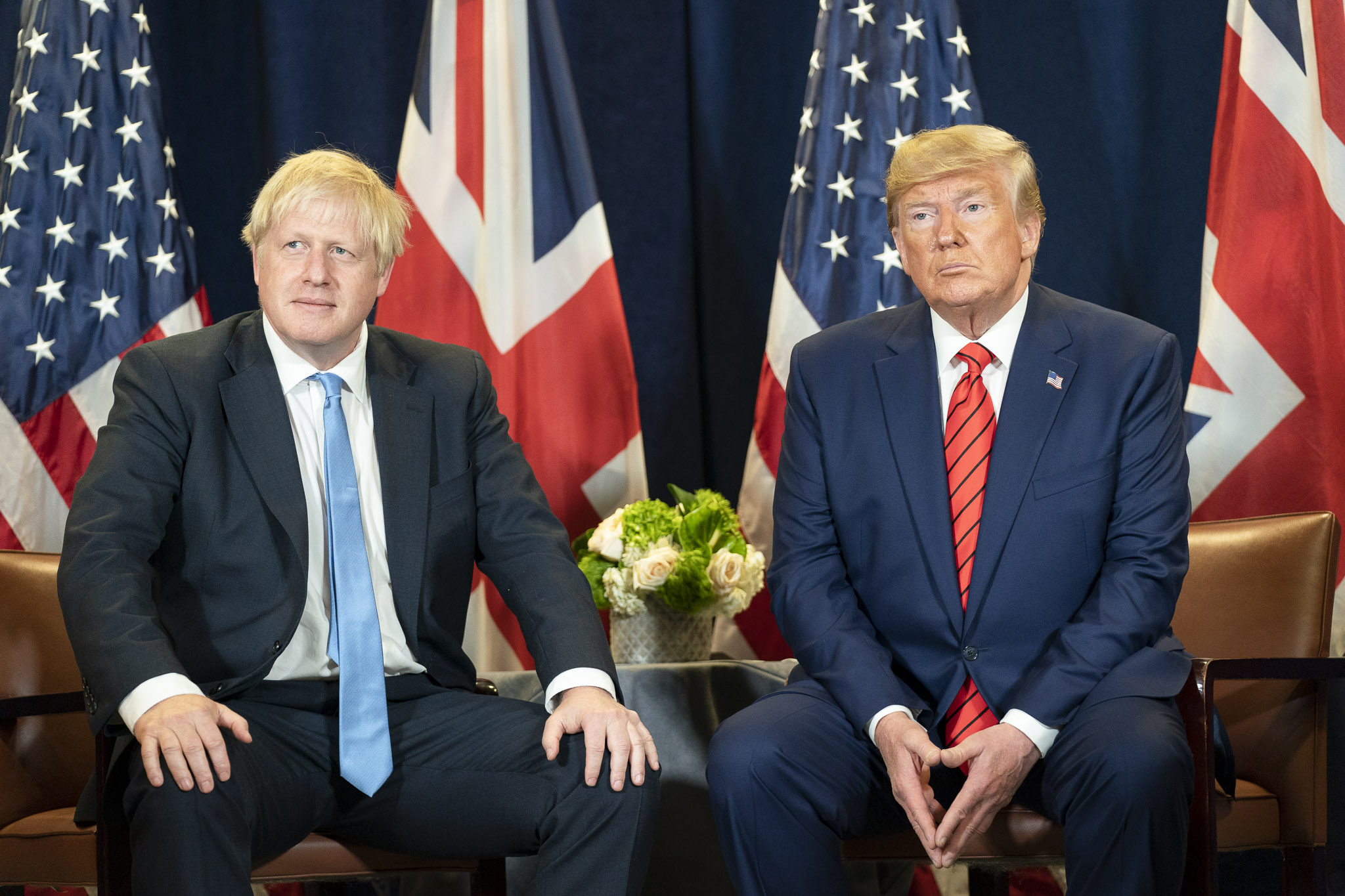
Johnson with US President Donald Trump at the 2019 United Nations General Assembly

Johnson has been described as a divisive and controversial figure in British politics. Purnell recognised that during the 2008 London mayoral election, he was "polarising opinions to the extreme", with critics viewing him as "variously evil, a clown, a racist and a bigot". Writing in The Guardian, journalist Polly Toynbee referred to him as a "jester, toff, self-absorbed sociopath and serial liar", while Labour politician Hazel Blears called him "a nasty right-wing elitist, with odious views and criminal friends". He was accused of sexism and homophobia by social media users and members of the LGBT community after referring to Labour leader Jeremy Corbyn as "a big girl's blouse" and former prime minister David Cameron as a "girly swot". Cameron has said of Johnson: "The thing about the greased piglet is that he manages to slip through other people's hands where mere mortals fail."

Some commentators have noted his appeal beyond traditional Conservative voters. In 2011, Purnell described Johnson as "the most unconventional, yet compelling politician of the post-Blair era" and that he was "beloved by millions and recognised by all". Giles Edwards and Jonathan Isaby commented Johnson appealed to "a broad cross-section of the public", with his friends characterising him as a "Heineken Tory" who can appeal to voters that other Conservatives cannot (a reference to the Heineken beer advertisement). Gimson expressed the view that "people love him because he makes them laugh", noting that he had become "the darling of the Tory rank and file".

In 2018, The Economist described Johnson as "the most irresponsible politician the country has seen for many years". In 2019, The Irish Times described him as "a deeply polarising figure, cherished by many older Conservatives but viewed by others as a serial liar and an amoral opportunist who sold Brexit to the British people on the basis of false promises". In 2019, Johnson's former boss at The Daily Telegraph Max Hastings described him as "a brilliant entertainer", but accused him of "[caring] for no interest save his own fame and gratification", criticised his leadership abilities and described him as "unfit for national office". Laura Kuenssberg wrote in December 2021 that public perceptions of Johnson had been damaged by a series of controversies related to Westminster Christmas parties during the COVID-19 pandemic, Owen Paterson, and a Downing Street refurbishment. The former Speaker of the House of Commons, John Bercow, appearing in a Sky News programme, "The Great Debate", described Johnson as "ritually dishonest" and the worst of the twelve prime ministers he had known, with no redeeming features.

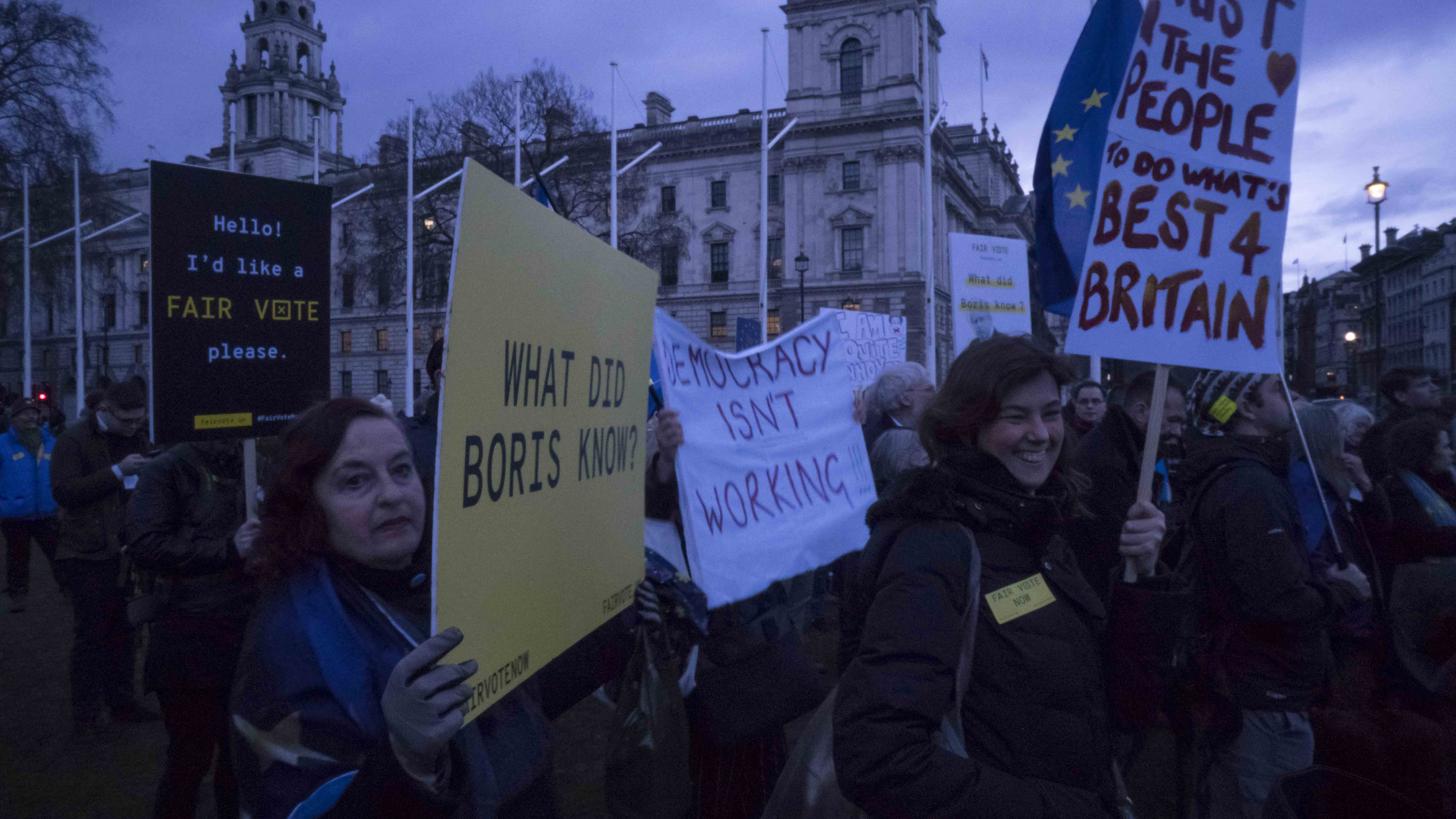
A protest following the Cambridge Analytica scandal, 29 March 2018

From 2016, Johnson evoked comparisons (both ideological and physical) with United States President Donald Trump. In June 2016, former Liberal Democrat leader Nick Clegg described him as "like Donald Trump with a thesaurus", while fellow Conservative MP Kenneth Clarke described him as a "nicer Donald Trump". Trump acknowledged the comparison, claiming that British people refer to Johnson as "Britain Trump". Johnson was critical of Trump on several occasions before Trump's election; he praised Trump as president, but disagreed with some of his policies. Comparisons have also been made between Johnson and Italian Prime Minister Silvio Berlusconi, owing to numerous scandals, similar public images and their informal communications styles.

Johnson's leadership has been viewed as the most scandalous of modern times by historians and biographers, with Andrew Gimson, Anthony Seldon and Tim Bale saying that there had not been such a scandalous prime minister since David Lloyd George in terms of scandal, controversy, and indifference to the rules of public life. Seldon noted Johnson's historic "lack of respect for convention and the constitution", while political historian Steven Fielding noted that, while Johnson's personal life was often aired out more publicly than past prime ministers' due to increased scrutiny since the Profumo affair, "the alacrity with which [Johnson] broke rules and conventions and norms that have defined British politics in the postwar period, that is something that is unique", noting that Johnson's behaviour in public office may have set a new low for other prime ministers to emulate.

=== Veracity of statements ===
Johnson has been accused of lying or making untruthful or misleading statements throughout his career. BBC News described this as a strategy to "bamboozle the listener with a blizzard of verbiage", and a 2021 analysis in The Atlantic suggested Johnson's communication style was a honed political skill that contributed to his popularity. In 2019, The Independent listed his "most notorious untruths", which included fabricating a quotation whilst at The Times for which he was sacked, creating Euromyths while working for The Daily Telegraph in Brussels, misrepresenting events during the Hillsborough disaster while the editor of The Spectator, lying to Conservative leader Michael Howard about his extramarital affair, and promising that leaving the EU would provide £350 million per week for the NHS. The Guardian noted that Johnson "almost never corrects the record in the chamber" and that while Johnson's spokespeople insist he does follow the Ministerial Code of which honesty is part, "No 10 will sometimes acknowledge that an error was made, but more usually brushes aside the complaint or argues that Johnson was misunderstood".

Writing in The Times Literary Supplement, the scholar and former politician Rory Stewart said: "Johnson is the most accomplished liar in public life. Perhaps the best liar ever to serve as prime minister. He has mastered the use of error, omission, exaggeration, diminution, equivocation and flat denial. He has perfected casuistry, circumlocution, false equivalence and false analogy. He is equally adept at the ironic jest, the fib and the grand lie; the weasel word and half-truth; the hyperbolic lie, the obvious lie and the bullshit lie." In 2021, the political journalist and author Peter Oborne published a book about the lies told by Johnson, in which he wrote, "I have never encountered a senior British politician who lies and fabricates so regularly, so shamelessly and so systematically as Boris Johnson". Contemporaneous opposition MPs Dawn Butler (of the Labour Party) and Ian Blackford (of the Scottish National Party) have both openly called Johnson a liar in the House of Commons. Laura Kuenssberg, political editor for BBC News, noted that it was "rare for opposition parties to accuse a prime minister, on the record, of lying". In January 2022, Labour leader Keir Starmer accused Johnson of lying about a Downing Street party during lockdown in May 2020. Speaking in the Commons on 31 January 2022, Johnson falsely accused Starmer of not prosecuting the serial sex offender Jimmy Savile when Starmer was Director of Public Prosecutions.

=== Allegations of racism and Islamophobia ===
In August 2018, The Daily Telegraph published a satirical article by Johnson criticising the then newly implemented Danish law against the wearing of Islamic face veils (i.e., the burqa or niqāb). In it, he defended the right of women to wear whatever they chose. He also agreed the burqa is oppressive and that "it is weird and bullying to expect women to cover their faces" and commented that he could "find no scriptural authority for the practice in the Koran". He stated that it seemed "absolutely ridiculous that people should choose to go around looking like letter boxes" and that "[i]f a female student turned up at school or at a university lecture looking like a bank robber", then he "should feel fully entitled—like Jack Straw—to ask her to remove it so that [he] could talk to her properly". The Muslim Council of Britain (MCB) accused Johnson of "pandering to the far-right", while Conservative peer Baroness Warsi accused him of dog-whistle politics. Several senior Conservatives, including then prime minister Theresa May, called on Johnson to apologise. Others, such as MP Nadine Dorries, argued that his comments did not go far enough and that face veils should be banned. A Sky News poll found 60% thought Johnson's comments were not racist, to 33% who did; 48% thought he should not apologise, while 45% thought he should. An independent panel was set up to review Johnson's comments. In December, the panel cleared him of wrongdoing, stating that while his language could be considered "provocative", he was "respectful and tolerant" and was fully entitled to use "satire" to make his point.

Writing for The Telegraph in 2002, Johnson referred to a visit by then prime minister Tony Blair: "What a relief it must be for Blair to get out of England. It is said that the Queen has come to love the Commonwealth, partly because it supplies her with regular cheering crowds of flag-waving piccaninnies." In the same article he referred to African people as having "watermelon smiles".

In his 2004 comic novel Seventy-Two Virgins, Johnson described the thoughts of a black parking inspector who had been subjected to racist abuse: "Faced with such disgusting behaviour, some traffic wardens respond with a merciless taciturnity. The louder the rant of the traffic offenders, the more acute are the wardens' feelings of pleasure that they, the stakeless, the outcasts, the niggers, are a valued part of the empire of law, and in a position to chastise the arrogance and selfishness of the indigenous people." In the same book, the narrator refers to the media being controlled by Jewish oligarchs.

In September 2019, Labour MP Tanmanjeet Singh Dhesi called on Johnson to apologise for the comments he had made about burqa-wearing Muslim women in The Telegraph. Johnson declined to apologise, stating that his remarks had come as part of a "strong liberal defence of everybody's right to wear whatever they want".

According to Dave Hill in The Guardian, Johnson's views on Islam have evolved. After the 2005 bombings, he questioned the loyalty of British Muslims and said Islamophobia was a "natural reaction". But by 2008, he blamed terrorism on a minority of Muslims who distort the Qur'an. And in 2009, he urged Britons to visit their local mosques and learn more about Islam.

== Ratings and polling ==
In April 2022, a poll by JLPartners found voters most frequently described the prime minister as a 'liar', followed by 'incompetent' and 'untrustworthy'. Only 16% of respondents described Johnson with positive language while over 70% used negative language.

== In popular culture ==
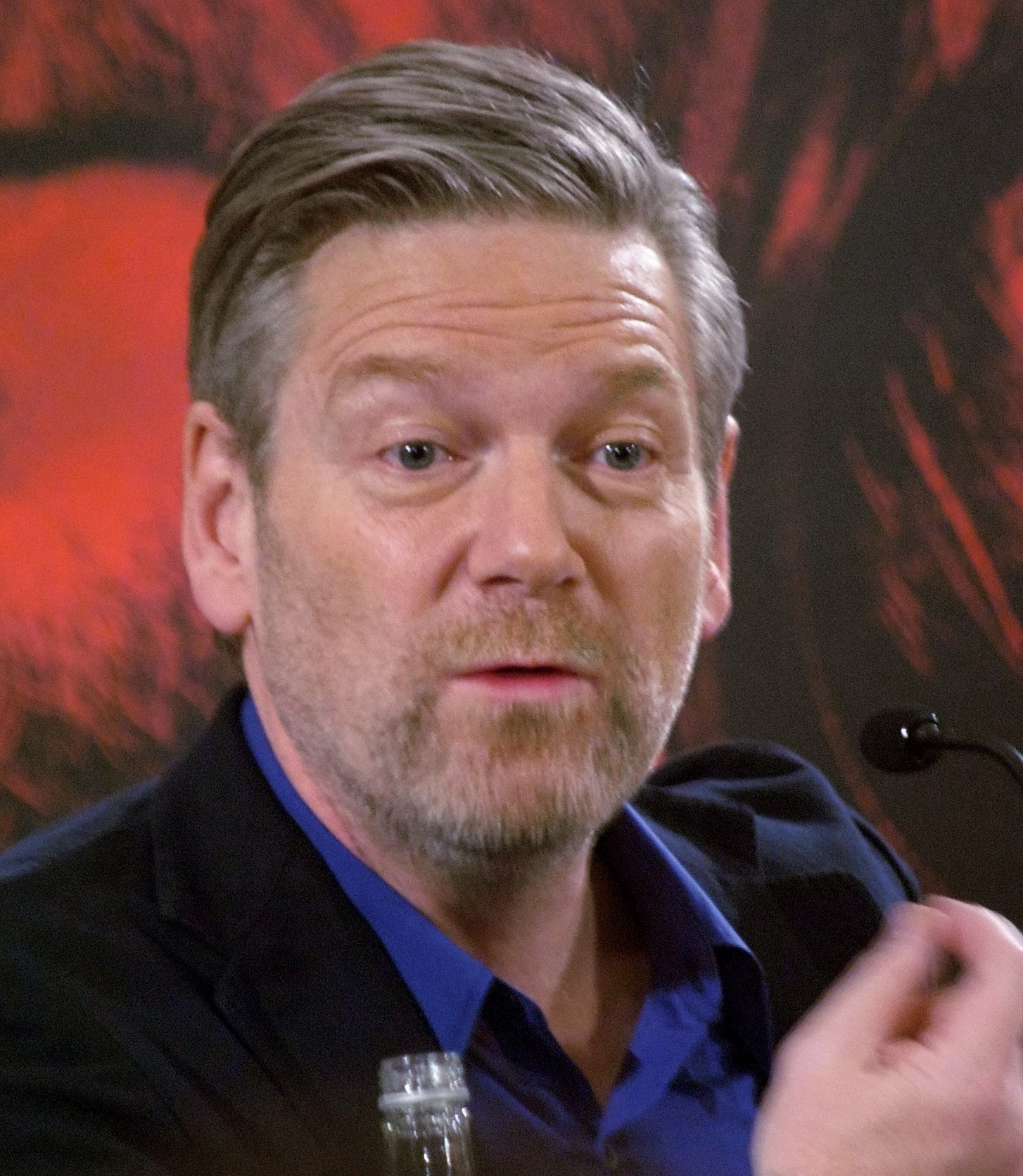
Johnson was portrayed by Kenneth Branagh in the 2022 Sky Atlantic drama This England.

The political career of Johnson has been the subject of several television docudramas:

- Stuart McQuarrie in the 2005 television film A Very Social Secretary
- Christian Brassington in the More4 drama documentary When Boris Met Dave
- Will Barton in the 2017 BBC-produced drama Theresa vs. Boris: How May Became PM
- Richard Goulding in the 2019 HBO and Channel 4 drama Brexit: The Uncivil War
- Kenneth Branagh in the 2022 Sky Atlantic drama This England

Johnson's bumbling mannerisms and distinctive hairstyle have also made him the subject of parody:

- In the 2008–2012 children's TV cartoon series Ben & Holly's Little Kingdom, the mayor of Fairy Town, voiced by Alexander Armstrong, is based on Johnson, who was mayor of London at the time
- Johnson is voiced by Lewis MacLeod in the fourth and fifth series of 2DTV
- MacLeod also voices Johnson in Newzoids
- Johnson is portrayed as a half man-half dog personage who would rather engage in acts of canine behaviour like chasing his tail than answering questions, in Headcases. He is voiced by Jon Culshaw
- The music video for Stormzy's "Vossi Bop" features backup dancers donning wigs similar to Boris's hairstyle and throwing them on the ground just as the line "fuck the government, fuck Boris" comes in
- In 2019, James Corden portrayed Johnson in a sketch on Saturday Night Live
- In the 2020 revival of Spitting Image, Johnson's puppet is voiced by Matt Forde

Johnson has been the subject of British music and music media:

- Singer Robbie Williams portrays Boris Johnson in the music video for his 2020 festive single "Can't Stop Christmas"
- Johnson was the focus of the 2020 song "Boris Johnson Is a Fucking Cunt" by Kunt and the Gang, which reached number five on the UK Singles Chart. He was also the focus of the single's follow-up, "Boris Johnson Is Still a Fucking Cunt", released in 2021

== See also ==
- Greased piglet
- Dead cat strategy
