= List of nicknames of presidents of the United States =

Presidents of the United States have often acquired nicknames, both flattering and unflattering. This list is intended to note those nicknames that were in common use at the time they were in office or shortly thereafter.

== George Washington ==
- The American Cincinnatus, like the famous Roman Lucius Quinctius Cincinnatus, he won a war, then became a private citizen instead of seeking power or riches as a reward. He became the first president general of the Society of the Cincinnati, formed by Revolutionary War officers who also "declined offers of power and position to return to his home and plough".
- The American Fabius, for his Fabian military strategy during the Revolutionary War
- Conotocaurius, or Town Destroyer, given by the Seneca chief Tanacharison.
- The Father of His Country (Note: He has gained fame around the world as a quintessential example of a benevolent national founder. Gordon Wood concludes that the greatest act in his life was his resignation as commander of the armies—an act that stunned aristocratic Europe. The earliest known image in which Washington is identified as such is on the cover of the circa 1778 Pennsylvania German almanac (Lancaster: Gedruckt bey Francis Bailey).)
- His Excellency
- Sage of Mount Vernon

== John Adams ==
- Bonny Johnny, "Bonny" meaning a sizeable person.
- The Colossus of Independence, for his leadership in Congress in 1776
- The Duke of Braintree, due to residing in Braintree, Massachusetts and his strong opinions on the use of honorifics for important officers of the government
- Father of American Independence
- His Rotundity, for his girthy bodily figure
- Old Oak, for his wise intellect
- Old Sink or Swim, for the speech in which he vowed "sink or swim, live or die, survive or perish, I am with my country from this day on"

== Thomas Jefferson ==
- The Apostle of Democracy
- Father of the Declaration of Independence
- Long Tom
- The Man of the People
- The Moonshine Philosopher of Monticello, as Jefferson was known for his interest in alcohol
- Red Fox, for his red hair.
- The Sage of Monticello

== James Madison ==
- Father of the Constitution
- Little Jemmy or His Little Majesty, at only 5 feet 4 inches (163 cm), the shortest U.S. president
- The Sage of Montpelier
- Withered Little Apple, given by Washington Irving

== James Monroe ==
- The Era of Good Feelings President, for the Era of Good Feelings, the period following the victorious end of the War of 1812. The term was first coined by the Boston Federalist newspaper Columbian Centinel on July 12, 1817, following Monroe’s visit to Boston.
- The Last Cocked Hat, because he was the last U.S. president to wear a tricorne hat according to the style of the 18th century

== John Quincy Adams ==
- The Abolitionist or Old Man Eloquent, famed for routinely bringing up the slavery issue against Congressional rules, and for his role later on in the Amistad case. He is the only American president to be elected to the House of Representatives after his presidency. The nickname gained currency as a result of his campaign against slavery waged as a congressman, and as the attorney in the Amistad case.
- Mad Old Man From Massachusetts

== Andrew Jackson ==
- The Hero of New Orleans, for his military victory in the Battle of New Orleans
- Jackass, Jackson's critics disparaged him as a "jackass" (a male donkey); however, Jackson embraced the animal, making it the unofficial symbol of the Democratic Party.
- King Andrew, for his supposedly excessive use of the veto power
- King Mob
- Mad Dog Jackson, for his aggressive military tactics
- Mischievous Andy
- The Old Barbarian
- The Old Hero was derivative of the Hero of New Orleans sobriquet, but it had a more disparaging, slightly disdainful connotation.
- Old Hickory, allegedly given to him by his soldiers for being as "tough as old hickory," although the Oxford English Dictionary suggests an association with the euphemism hickory oil, a reference to punishment by whipping
- The Old Roman
- People's President
- Sharp Knife, for his fighting tactics

== Martin Van Buren ==
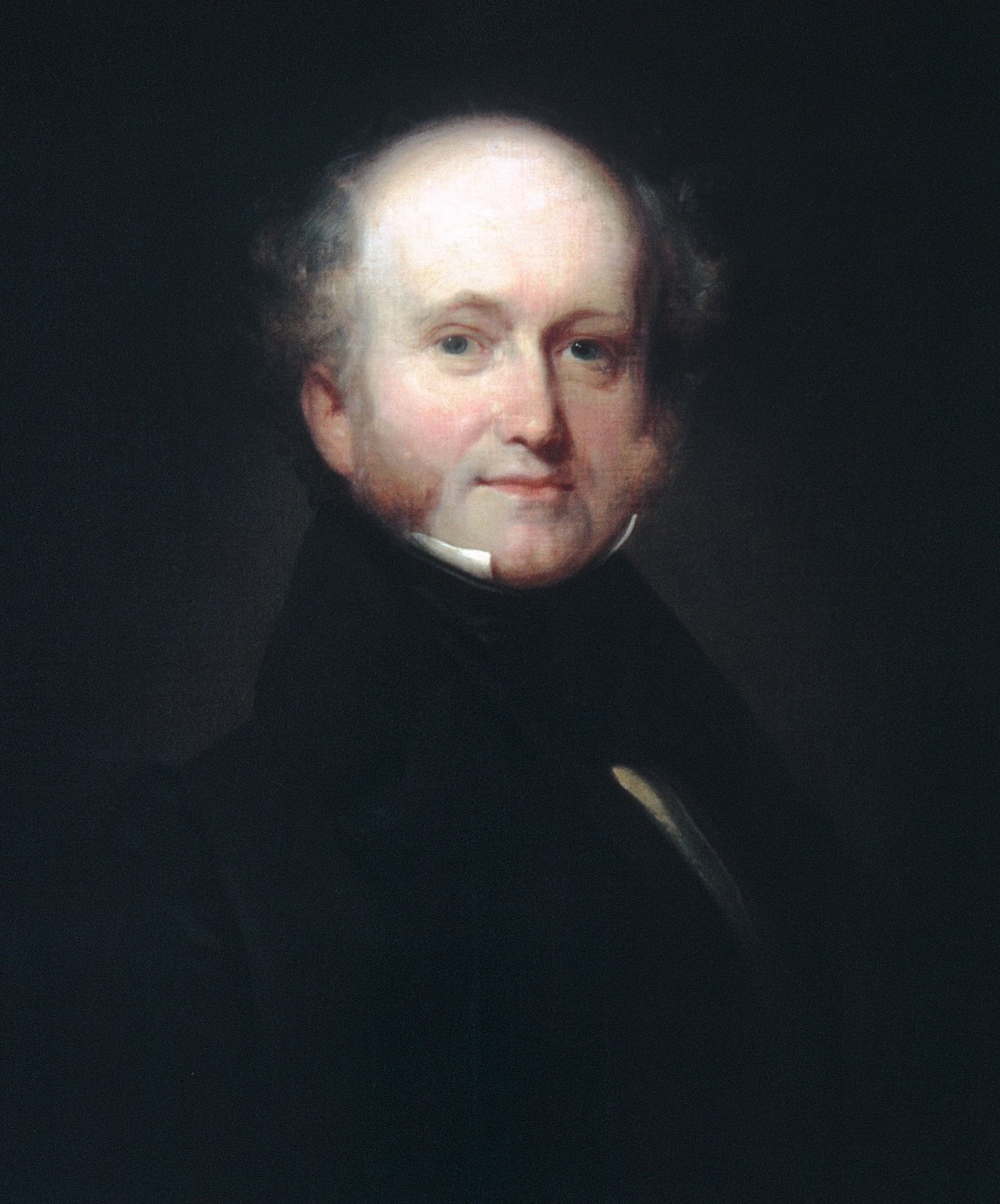
Van Buren was given many nicknames due to his distinct appearance and attractive personality.

- The American Talleyrand
- Blue Whiskey Van, a reference to his excessive drinking of whiskey
- The Careful Dutchman_{,} Van Buren's first language was Dutch
- Dandy President, critics called him for his fancy expensive outfits
- The Enchanter
- The Great Manager
- The Little Magician, given to him during his time in the state of New York, because of his smooth politics and short stature
- Machiavellian Bellshazzar, given to him by detractors
- Martin Van Ruin
- The Master Spirit
- Matty Van from "Tippecanoe Songs of 1840"
- The Mistletoe Politician, so called by Joseph Peyton of Tennessee, a Whig opponent, who charged that "Martin Van Buren was a mere political parasite, a branch of mistletoe, that owed its elevation, its growth--nay, its very existence, to the tall trunk of an aged hickory" (i.e. Andrew Jackson)
- Old Kinderhook (OK), a reference to his home town
- Red Fox of Kinderhook, a reference to his red hair and home town
- The Sage of Lindenwald
- The Sly Fox

== William Henry Harrison ==
- The Cincinnatus of the West, Harrison's military victories in the War of 1812 made him a folk-like hero, similar to George Washington and Cincinnatus
- General Mum, as in the expression, "keep it mum," because of his avoidance of speaking out on controversial issues during his election campaign
- Old Granny, his opponents called him for he was the oldest person at the time to be president; his age was 68.
- Tippecanoe or also Old Tippecanoe, a reference to Harrison's victory at the 1811 Battle of Tippecanoe; used in the campaign song Tippecanoe and Tyler Too during the 1840 presidential election
- Washington of the West, a reference to Harrison's victories at the 1811 Battle of Tippecanoe and 1813 Battle of the Thames

== John Tyler ==
- His Accidency, a nickname given by his opponents; the first president to be elevated to the presidency by the death of his predecessor, William Henry Harrison
- The President without a Party, after the Whigs expelled him

== James K. Polk ==
- First Dark Horse President, he was not well known before the 1844 United States presidential election
- Napoleon of the Stump, for his short stature and potent oratory skills
- Polk the Purposeful
- Polk the Plodder or Polk the Mendacious, multiple politicians saw him as untrustworthy and scheming.
- Punctilious James
- Young Hickory, because he was a particular protégé of "Old Hickory", Andrew Jackson

== Zachary Taylor ==
- Old Rough and Ready
- Old Zack, his age being 61 when leading troops during the Mexican-American War

== Millard Fillmore ==
- The American Louis Philippe, his appearance and tenure similar to the French king.
- Last of the Whigs, he was the last member of the Whig Party to become president
- Wool Carder President, when he was 15, he was sent to be an apprentice to a wool carder

== Franklin Pierce ==
- Fainting Frank or the Fainting General, used by Whig Party opponents for his record in the Mexican–American War
- Handsome Frank
- Purse
- Young Hickory of the Granite Hills, "Young Hickory" compared his military deeds (in the Mexican–American War) with those of Andrew Jackson. "The Granite Hills" were his home state of New Hampshire.

== James Buchanan ==
- Bachelor President, per his unmarried status
- Miss Nancy, alongside William King's Aunt Fancy. Andrew Jackson reportedly used these names to suggest effeminacy.
- Old Buck, from a shortening of his last name, used later in life
- Old Public Functionary, used by Buchanan in his December 1859 State of the Union address and adopted by newspapers
- Ten-Cent Jimmy, derogatory, as a reaction to Buchanan's campaign statement that ten cents a day was decent pay for a worker

== Abraham Lincoln ==
- Abe
  - Honest Abe
  - Uncle Abe, for his avuncularity in his later years.
- The Ancient One, a nickname favored by White House insiders because of his "ancient wisdom".
- Grand Wrestler, Lincoln was great at wrestling and only had one recorded loss
- The Great Emancipator and the Liberator, for the emancipation of the slaves.
- The Rail-Splitter
- Spotty Lincoln
- The Tycoon, for the energetic and ambitious conduct of his administration
- The Uncommon Friend of the Common Man

== Andrew Johnson ==
- Andy the Sot, used by his opponents after a perceived drunken inaugural address as vice president.
- King Andrew or King Andy, his large use of veto powers drew comparisons to a tyrannical dictator
- Sir Veto, because of the large number of legislative vetoes he issued during his presidency; 29 in total, (the most at the time)
- The Tennessee Tailor, for his career as a tailor before going into politics

== Ulysses S. Grant ==
- The American Caesar
- The Butcher, Grant's unmatched persistence led him to win several key victories for the Union forces earning him this nickname
- The Galena Tanner
- The Great Hammerer
- The Hero of Appomattox
- Little Beauty, a nickname mocking his good looks
- Ulyss, childhood nickname
- Useless Grant
- U.S. Grant
  - Uncle Sam Grant, a name given to him by his classmates at West Point
  - Unconditional Surrender Grant, a backronym for his uncompromising demand for unconditional surrender during the Battle of Fort Donelson in 1862, which made him a hero
  - United States Grant, his classmates soon began to call after he got his new initials USG

== Rutherford B. Hayes ==
- Dark Horse President
- Granny Hayes, for his calm and caring personality.
- His Fraudulency or Rutherfraud, because after the disputed results of the 1876 Election, many Democrats did not consider him legitimately to be president
- The Great Unknown, for his obscurity as a candidate
- President De Facto
- Rud, childhood nickname

== James Garfield ==
- Boatman Jim, referencing his work on the Ohio canals in his youth
- Canal Boy, also referring to his old job on Ohio canals as a boy
- Gar, nickname from college
- The Plow Boy of Ohio, sung in a campaign song.
- Preacher President

== Chester A. Arthur ==
- Chet or Our Chet, shortened version of his name used by publications of that era
- Elegant Arthur, for his style and large wardrobe of clothes
- Gentleman Boss, as the dapper leader of New York State's Republican party
- Prince Arthur and the Dude President, for his fancy attire and indulgence in extravagant luxury
- Walrus, because of his mustache

== Grover Cleveland ==
- Big Steve, as his full name was Stephen Grover Cleveland
- Grover the Good, for his honesty and public integrity
- His Obstinacy, because he vetoed more bills than the first 21 presidents combined
- The Stuffed Prophet, referencing his stubborn attitude
- Uncle Jumbo, his weight reaching around 280 pounds during his presidency.

== Benjamin Harrison ==
- The Centennial President
- The Front Porch Campaigner; during the 1888 election, he gave nearly ninety speeches from his front porch to crowds gathered in the yard of his Indianapolis home; this nickname has been widely but erroneously attributed to William McKinley.
- Grandfather's Hat, for his grandfather William Henry Harrison was the 9th president of the United States
- The Human Iceberg, although he could warmly engage a crowd with his speeches, he was cold and detached when speaking with people on an individual basis
- Kid Gloves Harrison
- Little Ben, given to him by Democrats of his era because of his stature; this could also be a reference to his being the grandson of former president William Henry Harrison, who had served fifty years before.
- Pious Moonlight Dude, because of his romance

== William McKinley ==
- Idol of Ohio
- The Major
- The Napoleon of Protection, referring to high tariffs such as the one he wrote in 1890
- Wobbly Willie, due to flip-flopping on issues such as expansionism

== Theodore Roosevelt ==
- The Colonel, for his rank in the Spanish–American War
- The Cyclone Assemblyman
- The Hero of San Juan Hill, for leading his Rough Riders up San Juan Hill during the Battle of Santiago de Cuba in 1898
- The Lion
- Teddy, used in The New York Times at least as early as 1900, even though he hated the nickname
  - Terrible Teddy
  - Toothful Teddy, for his iconic and prominent grin
- Telescope Teddy, because he had all his rifles fitted with a small telescope
- Teedie, childhood nickname
- TR, for signing communications this way; perhaps the first president to be known by his initials
- The Trust Buster, so called as a pioneer of busting business trusts

== William Howard Taft ==
- Big Bill, for his large appearance
- Big Chief
- Big Lub, his boyhood nickname
- Sleeping Beauty, a nickname his wife Helen Herron Taft called him because he was always falling asleep

== Woodrow Wilson ==
- Coiner of Weasel Words, given by former president Theodore Roosevelt in a speech
- The Phrasemaker, as an acclaimed historian, Wilson had no need of speech-writers to supply his oratorical eloquence
- Professor, for his job was a college professor
- The Schoolmaster, a bespectacled academic who lectured his visitors (Note: Compare to Italian prime minister (and former president of the European Commission) Romano Prodi's nickname Il Professore (the professor/schoolteacher))

== Warren G. Harding ==
- Charming Harding
- Winnie, childhood nickname
- Wobbly Warren, because of his flip-flopping and closeness to his cabinet during important events, similar to William McKinley

== Calvin Coolidge ==
- Cal, short for Calvin
  - Cautious Cal
  - Cool Cal, since his reelection campaign used the slogan, "Keep It Cool With Coolidge"
  - Silent Cal, for his quiet personality
- Red, because of his hair color

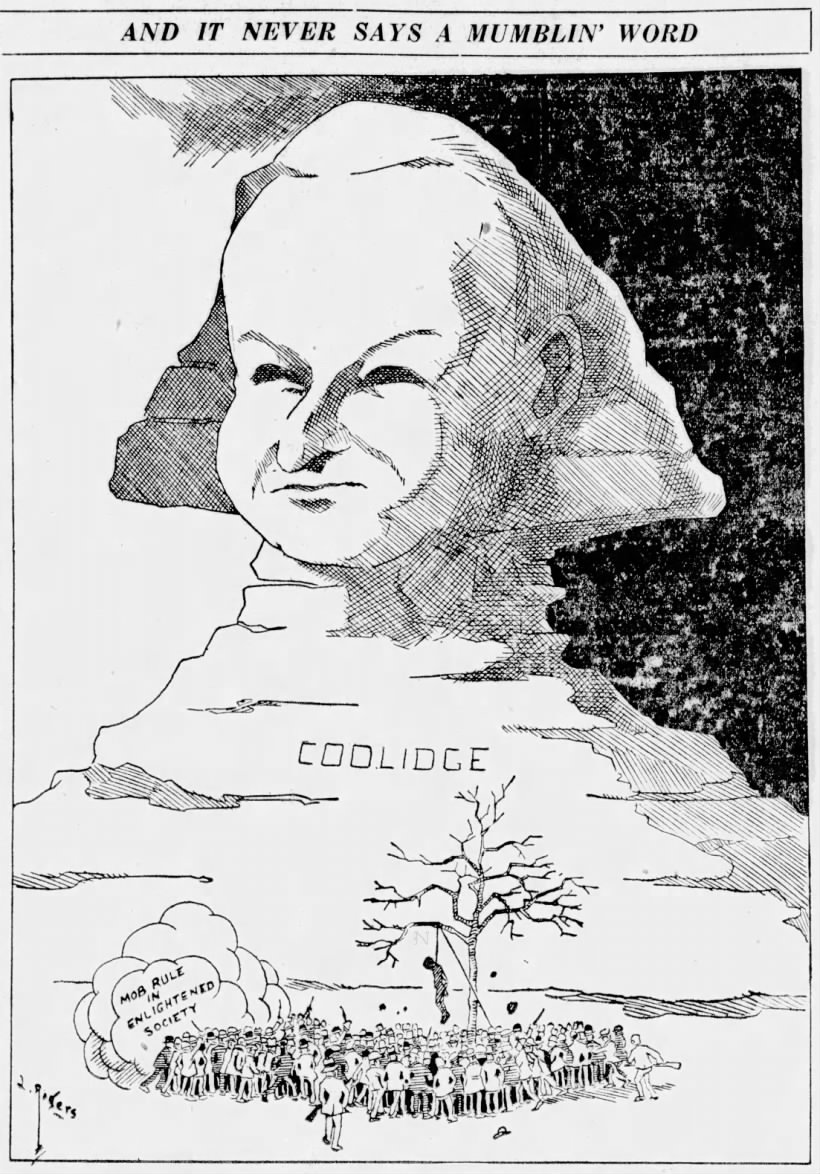
Coolidge caricatured as the Great Sphynx, remaining silent and passive as a lynching occurs on the ground under his watch.

- The Sphinx or Sphinx of the Potomac, because he was non talkative and a man of few words

== Herbert Hoover ==
- The Chief, a nickname picked up at the age of 23 as a geologist surveying in the Australian Outback, that stuck for the rest of his life
- The Grand Old Man, for the Grand Old Party
- The Hermit Author of Palo Alto, where he occasionally lived.
- The Great Engineer and the Great Humanitarian, he was a civil engineer of some distinction and when the Mississippi burst its banks in 1927, engulfing thousands of acres of agricultural land, he volunteered his services and did extensive flood control work. The latter nickname would later be used facetiously in reference to his perceived indifference to the hardships faced by his constituents during the Great Depression. However, the nickname dates back to 1921, when the ARA under Hoover saved millions of Russians suffering from famine. "It was such considerations that Walter Lippmann took into account when he wrote of Hoover's Russian undertaking in the New York World in May 1922: 'probably no other living man could have done nearly so much'".

== Franklin D. Roosevelt ==
- Delano, middle name that also meant "of the anus" in Italian, used by Benito Mussolini
- FDR, abbreviation of his full name
- Feather-duster, boys at Groton School called him because they thought he was snobbish and "a bit of a sissy"
- King Franklin, for the expansion of presidential power during his tenure
- Sphinx, in reference to his initial silence on whether or not he would run for a third term. Later visually depicted in a caricature sculpture commissioned by Secretary James D. Preston of the National Archives
- Squire of Hyde Park
- That Man in the White House, used by those who disliked Roosevelt so much that they outright avoided saying his name

== Harry S. Truman ==
- Billy Bunk, full of spunk or Billie Spunk
- Give 'Em Hell Harry (also a campaign slogan)
- Haberdasher Harry
- High Tax Harry, after a veto on a bill to reduce income taxes
- Man From Independence
- The Second Missouri Compromise, his selection as Roosevelt's vice president was from an agreement made by party bosses and Southern conservatives
- The Senator From Pendergast, for his connection with political boss Tom Pendergast

== Dwight D. Eisenhower ==
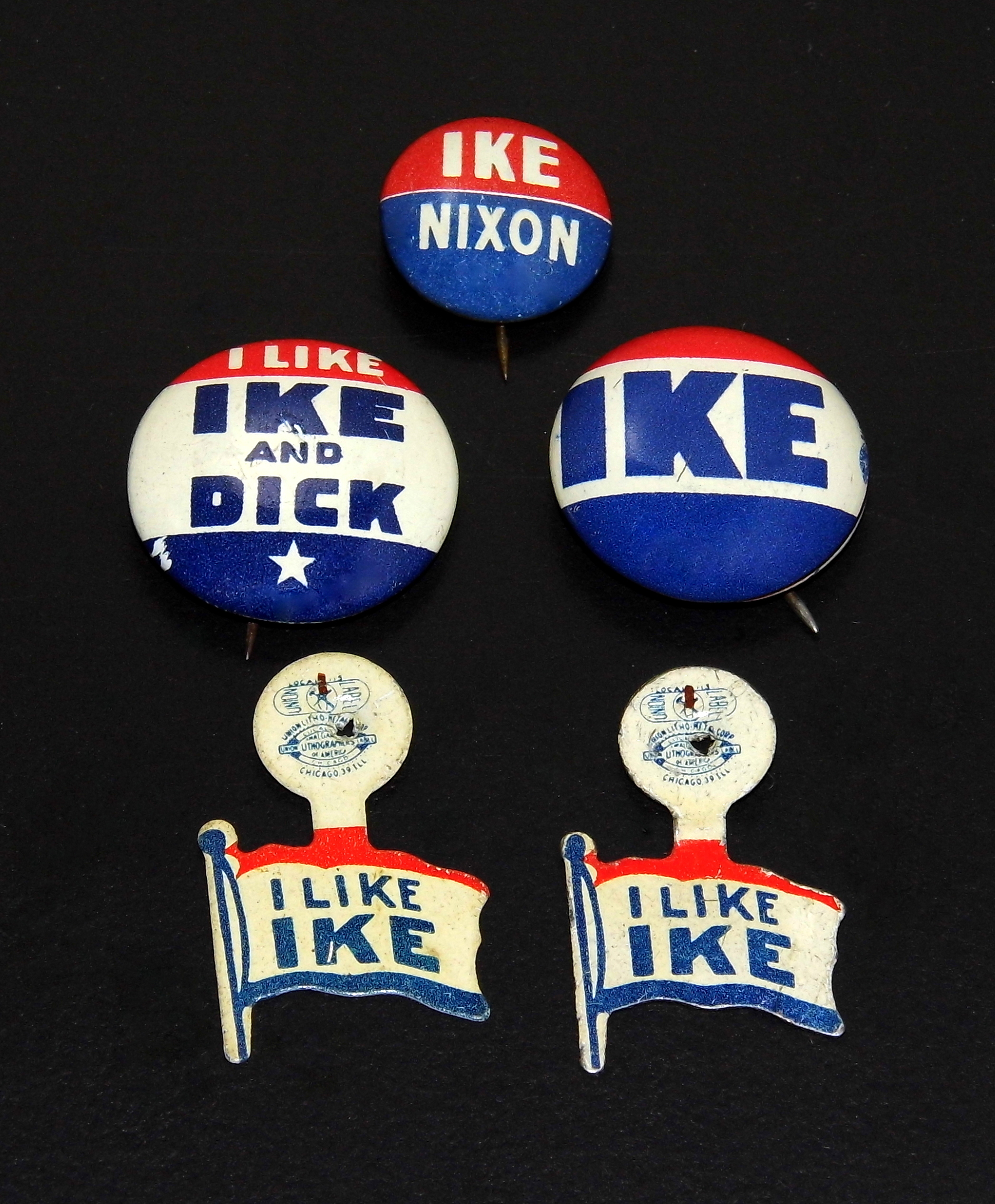
1952 and 1956 buttons

- Ike, known for being in his campaign slogan "I like Ike"
- The Kansas Cyclone, name from college football college football nickname.

== John F. Kennedy ==
- The American Erlander, as he was known in Sweden, due to his friendship with Prime Minister Tage Erlander and their shared interest in social welfare
- Jack, Kennedy was usually referred to as either "John F. Kennedy" or "Jack Kennedy". See also Senator, you're no Jack Kennedy.
- JFK, most prominent nickname and abbreviation of his full name
- The King of Camelot
- Little Boy Blue, he was called by his predecessor Dwight D. Eisenhower
- Rat Face, kids at his school called him for his skinny appearance

== Lyndon B. Johnson ==
- Bull Johnson, for his reputation for boasting at Southwest Texas State Teachers College
- Landslide Lyndon, ironic reference to the Box 13 scandal, a hotly disputed 87-vote win that put him into the Senate in 1948, which became more appropriate in his supporters' eyes following his victory in the 1964 presidential election
- LBJ, he liked to be known by his initials, which was used in the campaign slogan, "All the way with LBJ"; later it would be used in the anti-Vietnam War political slogan "Hey, hey, LBJ, how many kids did you kill today?"
- Light-Bulb Lyndon, because he hated wasting electricity, and would often storm around the White House shutting off unnecessary lights
- Rufus Cornpone, used as an attack on his rural accent by members of the Kennedy administration at dinner parties

== Richard Nixon ==
- Iron-Butt, for his relentless work ethic.
- Mad-Monk
- Richard the Chicken-Hearted, used in the 1968 election for his refusal to debate Humphrey.
- Tricky Dick, from a Democratic Party ad leading up to the 1950 U.S. Senate election in California saying "Look at 'Tricky Dick' Nixon's Republican Record"

== Gerald Ford ==
- Jerry
  - Jerry the Jerk, given by conservative critics after nominating moderate Nelson Rockefeller as vice president.
- Junie, childhood nickname
- Klutz or Klutz-in-Chief, famously being prone to gaffes.
- Mr. Nice Guy, for his clean-cut and non-partisan image

== Jimmy Carter ==
- Hot, short for Hot Shot, which was a childhood nickname
- Jimmy, the first president to use his nickname in an official capacity, rather than his first name James
- Jimmy Cardigan, got the nickname after he wore a sweater instead of a suit one day
- The Peanut Farmer, he owned a peanut farm and fostered this image in his early campaigns, as a contrast to elite Washington insiders

== Ronald Reagan ==
- Bonzo, from the name of the chimp in Bedtime for Bonzo (1951), a film that Reagan starred in.
- Dutch, shortly after his birth, his father said he looked like a "fat little Dutchman"; reinforced when he wore a Dutch boy haircut as a youngster
- The Gipper, after his role as George "The Gipper" Gipp in the film Knute Rockne, All American (1940). Gipp exhorted his teammates to "Win one for the Gipper".
- The Great Communicator, for his ability to communicate
- The Teflon President, coined by Representative Pat Schroeder because nothing negative "stuck to" him (like a Teflon skillet); he remained blame-free in the eyes of the American people.

== George H. W. Bush ==
- 41, Papa Bush, Bush 41, Bush Sr., Senior, and similar names that were used after his son George W. Bush became the 43rd president, to differentiate between the two
- Little Pop, because he was named after a grandfather
- Poppy, a nickname used from childhood on

== Bill Clinton ==
- The Big Dog, used by political allies during his post-presidency.
- Boy Governor, at only 32 years of age, Clinton was the second-youngest governor of Arkansas.
- Bubba, common nickname for males in the Southern U.S.
- The Comeback Kid, coined by press after strong second place showing in the 1992 New Hampshire primary, following polling slump
- Explainer-in-Chief, for his directness when speaking about political concerns.
- Slick Willie, a term originally coined when he was Governor of Arkansas and popularized by newspaper Pine Bluff Commercial, whose staff disagreed with his political views

== George W. Bush ==
- 43, Bush Jr., Junior, Bush 43, and similar names, used to differentiate him from his father
- Decider-in-Chief
- Dubya, based on a Texas pronunciation of "W"
- Jefe, meaning "the boss" or "chief", by his grandchildren
- Shrub, nickname his high school classmate Molly Ivins gave to him
- Uncurious George, for his short time spent following events of the Iraq War

== Barack Obama ==
- Bama and Rock, used by George W. Bush
- Barry, short for Barack
- Barry O'Bomber, teammates in High School called him because he was great at scoring baskets in basketball
- Deporter-in-Chief, used by immigrants rights activists for his record number of deportations
- Nobama, primarily by Republicans and South African protestors
- No Drama Obama, for his cautious and meticulous presidential campaign in 2007–2008 and for his patient, relaxed demeanor
- Obamna, from a mispronunciation of his name by his successor Donald Trump during a 2018 campaign rally, which later became an Internet meme
- Obomber, used by critics of his foreign policy, which included heavy usage of drone strikes and aerial bombing in several Middle Eastern countries.
- Obozo and Obummer, used by conservatives

== Donald Trump ==
- 45, the 45, and 47 and similar names, referencing his being the 45th president, and his penchant for wearing monogrammed "45" apparel (and after the 2024 United States presidential election, with the number 47)
- Dementia Don, due to speculation he is afflicted with dementia amid other age and health concerns. Trump has a history of dementia and mental illness in his family, and his cognitive impairment has been widely speculated by professionals, politicians, and the public.
- Dirty Donald, quoting a 2018 email from Jeffrey Epstein to Kathryn Ruemmler stating "I know how dirty Donald is".
- DJT, his initials.
- The Donald, since his first wife Ivana Trump referred to him as such in a 1989 Spy magazine cover story. Namesake for r/The_Donald.
- Don Snoreleone and The Nodfather, due to several reports of Trump falling asleep at public events, and in derisive comparison to Vito Corleone of The Godfather. Latter attributed to Gavin Newsom.
- Drumpf, from the ancestral German spelling of his surname, considered humorous by modern American standards. When exactly Drumpf was Anglicized as Trump in his family is unknown, but appears to have happened sometime during the Thirty Years' War (1618–1648). The nickname was adopted by detractors of Trump after comedian and political commentator John Oliver highlighted the etymology in a segment on Last Week Tonight with John Oliver and encouraged his audience to "Make Donald Drumpf Again".
- Felon-in-Chief, due to Trump being a convicted felon during his second presidency. He was convicted of 34 counts of falsifying business records in The People of the State of New York v. Donald J. Trump.
- King Donald, due to Trump's purported fascist tendencies and associated democratic backsliding in the United States. Usage was furthered by the No Kings protests and the second Trump administration's issue of statements regarding Trump as "king".
- Orange Man, in reference to his prominent orange makeup. Especially used in the phrase "Orange man bad," a phrase meant to suggest that Trump's opponents have "Trump derangement syndrome".
- President Snowflake and Snowflake-in-Chief, using the term "Snowflake", for his poor reactions to criticism, particularly on Twitter and regarding the Mueller probe and related investigations.
- Sleepy Don and Sleepy Donald, in appropriation of Trump's usage of "Sleepy Joe", seen as hypocritical given reports of Trump falling asleep at public events, and concerns about his own age and health.
- TACO Trump, an initialism of "Trump Always Chickens Out", for repeated recanting on previous statements and policy positions. Coined in 2025 by Robert Armstrong of Financial Times due to tariffs in the second Trump administration being walked back in the resulting trade wars despite Trump's initial denials for negotiations around them.
- Teflon Don, referencing the original Teflon Don for the many legal issues surrounding Donald Trump.

== Joe Biden ==
- Amtrak Joe, from his association with Amtrak trains, which he would use to commute to Washington, D.C.
- Beijing Biden, a nickname used by critics of Biden who perceive him as lenient in foreign policy towards China
- Brandon, or Joe Brandon, and derivatives such as Dark Brandon, based on the anti-Biden political slogan "Let's Go Brandon" which is a coded way of saying "Fuck Joe Biden".
- Creepy Joe, a nickname used by Biden's opponents referring to his perceived creepy interactions with women.
- Crooked Joe, nickname used by Biden's opponent Donald Trump and his supporters in the 2024 presidential election, implying responsibility for unsubstantiated electoral fraud in the 2020 presidential election.
- Genocide Joe, due to his support of Israel during the Gaza war amidst the humanitarian crisis and genocide in Gaza
- Scranton Joe, from his birthplace of Scranton, Pennsylvania and association with blue-collar politics
- Sleepy Joe, nickname used by Biden's opponent Donald Trump and his supporters, most prominently in the 2020 presidential election, to attack Biden as 'mentally slow'

== See also ==
- Secret Service code name § Presidents and their families
- List of nicknames of prime ministers of Australia
- List of nicknames of prime ministers of Italy
- List of nicknames of prime ministers of the United Kingdom
- List of nicknames used by George W. Bush
- List of nicknames used by Donald Trump
