= List of nicknames of prime ministers of Italy =

This is a list of nicknames of prime ministers of Italy. Many prime ministers have had a nickname which was in common usage at the time they were in office. Many nicknames can be perceived as disparaging although others are complimentary or affectionate.

== List of nicknames ==
=== Camillo Benso di Cavour ===
Full name: Camillo Benso, Count of Cavour

- The Great Weaver (Il Gran Tessitore)

=== Bettino Ricasoli ===
Full name: Bettino Ricasoli

- Iron Baron (Barone di Ferro)

=== Alfonso Ferrero La Marmora ===
Full name: Alfonso Ferrero La Marmora

- Bomber of the People (Cannoneggiatore del Popolo)

=== Agostino Depretis ===
Full name: Agostino Depretis

- Janus Bifrons (Giano Bifronte)
- Chameleon (Camaleonte)

=== Francesco Crispi ===
Full name: Francesco Crispi

- The Loner (Il Solitario)

=== Giovanni Giolitti ===
Full name: Giovanni Giolitti

- Minister of Underworld (Ministro della Malavita)
- The Man of Dronero (L'Uomo di Dronero)

=== Vittorio Emanuele Orlando ===
Full name: Vittorio Emanuele Orlando

- The President of Victory (Il Presidente della Vittoria)

=== Benito Mussolini ===
Full name: Benito Amilcare Andrea Mussolini

- Duce
- Big Head (Il Testone)
- Bald Head (Crapa Pelada, in Lombard language)
- The Jaw (Il Mascella)
- He (Lui)
- The Stinker (Er puzzone, in Romanesco dialect)

=== Alcide De Gasperi ===
Full name: Alcide De Gasperi

- Cold polenta (Polenta fredda)

=== Amintore Fanfani ===
Full name: Amintore Fanfani

- Purebred Horse (Cavallo di Razza)
- Pony
- There he is again (Rieccolo)

=== Mario Scelba ===
Full name: Mario Scelba

- Iron Sicilian (Siciliano di Ferro)

=== Aldo Moro ===
Full name: Aldo Moro

- Doctor Divago (Dottor Divago) – A pun about Doctor Zhivago.
- Purebred Horse (Cavallo di Razza)

=== Mariano Rumor ===
Full name: Mariano Rumor

- Pious Mariano (Pio Mariano)

=== Giulio Andreotti ===
Full name: Giulio Andreotti

- Divus Julius (Divo Giulio)
- The Hunchback (Il Gobbo)
- Beelzebub (Belzebù)
- Uncle Giulio (Zio Giulio)
- The Sphinx (La Sfinge)
- The Black Pope (Il Papa Nero)
- The Fox (La Volpe)
- Moloch
- The Eternity (L’Eternità)

=== Francesco Cossiga ===
Full name: Francesco Cossiga

- Koiga
- The Pickaxe-wielder (Il Picconatore)

=== Arnaldo Forlani ===
Full name: Arnaldo Forlani

- Wererabbit (Coniglio Mannaro)
- The Firefighter (Il Pompiere)

=== Bettino Craxi ===
Full name: Benedetto Craxi

- The Big Boar (Il Cinghialone)

=== Giuliano Amato ===
Full name: Giuliano Amato

- Doctor Subtilis (Dottor Sottile)

=== Silvio Berlusconi ===
Full name: Silvio Berlusconi

- The Knight (Il Cavaliere)
- The Caiman (Il Caimano)
- Daddy (Papi)
- His Broadcasting (Sua Emittenza) – A pun about Sua Eminenza, "His Eminence".
- The Dwarf (Il Nano)
- Berlusca
- B.

=== Lamberto Dini ===
Full name: Lamberto Dini

- The Toad (Il Rospo)

=== Romano Prodi ===
Full name: Romano Prodi

- The Professor (Il Professore)
- Mortadella

=== Massimo D'Alema ===
Full name: Massimo D'Alema

- Little moustache (Baffino)
- Leader Maximo

=== Mario Monti ===
Full name: Mario Monti

- Rigor Montis

=== Matteo Renzi ===
Full name: Matteo Renzi

- The Scrapper (Il Rottamatore)
- Kraken
- The Bomb (Il Bomba)
- Renzie
- Renzusconi

=== Paolo Gentiloni ===
Full name: Paolo Gentiloni Silveri

- Paolo The Calm (Paolo il Calmo)
- The Slow-mover (Er moviola)
- The Un-populist (L'impopulista)

=== Giuseppe Conte ===
Full name: Giuseppe Conte

- The Lawyer of the People (L'avvocato del popolo)

=== Mario Draghi ===
Full name: Mario Draghi

- Super Mario

=== Giorgia Meloni ===
Full name: Giorgia Meloni

- Giorgia
- Gioggia
- The Suburbanite (La Borgatara)
- The Fishwife (La Pesciarola)

== See also ==
- List of nicknames of prime ministers of Australia
- List of nicknames of prime ministers of the United Kingdom
- List of nicknames of presidents of the United States
