= Greased piglet =

Epithet for Boris Johnson

"Greased piglet" is an epithet used by former British Prime Minister David Cameron to describe later British Prime Minister Boris Johnson. The term has been applied to Johnson by the British media, international media, as well as political adversaries, and some political scientists.

== Origin ==
The term originates from October 2019 when former British Prime Minister David Cameron, in discussing the difficult Brexit talks, said of Prime Minister Boris Johnson, "The thing about the greased piglet is that he manages to slip through other people's hands where mere mortals fail".

At the time, Cameron was speaking at the annual October Harrogate Literature Festival in North Yorkshire to promote his book For the Record, when he was asked about his relationship with Johnson and if they had nicknames for each other. Cameron made the comment by way of responding to the question, disclosing what he had texted to a friend who had asked him about Johnson's chances of getting his upcoming Brexit legislation voted through parliament.

The political editor of The Independent John Rentoul, noted that Johnson had himself previously called the former British Prime Ministers Tony Blair and David Cameron a "greased piglet", on separate occasions.

== Meaning ==
In 2019, The Economist said the term was one of four faces that Johnson portrayed, being the "player, gambler, Machiavelli or piglet", and that the greased piglet "either wriggles through loopholes or else shifts the blame expertly to anyone but himself". In 2022, The New Zealand Herald said the use of the term in relation to Johnson was "due to his legendary ability to evade scandal", while The New York Times attributed the term to him being "a man who could slip out of any tight situation".

In March 2021, British political journalist Andrew Rawnsley wrote of Johnson, "'Getting away with it' has been one of the more consistent features of the career of a man whom other Tories call 'the greased piglet', and quoted a former cabinet minister who told him "Boris has got this Teflon quality. He gets away with things that no other politician would get away with".

In May 2022, Pankaj Mishra, writing in The Washington Post, wrote that the "greased piglet" term had become associated with the myth of Johnson as "a great survivor". The Washington Post wrote "Yet Johnson perseveres, even attracting a myth that he is a great survivor, a “greased piglet,” in former Prime Minister David Cameron’s description, able to slip out of every cage he lands in. On closer examination, Johnson’s survival skills amount to little more than shamelessness. He owes his resilience in disgrace to Britain’s debased political culture and institutions such as the British parliament, the media, the London police, and the Conservative party."

== See also ==
- Public image of Boris Johnson
- List of nicknames of prime ministers of the United Kingdom
