= Tony Abbott onion video =

Viral video of Australian Prime Minister Tony Abbott

The video circulated widely online and in the news in March 2015

On 13 March 2015, the then-Prime Minister of Australia, Tony Abbott, bit into a whole raw onion while being filmed on a visit to Charlton Farm Produce, a factory in rural northern Tasmania. While Abbott has since stated otherwise, most news media said the onion appeared to be unpeeled. A video of the act circulated widely online and received considerable media attention, particularly after he was ousted as prime minister that September.

== Background ==
Tony Abbott was Prime Minister of Australia from 2013 to September 2015 under the Liberal Party of Australia. He had previously bitten into an onion in a similar way; in 2011, he was filmed consuming a large spring onion or shallot in Queensland. In this less popular video, The Guardian noted that Abbott seemed to be grimacing, and had his hand in his pocket.

At the time, Abbott was facing high unpopularity as well as challenges to his leadership. The day prior to the filming of the 2015 video, he had been criticised for a video he had released for Saint Patrick's Day which had been deemed "patronising". During a tour of Tasmania to promote a $200 million expansion of a freight shipping subsidy scheme, on 13 March 2015, he visited Charlton Farm Produce in the north of the state alongside attorney general George Brandis. The farm owner, David Addison, handed Abbott an onion.

== Video ==
In the short video, Abbott bites into the onion. He does not flinch, and appears to enjoy its taste, appreciatively nodding as he chews. Business Insider compared the act to the way in which one may bite into an apple, and The Guardian noted that "[his] eyes are open and his face is calm. He wastes no time. He knows what to expect." Multiple news sources report that the onion appeared to be unpeeled.

After the video ended, Abbott said, "better than any other onions I've eaten in a long time."

Four years later in February 2019, Andrew Bolt asked Abbott, in reference to the onion biting video, "what was going through your mind there?" Abbott, who was drinking whisky during the interview, replied, "well, I was at a Tasmanian farm and the farmer understandably was incredibly proud of his produce. All of us eat raw onion occasionally. Salads are full of raw onion. This was an onion that had lost all of its outer skin. It had in-effect been peeled. So I thought the least I can do, for someone who was as proud of his product as this particular farmer, was take a chomp. It was beautiful. Absolutely beautiful."

== Reactions ==
The Australian Broadcasting Corporation immediately made the video available online, including on now-defunct social media platform Vine where videos were presented in a six-second loop. Professor Tim Highfield noted that the presentation of the video on the platform "in its raw form – like the onion," was "an ideal match between footage and platform," and that "the recurring sight underlines its surrealism, warranting repeat viewing without making it any less inexplicable.

=== Initial reactions ===
ABC News stated that it was unclear why Abbott had bitten into the onion. After the event, Charlton Farm Produce owner David Addison said that Abbott's consumption of the onion "put us off guard a bit", and that "I mean, I'm an onion grower, so occasionally I see people eat them. But you don't really expect the PM to walk in, bite on an onion and eat it, leaf and all."

The video circulated widely online; The New Yorker described it as "the GIF seen 'round the world." On Twitter, the hashtags #onion and #oniongate trended widely on 13 March. Some reactions to the video were critical, whereas others seemed more positive or supportive. Victorian Labor MP Tim Watts wrote that "you've got to admit, eating an onion is a pretty good metaphor for the Abbott government overall". Political editor of Crikey, Bernard Keane, wrote that "OK he ate a raw onion. OK. I think I actually respect Abbott more now." On 17 March, Onions Australia stated it would deliver Abbott a basket of onions, a cooked meal featuring onions and a list of onion recipes to promote a campaign against imported produce. Its chief executive Lechelle Earl gave "mad props" to Abbott for providing it a platform to do so. She also said she was "happy for him to continue eating whole onions, but possibly just peel them first. That skin's a real killer." Within a month, the 6-second loop had been viewed on Vine over 4.5 million times, or for over 7,500 hours.

In August 2015, ABC News recovered Abbott's other spring onion or shallot eating video from 2011.

=== Onion biting trend ===
Multiple people participated in a trend of biting into an onion like Abbott had done. ABC Canberra breakfast producer Elliot Dunn did so. While on the radio station ABC Northern Tasmania, Devonport mayor Steve Martin took a large bite of an onion supplied by the station. While eating it, he said he "[didn't] know about holding a straight face," though stated that "it's crunchy and fresh. We do produce the best onions that have been very much sought after by the Chinese market. We're right on the money."

In April 2019, four years later, National Party of Australia resources minister Matt Canavan emulated the video of Abbott by biting into a similarly raw and unpeeled onion himself. In this video, Canavan stated that the taste was "not as bad as [he] thought." He uploaded the video to Twitter with the caption "maybe [Abbott] is on to something here."

=== 2015 leadership spill and #putoutyouronions ===
Abbott was ousted from office on 14 September 2015 when he lost a leadership spill within his own party after growing concern that he had become unpopular. Thousands of social media users responded to this on the hashtag #putoutyouronions, in which they placed onion bulbs on their front porches and in one instance outside Parliament House, Canberra. This gained 7,000 tweets in 24 hours. The hashtag itself references tributes to tragedies in Australia, including after the death of Australian cricketer Phillip Hughes under the hashtag #putyourbatsout in which users placed cricket bats outside, respects shown with wedding dresses after the murder of Stephanie Scott through #putyourdressout, and scarf tributes to Adelaide football coach Phil Walsh with #putoutyourscarves.

In 2017, a bust of Abbott at Prime Ministers Avenue was draped with a crown of onions, likely in reference to the video.

== See also ==
- Ed Miliband bacon sandwich photograph
- Liz Truss lettuce
- Plant epithet
