= List of nicknames of prime ministers of the United Kingdom =

This is a list of nicknames of prime ministers of the United Kingdom. Since Sir Robert Walpole, most prime ministers have had a nickname which was in common usage at the time they were in office. Many nicknames can be perceived as disparaging although others are complimentary or affectionate.

== 18th century ==
=== Robert Walpole ===
- Cock Robin
- Sir Bluestring
- Screen-Master General

=== Earl of Wilmington ===
- George II's Favourite Nonentity

=== Henry Pelham ===
- King Henry the Ninth

=== Duke of Newcastle ===
- Hubble-Bubble

=== Earl of Bute ===
- Jack Boot

=== George Grenville ===
- Gentle Shepherd

=== William Pitt the Elder ===
- The Great Commoner, in reference to his continued refusal of a peerage whilst in office, though he later accepted the title Earl of Chatham

=== Duke of Grafton ===
- Royal Oak
- The Turf Macaroni

=== Lord North ===
- Boreas (the north wind)
- Lord-deputy North

=== Earl of Shelburne ===
- Malagrida, after the Jesuit missionary Gabriel Malagrida
- The Jesuit in Berkerly Square

=== William Pitt the Younger ===
- Pitt the Younger, to distinguish him from his father, Pitt the Elder.
- Three-bottle man, in reference to his heavy consumption of port wine.

== 19th century ==
=== Henry Addington ===
- The Doctor

=== Lord Grenville ===
- Bogey

=== Spencer Perceval ===
- Little P

=== George Canning ===
- The Cicero of the British Senate
- The Zany of Debate

=== Viscount Goderich ===
- Prosperity Robinson
- Goody Goderich
- The Blubberer

=== Duke of Wellington ===
- The Iron Duke

=== Robert Peel ===
- Orange Peel, a reference to his views on Ireland.

=== Earl Russell ===
- Finality Jack
- The Widow's Mite

=== Earl of Derby ===
- Scorpion Stanley
- The Rupert of Debate

=== Earl of Aberdeen ===
- Lord Haddo, the courtesy title by which he was known before he succeeded to his grandfather's title of Earl of Aberdeen.

=== Lord Palmerston ===
- Lord Cupid
- Lord Pumicestone

=== Benjamin Disraeli ===
- Dizzy

=== Marquess of Salisbury ===
- Bob

=== William Gladstone ===
- Grand Old Man or its acronym GOM
  - God's Only Mistake, used by Disraeli as a mocking alternative to Gladstone's preferred nickname (Grand Old Man).
- The People's William
- Murderer of Gordon, a scathing inversion of Gladstone's preferred nickname (Grand Old Man) following the death of General Gordon at Khartoum. Gladstone had delayed sending Gordon military reinforcements, so was blamed for Gordon's subsequent defeat and execution by the Mahdists of the Sudan.

== 20th century ==
=== Arthur Balfour ===
- Pretty Fanny, a reference to his delicacy of appearance and manners.
- Bloody Balfour
- Tiger Lily
- Miss Nancy

=== Henry Campbell-Bannerman ===
- CB

=== H. H. Asquith ===
- The Last of the Romans
- The Sledgehammer
- Squiffy

=== David Lloyd George ===
- The Welsh Wizard
- The Man Who Won The War
- The Welsh Goat

=== Bonar Law ===
- The Unknown Prime Minister

=== Stanley Baldwin ===
- Honest Stan

=== Ramsay MacDonald ===
- Ramsay Mac
- Ramshackle Mac

=== Neville Chamberlain ===
- The Coroner, for dressing in black.
- Monsieur J'aime Berlin, French nickname meaning "Mr. I Love Berlin". Pun on the pronunciation of his name and referring to Chamberlain's policy of appeasement towards Germany.

=== Winston Churchill ===
- Winnie
- (British) Bulldog; first given to him by the Russians, it was a reference to his ferocity and focus.
- Colonel Warden was his favourite code name or nom-de-guerre.
- Former Naval Person and Naval Person; this was how Churchill signed many of his telegrams to US President Franklin D. Roosevelt, first choosing the code name "Naval Person" and later changing it to "Former Naval Person" after he became prime minister.
- Pig, an affectionate name used by his wife, Clementine.
- The Old Warrior

=== Clement Attlee ===
- Clem
- A sheep in sheep's clothing, an adaptation of wolf in sheep's clothing, derived from his mild-mannered, equable style which contrasted with Churchill.

=== Anthony Eden ===
- The Glamour Boy, in reference to his neat appearance.

=== Harold Macmillan ===
- Supermac, originally coined by Victor Weisz as the title of an editorial cartoon published in the Evening Standard.
- Mac the Knife, in reference to the Night of the Long Knives.

=== Alec Douglas-Home ===
- [Sir] Alec Douglas-Who?, referencing his relative obscurity, short premiership with few achievements, and mildmannered nature.
- Home Sweet Home, Churchill's nickname for him.
- Baillie Vass, from a miscaptioned photo of Douglas-Home referring to a bailie named Vass; popularised by Private Eye magazine.

=== Harold Wilson ===
- Wislon, a deliberate misspelling popularised by the fortnightly satirical magazine Private Eye.

=== Edward Heath ===
- Ted
- Grocer Heath

=== James Callaghan ===
- Big Jim
- Sunny Jim, a homonym of "Sonny Jim", used to patronise an inexperienced person, and to refer to his optimism. Particularly used in the media during the Winter of Discontent of 1978–79, when Callaghan appeared out of touch with the issues facing the nation at the time, such as when the most widespread industrial action since the 1926 general strike was taking place, and he arrived back from a summit in the Caribbean and talked about his swimming activities.
- Uncle Jim

=== Margaret Thatcher ===
- Attila the Hen, a pun on Attila the Hun
- That Bloody Woman or TBW
- Tina (There Is No Alternative), a reference to Thatcher's constant refrain that the market economy is the only system that works.
- That Great Charmer, an anagram of Margaret Thatcher.
- The Great She-Elephant, an allusion to Rudyard Kipling's Just So Stories.
- The Grocer's Daughter, a double meaning in that she was literally the daughter of a grocer, but also the successor to Edward Heath, "The Grocer".
- The Iron Lady
- Madame Frit, derived from her use of the dialect word frit in the House.
- Maggie
- Maggie the Great
- Milk Snatcher, from mischief-making by a Labour Party conference speaker based on her failure as Secretary of State for Education to completely protect the school milk budget from a treasury raid. The compromise she managed to secure was that free milk at school was only abolished for older primary school children – free milk for secondary school children had already been abolished in 1968 by the Harold Wilson Labour government.
- Mrs Finchley – a slip made by David Dimbleby during the BBC's coverage of the 1983 general election overnight results programme. Finchley was the parliamentary constituency Thatcher represented for over 30 years.
- Thatch, In the 1980s Ben Elton started a trend for referring to Mrs Thatcher as Thatch, a colloquialism for pubic hair.

=== John Major ===
- The Grey Man, a nickname used by opponents and observers to refer to Major's reputation as a decent but uninspiring person and politician with a lack of charisma, and by critics who accused him of weak and indecisive consensual leadership in contrast to the more authoritarian, strong-armed approach of his predecessor Margaret Thatcher, with his caricature Spitting Image puppet portraying him as such.
- Comeback Kid, a nickname applied to Major after he unexpectedly led the Conservatives to another victory in the 1992 general election after opinion polls had suggested a narrow Labour victory, and after he defeated Conservative rebellions against his pro-European Union policy and called and won the 1995 Conservative Party leadership election over this issue.
- Macho Major, a nickname used by Major's supporters and in the press to project a masculine, strongman image, particularly after facing down Conservative Party rebels over the issue of Europe.
- Honest John, used to refer to Major's supposed reputation as an honest and down-to-earth politician.

=== Tony Blair ===
Tony Blair's Special Relationship with the president of the United States, George W. Bush, gained him the nickname "America's Poodle".

- Tony, a shortening of his first name Anthony, used in an official capacity by Blair.
- Tony Blur, used during his time in opposition to describe his "clear image" but not what he stood for.
- Bambi, after the title character of Bambi, a Life in the Woods; Blair had been the youngest prime minister for nearly 200 years.
- Bliar, associated with the Iraq War. Blair was accused of misleading parliament and the country over weapons of mass destruction.
- America's Poodle, a reference to his Special Relationship with the President of the United States, George W. Bush.
- Teflon Tony, a reference to his perceived ability to avoid scandals and criticisms 'sticking to him'. Polytetrafluoroethylene (commonly known by the brand name Teflon) is a chemical that is often used to coat non-stick pans.
- Tonibler/Tonibljer, a Kosovan given name derived from Tony Blair due to his role in ending the Kosovo War, but also occasionally used as a nickname for Blair himself mostly in Serbian media.

== 21st century ==
=== Gordon Brown ===
- Flash Gordon, in reference to the comic strip hero Flash Gordon.
- Big Clunking Fist, first used by Tony Blair during his final Queen's Speech debate, it was later used by columnists throughout the British media.
  - Great Clunking Fist, a common misquote.
- Bottler Brown, used in relation to Brown not calling an election in 2007 after previously suggesting he would.
- Golden Brown, as Chancellor, Brown sold 60% of the UK's gold reserves, at a time when gold prices were at a 20-year low, which was widely criticised. Used by Terry Wogan and the TOGs, normally followed by Wogan saying "Never a frown with Golden Brown", a reference to the song "Golden Brown" by The Stranglers.
- Gordo. The word means 'fat' in Spanish.
- Great Leader and Stalin, often sarcastically used by Andrew Neil on This Week in relation to Lord Turnbull's description of Brown as a man who operates with "Stalinist ruthlessness". The fortnightly satirical magazine Private Eye also had a mock Stalinist decree each issue, Prime Ministerial Decree.
- Squatter in No. 10, used as Brown was not elected and after Brown attempted to form a coalition with the Liberal Democrats following the 2010 general election.

=== David Cameron ===
- Dave, Cameron is reported to be known to friends and family as "Dave" rather than David, although he invariably uses the latter name in public.
- DVD Dave, Cameron was reportedly known as DVD Dave because of his love of DVD boxed sets which he enjoyed with his wife Samantha.
- Flashman, a reference to fictional upper-class bully Harry Flashman, used by Ed Miliband during a PMQs debate on reform to the NHS.
- Call Me Dave, used since the publishing of his 2015 biography Call Me Dave.
- Hameron, in reference to the "Piggate" allegations.
- Dodgy Dave, a nickname trending on social media with the #DodgyDave hashtag after Labour MP Dennis Skinner was sent out of the House of Commons in April 2016 for referring to Cameron as "Dodgy Dave" and repeating it after being instructed to withdraw it by Speaker John Bercow. This came about during the Panama Papers scandal.
- DC, a shorthand form he signs off his messages with.

=== Theresa May ===
- Mummy or Mummy May, affectionately used by Conservative activists to make reference to her matriarchal powers, although she had no children.
- Bloody Difficult Woman, originally used by Kenneth Clarke to describe May while preparing for an interview with Sky News, not realising that he was being recorded.
- Submarine May, originally used by Downing Street aides to describe May hiding away "like a submarine" during the EU referendum campaign.
- Theresa Maybe, used to describe her apparent indecisiveness and vagueness, such as her use of the phrase 'Brexit means Brexit'.
- Theresa the Appeaser, originally used to describe her relationship with U.S. President Donald Trump, particularly after Trump's signing of Executive Order 13769 known as the 'travel ban'. It has also been used since to describe her relationships with other world leaders.
- Maybot, used to describe her 'robotic' nature, particularly during the 2017 general election campaign, from which she gained notoriety for frequently repeating campaign slogans such as "strong and stable leadership".
- Teflon Theresa, used to describe her ability to avoid scandals whilst in the politically sensitive position of Home Secretary.
- Lino, short for "Leader in name only", used during the Brexit process in reference to May's difficulty in passing her negotiated withdrawal agreement through the House of Commons and her perceived lack of authority as prime minister and leader of the Conservative Party.

=== Boris Johnson ===
- Al, used by his friends and family as a shortening of his legal first name Alexander.
- Boris, Johnson has been described as one of the few politicians to be more commonly referred to by his given name than his last name.
- BoJo, a portmanteau of his forename and surname. Often used by the press internationally.
- BoJo the Clown, a pun on Bozo the Clown, a more pejorative form of the nickname "BoJo".
- BoZo, a pejorative variation of BoJo (see bozo).
- Bozza, an affectionate name used by his friends.
- Beano Boris or Boris the Menace, coined by the satirical magazine Private Eye which depicted Johnson as a blond-haired version of Dennis the Menace from The Beano.
- British Trump or Britain Trump, used to refer to his perceived similarities with U.S. President Donald Trump.
- Buffoon Boris, Bumbling Boris or the Clown Prince, in reference to Johnson's supposed ability to provide amusement through inappropriate appearance or behaviour, as well as his propensity for making off-colour remarks.
- The Blonde Bombshell, a reference to Johnson's hair colour.
- Greased piglet, a term used to describe him by David Cameron and subsequently by print media.

=== Liz Truss ===
- Liz, a shortening of Truss's middle name Elizabeth, is a nickname Truss uses in an official capacity. Truss has been known by her middle name from an early age, rather than her forename Mary.
- Disruptor-in-Chief, a nickname coined by Truss herself in 2018, describing how she would work as Chief Secretary to the Treasury in tackling bureaucracy in the civil service.
- Haggis Basher, a term used by her schoolmates, making fun of her Paisley Glaswegian accent after she moved from Scotland to England.
- Human hand grenade, supposedly coined by Dominic Cummings as "she does tend to blow things up".
- Queen of Instagram, a nickname used to describe her frequent use of social media, and particularly Instagram, in creating her public image. While international trade secretary, the department was nicknamed by her aides as the 'Department for Instagramming Truss'.
- Radon Liz, a nickname used by opponents, with the explanation that "she’s a gas [i.e. humorous, or insubstantial], but she’s inert".
- The Iron Weathercock, a nickname likely coined by French newspaper Les Echos, comparing her changing views on Brexit to a weathercock turning with the wind. Truss supported the Remain side before the Brexit referendum but became a staunch advocate of Brexit afterwards.
- The Truss, a nickname Truss is reported to have used for herself.
- Lettuce Liz/Lettuce, a reference to a joke in the Daily Star asking whether her premiership and leadership would outlast the shelf life of a lettuce, which she did not.

=== Rishi Sunak ===
- Dishy Rishi, a term used in reference to the Eat Out to Help Out scheme implemented in his tenure as Chancellor of the Exchequer during the COVID-19 pandemic, and also in reference to his supposed handsomeness.
- Dr Death, the Chancellor or Dr Death, a nickname used by government health advisors to refer to Sunak's drive to maintain economic activity as Chancellor of the Exchequer during the COVID-19 pandemic, which they blamed for increasing COVID-19 infections. Believed to have been coined by Ministry of Defence chief scientific advisor Angela McLean in reference to the Eat Out to Help Out scheme which is believed to have increased the COVID-19 infection rate from 8 percent to 17 percent.
- Fishy Rishi, a nickname in reference to Partygate and a number of other scandals he was involved in during his time in government.
- Yorkshire Maharajah or Maharaja of the Yorkshire Dales, a nickname referring to Sunak's Indian heritage, his wealth, and his being an MP for Richmond, a parliamentary constituency in the Yorkshire Dales.
- Will from The Inbetweeners, a nickname that became popular online based on his similar voice as well as appearance to the character of Will McKenzie from sitcom The Inbetweeners, played by Simon Bird.
- Russhi Sunak, a nickname used by former prime minister Liz Truss to criticise Sunak's alleged inaction against Vladimir Putin over the Russian invasion of Ukraine.
- Inaction Man, a nickname originally used by Keir Starmer to refer to Sunak's alleged failure to prevent several crises which occurred under his government, including the prison escape of Daniel Khalife, the reinforced autoclaved aerated concrete crisis and an increase in English Channel migrant crossings.

=== Keir Starmer ===
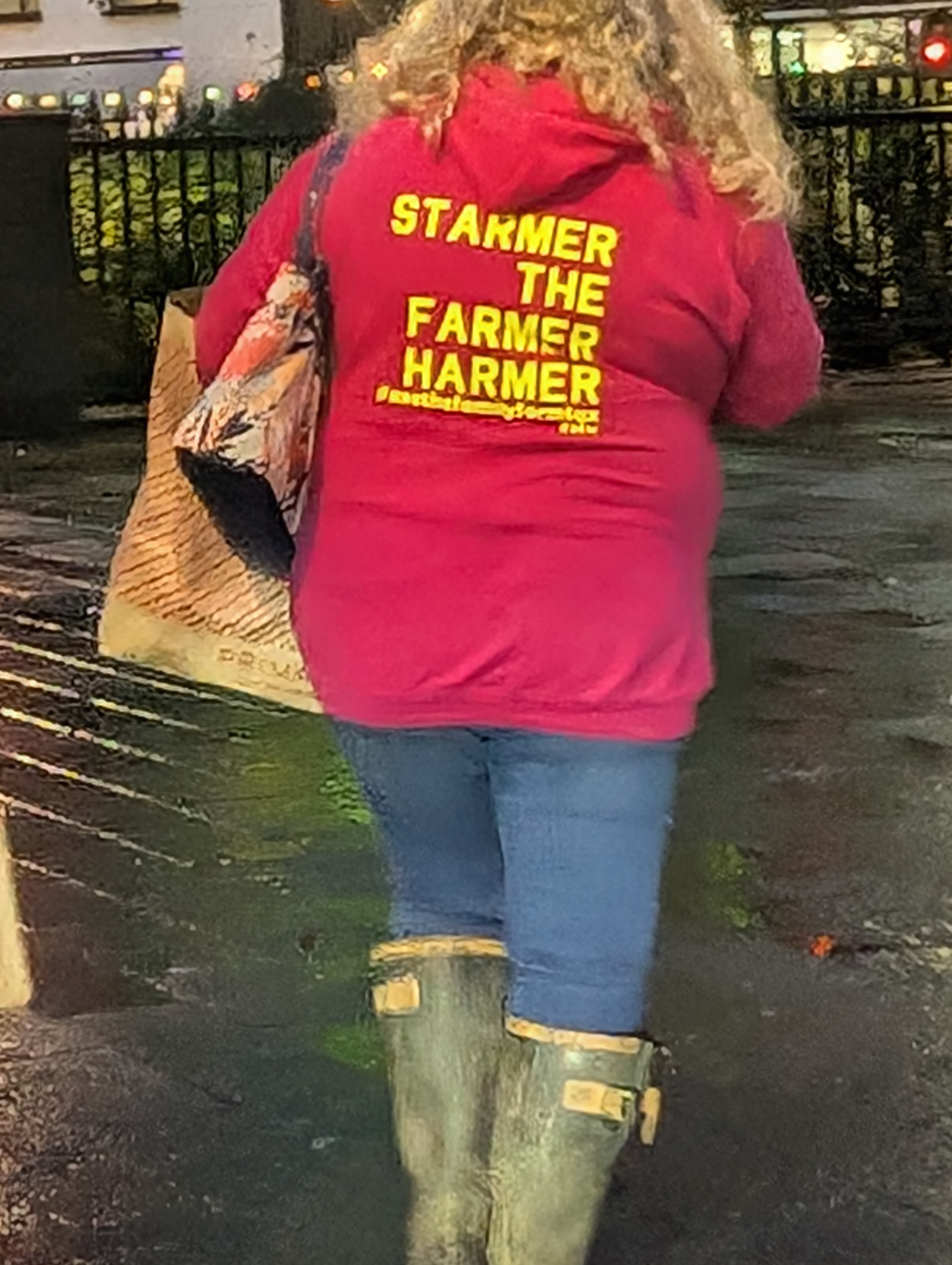
Woman wearing jumper reading "Starmer the Farmer Harmer" during farmer protests in November 2024

- Keith, a nickname used by those on the left of the Labour Party to refer to Starmer's shift to the centre, to disassociate him with Labour's first leader Keir Hardie, whom Starmer is thought to have been named after. The nickname has also been used to refer to Starmer's image and perceived lack of personality.
- Special K, a personal nickname which was from his visit to a Kellogg's factory.
- Mr Rules, a nickname used by supporters to contrast Starmer's background as a lawyer with the controversial legal conduct of prime ministers Boris Johnson and Rishi Sunak.
- Sir Beer Korma, a name originally used by Boris Johnson, in reference to the Beergate controversy.
- Sir Kid Starver, used to refer to Labour's refusal, under Starmer's leadership, to scrap the two-child benefit cap. as well as his support for Israel in the Gaza war and perceived inaction in the Gaza Strip famine.
- Sir Softy/Softie, coined by Rishi Sunak to refer to Starmer's apparent "softness" on crime, with Labour under his leadership having voted against Conservative sentencing reforms.
- Captain Hindsight, a reference to the South Park character of the same name, frequently used by Johnson. The nickname was first used by Johnson in response to Starmer accusing him of blaming care workers for the spread of COVID-19, with Johnson joking that Starmer had an advanced knowledge on how the disease could be transmitted. The nickname was later used by Liz Truss and Rishi Sunak.
- Queer Harmer, used by those opposed to his stance on LGBT and particularly transgender rights.
- Two-tier Keir, a nickname given to Starmer in response to claims of two-tier policing, later popularised by X (Twitter) owner Elon Musk.
- Free Gear Keir, a nickname given to Starmer in reference to the controversy involving gifts to the prime minister and his wife from wealthy businessman Waheed Alli.
- Starmer the Farmer Harmer or Farmer Harmer Starmer, a pejorative nickname used in the 2024–2025 farmers' protests against planned inheritance tax changes announced in the October 2024 budget delivered by Starmer's government.
- Never Here Keir, a nickname referring to Starmer's frequent travels abroad as Prime Minister.

=== Andy Burnham ===
- Andy, a shortening of his first name Andrew, used in an official capacity.
- Bambi Burnham, an affectionate nickname referring to his apparent youthful appearance and dark eyebrows.
- King of the North, originating from his time as Mayor of Greater Manchester. Burnham was dubbed "King of the North" by the media for his campaigning to secure more furlough funding during the COVID-19 pandemic.
- Messiah Without a Mandate, a nickname given to Burnham as a reference to his popularity within the Labour Party and his attempt at reviving their popularity with the electorate, whilst also acknowledging that he has not won an election.

== See also ==
- Prime Minister parodies (Private Eye)
- List of nicknames of prime ministers of Australia
- List of nicknames of prime ministers of Italy
- List of nicknames of presidents of the United States
