= Keir Starmer =

Prime Minister of the United Kingdom from 2024 to 2026

The Right Honourable Sir Keir Starmer KCB KC
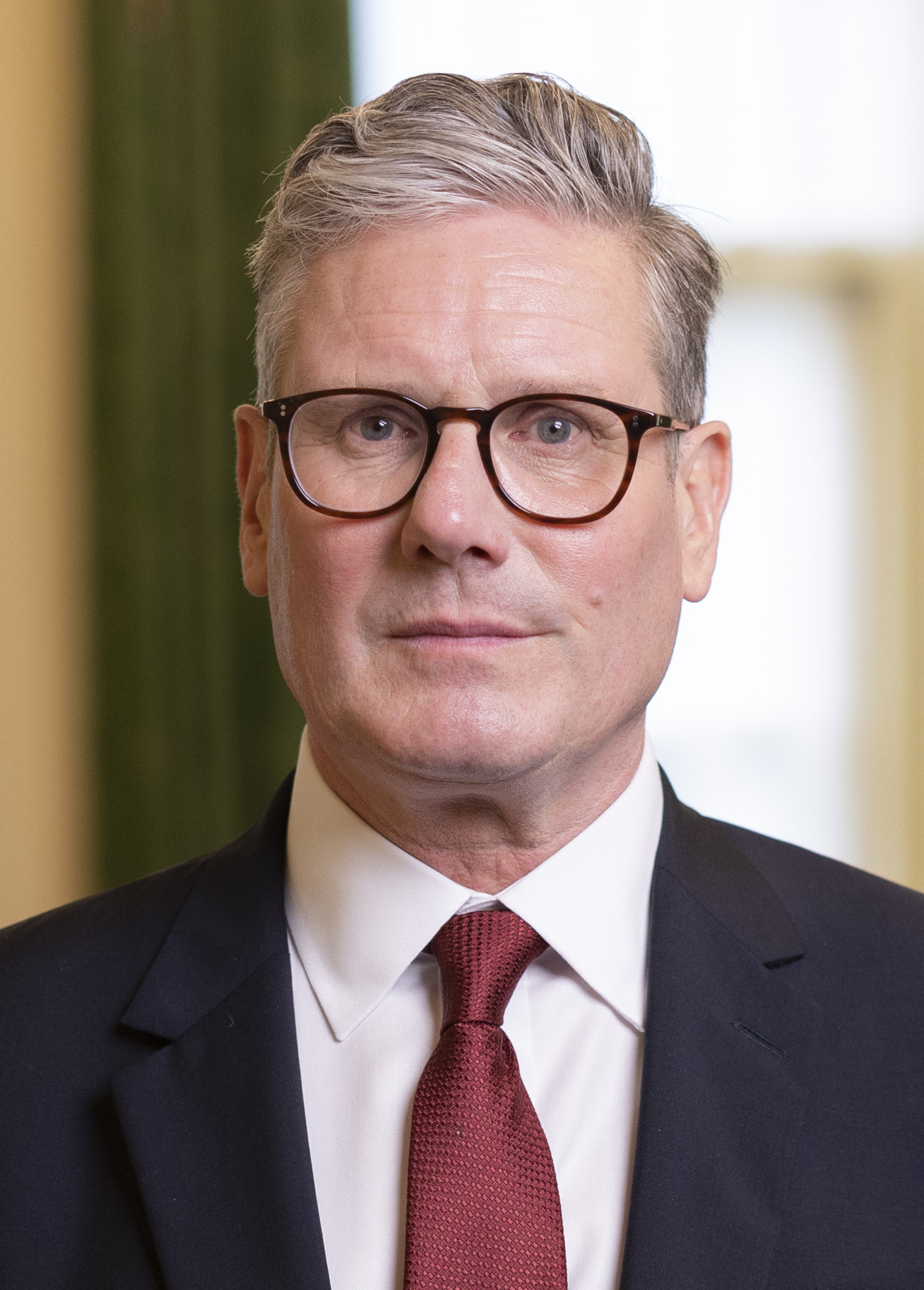
- Official portrait, 2024

Prime Minister of the United Kingdom
- In office 5 July 2024 – 20 July 2026
- Monarch: Charles III
- Deputy: Angela Rayner; David Lammy
- Preceded by: Rishi Sunak
- Succeeded by: Andy Burnham

Leader of the Opposition
- In office 4 April 2020 – 5 July 2024
- Monarchs: Elizabeth II; Charles III
- Prime Minister: Boris Johnson; Liz Truss; Rishi Sunak
- Deputy: Angela Rayner
- Preceded by: Jeremy Corbyn
- Succeeded by: Rishi Sunak

Leader of the Labour Party
- In office 4 April 2020 – 17 July 2026
- Deputy: Angela Rayner; Lucy Powell
- Preceded by: Jeremy Corbyn
- Succeeded by: Andy Burnham
Shadow portfolios
Shadow Secretary of State for Exiting the European Union
In office 6 October 2016 – 4 April 2020
Leader	Jeremy Corbyn
Preceded by	Emily Thornberry
Succeeded by	Office abolished
Shadow Minister for Immigration
In office 18 September 2015 – 27 June 2016
Leader	Jeremy Corbyn
Preceded by	David Hanson
Succeeded by	Afzal Khan

Member of Parliament for Holborn and St Pancras
- In office 7 May 2015 – 1 September 2026
- Preceded by: Frank Dobson
- Succeeded by: Sagal Abdi-Wali

Director of Public Prosecutions
- In office 1 November 2008 – 1 November 2013
- Appointed by: The Baroness Scotland
- Preceded by: Ken Macdonald
- Succeeded by: Alison Saunders

Personal details
- Born: Keir Rodney Starmer; 2 September 1962 (age 64) Southwark, London, England
- Party: Labour
- Spouse: Victoria Alexander (m. 2007)
- Children: 2
- Education: University of Leeds (LLB); St Edmund Hall, Oxford (BCL)
- Website: keirstarmer.com
- Keir Starmer's voice Starmer's first speech as prime minister Recorded on 5 July 2024

Sir Keir Rodney Starmer (Note: /ˈkɪər/ KEER) (born 2 September 1962) is a British politician and lawyer who served as Prime Minister of the United Kingdom from 2024 to 2026. He was Leader of the Labour Party from 2020 to 2026 and Leader of the Opposition from 2020 to 2024. He was the member of Parliament (MP) for Holborn and St Pancras from 2015 to 2026. Before entering politics, he was a barrister and served as Director of Public Prosecutions from 2008 to 2013.

Born in Southwark, London, and raised in Surrey, Starmer was politically active for the Labour Party Young Socialists as a teenager. He graduated as a Bachelor of Laws from the University of Leeds in 1985 and received a Bachelor of Civil Law degree as a member of St Edmund Hall, Oxford, in 1986. After being called to the bar, Starmer worked predominantly in criminal defence, specialising in human rights. He was a human rights adviser to the Northern Ireland Policing Board and became a Queen's Counsel in 2002. During his tenure as Director of Public Prosecutions, the cases he handled included the Stephen Lawrence murder. In the 2014 New Year Honours, he was appointed a Knight Commander of the Order of the Bath (KCB) for services to law and criminal justice.

Starmer was elected to the House of Commons at the 2015 general election. He supported the Remain campaign in the 2016 European Union membership referendum and advocated for a second referendum on Brexit. He served under Jeremy Corbyn as Shadow Brexit Secretary and, following Corbyn's resignation after Labour's defeat at the 2019 general election, Starmer won the 2020 party leadership election. As Leader of the Opposition, he moved the Labour Party towards the political centre and claimed to have eliminated antisemitism within the party, but was criticised for breaking his leadership campaign pledges. His party made significant gains at the 2023 and 2024 local elections despite a drop in membership.

Starmer led Labour to a landslide victory at the 2024 general election, ending 14 years of Conservative government with the smallest national vote share of any majority government since record-keeping began in 1830. Under Starmer's premiership, his government ended Winter Fuel Payments for some pensioners, implemented an early-release scheme for prisoners to decrease prison overcrowding, and launched a National Violent Disorder Programme following nationwide riots in 2024. Starmer restricted visa conditions, closed legal migration routes, and launched the Border Security Command. His government also established Great British Energy, decriminalised abortion by the pregnant woman herself in England and Wales, and announced changes to workers' and renters' rights, an increase in the minimum wage and investment in a new nuclear power station. In foreign policy, Starmer continued support for Ukraine in the Russo-Ukrainian war and limited support for Israel in Gaza while formally recognising the State of Palestine. His government negotiated free trade agreements with India, the European Union and the United States, and sought to improve relations with China.

Starmer proved unpopular with the British public. His net approval rating began slightly positive but fell over the course of his premiership to an average of −46% by November 2025; an Ipsos poll that month indicates he was the least popular prime minister since its records began in 1977. Under Starmer's leadership, the Labour Party suffered deepening unpopularity and a left-wing exodus to the Green Party. Labour saw record electoral losses during the 2025 and May 2026 local elections, which culminated in a leadership crisis and Starmer's decision to resign, which he announced on 22 June. After a leadership election, he resigned on 20 July 2026 and was succeeded by Andy Burnham. On 1 September 2026, he resigned as an MP, triggering the 2026 Holborn and St Pancras by-election.

== Early life ==
Keir Rodney Starmer was born on 2 September 1962 in Southwark, south-east London, and raised in Oxted, Surrey. He is the second of four children of Josephine (née Baker), a nurse, and Rodney Starmer, a toolmaker. His mother developed Still's disease. She attended St John's Anglican Church in nearby Hurst Green, while his father was an atheist. He was nominally "brought up Church of England". His parents were both Labour Party supporters, and reputedly named him after the party's first parliamentary leader, Keir Hardie, although Starmer did not confirm this when asked in 2015.

Starmer passed the 11-plus examination and gained entry to Reigate Grammar School, which at the time was a voluntary-aided selective grammar school. The school converted into an independent fee-paying school in 1976, while he was a student. The terms of the conversion were such that his parents were not required to pay for his schooling until he turned 16, and when he reached that point, the school, by now a charity, awarded him a bursary that allowed him to complete his education there without any parental contribution. The subjects he chose to study in the sixth form during his last two years at school were mathematics, music, and physics, in which he achieved A level grades of B, B, and C. Among his classmates at Reigate were the musician Norman Cook (Fatboy Slim), with whom Starmer took violin lessons; Andrew Cooper, who later became a Conservative peer; and the future conservative journalist Andrew Sullivan. According to Starmer, he and Sullivan "fought over everything ... Politics, religion. You name it."

== Legal career ==
After being called to the bar, Starmer worked predominantly in criminal defence, specialising in human rights. He served as a human rights adviser to the Northern Ireland Policing Board, taking silk as a Queen's Counsel in 2002. During his tenure as Director of Public Prosecutions and head of the Crown Prosecution Service, he handled major cases including the Stephen Lawrence murder case. In the 2014 New Year Honours, he was appointed a Knight Commander of the Order of the Bath (KCB) for services to law and criminal justice.

Starmer became a barrister in 1987 at the Middle Temple, then a bencher in 2009. He served as a legal officer for the campaign group Liberty until 1990. After joining the Haldane Society of Socialist Lawyers, he was its secretary (1988–92), treasurer (1992–95) and executive committee member (1996–99). As part of his involvement in the Haldane Society, he joined an academic trip to the Soviet Union on the eve of its collapse in 1991, meeting the Russian chief justice Vyacheslav Lebedev, led the society's delegation to Northern Ireland during the Troubles, and organised the UK delegation to the 14th Congress of the International Association of Democratic Lawyers in Cape Town in 1996, meeting President Nelson Mandela. Starmer joined the newly founded Doughty Street Chambers in 1990 and worked primarily on human rights matters.

Starmer has been called to the Bar in several Caribbean countries, where he defended convicts sentenced to the death penalty. In 1999, he was a junior barrister on Lee Clegg's appeal. Starmer assisted Helen Steel and David Morris in the McLibel case, at the trial and appeal in English courts, also representing them before the European Court of Human Rights. Starmer was appointed Queen's Counsel on 9 April 2002, aged 39. In the same year, he became joint head of Doughty Street Chambers. In 2005 Starmer called his Queen's Counsel appointment "odd" as he had previously expressed support for the abolition of the monarchy.

Starmer wrote legal opinions and marched in protest against the Iraq War following the 2003 invasion of Iraq, and said in 2015 that he believed the war was "not lawful under international law because there was no UN resolution expressly authorising it". He defended one of the Fairford Five who broke into the RAF Fairford military air base in 2003 and disabled equipment in order to disrupt military operations at the start of the Iraq War.

== Human rights defender ==
Starmer served as a human rights defender to the Northern Ireland Policing Board and the Association of Chief Police Officers, and was also a member of the Foreign, Commonwealth and Development Office's Death Penalty Advisory Panel from 2002 to 2008. The Northern Ireland Board was an important part of bringing communities together following the Good Friday Agreement, and Starmer later cited his work on policing in Northern Ireland as being a key influence on his decision to pursue a political career: "Some of the things I thought that needed to change in police services we achieved more quickly than we achieved in strategic litigation ... I came better to understand how you can change by being inside and getting the trust of people".

Starmer represented Croatia at the genocide hearings before the International Court of Justice at The Hague in 2014, arguing that Serbia wanted to seize a third of Croatian territory during the Croatian War of Independence and eradicate the Croatian population.

== Director of Public Prosecutions ==
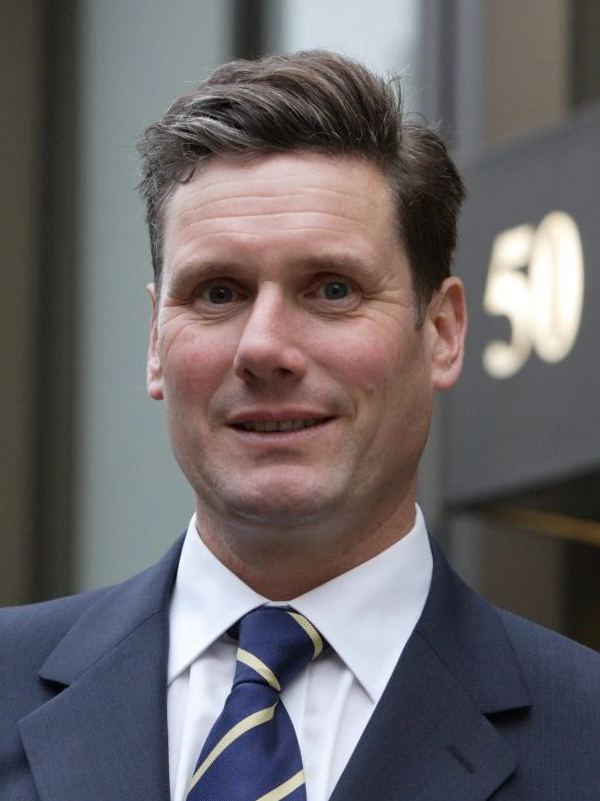
Official portrait as Director of Public Prosecutions, 2009

In July 2008 Baroness Scotland, the Attorney General for England and Wales, named Starmer as the new Head of the Crown Prosecution Service (CPS) and Director of Public Prosecutions (DPP). He succeeded Ken Macdonald, who publicly welcomed Starmer's appointment, on 1 November 2008. Starmer was deemed to be bringing a focus on human rights into the legal system. In 2011 he introduced changes that included the "first test paperless hearing". During his time as DPP Starmer dealt with a number of major cases including the Stephen Lawrence murder case, where he brought his murderers to justice.

The United states attorney general Eric Holder reportedly secured Starmer's support for the extradition of the Scottish IT expert Gary McKinnon, who in 2001 had hacked into US military databases looking for information on Unidentified Flying Objects (UFOs), on an interdict that could have led to a seventy-year jail sentence. The extradition was eventually blocked by Theresa May during her premiership.

In February 2010, Starmer announced the CPS's decision to prosecute three Labour MPs and a Conservative peer for offences relating to false accounting in the aftermath of the parliamentary expenses scandal; all were found guilty. Starmer prioritised rapid prosecutions of rioters over long sentences during the 2011 England riots, which he later concluded helped to bring "the situation back under control". In February 2012 Starmer announced that Chris Huhne would be prosecuted for perverting the course of justice, stating in relation to the case that "[w]here there is sufficient evidence we do not shy away from prosecuting politicians".

In 2012 the journalist Nick Cohen published allegations that Starmer was personally responsible for allowing the prosecution of Paul Chambers to proceed, in what became known as the "Twitter joke trial". The CPS denied that Starmer was behind the decision, saying that it was the responsibility of a Crown Court and was out of Starmer's hands. When Jimmy Savile's sexual abuse crimes were exposed in 2012, Starmer said amid the subsequent scandal that "It was like a dam had bust and people rightfully wanted to know why he had been allowed to get away with it for so long." In 2013 Starmer announced changes to how sexual abuse investigations were to be handled amid Operation Yewtree, including a panel to review complaints.

Starmer stepped down as Director of Public Prosecutions in November 2013, and was succeeded by Alison Saunders. Starmer was awarded several honorary degrees between 2011 and 2014, and was appointed Knight Commander of the Order of the Bath (KCB) in the 2014 New Year Honours for "services to law and criminal justice".

== Member of Parliament ==
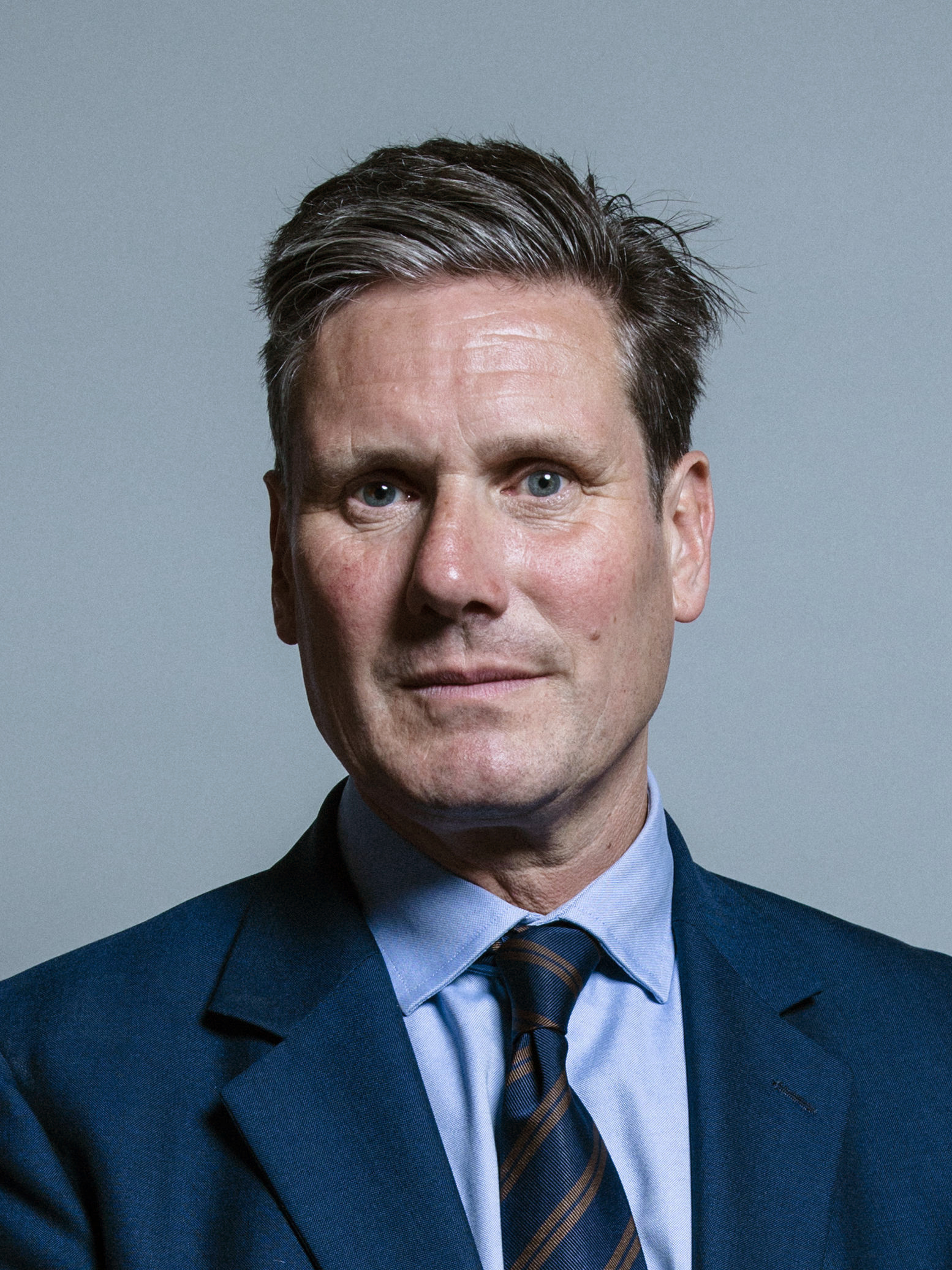
Official portrait as MP, 2017

My predecessor, the Right Hon. Frank Dobson, to whom I pay tribute, was a powerful advocate of the rights of everyone in Holborn and St Pancras throughout his highly distinguished parliamentary career. Widely respected and widely regarded, he served the people of Holborn and St Pancras for 36 years. Although I doubt I will clock up 36 years, I intend to follow in Frank Dobson's footsteps—albeit my jokes are likely to seem tame when compared with his, and I might give the beard a miss.

— Keir Starmer in his maiden speech to the House of Commons, May 2015

Starmer was selected in December 2014 as the Labour parliamentary candidate for the constituency of Holborn and St Pancras, a Labour safe seat, following the decision of Frank Dobson, its sitting MP, to retire. Starmer was elected at the 2015 general election with a majority of 17,048 (receiving 52.9 per cent of the vote). He was returned at the 2017 general election with an increased majority of 30,509 (70.1 per cent) at the 2019 general election with a reduced majority of 27,763 (64.9 per cent), and at the 2024 general election with a further reduced majority of 18,884 (48.9 per cent).

During the 2016 European Union membership referendum, Starmer supported the Britain Stronger in Europe campaign for the UK to remain in the European Union (EU). A member of the parliamentary groups Labour Friends of Israel and Labour Friends of Palestine and the Middle East, Starmer was urged by a number of activists to stand in the 2015 Labour Party leadership election following the resignation of Ed Miliband as Leader of the Labour Party after Labour's defeat at the 2015 general election; he ruled this out, citing his relative lack of political experience at the time. During the leadership election Starmer supported Andy Burnham, who finished second to Jeremy Corbyn.

== Shadow portfolios ==
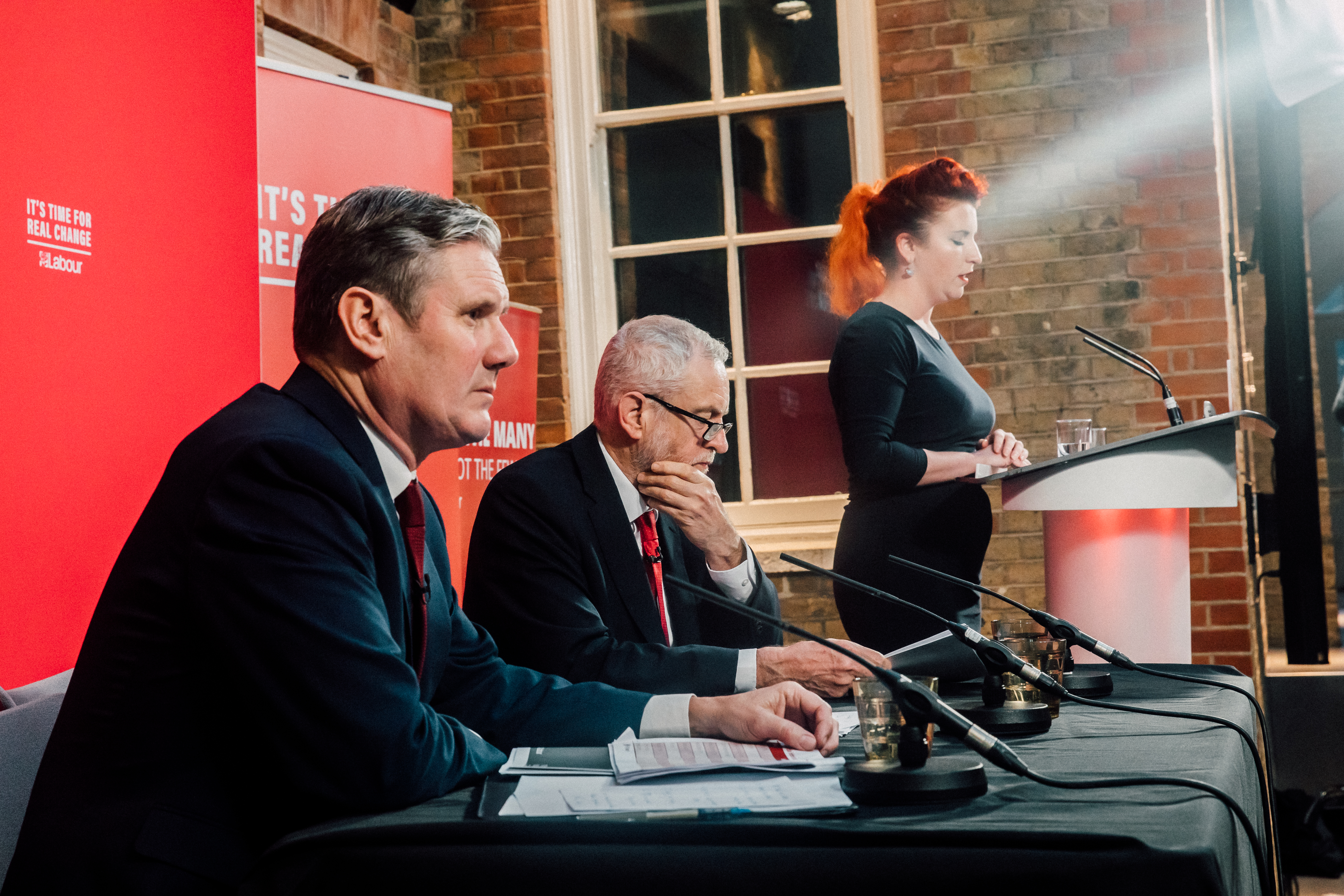
Starmer and Jeremy Corbyn, 6 December 2019

Starmer was appointed to Corbyn's Shadow Cabinet as Shadow Home Office Minister in September 2015. He resigned from this role in June 2016 as part of the mass Shadow Cabinet resignations in protest at Corbyn's leadership following the 2016 EU Referendum result. Following Corbyn's re-election as leader in September 2016, Starmer accepted a new post from Corbyn as Shadow Secretary of State for Exiting the European Union. In this role, Starmer questioned May and her first ministry's destination for the UK outside of the EU, as well as calling for Brexit plans to be made public and supporting a proposed second referendum on Brexit. Following Labour's defeat at the 2019 general election, Corbyn announced that he would not lead Labour at the next general election after "a process of reflection". Starmer began to distance himself from Corbyn's leadership and many of the policies put forward at the general election, later saying in 2024 that he was "certain that we would lose the 2019 election".

== Labour leadership campaign ==
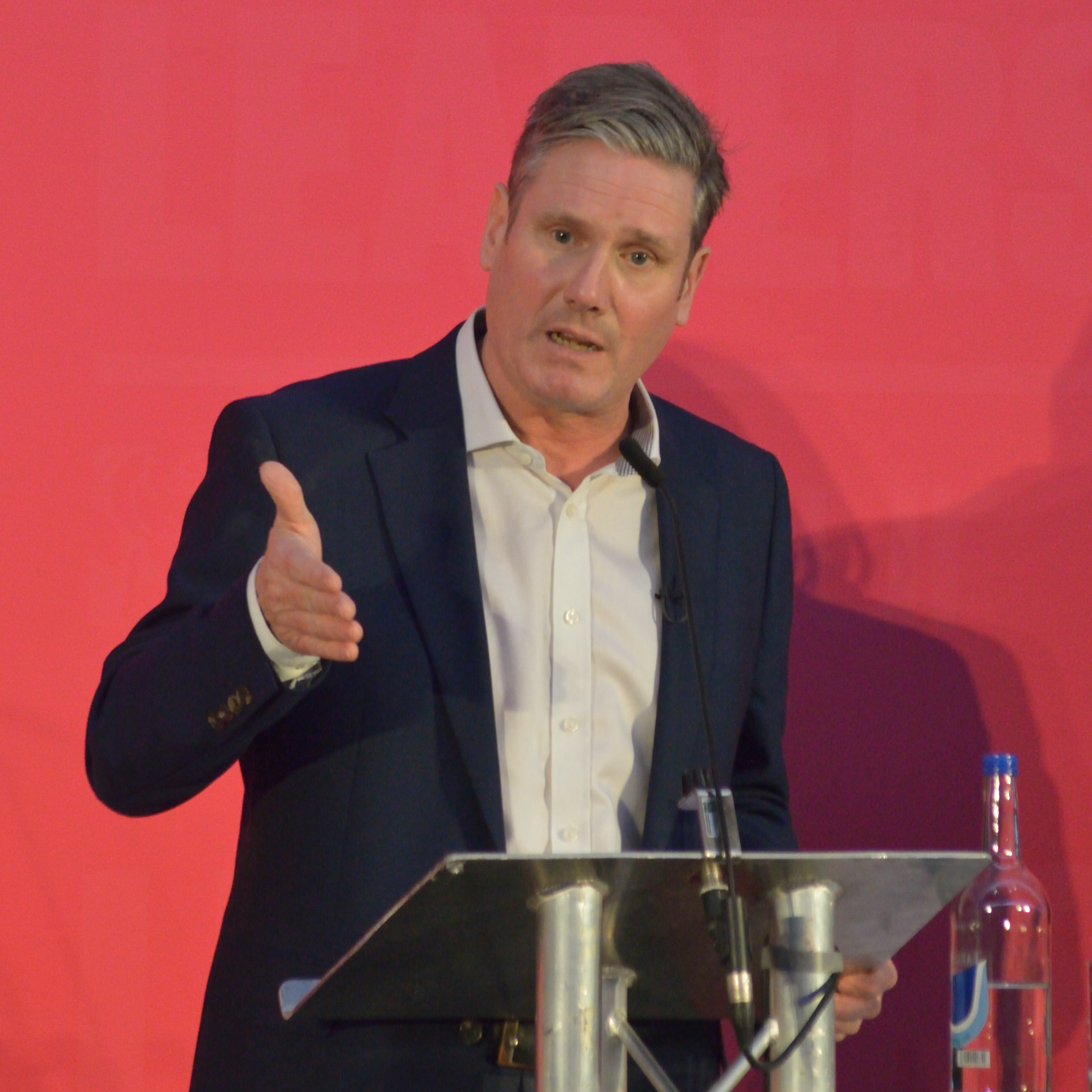
Starmer speaking at a leadership election hustings

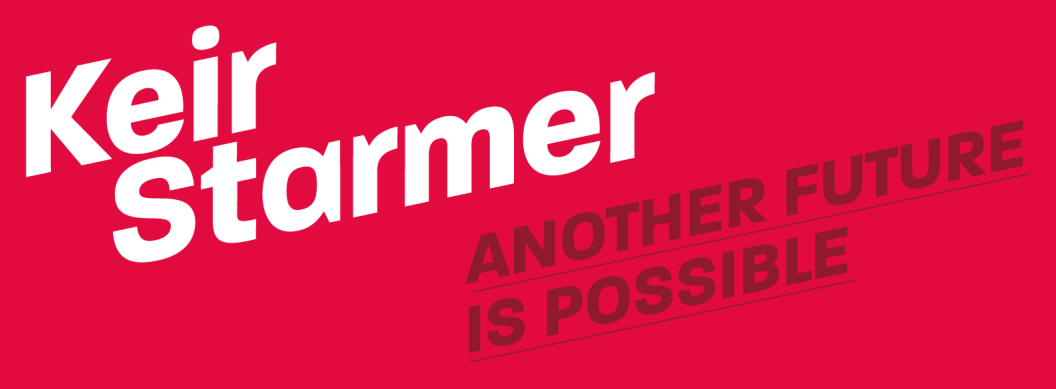
Starmer's logo for the Labour leadership

On 4 January 2020 Starmer announced his candidacy for the resultant leadership election. He gained support from the former Labour prime minister Gordon Brown and London Mayor Sadiq Khan. During the Labour leadership campaign, Starmer ran a left-wing platform and positioned himself in opposition to austerity, stating that Corbyn was right to position Labour as "the party of anti-austerity". He indicated he would continue with the Labour policy of scrapping tuition fees as well as pledging "common ownership" of rail, mail, energy and water companies, and called for ending outsourcing in the NHS, local government and the justice system. Starmer was declared the winner of Labour's leadership contest on 4 April 2020, defeating his rivals, Rebecca Long-Bailey and Lisa Nandy, with 56.2 per cent of the vote in the first round.

It is the honour and the privilege of my life to be elected as Leader of the Labour Party. I want to thank Rebecca and Lisa for running such passionate and powerful campaigns and for their friendship and support along the way. I want to thank our Labour Party staff who worked really hard and my own amazing campaign team, full of positivity, with that unifying spirit. I want to pay tribute to Jeremy Corbyn, who led our party through some really difficult times, who energised our movement and who's a friend as well as a colleague. And to all of our members, supporters and affiliates I say this: whether you voted for me or not I will represent you, I will listen to you and I will bring our party together.

— Keir Starmer's acceptance speech, April 2020

== Leader of the Opposition (2020–2024) ==
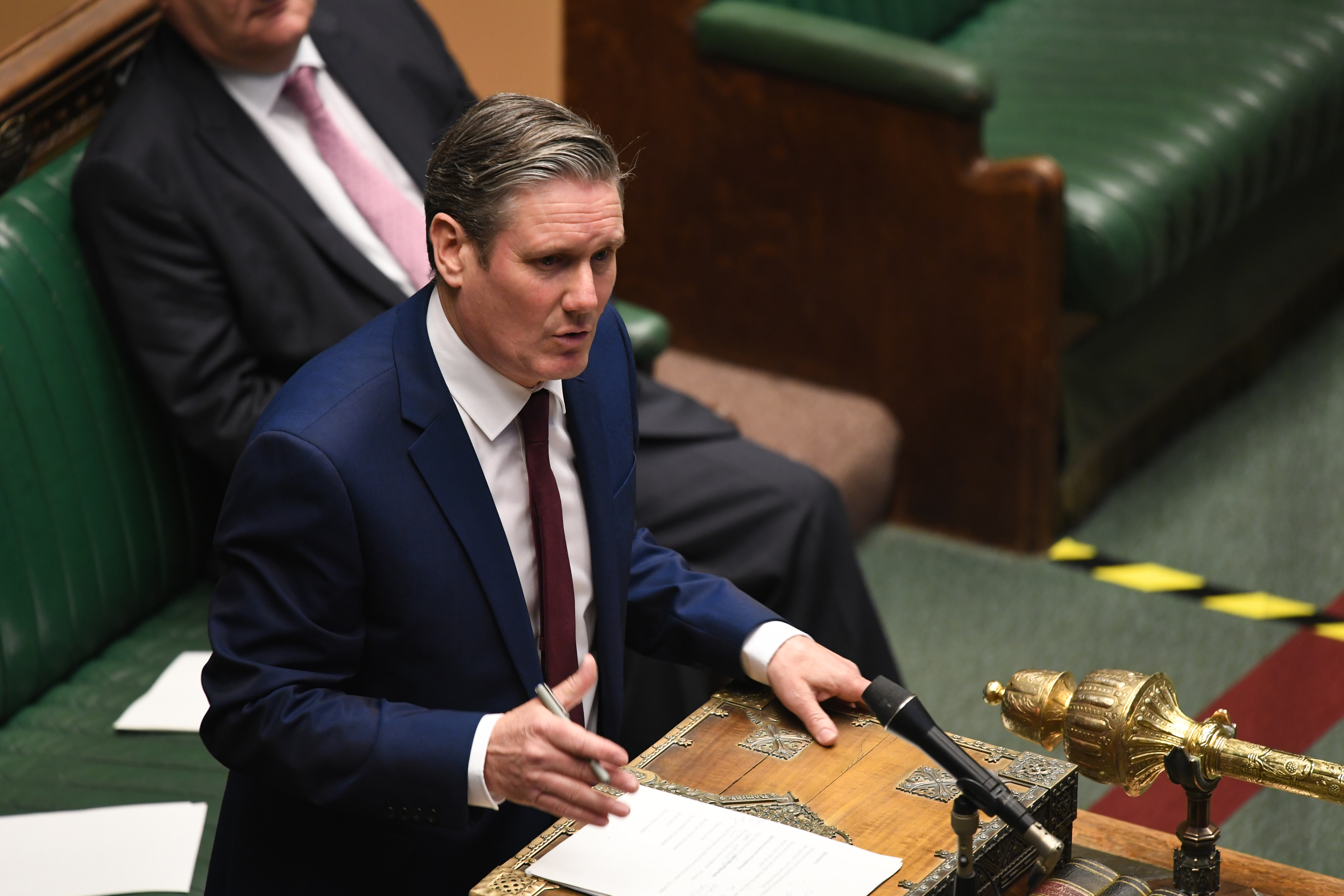
Starmer speaking in the Commons during Prime Minister's Questions, 22 April 2020

Having become Leader of the Opposition during the COVID-19 pandemic, Starmer said in his acceptance speech that he would refrain from "scoring party political points" and would work with the Government "in the national interest". He later became more critical of HM Government's response to the pandemic following the Partygate scandal. On 13 December 2021, during the COVID-19 pandemic in the United Kingdom, Starmer recorded a Christmas message at Waheed Alli, Baron Alli's house, urging the public to work from home, while giving the impression he was in his own home, with a family picture behind him. In May 2022, Starmer said he would resign were he to receive a fixed penalty notice for breaching COVID-19 regulations while campaigning during the run-up to the Hartlepool by-election and local elections the previous year. The controversy surrounding the event was dubbed "Beergate". In July 2022, Durham Police cleared Starmer and said that he had "no case to answer". In the following month, the Parliamentary Commissioner for Standards, Kathryn Stone, found that Starmer had breached the MPs' code of conduct on eight occasions by failing to register interests.

Amidst the historic number of ministers resigning from Boris Johnson's government in July 2022, Starmer proposed a vote of no confidence in the Government, stating that Johnson should not be allowed to remain in office. Starmer also criticised Johnson, as well as his successors Liz Truss and Rishi Sunak, for issues such as the Chris Pincher scandal and the subsequent government crisis, the economic crisis resulting from the 2022 mini-budget and subsequent government crisis, the cost of living crisis, and the industrial disputes and strikes including National Health Service strikes.

As Labour leader Starmer focused on repositioning the Party away from the Left and the controversies that affected Corbyn's leadership, with promises of economic stability, tackling small-boat crossings, cutting NHS waiting times and "rebuilding the NHS", worker rights enrichment, energy independence and infrastructure development, tackling crime, improving education and training, reforming public services, renationalising the railway network, and recruiting 6,500 teachers. Starmer also pledged to end antisemitism within the Labour Party. In October 2020, following the release of the Equality and Human Rights Commission (EHRC)'s report into antisemitism in the Labour Party, Starmer accepted its findings in full and apologised to Jews on the Party's behalf. In February 2023 the EHRC said that changes the party had made to its complaints and training procedures meant that the Labour Party no longer needed to be monitored by them.

In September 2023 he reshuffled his shadow cabinet. Starmer was ranked number two in the New Statesman's Left Power List 2023, below his Shadow Chancellor, Rachel Reeves, but still described as "the overwhelming favourite to be the next Prime Minister". The reshuffle was seen as a promotion of Blairites and demotion of those on the soft left.

During the 2023 Gaza War, Starmer emphasised his support for Israel, stated he would favour military aid to the country, and called the actions of Hamas and other militants terrorism. In an interview with LBC on 11 October 2023, Starmer was asked whether it would be appropriate for Israel to totally cut off power and water supplies to Gaza, with Starmer replying that "I think that Israel does have that right" and that "obviously everything should be done within international law". On 20 October, Starmer clarified that he only meant that Israel had the right to defend itself. Starmer had said that a ceasefire would better allow Hamas to make future attacks; instead, he called for a humanitarian pause to allow aid to reach Gaza.

On 15 November 2023, Starmer suffered his largest defeat as leader when 56 of his MPs (including ten frontbenchers) defied a three-line whip in voting for an SNP motion to support an immediate ceasefire in Gaza. In December 2023, Keir Starmer followed Rishi Sunak in changing his stance by calling for a "sustainable ceasefire" in relation to the conflict in Gaza. This also came after the Foreign Secretary David Cameron's same change in position. Starmer stated his support for a "two-stage" "two-state solution". During Starmer's tenure as leader, Labour saw a drop in party membership from a peak of 532,000 after the 2019 election to 370,450 in the runup to the 2024 election. More than 20,000 members left the party within two months in 2024, with blame placed on the party's stance on the Gazan genocide and green investment.

=== Shadow cabinet ===
Starmer's shadow cabinet initially comprised both the right and left of the Labour Party. Starmer reshuffled his shadow cabinet three times – firstly in May 2021, secondly in November 2021, and finally in September 2023. Starmer's reshuffles reduced the representation of the left and soft left on the opposition frontbench, while increasing the representation of the party's right. Notable changes included Rachel Reeves replacing Anneliese Dodds as Shadow Chancellor, the demotion of Lisa Nandy from Shadow Levelling-Up Secretary to Shadow Minister for International Development, and the replacement of Chief Whip Nick Brown with Alan Campbell. Resignations from Starmer's shadow cabinet included Andy McDonald and Rosena Allin-Khan.

=== Local election results ===
Starmer considered resigning after Labour's mixed results in the 2021 local elections, the first local elections of his leadership, but later felt "vindicated" by his decision to stay on, saying, "I did [consider quitting] because I didn't feel that I should be bigger than the party and that if I couldn't bring about the change, perhaps there should be a change. But actually, in the end, I reflected on it, talked to very many people and doubled down and determined, no, it is the change in the Labour Party we need".

During Starmer's tenure as Opposition Leader, his party suffered the loss of a previously safe Labour seat at the 2021 Hartlepool by-election, followed by holds at the 2021 Batley and Spen by-election, 2022 Birmingham Erdington by-election and 2022 City of Chester by-election, as well as a gain from the Conservatives at the 2022 Wakefield by-election. During the 2023 local elections, Labour gained more than 500 councillors and 22 councils, becoming the largest party in local government for the first time since 2002. Labour made further gains at the 2024 local elections, gaining from the Conservatives at the Blackpool South by-election and narrowly winning the West Midlands mayoral election.

=== 2024 general election ===
On 22 May 2024, Prime Minister Rishi Sunak announced that a general election would be held on 4 July 2024. Labour entered the general election with a large lead over the Conservatives in opinion polls (which had been the case since 2022), and the potential scale of the party's victory remained a topic of discussion throughout the campaign.

In June 2024 Starmer released the Labour Party's 2024 manifesto, Change, which focused on economic growth, planning system changes, infrastructure, what Starmer describes as "clean energy", healthcare, education, childcare, and strengthening workers' rights. It pledged a new publicly owned energy company (Great British Energy), a "Green Prosperity Plan", reducing patient waiting times in the NHS, and renationalisation of the railway network (Great British Railways). Promising wealth creation together with "pro-business and pro-worker" policies, the manifesto also pledged giving 16-year-olds the vote in all elections, reforming the House of Lords, and to tax private schools, with money generated going into improving state education. On taxes, the day after the manifesto was released, Starmer pledged that not only would income tax, National Insurance, and VAT not be increased, but that, per their manifesto, their plans were fully costed and funded and would not require tax increases.

Starmer led Labour to a landslide victory at the general election, characterised by commentators as a "loveless landslide", ending fourteen years of Conservative government with Labour becoming the largest party in the House of Commons. Labour achieved a 174-seat simple majority and a total of 411 seats, the party's third-best ever result in terms of seat-share (following the 1997 and 2001 general elections). The party became the largest in England for the first time since 2005, in Scotland for the first time since 2010 and retained its status as the largest party in Wales. Despite this, Labour won 34 per cent of the vote – the lowest of any party forming a majority government in the post-war era, leading to concerns about the proportionality of the election.

In his victory speech Starmer thanked Labour Party workers for their work – including nearly five years of revamping and rebranding Labour in the face of Conservative dominance – and urged them to savour the moment, but warned them of challenges ahead and pledged his government would seek "national renewal":

We did it! You campaigned for it, you fought for it, you voted for it and now it has arrived. Change begins now. And it feels good, I have to be honest. Four-and-a-half years of work changing the party. This is what it is for – a changed Labour Party ready to serve our country, ready to restore Britain to the service of working people. And across our country people will be waking up to the news, relieved that a weight has been lifted, a burden finally removed from the shoulders of this great nation. And now we can look forward. Walk into the morning, the sunlight of hope, pale at first but getting stronger through the day, shining once again, on a country with the opportunity after 14 years to get its future back. We said we would end the chaos and we will. We said we would turn the page and we have. Today we start the next chapter, begin the work of change, the mission of national renewal and start to rebuild our country.

— Keir Starmer on 5 July 2024, following his general election victory

== Premiership (2024–2026) ==
=== Appointment ===
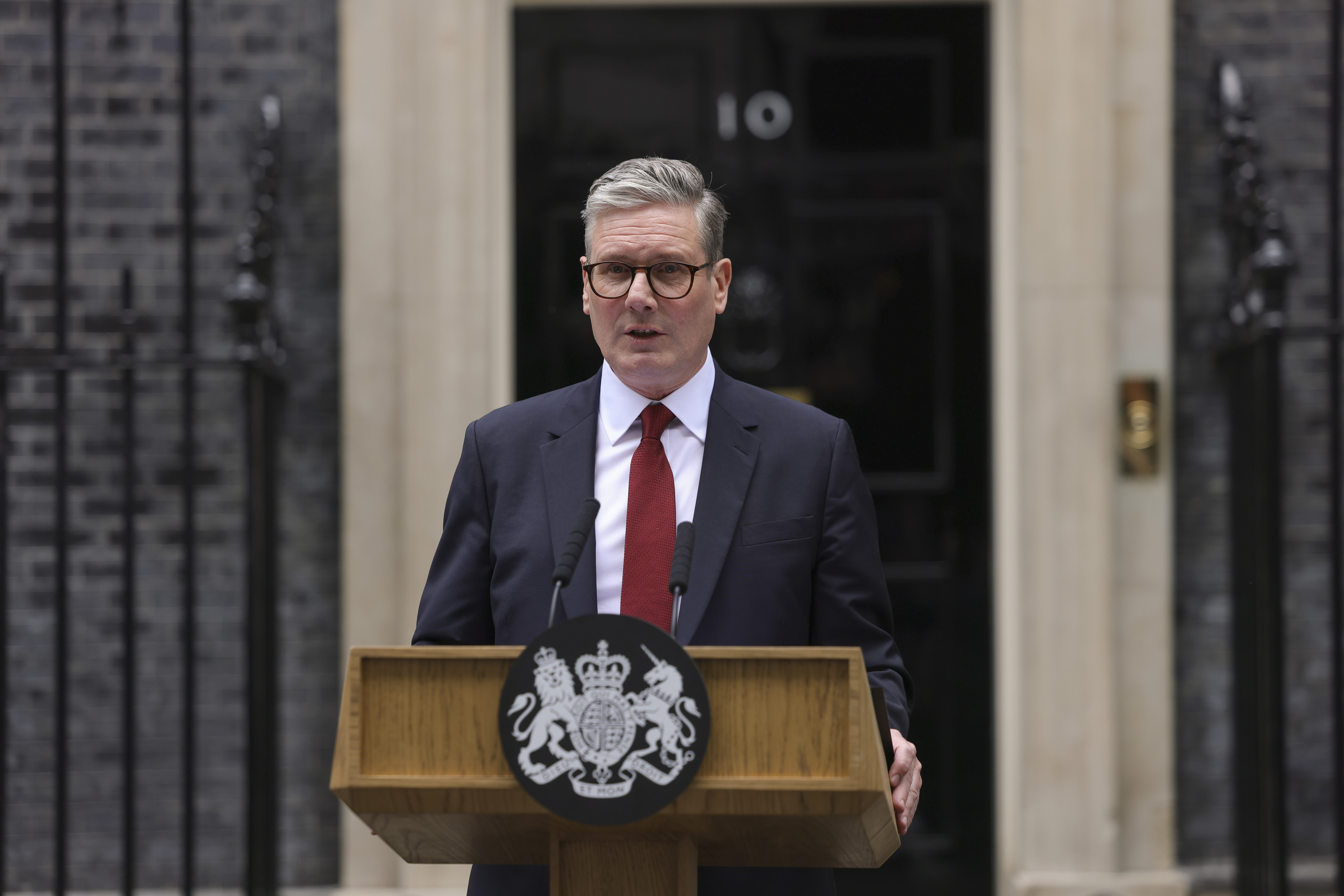
Starmer in Downing Street delivering his first speech as prime minister, 5 July 2024

As the leader of the majority party in the House of Commons, Starmer was appointed prime minister, First Lord of the Treasury and Minister for the Civil Service by King Charles III on 5 July 2024, becoming the first Labour prime minister since Gordon Brown in 2010 and the first one to win a general election since Tony Blair in 2005. He also became the first prime minister to enter office with a knighthood since Alec Douglas-Home. Starmer and his wife, Victoria, were driven from Buckingham Palace to Downing Street. Starmer stopped the car on the way back from the palace to go on a walkabout in Downing Street to meet cheering crowds.

In his first speech as prime minister, Starmer paid tribute to his predecessor, Rishi Sunak, saying "his achievement as the first British Asian prime minister of our country should not be underestimated by anyone" and he also recognised "the dedication and hard work he brought to his leadership", but added that the people of the UK had voted for change:

You have given us a clear mandate, and we will use it to deliver change. To restore service and respect to politics, end the era of noisy performance, tread more lightly on your lives, and unite our country. Four nations, standing together again, facing down, as we have so often in our past, the challenges of an insecure world. Committed to a calm and patient rebuilding. So with respect and humility, I invite you all to join this government of service in the mission of national renewal. Our work is urgent and we begin it today.

Other world leaders, including Joe Biden and Justin Trudeau, as well as Blair and Brown, congratulated Starmer upon his appointment as prime minister. One of his first acts was to declare the Rwanda asylum plan "dead": the Home Secretary, Yvette Cooper, would establish a Border Security Command to tackle smuggling gangs which facilitate illegal migrant crossings over the English Channel. Starmer went on a tour of the four nations of the UK, meeting with leaders including John Swinney, Michelle O'Neill, and Vaughan Gething. He also met the twelve regional mayors and announced the establishment of the Council of the Nations and Regions. On 24 July 2024 he attended his first Prime Minister's Questions in the Commons.

=== Cabinet ===
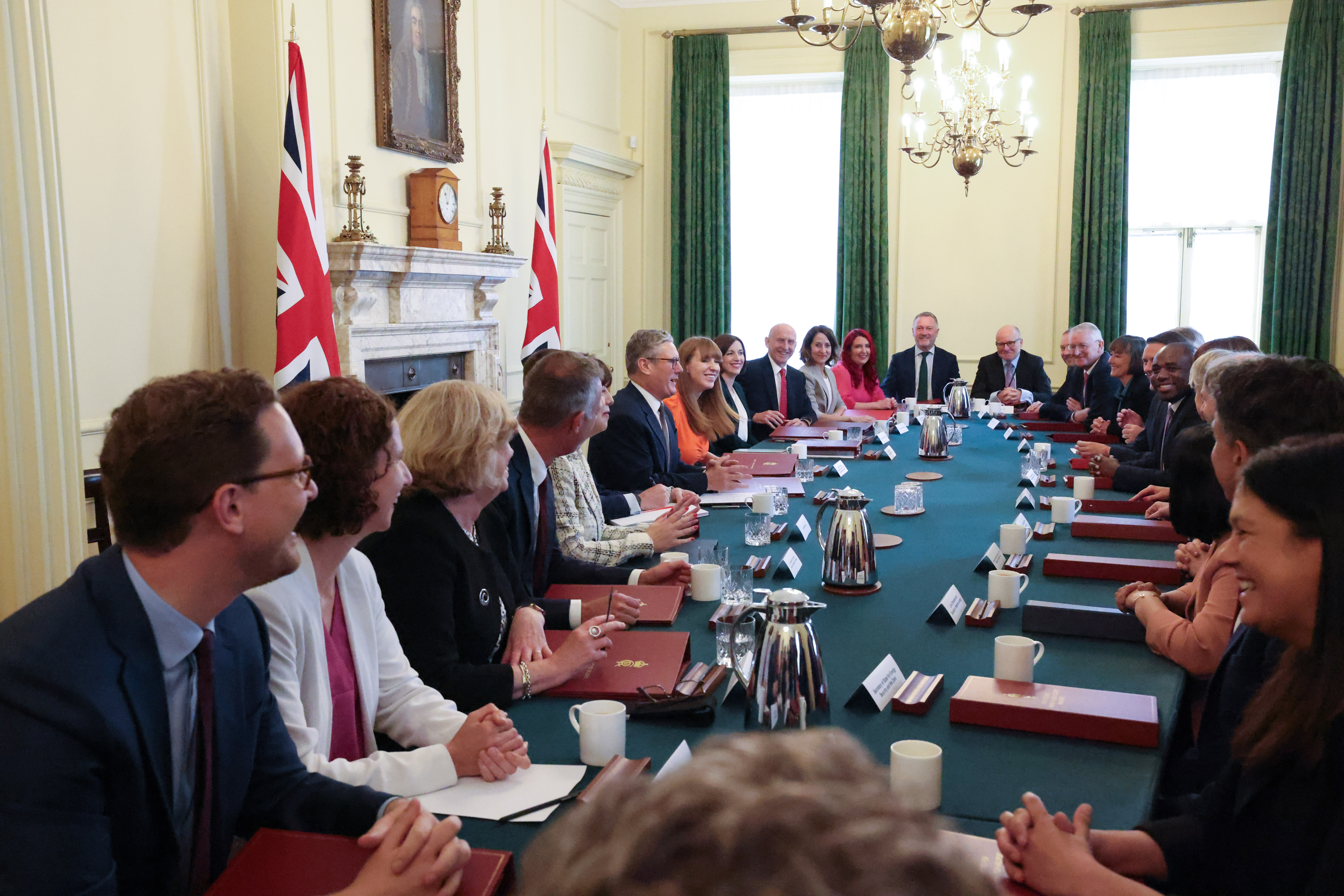
Starmer convening his first Cabinet meeting on 6 July 2024

Starmer set about appointing a new Cabinet, which first met on 6 July, and he completed his ministerial appointments on 7 July. Parliament was then recalled to meet on 9 July. Among Starmer's ministerial appointments were the scientist Patrick Vallance as Minister of State for Science, the rehabilitation campaigner James Timpson as Minister of State for Prisons, Parole and Probation, and the international law expert Richard Hermer as Attorney General for England and Wales, who were created life peers to sit in the House of Lords. The new government also contains a few ministers from the New Labour Blair/Brown governments, including Hilary Benn, Yvette Cooper, David Lammy, and Ed Miliband in Cabinet, and Jacqui Smith and Douglas Alexander as junior ministers.

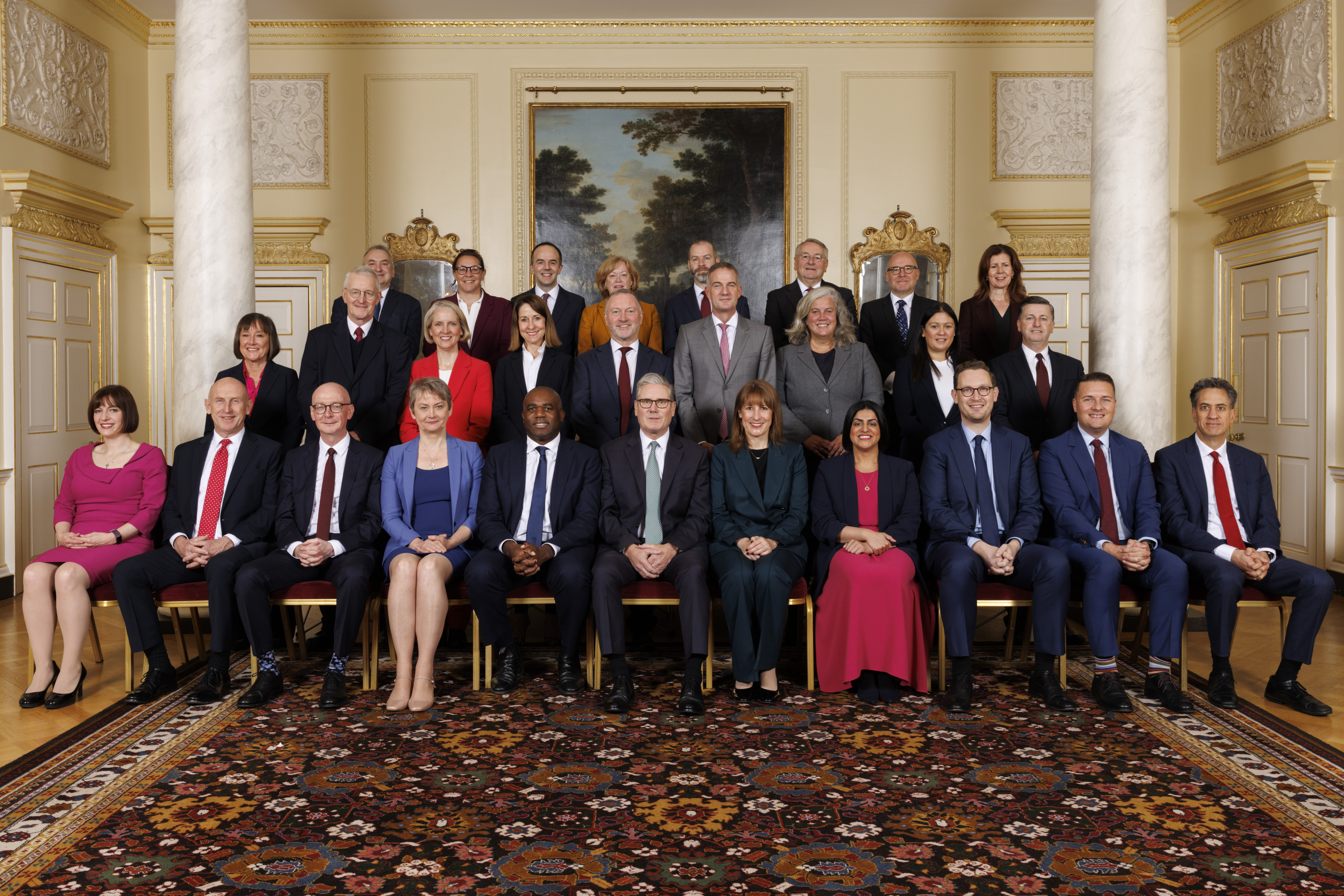
Starmer's reshuffled cabinet in October 2025

In September 2025, Starmer's deputy Angela Rayner resigned over a tax scandal in what was described as a damaging blow to Starmer's leadership. Following Rayner's resignation, Starmer conducted the first major reshuffle of his premiership.

=== Peter Mandelson ===
In December 2024, Starmer appointed Peter Mandelson to serve as British ambassador to the United States. Starmer dismissed Mandelson in September 2025 over his association with Jeffrey Epstein. In February 2026, during Prime Minister's Questions, Starmer said that Mandelson had "lied repeatedly" during vetting about his long-term relationship with Epstein. Starmer said he regretted the appointment and announced that, with the King's agreement, Mandelson had been removed from the Privy Council for bringing it into disrepute. The Mandelson scandal was significant for his premiership, and led to the resignation of Starmer's Chief of Staff Morgan McSweeney on 8 February 2026 as well as his Director of Communications Tim Allan the following day. Hours after Allan announced his resignation, Scottish Labour leader Anas Sarwar called on Starmer to quit as Prime Minister, but cabinet ministers responded by voicing their support for Starmer.

In April 2026, it was reported that Mandelson had failed security vetting for the role of ambassador. The Foreign Office, which Starmer accused of deliberately withholding information from him, overruled the recommendation of the vetting agency and allowed Mandelson to take up the post. Starmer faced calls to resign over allegations he misled Parliament when he said "full due process" was followed during the appointment.

=== Public opinion ===
Starmer was viewed unfavourably by the British public during his tenure as prime minister. Starmer's average approval rating fell from +5% after the election to −30% by January 2025 before levelling off until April 2025 when it began to decline further, reaching −46% by November that year. A poll by Ipsos indicates that Starmer is the most unpopular prime minister since Ipsos's records began in 1977. It found 13% of the public were satisfied with Starmer's job performance, 79% dissatisfied, giving a net approval rating of minus 66. Starmer's average net approval remained higher than Boris Johnson's during the Partygate scandal, Jeremy Corbyn's when he resigned as Labour leader and when Liz Truss resigned as prime minister.

Starmer's unpopularity was tied to poor results for Labour in the 2025 United Kingdom local elections, 2026 United Kingdom local elections and 2026 Senedd election. An opinion-piece in Politico viewed this as a likely catalyst for a leadership challenge.

In September 2025, The Guardian reported that plans to replace Starmer had begun among groups of MPs. The reports were instigated by briefings to the media from Starmer's allies, which stated that he would resist any attempted challenge to his leadership. By November, further reports emerged that plans to replace Starmer with Wes Streeting could be enacted after the November 2025 United Kingdom budget. Shortly thereafter, Clive Lewis became the first Labour MP to publicly call for Starmer's resignation.

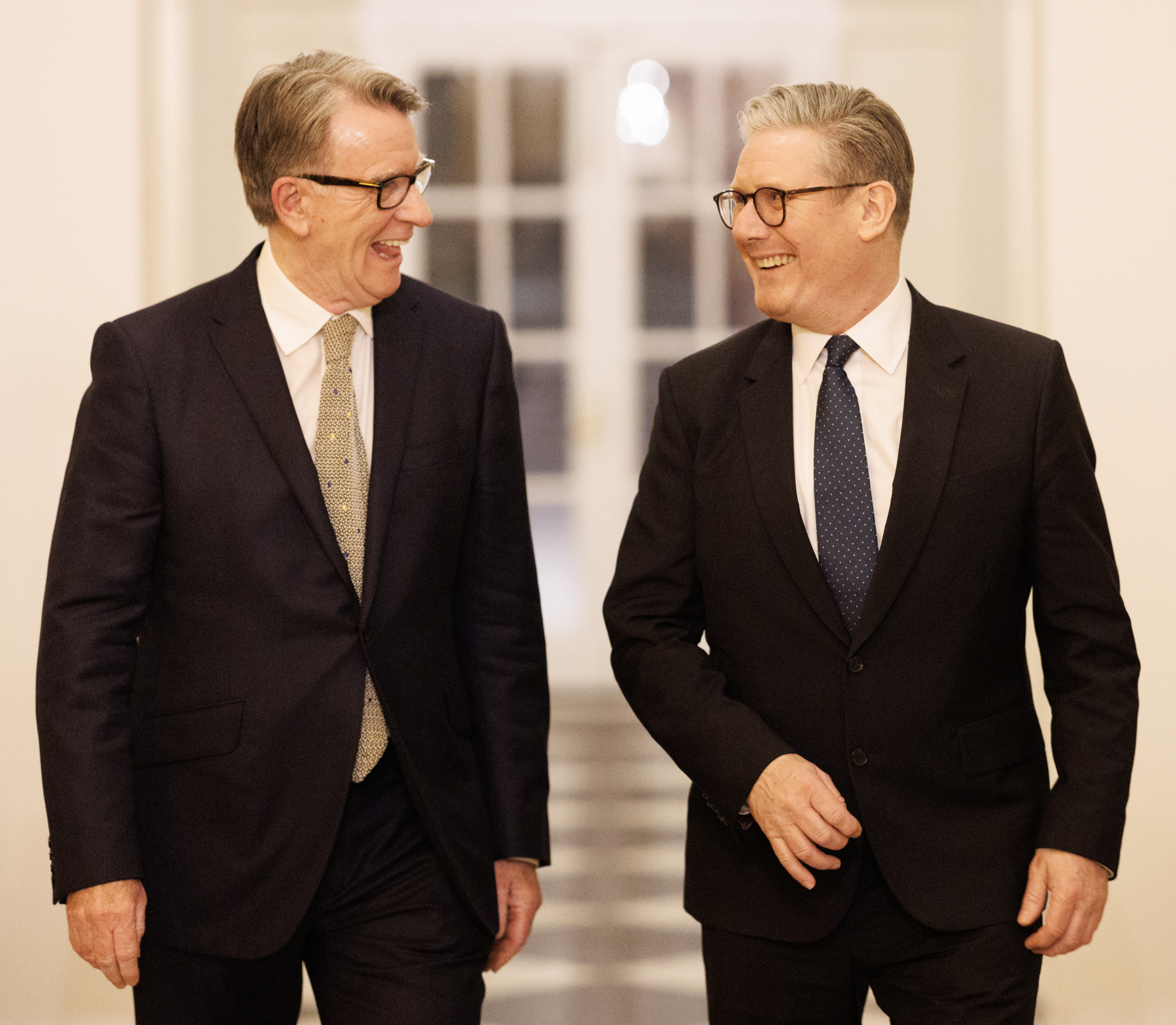
Peter Mandelson and Starmer in February 2025

A YouGov poll for The Times in February 2026 indicates that 51% of respondents thought Starmer was either more sleazy or as sleazy as Boris Johnson. The poll found that 43% of participants did not think Starmer had handled the Peter Mandelson scandal well; 23% thought that he had; 14% thought Starmer had shown good judgement in his handling of the affair.

=== Domestic policy ===
Domestically, Starmer said that his primary concerns would be economic growth, reforming the planning system, infrastructure, energy, healthcare, education, childcare, and strengthening workers' rights, as set out in Labour's 2024 election manifesto. The 2024 State Opening of Parliament outlined 39 bills that Labour proposed to introduce in the months ahead, including ones to renationalise the railways, to bring local bus services under local public control, to strengthen the rights of workers, to tackle illegal immigration, to reform the House of Lords, and to undertake a programme to speed up the delivery of "high quality infrastructure" and housing. In addition, a number of bills proposed by the previous Conservative government were also included, notably the Tobacco and Vapes Bill, which featured in the 2023 King's Speech, but had been abandoned when the election was called. Skills England, a body whose objective will be to reduce the need for overseas employees by improving skills training for people in England, was launched on 22 July.

==== Economy ====
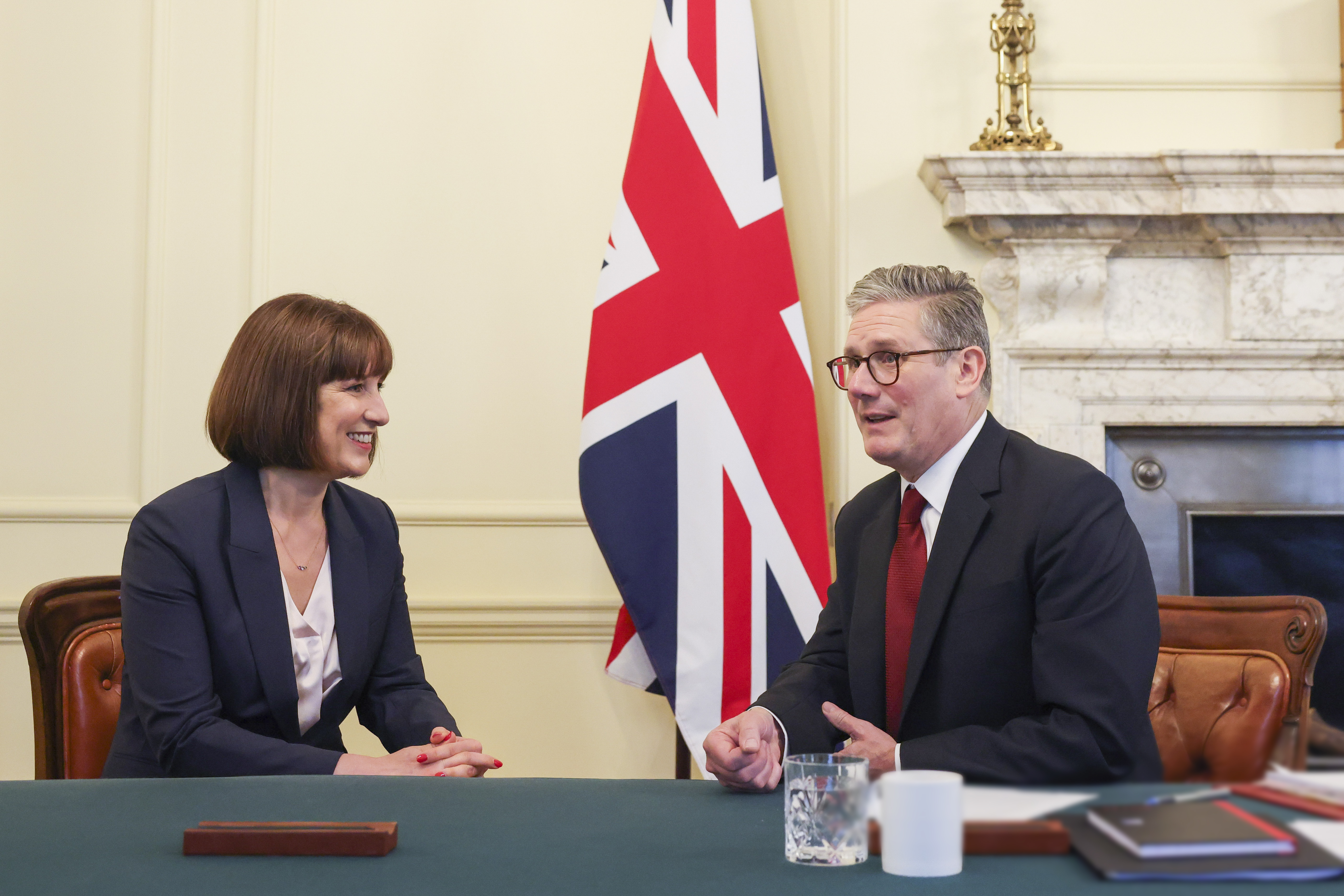
Starmer with Reeves, 6 July 2024

The new chancellor of the exchequer, Rachel Reeves, accused the previous government of leaving a £21.9 billion "black hole", and announced on 29 July 2024 that certain winter fuel payments would be scrapped for around 10 million pensioners. Following criticism of the plan, Starmer defended the scrapping of these winter fuel payments, arguing that he had to make "tough decisions to stabilise the economy". On 10 September 2024, the government benches defeated a Conservative Party motion in Parliament by a majority of 120 to block the measure. On 9 June 2025, the government, in what was described as a 'major U-turn', announced that it would reverse most of the cuts, restoring winter fuel payments to 9 million pensioners, citing improved public finances.

Starmer's Labour Government inherited a number of ongoing industrial disputes from the preceding Conservative Government and agreed on pay deals with trade unions representing NHS and railway workers, ending strikes in the first few months of taking office. In August 2024, Starmer's government agreed to increase public-sector worker pay by 5 to 7 per cent.

On 10 October 2024 the Government introduced the Employment Rights Bill, which became an Act of Parliament in December 2025. This includes an increase in minimum wages and a number of rights, such as immediate protection against unfair dismissal and the entitlement for employees to request flexible working arrangements unless the employer can demonstrate that such arrangements are impractical. The government's inaugural International Investment Summit was held on 14 October 2024 at the Guildhall in London.

The October 2024 budget was presented to the House of Commons by Chancellor of the Exchequer Rachel Reeves on 30 October 2024. It covered Labour's fiscal plans, with a focus on investment, healthcare, education, childcare, sustainable energy, transport, and worker's rights enrichment. The National Minimum Wage is set to increase by 6.7 per cent (reaching £12.21 per hour) and a £22.6 billion increase in the day-to-day health budget was announced, with a £3.1 billion increase in the capital budget. That includes £1 billion for hospital repairs and rebuilding projects. The government plans to allocate £5 billion for housing investment in the fiscal year 2025–26, with a focus on enhancing the availability of affordable housing. Education will receive £6.7 billion of capital investment, a 19 per cent real-terms increase. This includes £1.4 billion to rebuild more than 500 schools.

The June 2025 Spending Review was presented to the House of Commons by the Chancellor, allocating day-to-day budgets for the years between 2025/26 and 2028/29 and capital budgets for the years between 2025/26 and 2029/30. It included £14.2 billion for a new nuclear power station at Sizewell C, £15 billion for transport projects outside London, and £39 billion over a decade for social and affordable housing.

==== Immigration ====
One of Starmer's first acts was the cancellation of the controversial Rwanda asylum plan, describing it as "dead and buried". Cooper established the Border Security Command to tackle smuggling gangs which facilitate illegal migrant crossings over the English Channel.

Following the publication in November 2024 of the record net migration figure updated from the previously estimated 728,000 to 906,000 for the year to June 2023, and of the 20% drop to 728,000 for the year to the end of June 2024 as a result of rule changes by the then Conservative government, Starmer said he would introduce policies aimed at reducing immigration levels.

In a May 2025 speech and associated white paper on the topic of immigration, Starmer said that the UK risked becoming an "island of strangers", and that high immigration had done "incalculable damage" to society. The white paper outlined changes aimed at reducing immigration, including training for people in the UK. His language was criticised by the left for its perceived echoes of Enoch Powell's Rivers of Blood speech. In June, Starmer apologised for his "island of strangers" comment, saying that the phrase "wasn't right" and "I deeply regret using it". He said that he and his speechwriters had been unaware of the similarity with Powell's words.

On 10 July 2025, Starmer announced that a new "one in, one out" migrant deal with France would begin within weeks. In early September 2025, it was reported that 3,567 people had arrived on the UK's shores since the deal with France was ratified in August, however returns had not yet commenced. On 15 September 2025, the first "one in, one out" migrant flight, which was due to fly one migrant from London to Paris on an Air France flight, was cancelled due to protests from charities and threats of legal action. On 16 September 2025, deportation flights were cancelled again due to legal challenges and protests. Further that day it was reported that a 25-year-old Eritrean asylum seeker who had arrived on a small boat on 12 August 2025, would not be deported as planned on 17 September, after he won his High Court bid to have the removal temporarily blocked. As part of his immigration reform, on 18 November 2025, the 2025 UK refugee plan was presented to Parliament by Shabana Mahmood.

In November 2025, Starmer described the decrease in net migration to 204,000 as a "step in the right direction". Entries for the year ending June 2025 were 898,000, departures were 693,000.

==== Healthcare ====
On 11 September 2024 Starmer pledged that there would be no more money for the NHS without reform. In response to the report from a nine-week review conducted by the peer and NHS surgeon Lord Darzi, which said that the NHS in England was in a critical condition, Starmer said the solution was reform, not money, and that there will be no more money without reform.

In Government, Starmer reaffirmed the outgoing Conservative government's commitment of no new HIV cases in the United Kingdom by 2030. On 10 February 2025 Starmer, alongside the singer and HIV activist Beverley Knight and the Terrence Higgins Trust chief executive Richard Angell, recorded himself taking a rapid HIV home test. This made Starmer the first serving British prime minister and serving G7 leader to take a test on camera. In March 2025 Starmer, along with Health Secretary Wes Streeting announced a two-year plan to abolish NHS England, saying it would to reduce bureaucracy and increase funding available for more effective purposes within the service.

==== Welfare and pensions ====
Starmer initially declined to abolish the two-child benefit cap introduced by the Cameron–Clegg coalition government in 2013, citing financial reasons. On 23 July 2024 Labour withdrew the whip from seven of its MPs who had supported an amendment tabled by the Scottish National Party's Westminster parliamentary leader Stephen Flynn to scrap it, with Flynn saying that scrapping the cap would immediately raise 300,000 children out of poverty. MPs rejected the SNP amendment by 363 votes to 103. The seven Labour MPs suspended for six months were John McDonnell, Richard Burgon, Ian Byrne, Apsana Begum, Imran Hussain, Zarah Sultana, and Rebecca Long-Bailey, all of whom sat as independents; all MPs, (with the exception of Sultana, who resigned from the party in July 2025 to co-found Your Party with former Labour Leader Jeremy Corbyn), were later readmitted to the Parliamentary Labour Party. A Child Poverty Taskforce was launched by Starmer, in which expert officials from across government would work together on how best to support more than four million children living in poverty. Starmer eventually u-turned in November 2025, abolishing the two-child benefit cap in that month's fiscal budget.

In July 2025 the government's Universal Credit Bill passed the House of Commons. It will increase the standard rate of Universal Credit. The measures reduce the health-related aspect of universal credit for certain claimants, but they make sure that other parts of the benefit increase beyond inflation.

==== Education ====
Starmer's government has imposed VAT on private school fees, expanded free school meals to 500,000 more children, and opened 750 free breakfast clubs in primary schools. It also presided over an increase in tuition fees for higher education in England along with an increase in maintenance loans.

==== Criminal justice ====
Shortly after taking office, Starmer said that there were "too many prisoners", and described the previous government as having acted "almost beyond recklessness". Saying it would help manage prison overcrowding, the newly appointed Justice Secretary, Shabana Mahmood, announced the implementation of an early release scheme which allowed for prisoners in England and Wales to be released after serving 40 per cent of their sentences rather than the 50 per cent previously introduced under the last government. Over 1,700 prisoners were released in September, with further releases expected in the following year. It then emerged that one prisoner released early under the scheme was charged with sexual assault relating to an alleged offence against a woman on the same day he was freed. Starmer has defended the releasing of prisoners, and accused the previous government of having "broke[n] the prison system", with plans to build new prisons.

Critics have accused Starmer's government of two-tier policing, which has led to these critics labelling him with the moniker "Two-Tier Keir". Allegations of two-tier policing were prevalent during the Southport riots in August 2024 and the subsequent arrest of rioters and some of their supporters, such as Lucy Connolly, along with the Epping protests in July 2025. Conversely, critics such as Jamie Driscoll believe that the police are more favourable to right-wing protests and more heavy-handed against left-wing protests and groups such as Palestine Action, which was proscribed by Starmer's government in 2025.

==== 2024 England and Northern Ireland riots ====
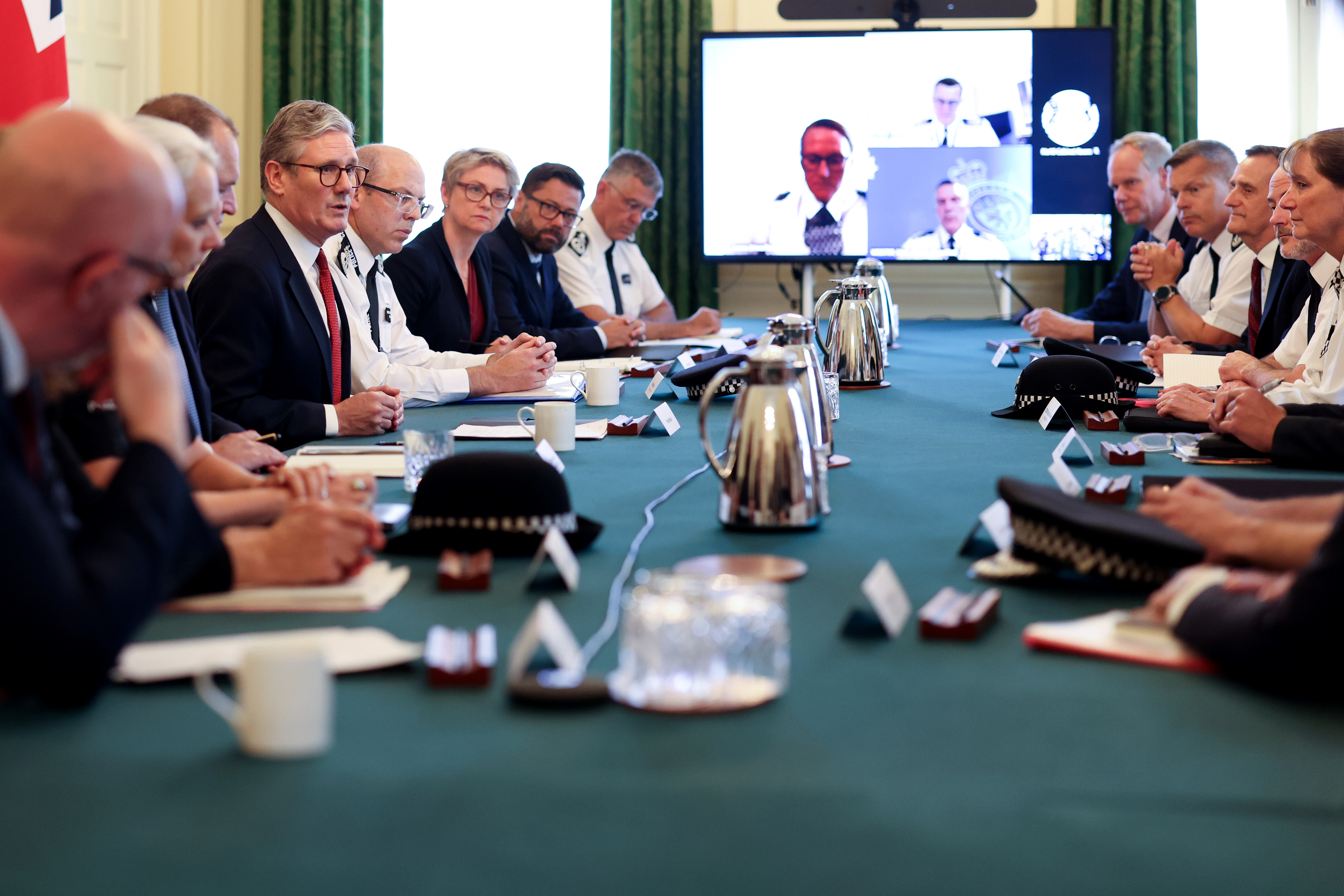
Starmer receives senior British police officers at 10 Downing Street, 1 August 2024.

Following the 2024 Southport stabbing, in which three young girls were killed, Starmer described the incident as horrendous and shocking and thanked emergency services for their swift response. He visited Southport and laid flowers at the scene, where he was heckled by some members of the public. Starmer later wrote amidst the riots across England and Northern Ireland following the stabbing that those who had "hijacked the vigil for the victims" had "insulted the community as it grieves" and that rioters would feel the full force of the law.

On 1 August, and following a meeting with senior police officers, Starmer announced the establishment of a National Violent Disorder Programme to facilitate greater cooperation between police forces when dealing with violent disorder. On 4 August Starmer stated that rioters "will feel the full force of the law" and that "You will regret taking part in this, whether directly or those whipping up this action online and then running away themselves". He added "I won't shy away from calling it what it is – far-right thuggery". Starmer later called an emergency response meeting of COBRA. After the COBRA meeting, Starmer ordered a "standing army" to be set up to tackle the ongoing "far-right" riots. This was possible under the special emergency powers which were first used 40 years ago under the Ridley Plan, to tackle striking miners in 1984 and 1985.

Following the 2024 UK riots, the Starmer government announced that it is reviewing the Online Safety Act 2023 with the possibility of strengthening its provisions.

Starmer rejected calls from some MPs – including the Labour MP Diane Abbott, the Reform UK leader Nigel Farage and the Conservative MP Dame Priti Patel – to recall Parliament to Westminster. After he said "large social media companies and those who run them" were contributing to the disorder, Elon Musk, the owner of the social media website X, criticised Starmer for not condemning all participants and only blaming the far-right. Musk further said Starmer was not protecting all communities in the United Kingdom, which he said had a "two-tier" policing system.

==== Acceptance of gifts ====
In September 2024, Starmer and fellow senior government ministers faced criticism for accepting gifts from Labour donors. Starmer also faced accusations of breaking parliamentary rules by not declaring £5,000 worth of clothes bought for his wife by the Labour donor Lord Alli. That same month, Sky News reported that Starmer had received £107,145 in gifts, benefits, and hospitality since December 2019, which was two-and-a-half times more than any other MP.

=== Defence ===
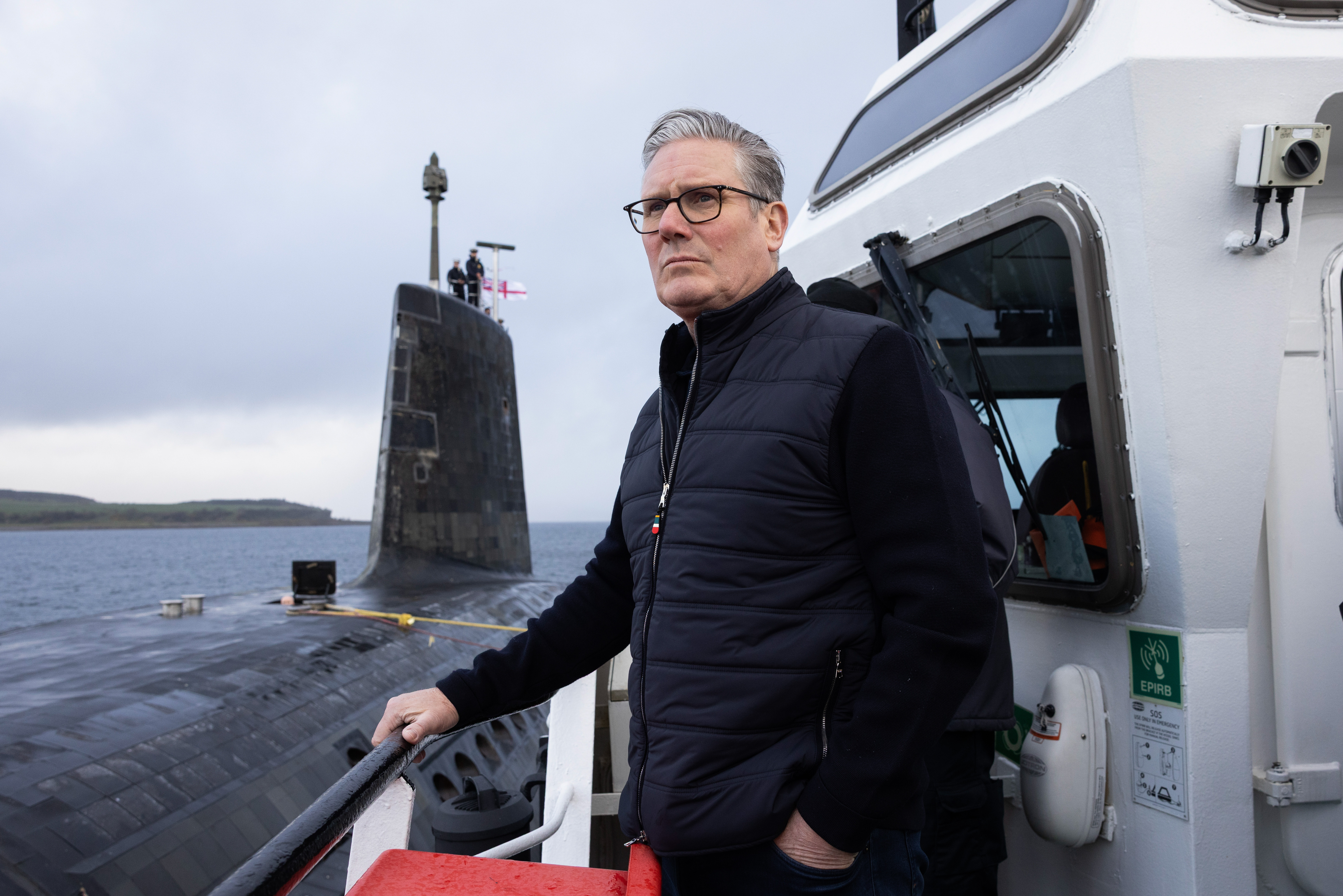
Starmer visiting a Vanguard-class submarine which provide Britain's nuclear deterrent

On 25 February 2025, Starmer announced that the previous government's commitment to reaching 2.5% of GDP spending on defence by 2030 would be brought forward to April 2027. This would be funded by reducing the official development assistance budget from 0.5% to 0.3%. George Robertson, a former Secretary General of NATO and Labour politician, led the 2025 Strategic Defence Review to guide the future increased spending, with Starmer commenting that the UK was moving to "war-fighting readiness" and that "everything we do will add to the strength of NATO".

In June 2025, Starmer announced the purchase of F-35A aircraft capable of deploying US nuclear weapons as part of NATO's dual capable aircraft nuclear mission, which his office said would be "the biggest strengthening of the UK's nuclear posture in a generation".

The Defence Investment Plan to implement the review was expected to be issued in autumn 2025. However this was delayed amid warnings that there was a £28 billion funding gap for shortfalls on previous commitments. The Public Accounts Committee reported that the delay was undermining the UK's credibility with NATO allies and confidence within the defence industrial base. On 11 June 2026, just before the planned Defence Investment Plan publication, Defence Secretary John Healey and his junior minister Al Carns resigned citing disagreement with the very limited spending increase given in the plan.

The Defence Investment Plan was announced by Starmer on 30 June 2026, after he had announced his resignation as prime minister and Leader of the Labour Party. The plan increased spending by about £1.5 billion over the previous draft, though funding for all the spending was not initially allocated.

=== Foreign policy ===
Politico reported that Starmer divided his time half and half between foreign and domestic matters, and in his first 17 months as prime minister visited 44 countries on 37 trips from the UK. Starmer said it would not be possible for a Prime Minister to spend less time on foreign matters in current circumstances.

==== United States ====
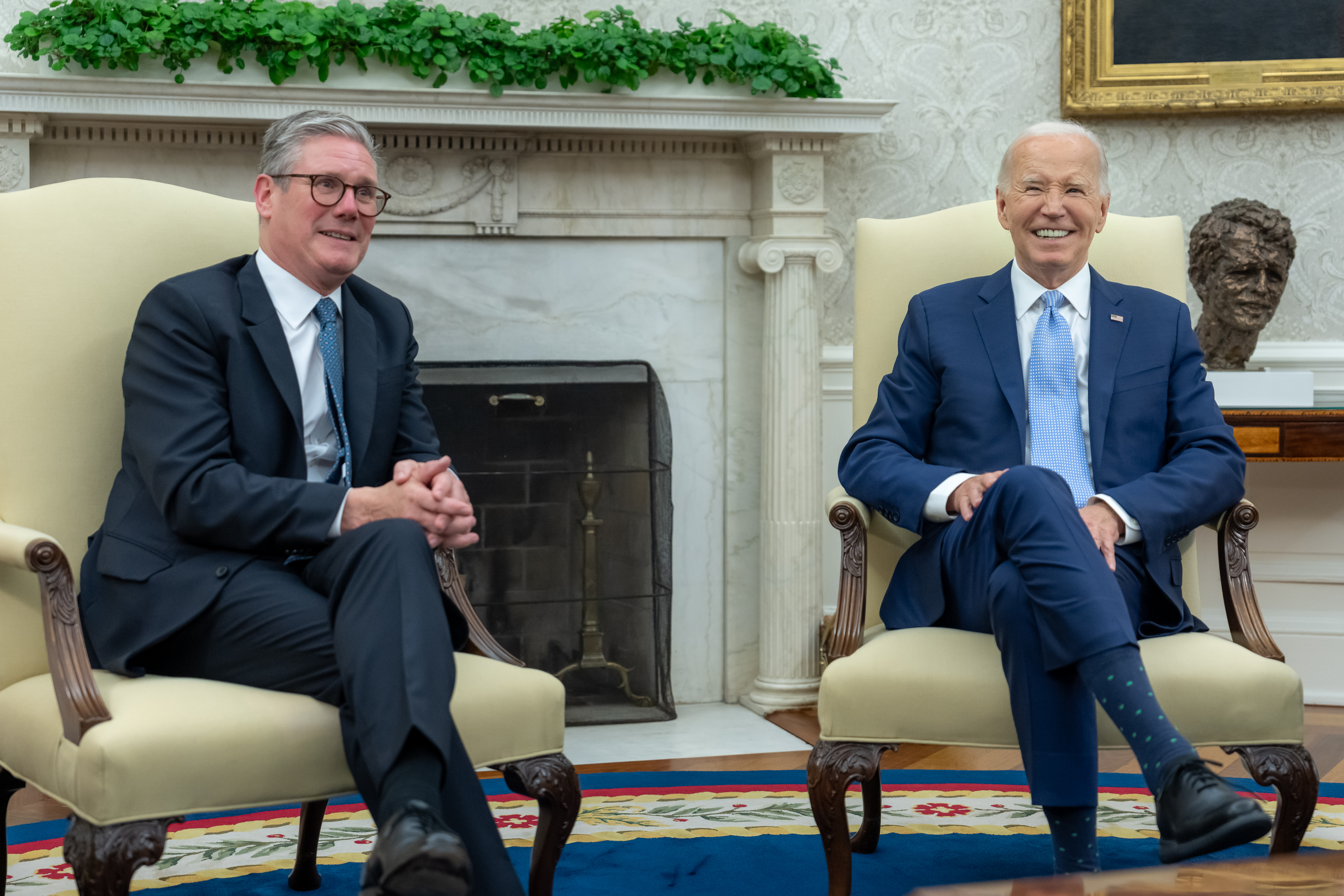
Starmer with US president Joe Biden in the Oval Office, 10 July 2024

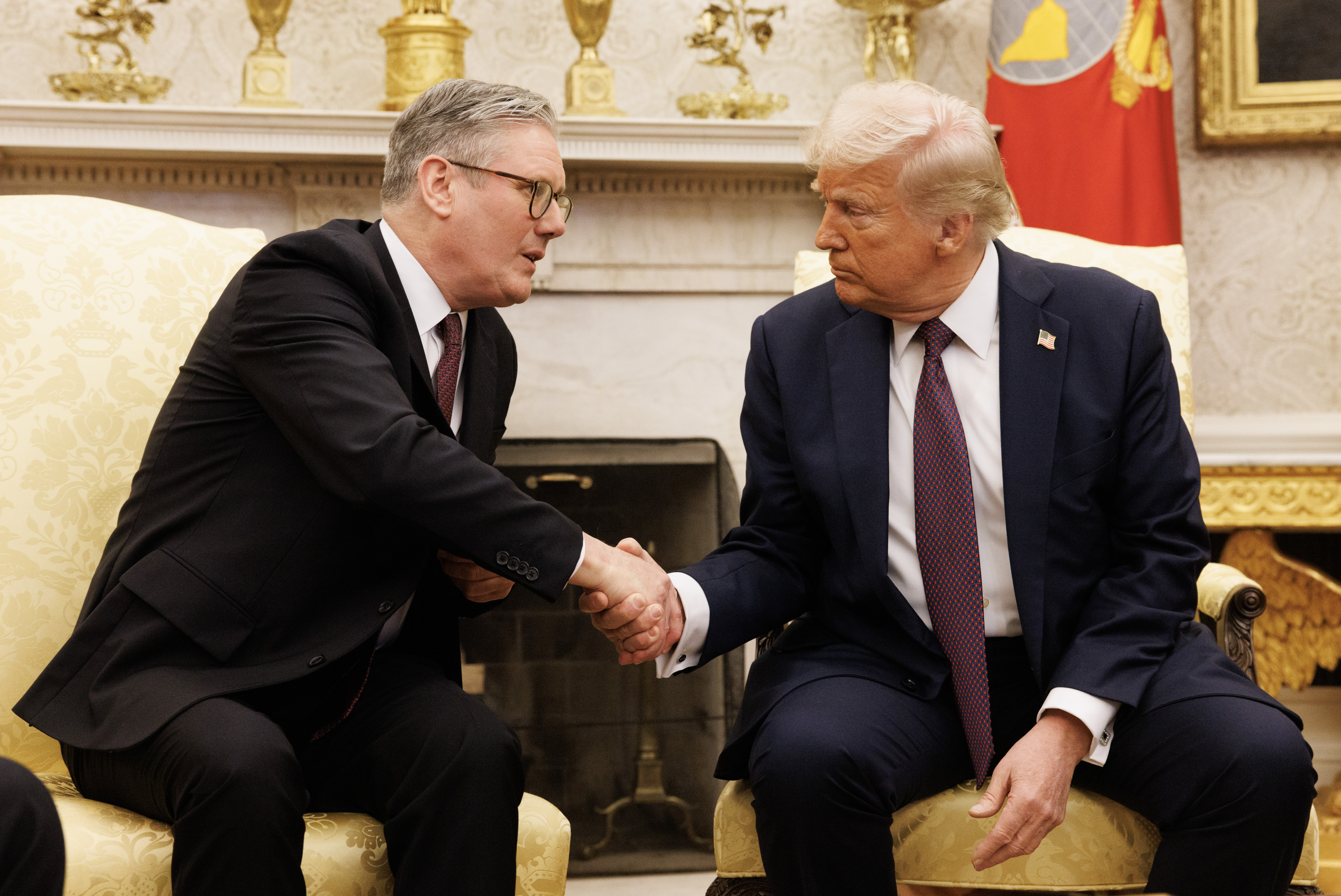
Starmer with US president Donald Trump in the Oval Office, 27 February 2025

In July 2024, following the 2024 general election, US president Joe Biden congratulated Starmer on "a hell of a victory". Starmer and Biden discussed their shared commitment to the Special Relationship between the US and the UK, as well as their mutual support of Ukraine.

Following the attempted assassination of Donald Trump in July 2024, the former president of the United States at the time, Starmer posted on Twitter saying "Political violence in any form has no place in our societies" and extended his best wishes to Trump and his family.

In September 2024, during a visit to New York City to address the UN General Assembly, Starmer met the American Republican Party presidential candidate, Trump, at Trump Tower. Following the meeting, Starmer said it was "good" to have met with Trump and that the meeting was an opportunity for both Trump and Starmer to establish a working relationship. Following Trump's election victory in the 2024 United States presidential election, Starmer called Trump to formally congratulate him on 6 November and was assured that the "special relationship" between the United Kingdom and United States "would continue to thrive".

In February 2025, Starmer met with President Trump at the White House to discuss continued support to Ukraine and a potential peace deal. They additionally discussed a potential trade deal. He also presented a handwritten letter from King Charles III inviting the President to a historic second state visit to the UK.

In June 2025 Starmer supported Israel in the Twelve-Day War and United States strikes on Iranian nuclear sites, stating that "Iran can never be allowed to develop a nuclear weapon and the US has taken action to alleviate that threat".

==== NATO ====
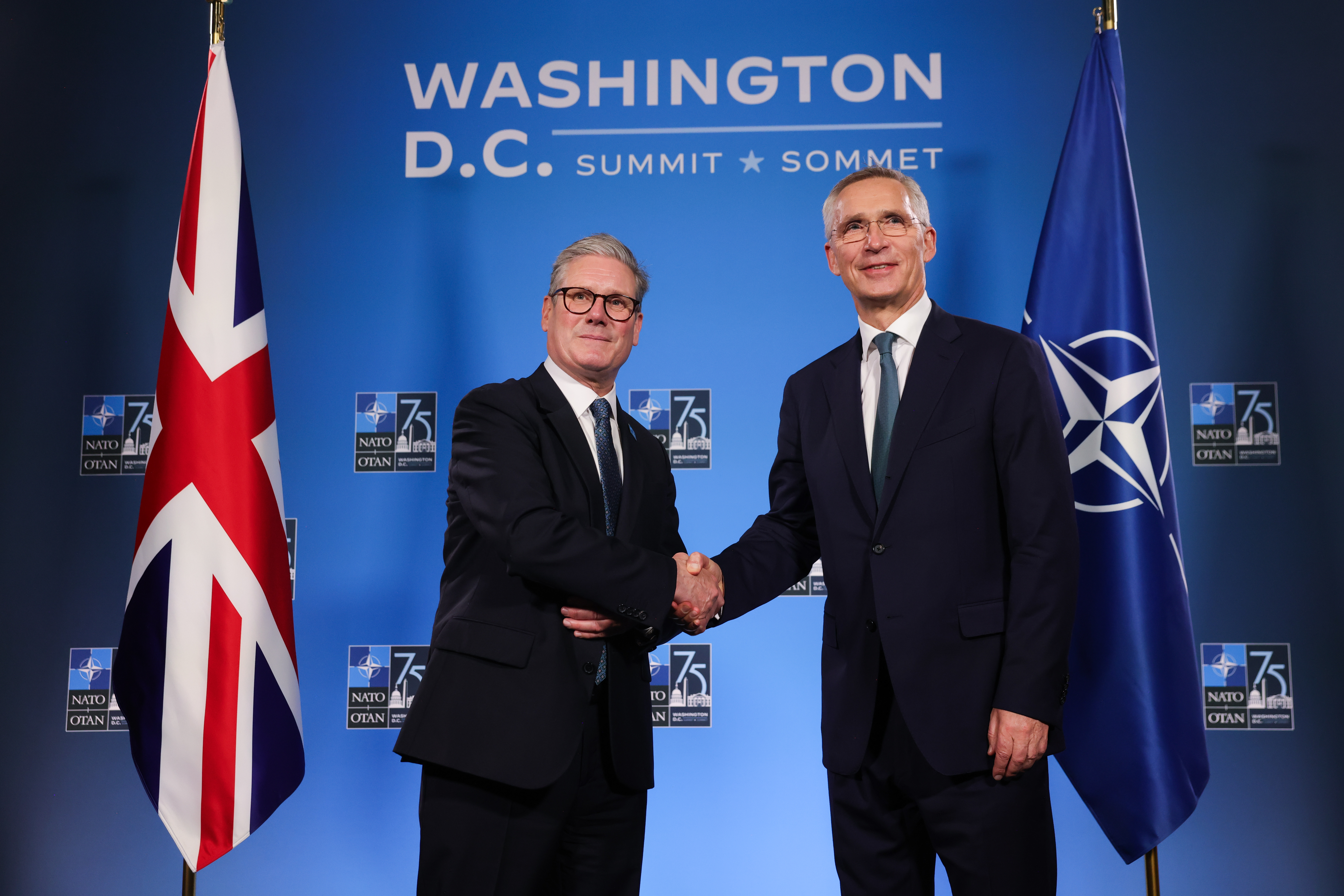
Starmer and Secretary-General Jens Stoltenberg at the NATO summit in 2024

The first overseas meeting Starmer attended as prime minister was the 2024 NATO summit held in Washington from 9 to 11 July 2024. On the flight to the summit, Starmer laid out a "cast iron" commitment to increase defence spending to the NATO target of 2.5 per cent of GDP in line with the NATO target, following a "root and branch" review of British armed forces.

==== Europe ====
Since he became prime minister, Starmer has sought to "reset" UK relations with the European Union following Brexit, which he opposed. He met with a number of European leaders during his first few months in office.

On 27 August 2024, Starmer and German Chancellor Olaf Scholz announced talks to revise a Germany-UK co-operation agreement covering areas including defence, energy security, and science and technology.

==== Russo-Ukrainian war ====
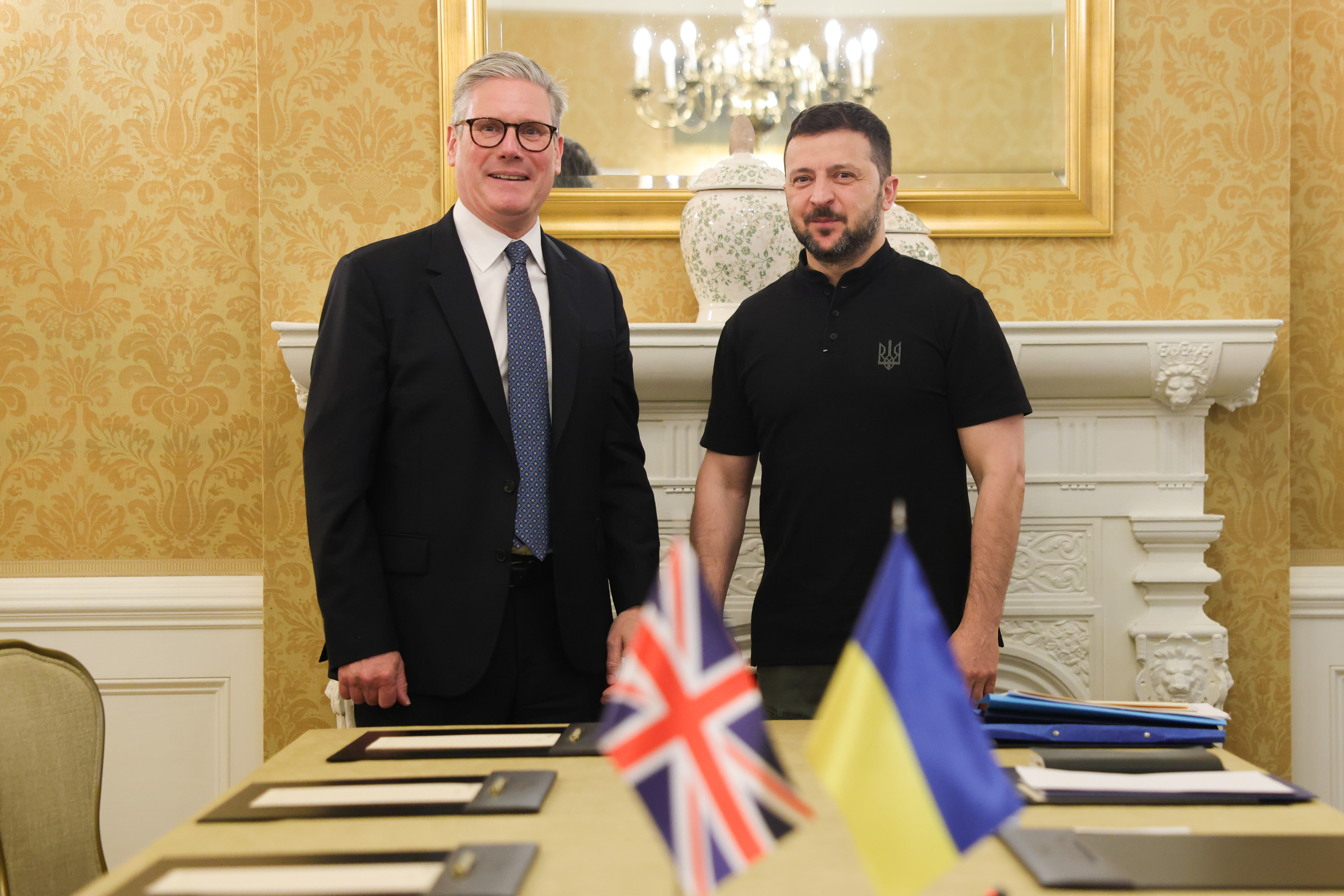
Starmer with Ukrainian president Volodymyr Zelenskyy, 10 July 2024

At the 2024 NATO summit, Starmer signalled that Ukraine could use British Storm Shadow missiles, sent by HMG by way of military aid, to strike military targets inside Russia, during the Russian invasion of Ukraine. In a meeting with Ukrainian president Volodymyr Zelenskyy Starmer called for an "irreversible" membership strategy for Ukraine to join NATO.

Following a heated meeting between US President Trump and President Zelenskyy at the White House, Starmer organised a summit of European leaders in London. Among the things discussed at the summit were continued support for Ukraine, security guarantees for the country and peace efforts.

==== China ====
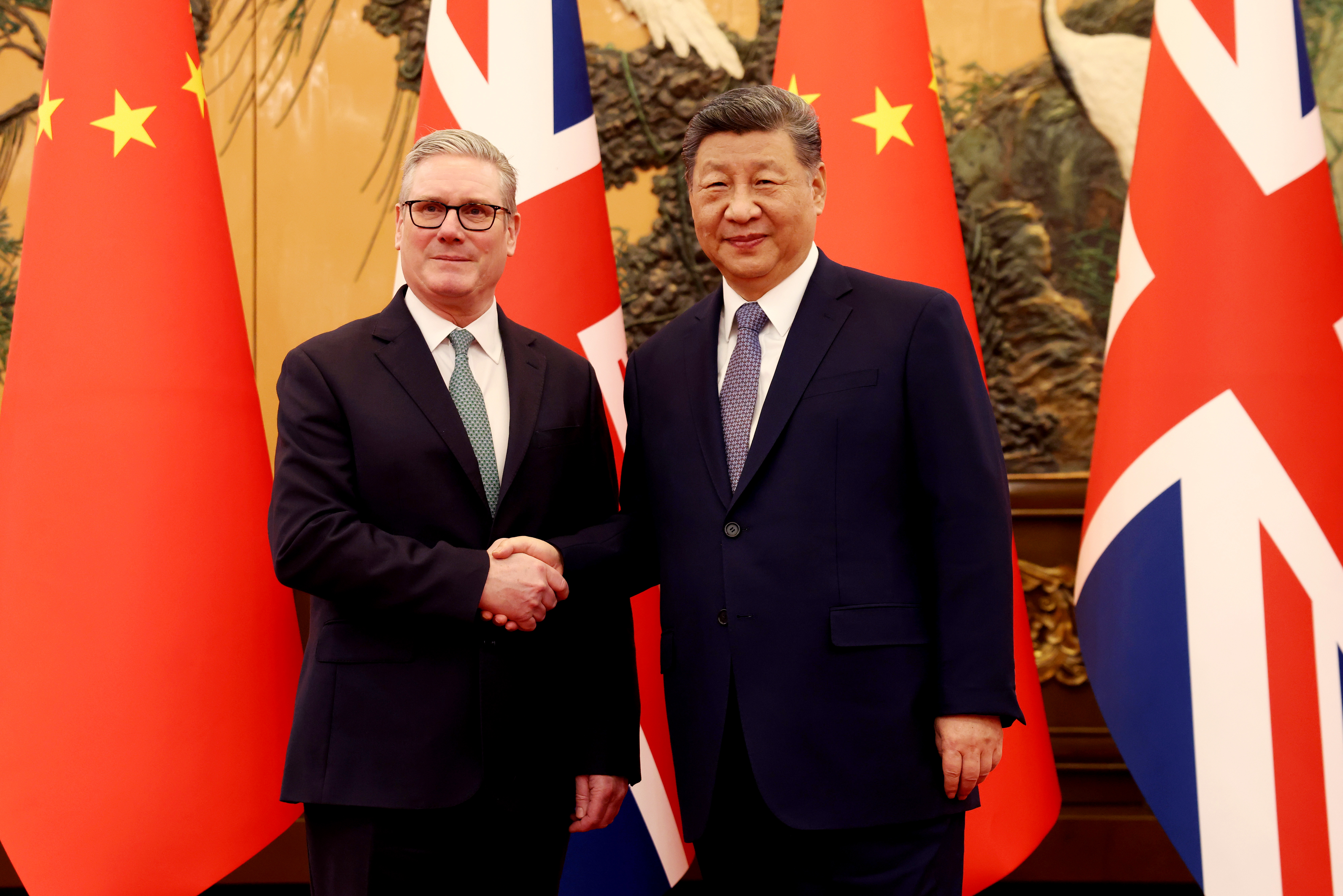
Starmer with Chinese president Xi Jinping, 30 January 2026

In November 2024, Starmer met Chinese president Xi Jinping at the G20 summit in Rio de Janeiro and told him he wanted to build a 'consistent, durable, respectful' relationship with China. In January 2026, Starmer approved Chinese government plans for a new embassy in London. In the same month, he visited China, becoming the first British prime minister to visit China since 2018. Starmer's trip primarily focused on broadening trade ties, bringing a delegation heavy on British banking executives, including HSBC, Barclays, and Standard Chartered, and cultural emissaries representing the arts and sports, as well as manufacturers, including Airbus, AstraZeneca, Brompton Bikes, Jaguar Land Rover, and McLaren Automotive.

A "China spy case" that came to light in 2024 involving Christopher Cash, a former parliamentary researcher, and Christopher Berry collapsed in September 2025 after the Crown Prosecution Service (CPS) dropped charges under the Official Secrets Act. The two were accused of passing information harmful to UK interests between December 2021 and February 2023. Director of Public Prosecutions Stephen Parkinson said the case fell apart because the government failed to provide evidence that China was officially considered a national security threat at the time, as required under a 2025 legal precedent. Conservative leader Kemi Badenoch accused Starmer's government of withholding key evidence to appease China, while the government denied interference and blamed outdated laws and the previous administration's stance on China.

==== Gaza war ====
On the Gaza war, Starmer has supported Israel's right to self-defence and has not blocked all arms sales to Israel. He has also condemned some of Israel's actions, called for a ceasefire, committed humanitarian aid to Gaza, and supported a two-state solution.

In October 2023, shortly after the Hamas attack on Israel, when asked what a proportionate response by Israel would be, Starmer stated that Israel had the "right to defend herself" and "Israel has the right to do everything it can" to return the hostages. When subsequently asked whether a siege involving the cutting off of food and water was appropriate, he responded, "I think Israel does have that right" adding that "everything should be done within international law but I don't want to step away from the sort of core principles that Israel has a right to defend herself and Hamas bears responsibility for these terrorist acts". This sparked significant controversy within his party, and several Labour councillors resigned in protest. Starmer then said that he was referring to the right to self-defence, "I was not saying that Israel had the right to cut off water, food, fuel or medicines".

When he became prime minister, Starmer told Israeli Prime Minister Benjamin Netanyahu of the "urgent need for a ceasefire, the return of hostages and an immediate increase in the volume of humanitarian aid". He also assured Netanyahu that the UK would continue its "vital cooperation to deter malign threats" with Israel.

Under Starmer's premiership, the licences of some British arms sales to Israel were suspended in September 2024 because of a "clear risk" that the weapons could be used to violate international law. Foreign Secretary David Lammy announced the UK Government's suspension of 30 of 350 arms export licences to Israel, affecting equipment such as parts for fighter jets, helicopters and drones. However, in the last three months of 2024, UK arms licenses to Israel totalled £127.6 million, exceeding the £115 million worth of military equipment sent to Israel in the prior four years, 2020 to 2023.

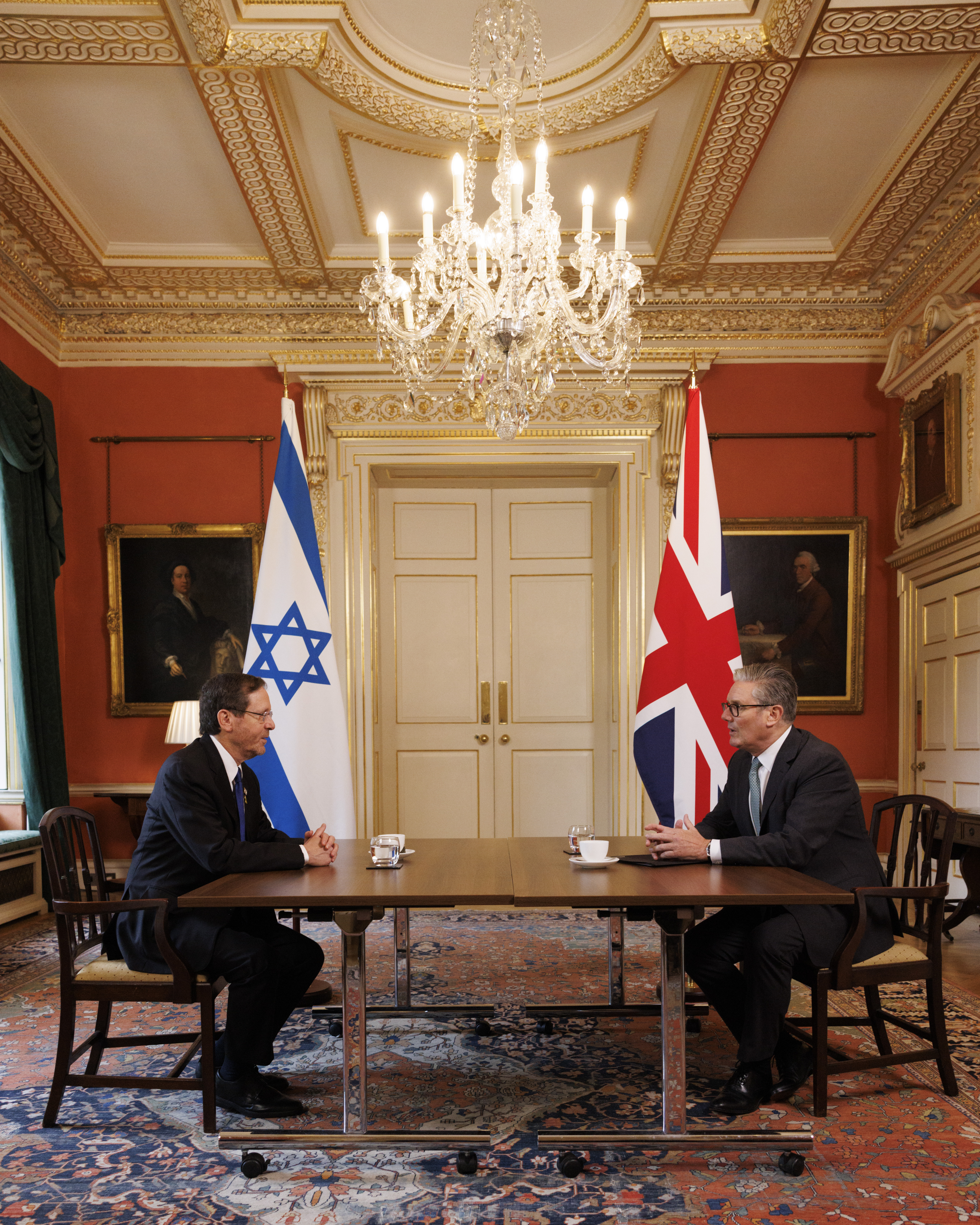
Keir Starmer with Israeli president Isaac Herzog at 10 Downing Street, 10 September 2025

Starmer's government stated in November 2024 that Netanyahu would be arrested if he were to travel to the UK, after the International Criminal Court issued an international arrest warrant for him over alleged war crimes.

In May 2025, Starmer issued a joint statement with Emmanuel Macron and Mark Carney condemning Israel's renewed offensive against Gaza. He called for Israel to immediately stop its military operations and to immediately allow humanitarian aid into Gaza. The statement condemned remarks by members of the Israeli government suggesting the destruction in Gaza would lead to relocation of its population as "abhorrent" and against international law. He said his government would take "concrete actions" if Israel continued its "egregious actions". Netanyahu accused Starmer of siding with Hamas, saying "you're on the wrong side of justice, you're on the wrong side of humanity and you're on the wrong side of history".

On 5 July, the government made the protest group Palestine Action a "proscribed organisation" under the Terrorism Act 2000, following its vandalism of military aircraft at RAF Brize Norton, alleged to support the Israeli military. On 6 August, at a Labour National Executive Committee meeting, Starmer said the group had targeted Jewish-owned businesses, and that the ban was not meant "to stifle debate on Palestine". On 9 August, the Metropolitan Police made 532 arrests, its most in at least a decade, at a protest in Parliament Square. Of these, 522 were for "displaying an item in support of a proscribed organisation", as most protestors carried placards reading "I oppose genocide. I support Palestine Action." Amnesty International and Liberty condemned the proscription as infringing on freedom of speech. Protests against the banning of Palestine Action continued into September 2025, with 890 arrests in one weekend.

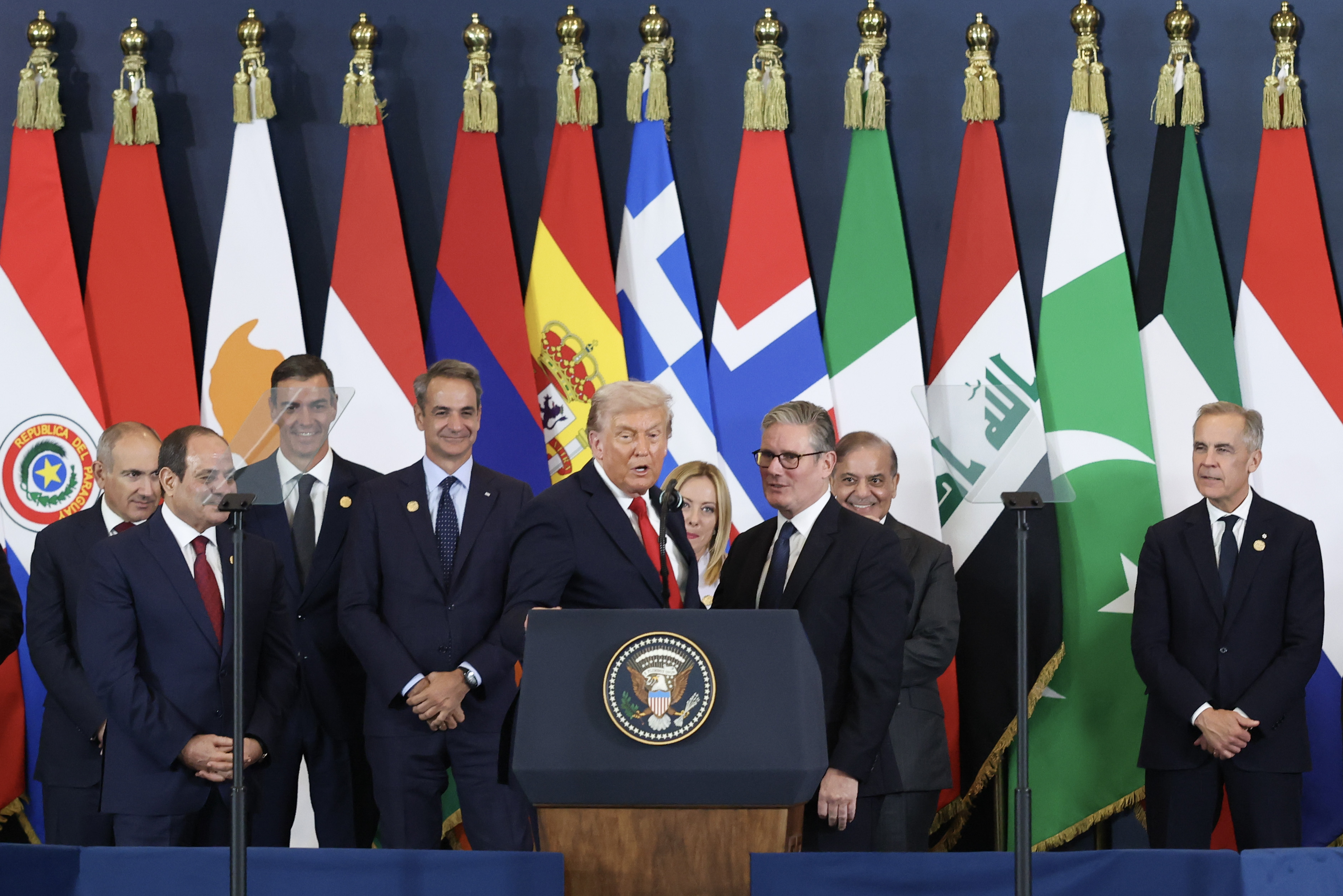
Starmer at the Gaza peace summit in Egypt, 13 October 2025

On 29 July 2025, Starmer announced that the United Kingdom would conditionally recognise the State of Palestine at the September opening of the United Nations General Assembly, contingent on Israel's noncompliance with a ceasefire, the facilitation of humanitarian aid, and a commitment to a two-state solution. The announcement followed a letter signed by 225 MPs, including over half of Labour, calling for immediate recognition. One of its coordinators, Sarah Champion, criticised the conditionality, while Netanyahu and Conservative politicians condemned the move as rewarding Hamas. On 21 September, Starmer announced that the United Kingdom formally recognised Palestine as an independent state.

==== Sudan ====
In late 2025, Starmer's government faced mounting pressure to suspend arms sales to the United Arab Emirates following reports that British-made military equipment was being diverted to the Rapid Support Forces (RSF) in Sudan, which had been accused of committing war crimes and genocide during the ongoing Sudanese civil war.

=== 2026 leadership crisis and resignation ===
Approval ratings of Starmer as prime minister

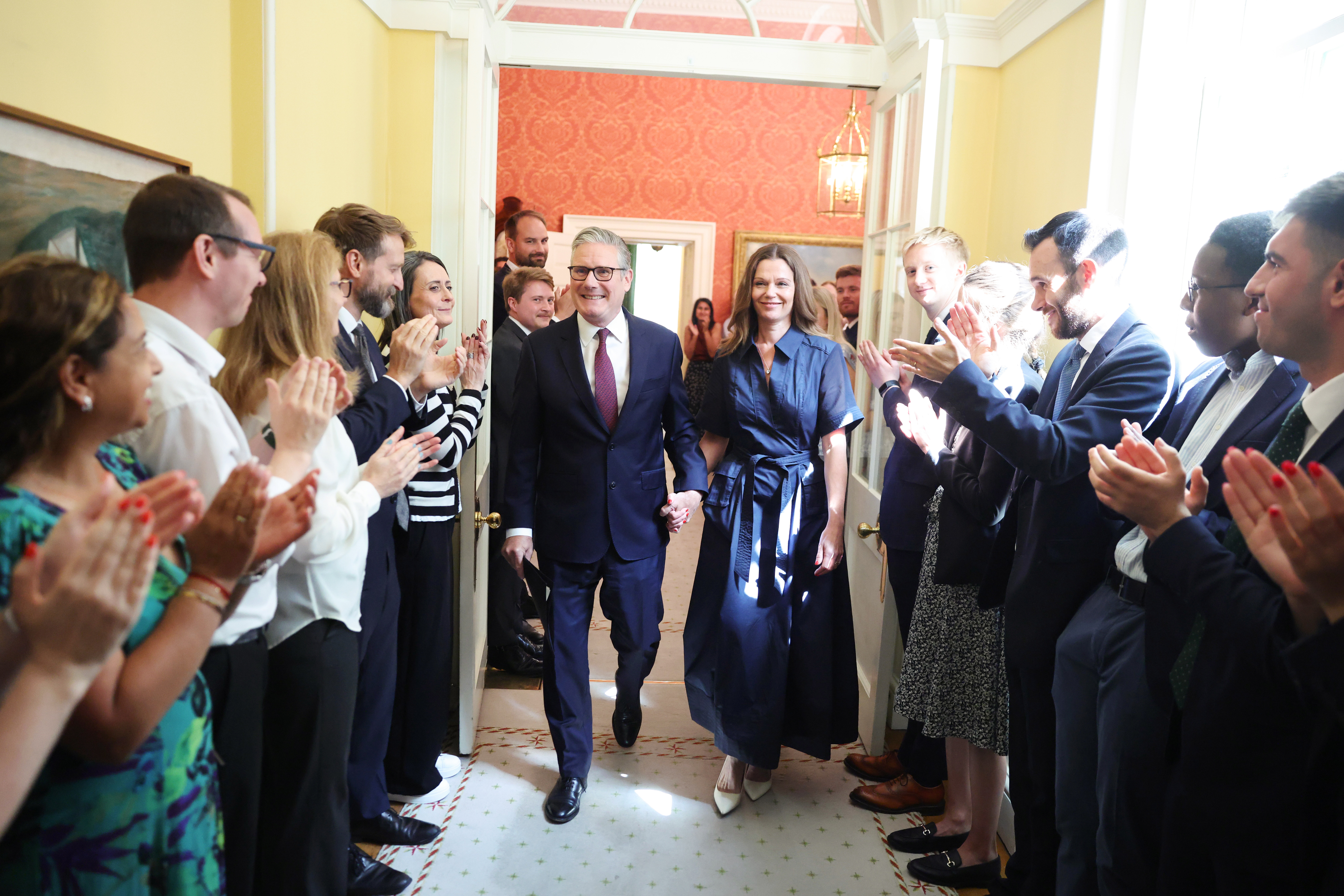
Starmer leaving Number 10 Downing Street on his last day as prime minister.

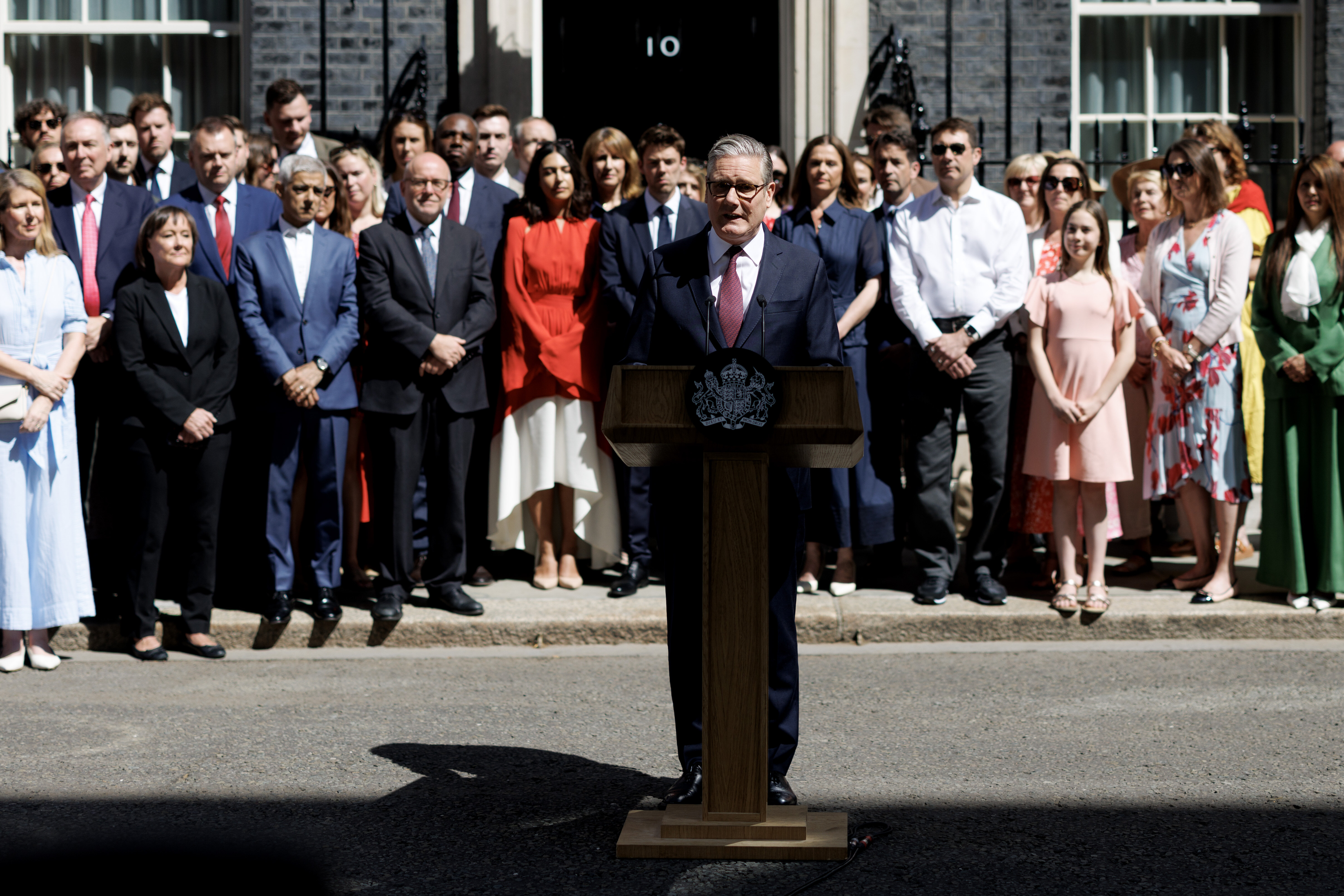
Starmer delivers his resignation speech at 10 Downing Street.

In May 2026, Starmer faced a political crisis following reports of internal divisions within the Labour government and speculation over his future leadership, following on from poor popularity ratings in opinion polls from soon after he became prime minister. The crisis intensified after the resignation of several senior ministers and growing criticism from factions within the Labour Party concerning economic policy, immigration, and electoral strategy. Media outlets reported discussions among Labour MPs regarding potential leadership alternatives, including senior cabinet figures and regional mayors. During a cabinet meeting, Starmer rejected calls to resign and challenged critics within the party to formally contest the leadership if they wished to replace him. Under Labour Party rules, a leadership challenge would require the support of 20 per cent of Labour MPs.

On 22 June 2026, Starmer announced his intention to resign as prime minister and Leader of the Labour Party and asked the party's National Executive Committee to set the timetable for choosing his successor, with nominations due to open on 9 July and the process to conclude before the summer recess. Starmer remained in his positions until the conclusion of the leadership election.

On 20 July 2026 Starmer formally tendered his resignation to Charles III at Buckingham Palace and was officially succeeded by Burnham hours later. Starmer's premiership was the shortest ever by a Labour prime minister and the sixth shortest overall since 1900.

== Post-premiership (2026–present) ==
=== Resignation as an MP ===
Upon leaving office as prime minister, Starmer's spokesperson said he intended to remain an MP after he had formally resigned his premiership, but was likely to move to the backbench rather than accept a post in Burnham's cabinet. However, hours before the parliament returned from summer recess on 1 September, Starmer announced that he was standing down as an MP to focus on a role in international affairs, and left the Commons later the same day upon his appointment to the Chiltern Hundreds, triggering the 2026 Holborn and St Pancras by-election. It was also announced Starmer would be giving out Resignation Honours despite previously saying he would not.

=== International affairs ===
On 30 October 2026, Starmer made his first major political speech since leaving office, speaking at a dinner hosted by the British Irish Chamber of Commerce at Dublin City Hall. He called for greater European cooperation on defence and security, arguing that the United Kingdom should play a central role in a common European security framework. He warned that the changing relationship between Europe and the United States represented a permanent shift rather than a temporary consequence of the Trump presidency, stating that "things will not go back to the way they were before".

== Political positions ==
Starmer's political positions changed significantly after the 2020 Labour Party leadership election, which he won on a ten-pledge, left-leaning platform. Most of the pledges, including increasing income tax on the top 5 per cent of earners, abolishing university tuition fees, and support for freedom of movement, were abandoned or substantially changed during Starmer's tenure as Labour and Opposition leader. Starmer defended changing positions on these issues, stating that shifting economic circumstances made these pledges unrealistic.

Some commentators, judging that Starmer has led his party towards the political centre in order to improve its electability, attempt to liken what he has accomplished in this regard with Tony Blair's development of New Labour. Others regard his changes of policy as testament that Starmer holds no clearly defined philosophy. A third group think that Starmer does subscribe to a definite ideology and that it is towards the left end of the socialist spectrum, arguing that "Labour under Starmer has advanced a politics of anti-neoliberalism like that of Jeremy Corbyn and John McDonnell", and that Starmer "differs markedly from New Labour" in "aspiring to restructure an economic model perceived to have failed".

Figures including Starmer's former boss – the barrister Geoffrey Robertson – his former advisor Simon Fletcher, and the journalist and broadcaster Peter Oborne, have described Starmer as exhibiting an authoritarian approach. In office, he initiated plans to garner support from authoritarian-leaning voters.

Despite the lack of consensus as yet about the character and even existence of Starmer's ideology, it has acquired a neologism, Starmerism, and his supporters have been called Starmerites. Starmer's advisor Morgan McSweeney is often credited with having significantly influenced Starmer's political positions.

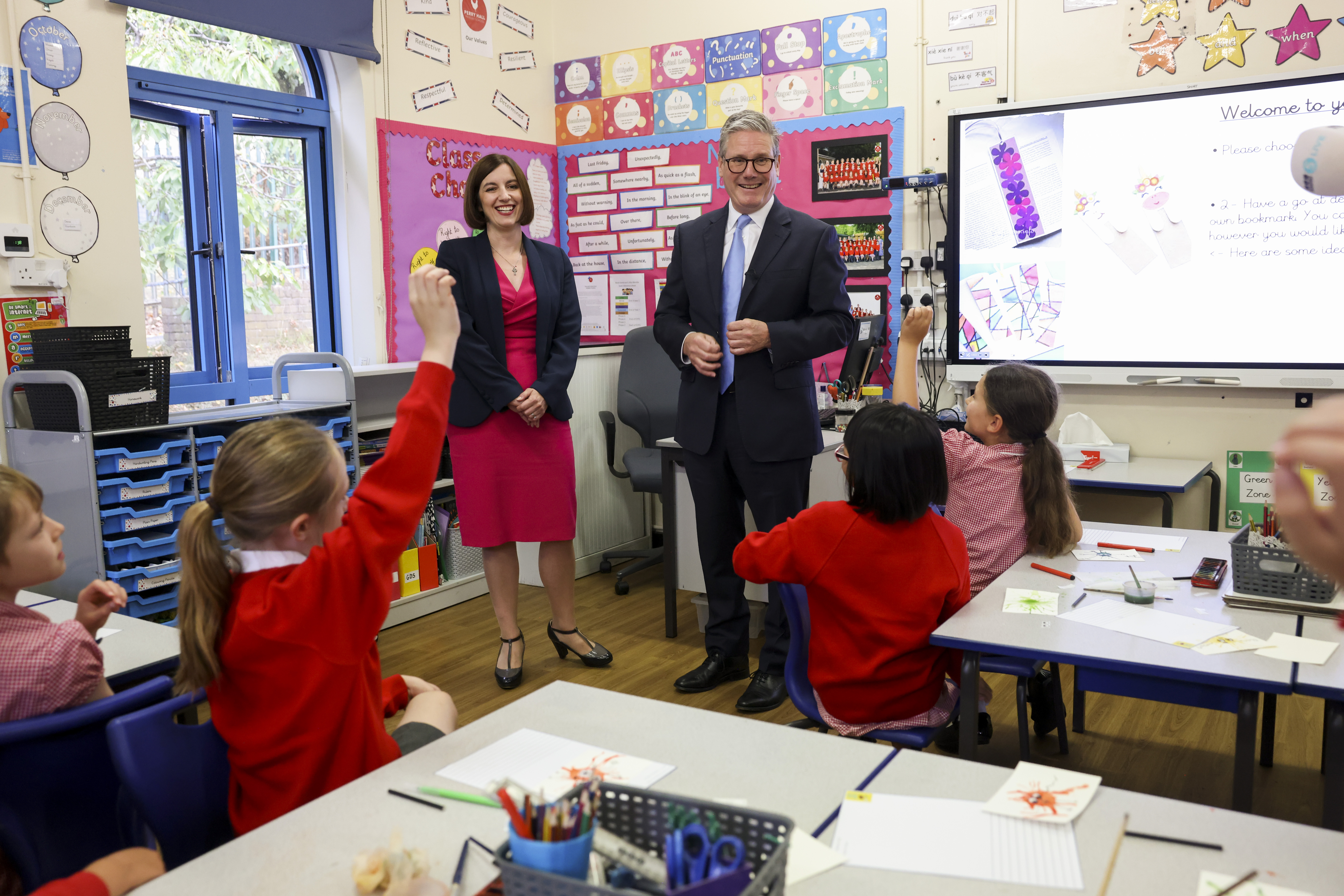
Starmer and Bridget Phillipson, Secretary of State for Education, visit primary school children in Orpington.

In April 2023 Starmer gave an interview to The Economist on defining Starmerism. In this interview, two main strands of Starmerism were identified. The first strand focused on a critique of the British state for being too ineffective and over-centralised. The answer to this critique was to base governance on five main missions to be followed over two terms of government: these missions would determine all government policy. The second strand was the adherence to an economic policy of "modern supply-side economics" based on expanding economic productivity by increasing participation in the labour market, reducing inequality, expanding skills, mitigating the impact of Brexit and simplifying the construction planning process.

In June 2023, Starmer gave an interview to Time where he was asked to define Starmerism, stating: "Recognising that our economy needs to be fixed. Recognising that [solving] climate change isn't just an obligation; it's the single biggest opportunity that we've got for our country going forward. Recognizing that public services need to be reformed, that every child and every place should have the best opportunities and that we need a safe environment, safe streets, et cetera."

Starmer is a member of the Fabian Society. He supports social ownership and investment in the UK's public services. He has remained committed to renationalising the railways and local bus services, the creation of a publicly owned energy company, and stricter regulation of water and energy companies. He advocates for reducing the voting age to 16, a change that is set to be implemented in the UK by the next general election.

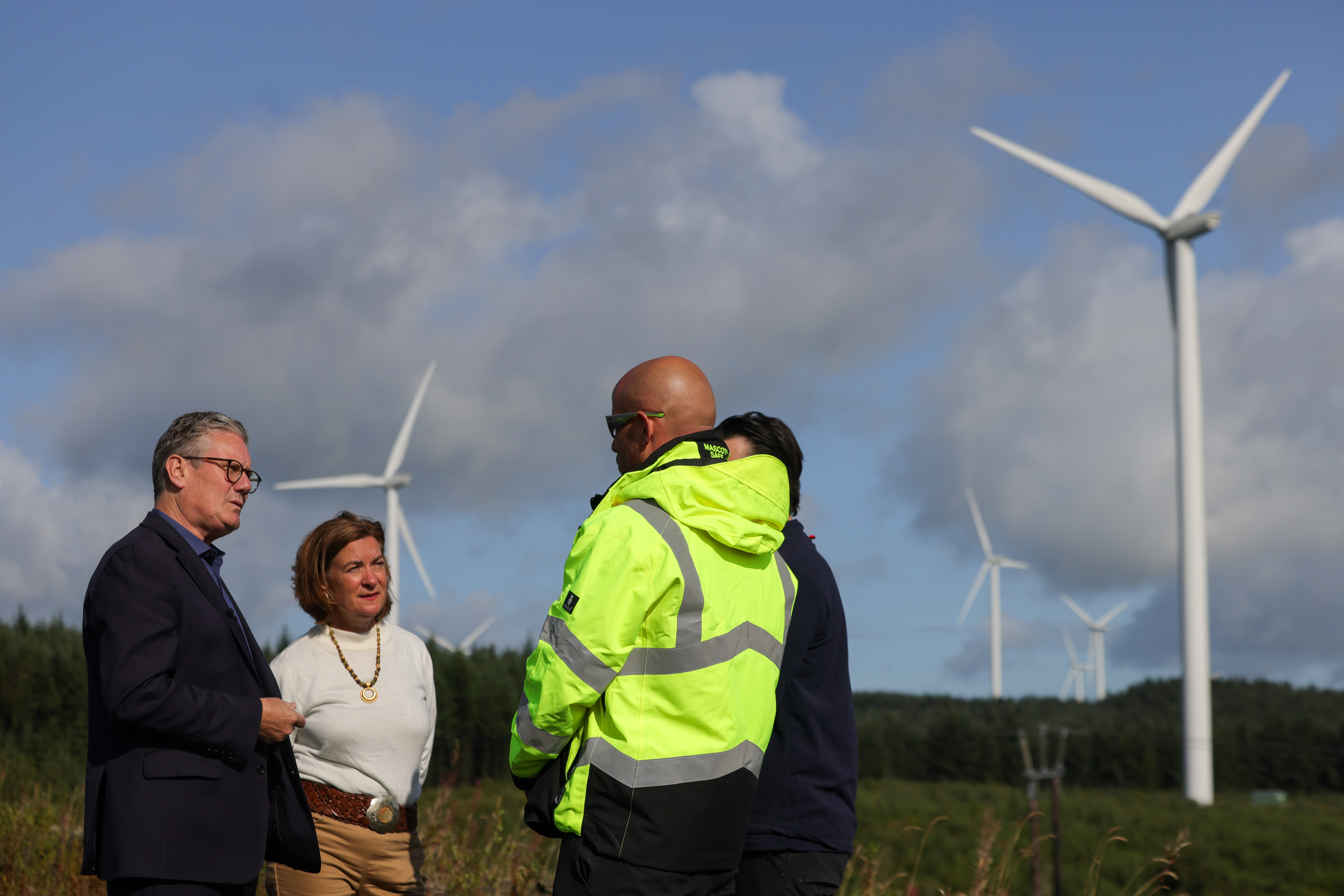
Starmer visits Trydan Gwyrdd Cymru Wind Farm with First Minister of Wales, Baroness Eluned Morgan in Carmarthenshire, to promote Great British Energy.

Starmer has repeatedly emphasised the reform of public institutions (against a tax and spend approach), localism, and devolution. He has pledged to abolish the House of Lords, which he describes as "indefensible", during the first term of a Labour government and to replace it with a directly elected Assembly of the Regions and Nations, the details of which will be subject to scrutiny by public consultation. He criticised the Conservatives for creating peerages for "cronies and donors". Starmer tasked the former Labour prime minister Gordon Brown with recommending British constitutional reforms, whose report was published in 2022. Endorsed and promoted by Starmer, Brown's report recommended the abolition of the House of Lords, extending greater powers to local councils and mayors, and deeper devolution to the countries of the United Kingdom. Labour's 2024 election manifesto committed to the removal of the remaining hereditary peers from the chamber, setting a mandatory retirement age of 80, and beginning a consultation on replacing the Lords with a "more representative" body. A 2025 pre-conference Guardian editorial stated Starmer generally took an Anglo-American not European position, and had referenced the American centrist Abundance book and buzzword for developing prosperity by deregulation, rapid infrastructure development and market-led growth.

Starmer strongly favours green policies to tackle climate change and decarbonise the British economy. He has committed to eliminate fossil fuels from the UK electricity grid by 2030.

Starmer has supported policies to improve animal welfare. In December 2025 and early 2026, Starmer's Defra announced a large suite of animal welfare changes, including bans on hen cages, pig farrowing crates, and low-welfare chicken breeds on farms.

In a July 2024 statement to PinkNews ahead of the 2024 election, Starmer stated the Labour Party supported LGBT rights, including strengthening protections against hate crimes targeting members of the LGBT community, "modernising" the "intrusive and outdated" gender recognition framework, and a proposed, "trans-inclusive" ban on conversion therapy. After taking office, the Labour Party reiterated plans for the ban as part of the King's speech.

The government continued to block the Gender Recognition Reform Bill in Scotland, while Starmer personally has ruled out allowing transgender people to self-identify, and has stated that trans women should not have the right to use women-only spaces. Following the Supreme Court decision of For Women Scotland Ltd v The Scottish Ministers on 16 April 2025, Starmer, through a spokesperson, stated that he no longer believed that transgender women could be considered women, in accordance with the Court's ruling that the definition of a woman in the Equality Act 2010 only constituted "biological women".

After the murder of George Floyd by the police officer Derek Chauvin in the United States, against which numerous protests were held in the Western world, Starmer supported the Black Lives Matter movement, and took the knee alongside his deputy, Angela Rayner. One year on from Floyd's murder, Starmer promised a Race Equality Act, which he said would be a "defining cause" for his Labour Government.

In the wake of the murder of Sarah Everard in March 2021, Starmer called for longer sentences for rape and sexual violence. Starmer said he wanted to reduce crime, maintaining that "too many people do not feel safe in their streets". He has pledged to halve the rates of violence against women and girls, halve the rates of serious violent crime, halve the incidents of knife crime, increase confidence in the criminal justice system, and create a 'Charging Commission' which would be "tasked with coming up with reforms to reverse the decline in the number of offences being solved". He has also committed to placing specialist domestic violence workers in the control rooms of every police force responding to 999 calls to support victims of abuse. In June 2024 Starmer pledged to reduce the record high level of legal immigration to the UK, and aims to reduce net migration by improving training and skills for British workers.

In December 2023, Starmer used Margaret Thatcher, as well as Tony Blair and Clement Attlee, as examples of how politicians can effect "meaningful change" by acting "in service of the British people, rather than dictating to them". Starmer has described the Labour Party as "deeply patriotic" and credits its most successful leaders, Attlee, Harold Wilson, and Blair, for policies "rooted in the everyday concerns of working people". In a speech in May 2023, Starmer stated:

Don't mistake me, the very best of progressive politics is found in our determination to push Britain forward. A hunger, an ambition, that we can seize the opportunities of tomorrow and make them work for working people. But this ambition must never become unmoored from working people's need for stability, for order, security. The Conservative Party can no longer claim to be conservative. It conserves nothing we value — not our rivers and seas, not our NHS or BBC, not our families, not our nation. We must understand that there are precious things – in our way of life, in our environment, in our communities – that it is our responsibility to protect, preserve, and pass on to future generations. If that sounds Conservative, then let me tell you: I don't care.

— Keir Starmer

In June 2026, Starmer announced that the government intended to introduce primary legislation by 25 December 2026 to restrict the use of selected social media platforms that enable "user to user" messaging and linked algorithms, with live streaming. The government restrictions are intended to be imposed by early 2027 for under-16s.

== Personal life ==
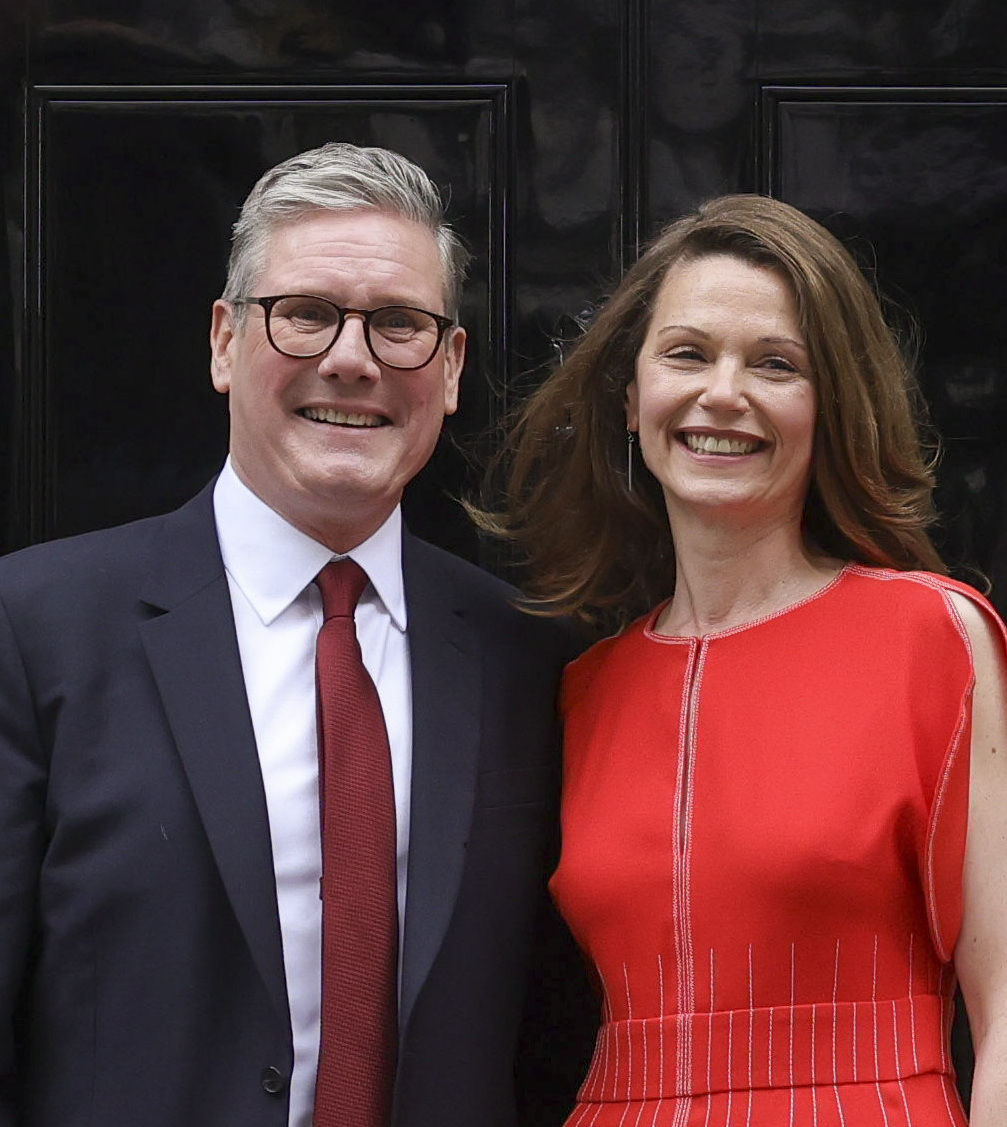
Starmer and his wife, Victoria, outside 10 Downing Street, 5 July 2024

Starmer met Victoria Alexander, then a solicitor, in the early 2000s. At the time he was a senior barrister with Doughty Street Chambers, and they were working on the same case. They became engaged in 2004 and married on 6 May 2007 at the Fennes Estate near Bocking, Essex. The couple have two children: a son, who was born a year after their wedding, and a daughter, born two years later. Prior to moving into Downing Street, the family lived in a townhouse in Kentish Town, north-west London. In 2026 two foreign nationals were convicted at the Old Bailey of conspiring to carry out arson on the property and on a vehicle connected to the Starmer family. The attack was allegedly orchestrated by a Russian-based network as part of a wider campaign of sabotage, vandalism and disinformation across Europe.

Starmer is a pescatarian, and his wife is a vegetarian. They raised their children as vegetarians until they were 10 years old, at which point they were given the option of eating meat. In an interview during the 2024 general election campaign, Starmer said that his biggest fear about becoming prime minister was how it might impact his children, due to their "difficult ages" and how it would be easier if they were younger or older. During the 2024 general election campaign, Starmer said in an interview that he would try to avoid working on Friday evenings in order to observe Shabbat dinners and spend time with his family.

Starmer is an atheist and chose to take a "solemn affirmation" (rather than an oath) of allegiance to the monarch in 2022. He has said that although he does not believe in God, he recognises the power of faith to bring people together and has been supportive of raising his children in Judaism. He regularly accompanies his family to services at the Liberal Jewish Synagogue in North London. Starmer is a keen footballer, having played for Homerton Academicals, a north London amateur team. He is a long-standing supporter of the Premier League football club Arsenal, holding a season-ticket at the Emirates Stadium. He takes his seat on match-days as a guest in the club's directors' box, which he says is due to security concerns as prime minister.

From September 2024 until July 2026, Starmer and his family kept a Siberian cat, named Prince, at 10 Downing Street.

On 26 December 2024, Starmer's brother Nick died following a cancer diagnosis. Starmer issued a statement the next day paying tribute to him.

== Awards and honours ==
Starmer took silk in 2002, when he was appointed Queen's Counsel (now King's Counsel). In 2005, he received the Bar Council's Sydney Elland Goldsmith Award for his contribution to pro bono legal work challenging the death penalty in Uganda, Kenya, Malawi and the Caribbean.

For services to law and criminal justice, Starmer was appointed a Knight Commander of the Order of the Bath (KCB) in the 2014 New Year Honours. The appointment entitled him to wear the Order's badge and star on appropriate occasions.

Starmer was elected an Honorary Fellow of St Edmund Hall, Oxford, in 2022. In 2025, Time included him in the Time 100, its annual list of the world's 100 most influential people.

On 13 July 2026, French president Emmanuel Macron appointed Starmer a Grand Officier of the Légion d'honneur, in recognition of his contribution to European security and his role in establishing the "coalition of the willing" in support of Ukraine. Three days later, Ukrainian president Volodymyr Zelenskyy awarded him the Order of Liberty, Ukraine's highest state decoration that may be conferred on a foreign national, in recognition of his support for Ukraine and its defence against the Russian invasion.

=== Orders and decorations ===
- (United Kingdom) Order of the Bath — Knight Commander (KCB), 31 December 2013
- (France) Légion d'honneur — Grand Officier, 13 July 2026
- (Ukraine) Order of Liberty — Member (MOB), 16 July 2026

=== Honorary degrees ===
Date	School	Degree
21 July 2011	University of Essex	Doctor of University (D.U.)
16 July 2012	University of Leeds	Doctor of Laws (LL.D.)
19 November 2013	University of East London	Doctor of Laws (LL.D.)
19 December 2013	London School of Economics	Doctor of Laws (LL.D.)
14 July 2014	University of Reading	Doctor of Laws (LL.D.)
18 November 2014	University of Worcester	Doctor of University (D.Univ.)

=== Privy Council ===
Starmer was sworn in as a member of the Privy Council on 19 July 2017, entitling him to use the honorific prefix "The Right Honourable".

== See also ==
- Electoral history of Keir Starmer
- List of nicknames of Keir Starmer
- List of prime ministers of the United Kingdom
- List of heads of the executive by approval rating

== Notes ==
Legal offices
Preceded by Ken Macdonald	Director of Public Prosecutions; 2008–2013	Succeeded by Alison Saunders
Parliament of the United Kingdom
Preceded by Frank Dobson	Member of Parliament for Holborn and St Pancras; 2015–2026	Succeeded by Sagal Abdi-Wali
Political offices
Preceded by Emily Thornberry	Shadow Secretary of State for Exiting the European Union; 2016–2020	Office abolished
Preceded by Jeremy Corbyn	Leader of the Opposition; 2020–2024	Succeeded by Rishi Sunak
Preceded by Rishi Sunak	Prime Minister of the United Kingdom; 2024–2026	Succeeded by Andy Burnham
Preceded by Rishi Sunak	Minister for the Civil Service; 2024–2026	Succeeded by Andy Burnham
Preceded by Rishi Sunak	First Lord of the Treasury; 2024–2026	Succeeded by Andy Burnham
Party political offices
Preceded by Jeremy Corbyn	Leader of the Labour Party; 2020–2026	Succeeded by Andy Burnham
Orders of precedence in the United Kingdom
Preceded by Ian Blackford	Gentlemen; Privy Counsellor (sworn July 2017)	Followed by Sir Donnell Deeny
