= Keir Starmer as Leader of the Labour Party =

Leader of the Labour Party (2020–2026)

- Official portrait, 2024
- Keir Starmer as Leader of the Labour Party; 4 April 2020 – 17 July 2026
- Deputy: Angela Rayner (2020-2025); Lucy Powell (2025-2026)
- Cabinet: Starmer shadow cabinet (2020–2024); Starmer ministry (2024–2026)
- Party: Labour
- Election: Leadership; 2020; General; 2024

Keir Starmer was elected as Leader of the Labour Party on 4 April 2020, following Jeremy Corbyn's resignation after Labour's defeat at the 2019 general election.

Following his election as Labour leader on 4 April 2020, Starmer became Leader of the Opposition, a position he held until Labour’s landslide victory in the 2024 general election, following which he became Prime Minister.

After Starmer became Prime Minister, he was succeeded as Leader of the Opposition by Rishi Sunak.

== Term as Leader of the Opposition (2020-2024) ==
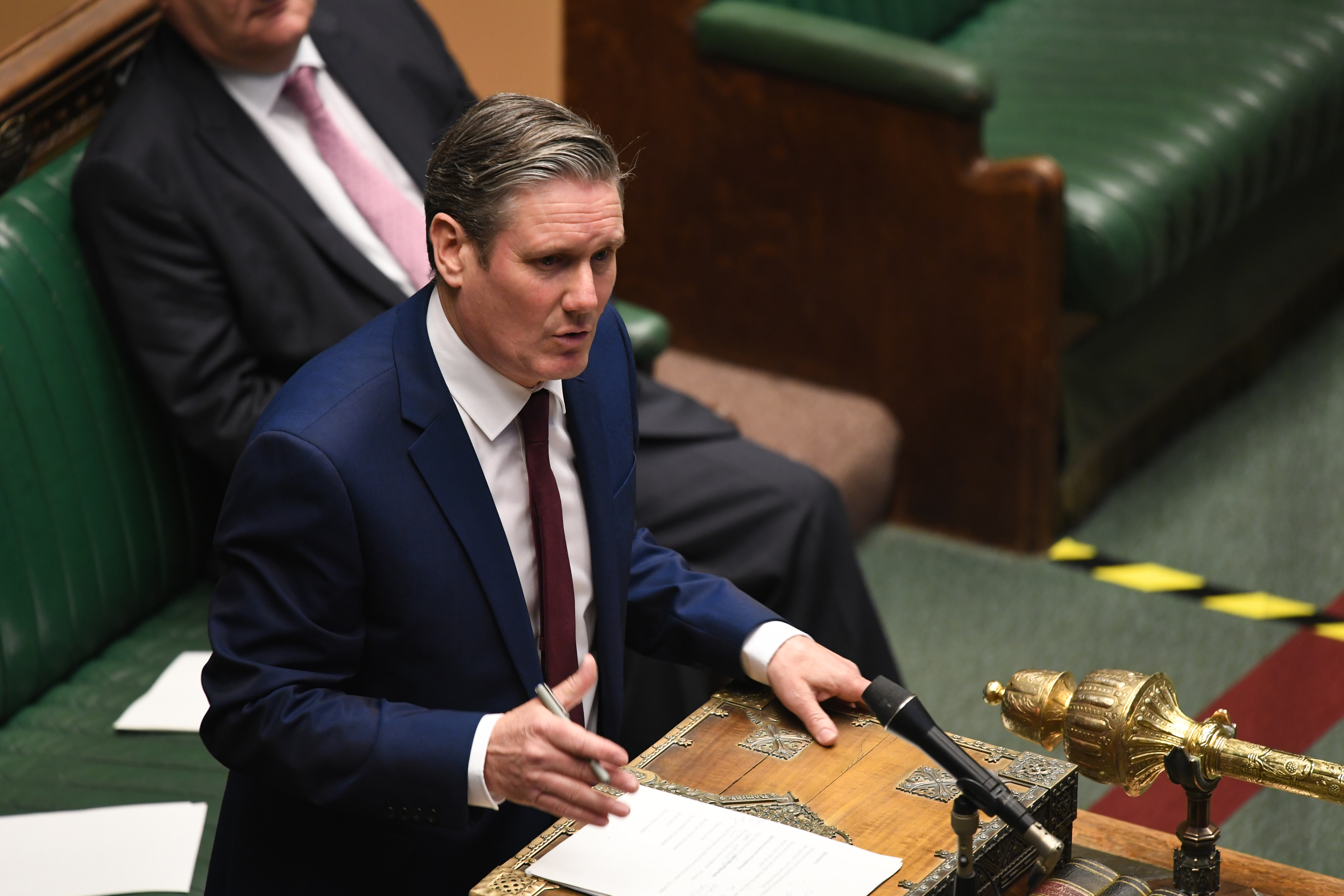
Starmer speaking in the Commons during Prime Minister's Questions, 22 April 2020

Having become Leader of the Opposition during the COVID-19 pandemic, Starmer said in his acceptance speech that he would refrain from "scoring party political points" and would work with the Government "in the national interest". He later became more critical of HM Government's response to the pandemic following the Partygate scandal. On 13 December 2021, during the COVID-19 pandemic in the United Kingdom, Starmer recorded a Christmas message at Waheed Alli, Baron Alli's house, urging the public to work from home, while giving the impression he was in his own home, with a family picture behind him. In May 2022, Starmer said he would resign were he to receive a fixed penalty notice for breaching COVID-19 regulations while campaigning during the run-up to the Hartlepool by-election and local elections the previous year. The controversy surrounding the event was dubbed "Beergate". In July 2022, Durham Police cleared Starmer and said that he had "no case to answer". In the following month, the Parliamentary Commissioner for Standards, Kathryn Stone, found that Starmer had breached the MPs' code of conduct on eight occasions by failing to register interests.

Amidst the historic number of ministers resigning from Boris Johnson's government in July 2022, Starmer proposed a vote of no confidence in the Government, stating that Johnson should not be allowed to remain in office. Starmer also criticised Johnson, as well as his successors Liz Truss and Rishi Sunak, for issues such as the Chris Pincher scandal and the subsequent government crisis, the economic crisis resulting from the 2022 mini-budget and subsequent government crisis, the cost of living crisis, and the industrial disputes and strikes including National Health Service strikes.

As Labour leader Starmer focused on repositioning the Party away from the Left and the controversies that affected Corbyn's leadership, with promises of economic stability, tackling small-boat crossings, cutting NHS waiting times and "rebuilding the NHS", worker rights enrichment, energy independence and infrastructure development, tackling crime, improving education and training, reforming public services, renationalising the railway network, and recruiting 6,500 teachers. Starmer also pledged to end antisemitism within the Labour Party. In October 2020, following the release of the Equality and Human Rights Commission (EHRC)'s report into antisemitism in the Labour Party, Starmer accepted its findings in full and apologised to Jews on the Party's behalf. In February 2023 the EHRC said that changes the party had made to its complaints and training procedures meant that the Labour Party no longer needed to be monitored by them.

In September 2023 he reshuffled his shadow cabinet. Starmer was ranked number two in the New Statesman's Left Power List 2023, below his Shadow Chancellor, Rachel Reeves, but still described as "the overwhelming favourite to be the next Prime Minister". The reshuffle was seen as a promotion of Blairites and demotion of those on the soft left.

During the 2023 Gaza War, Starmer emphasised his support for Israel, stated he would favour military aid to the country, and called the actions of Hamas and other militants terrorism. In an interview with LBC on 11 October 2023, Starmer was asked whether it would be appropriate for Israel to totally cut off power and water supplies to Gaza, with Starmer replying that "I think that Israel does have that right" and that "obviously everything should be done within international law". On 20 October, Starmer clarified that he only meant that Israel had the right to defend itself. Starmer had said that a ceasefire would better allow Hamas to make future attacks; instead, he called for a humanitarian pause to allow aid to reach Gaza.

On 15 November 2023, Starmer suffered his largest defeat as leader when 56 of his MPs (including ten frontbenchers) defied a three-line whip in voting for an SNP motion to support an immediate ceasefire in Gaza. In December 2023, Keir Starmer followed Rishi Sunak in changing his stance by calling for a "sustainable ceasefire" in relation to the conflict in Gaza. This also came after the Foreign Secretary David Cameron's same change in position. Starmer stated his support for a "two-stage" "two-state solution". During Starmer's tenure as leader, Labour saw a drop in party membership from a peak of 532,000 after the 2019 election to 370,450 in the runup to the 2024 election. More than 20,000 members left the party within two months in 2024, with blame placed on the party's stance on the Gazan genocide and green investment.

=== Shadow cabinet ===
Starmer's shadow cabinet initially comprised both the right and left of the Labour Party. Starmer reshuffled his shadow cabinet three times – firstly in May 2021, secondly in November 2021, and finally in September 2023. Starmer's reshuffles reduced the representation of the left and soft left on the opposition frontbench, while increasing the representation of the party's right. Notable changes included Rachel Reeves replacing Anneliese Dodds as Shadow Chancellor, the demotion of Lisa Nandy from Shadow Levelling-Up Secretary to Shadow Minister for International Development, and the replacement of Chief Whip Nick Brown with Alan Campbell. Resignations from Starmer's shadow cabinet included Andy McDonald and Rosena Allin-Khan.

=== Local election results ===
Starmer considered resigning after Labour's mixed results in the 2021 local elections, the first local elections of his leadership, but later felt "vindicated" by his decision to stay on, saying, "I did [consider quitting] because I didn't feel that I should be bigger than the party and that if I couldn't bring about the change, perhaps there should be a change. But actually, in the end, I reflected on it, talked to very many people and doubled down and determined, no, it is the change in the Labour Party we need".

During Starmer's tenure as Opposition Leader, his party suffered the loss of a previously safe Labour seat at the 2021 Hartlepool by-election, followed by holds at the 2021 Batley and Spen by-election, 2022 Birmingham Erdington by-election and 2022 City of Chester by-election, as well as a gain from the Conservatives at the 2022 Wakefield by-election. During the 2023 local elections, Labour gained more than 500 councillors and 22 councils, becoming the largest party in local government for the first time since 2002. Labour made further gains at the 2024 local elections, gaining from the Conservatives at the Blackpool South by-election and narrowly winning the West Midlands mayoral election.

=== 2024 general election ===
On 22 May 2024, Prime Minister Rishi Sunak announced that a general election would be held on 4 July 2024. Labour entered the general election with a large lead over the Conservatives in opinion polls (which had been the case since 2022), and the potential scale of the party's victory remained a topic of discussion throughout the campaign.

In June 2024 Starmer released the Labour Party's 2024 manifesto, Change, which focused on economic growth, planning system changes, infrastructure, what Starmer describes as "clean energy", healthcare, education, childcare, and strengthening workers' rights. It pledged a new publicly owned energy company (Great British Energy), a "Green Prosperity Plan", reducing patient waiting times in the NHS, and renationalisation of the railway network (Great British Railways). Promising wealth creation together with "pro-business and pro-worker" policies, the manifesto also pledged giving 16-year-olds the vote in all elections, reforming the House of Lords, and to tax private schools, with money generated going into improving state education. On taxes, the day after the manifesto was released, Starmer pledged that not only would income tax, National Insurance, and VAT not be increased, but that, per their manifesto, their plans were fully costed and funded and would not require tax increases.

Starmer led Labour to a landslide victory at the general election, characterised by commentators as a "loveless landslide", ending fourteen years of Conservative government with Labour becoming the largest party in the House of Commons. Labour achieved a 174-seat simple majority and a total of 411 seats, the party's third-best ever result in terms of seat-share (following the 1997 and 2001 general elections). The party became the largest in England for the first time since 2005, in Scotland for the first time since 2010 and retained its status as the largest party in Wales. Despite this, Labour won 34 per cent of the vote – the lowest of any party forming a majority government in the post-war era, leading to concerns about the proportionality of the election.

In his victory speech Starmer thanked Labour Party workers for their work – including nearly five years of revamping and rebranding Labour in the face of Conservative dominance – and urged them to savour the moment, but warned them of challenges ahead and pledged his government would seek "national renewal":

We did it! You campaigned for it, you fought for it, you voted for it and now it has arrived. Change begins now. And it feels good, I have to be honest. Four-and-a-half years of work changing the party. This is what it is for – a changed Labour Party ready to serve our country, ready to restore Britain to the service of working people. And across our country people will be waking up to the news, relieved that a weight has been lifted, a burden finally removed from the shoulders of this great nation. And now we can look forward. Walk into the morning, the sunlight of hope, pale at first but getting stronger through the day, shining once again, on a country with the opportunity after 14 years to get its future back. We said we would end the chaos and we will. We said we would turn the page and we have. Today we start the next chapter, begin the work of change, the mission of national renewal and start to rebuild our country.

— Keir Starmer on 5 July 2024, following his general election victory

== Term as Prime Minister (2024–2026) ==
=== Appointment ===
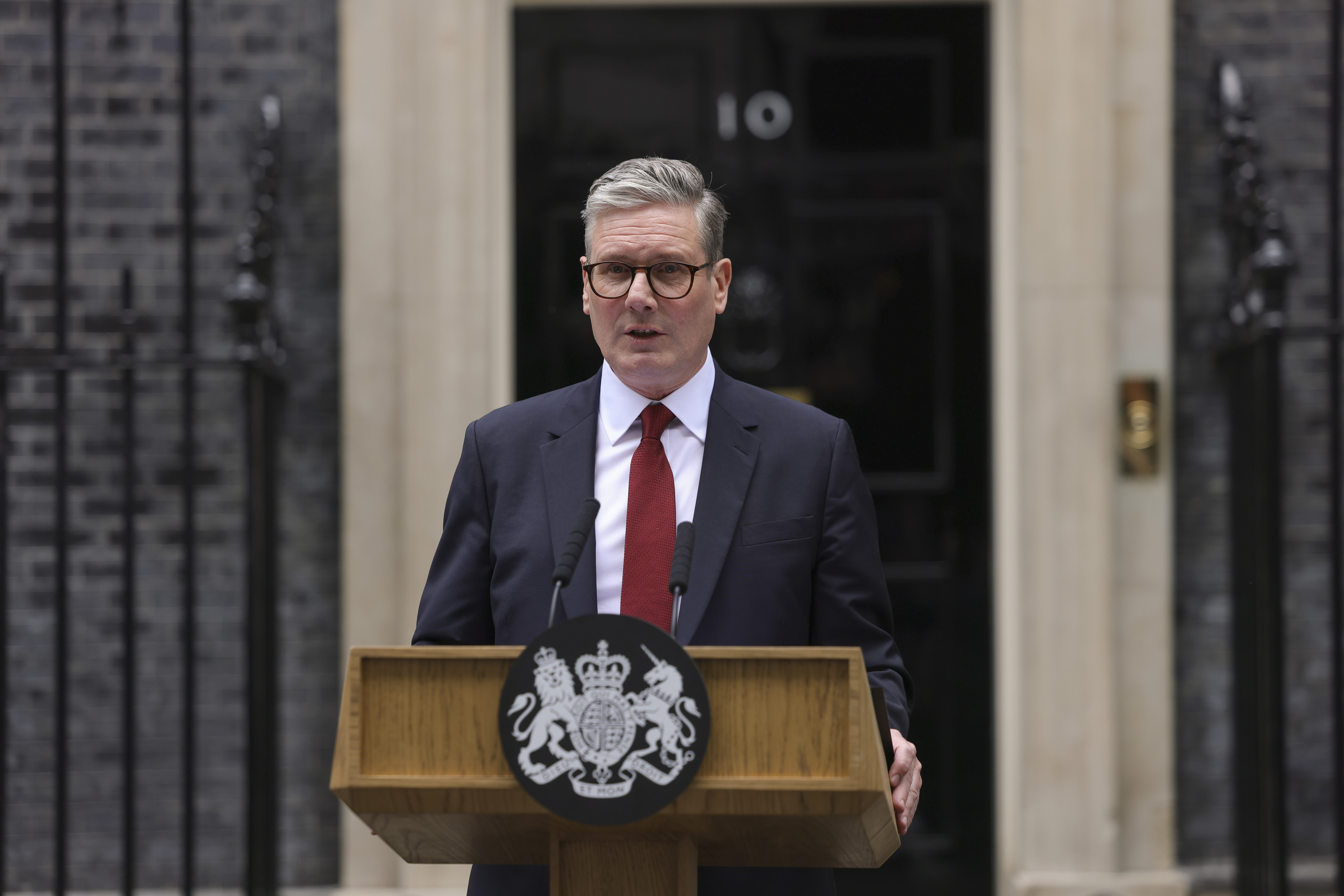
Starmer in Downing Street delivering his first speech as prime minister, 5 July 2024

As the leader of the majority party in the House of Commons, Starmer was appointed prime minister, First Lord of the Treasury and Minister for the Civil Service by King Charles III on 5 July 2024, becoming the first Labour prime minister since Gordon Brown in 2010 and the first one to win a general election since Tony Blair in 2005. He also became the first prime minister to enter office with a knighthood since Alec Douglas-Home. Starmer and his wife, Victoria, were driven from Buckingham Palace to Downing Street. Starmer stopped the car on the way back from the palace to go on a walkabout in Downing Street to meet cheering crowds.

In his first speech as prime minister, Starmer paid tribute to his predecessor, Rishi Sunak, saying "his achievement as the first British Asian prime minister of our country should not be underestimated by anyone" and he also recognised "the dedication and hard work he brought to his leadership", but added that the people of the UK had voted for change:

You have given us a clear mandate, and we will use it to deliver change. To restore service and respect to politics, end the era of noisy performance, tread more lightly on your lives, and unite our country. Four nations, standing together again, facing down, as we have so often in our past, the challenges of an insecure world. Committed to a calm and patient rebuilding. So with respect and humility, I invite you all to join this government of service in the mission of national renewal. Our work is urgent and we begin it today.

Other world leaders, including Joe Biden and Justin Trudeau, as well as Blair and Brown, congratulated Starmer upon his appointment as prime minister. One of his first acts was to declare the Rwanda asylum plan "dead": the Home Secretary, Yvette Cooper, would establish a Border Security Command to tackle smuggling gangs which facilitate illegal migrant crossings over the English Channel. Starmer went on a tour of the four nations of the UK, meeting with leaders including John Swinney, Michelle O'Neill, and Vaughan Gething. He also met the twelve regional mayors and announced the establishment of the Council of the Nations and Regions. On 24 July 2024 he attended his first Prime Minister's Questions in the Commons.

=== Cabinet ===
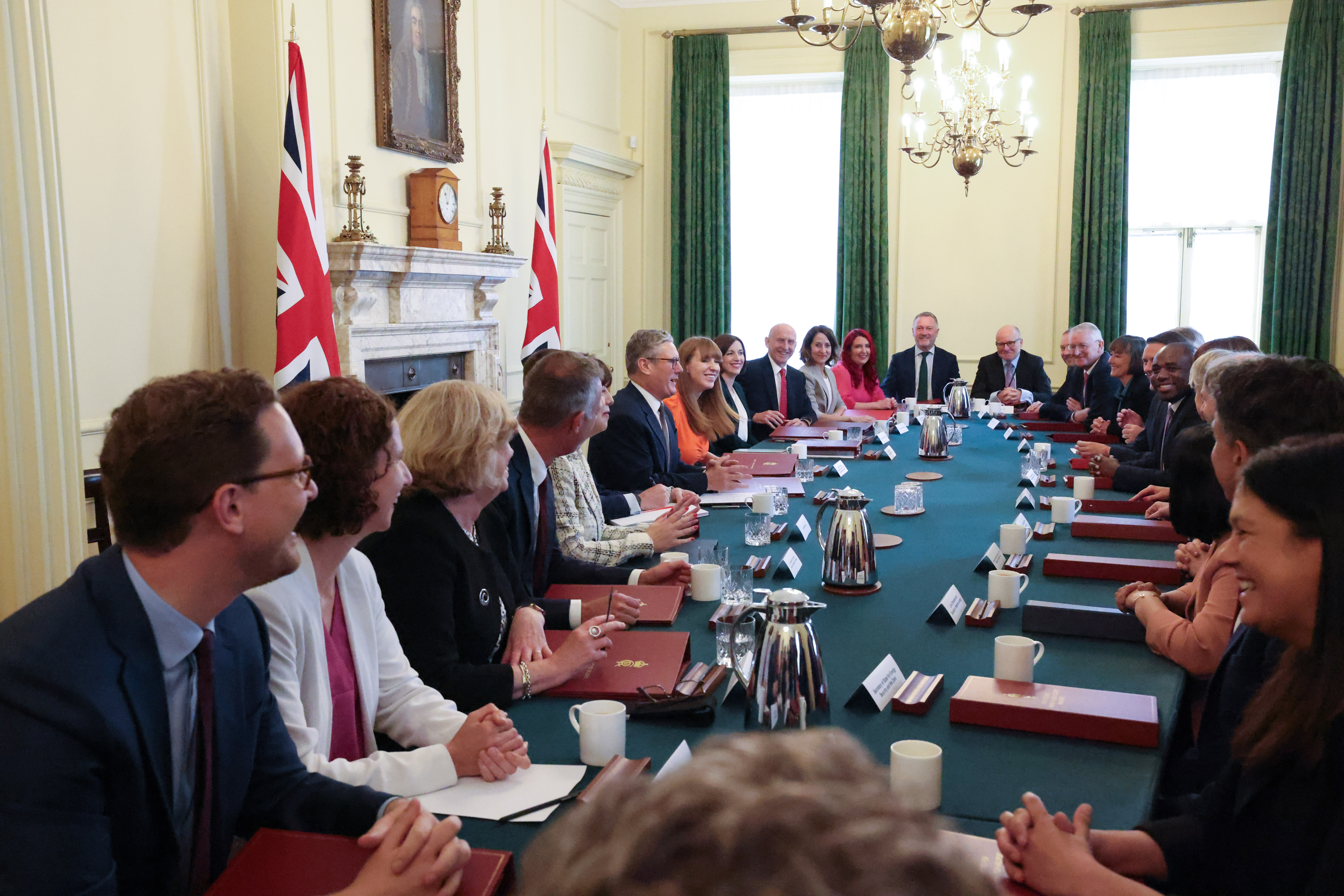
Starmer convening his first Cabinet meeting on 6 July 2024

Starmer set about appointing a new Cabinet, which first met on 6 July, and he completed his ministerial appointments on 7 July. Parliament was then recalled to meet on 9 July. Among Starmer's ministerial appointments were the scientist Patrick Vallance as Minister of State for Science, the rehabilitation campaigner James Timpson as Minister of State for Prisons, Parole and Probation, and the international law expert Richard Hermer as Attorney General for England and Wales, who were created life peers to sit in the House of Lords. The new government also contains a few ministers from the New Labour Blair/Brown governments, including Hilary Benn, Yvette Cooper, David Lammy, and Ed Miliband in Cabinet, and Jacqui Smith and Douglas Alexander as junior ministers.

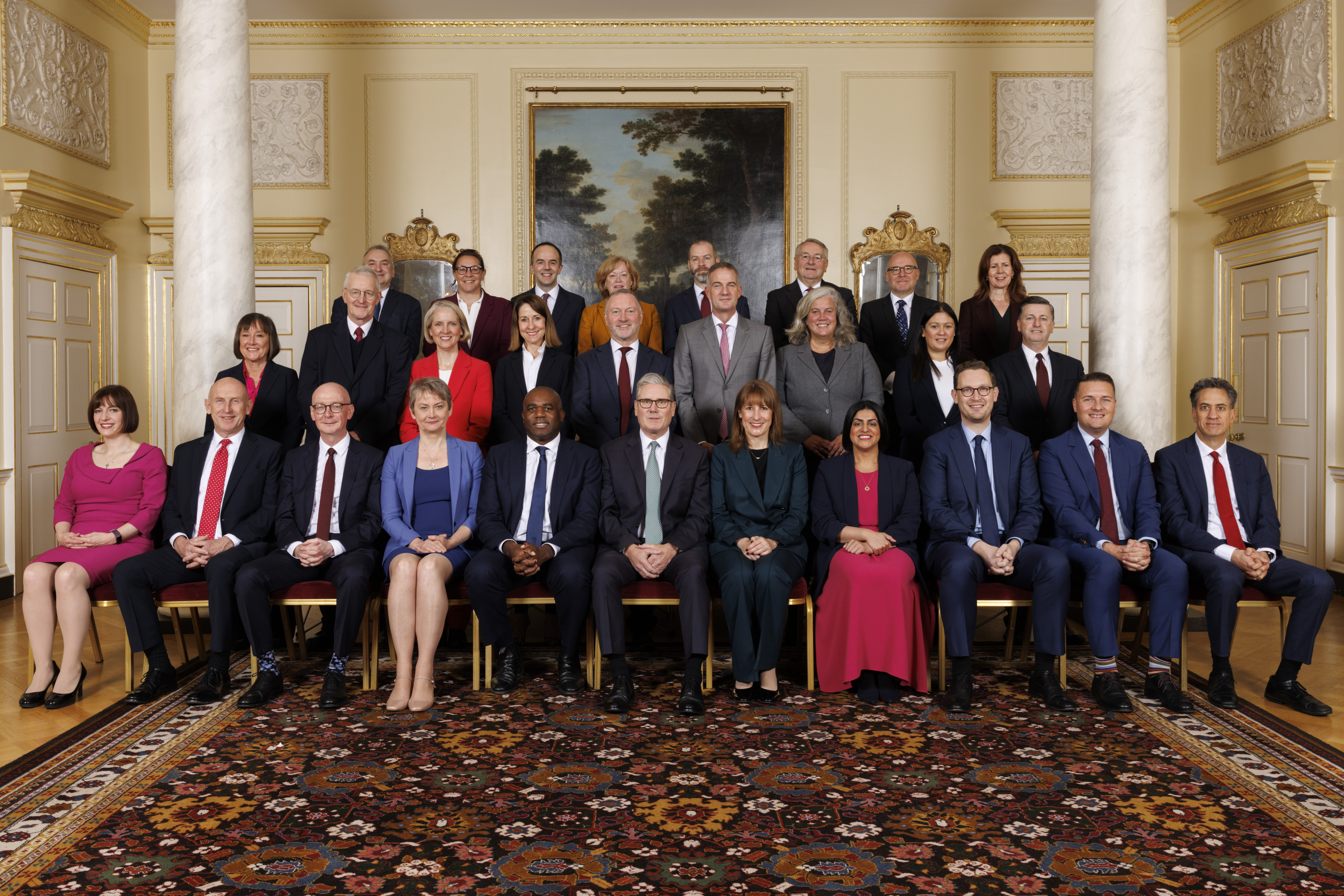
Starmer's reshuffled cabinet in October 2025

In September 2025, Starmer's deputy Angela Rayner resigned over a tax scandal in what was described as a damaging blow to Starmer's leadership. Following Rayner's resignation, Starmer conducted the first major reshuffle of his premiership.

=== Peter Mandelson ===
In December 2024, Starmer appointed Peter Mandelson to serve as British ambassador to the United States. Starmer dismissed Mandelson in September 2025 over his association with Jeffrey Epstein. In February 2026, during Prime Minister's Questions, Starmer said that Mandelson had "lied repeatedly" during vetting about his long-term relationship with Epstein. Starmer said he regretted the appointment and announced that, with the King's agreement, Mandelson had been removed from the Privy Council for bringing it into disrepute. The Mandelson scandal was significant for his premiership, and led to the resignation of Starmer's Chief of Staff Morgan McSweeney on 8 February 2026 as well as his Director of Communications Tim Allan the following day. Hours after Allan announced his resignation, Scottish Labour leader Anas Sarwar called on Starmer to quit as Prime Minister, but cabinet ministers responded by voicing their support for Starmer.

In April 2026, it was reported that Mandelson had failed security vetting for the role of ambassador. The Foreign Office, which Starmer accused of deliberately withholding information from him, overruled the recommendation of the vetting agency and allowed Mandelson to take up the post. Starmer faced calls to resign over allegations he misled Parliament when he said "full due process" was followed during the appointment.

=== Public opinion ===
Starmer was viewed unfavourably by the British public during his tenure as prime minister. Starmer's average approval rating fell from +5% after the election to −30% by January 2025 before levelling off until April 2025 when it began to decline further, reaching −46% by November that year. A poll by Ipsos indicates that Starmer is the most unpopular prime minister since Ipsos's records began in 1977. It found 13% of the public were satisfied with Starmer's job performance, 79% dissatisfied, giving a net approval rating of minus 66. Starmer's average net approval remained higher than Boris Johnson's during the Partygate scandal, Jeremy Corbyn's when he resigned as Labour leader and when Liz Truss resigned as prime minister.

Starmer's unpopularity was tied to poor results for Labour in the 2025 United Kingdom local elections, 2026 United Kingdom local elections and 2026 Senedd election. An opinion-piece in Politico viewed this as a likely catalyst for a leadership challenge.

In September 2025, The Guardian reported that plans to replace Starmer had begun among groups of MPs. The reports were instigated by briefings to the media from Starmer's allies, which stated that he would resist any attempted challenge to his leadership. By November, further reports emerged that plans to replace Starmer with Wes Streeting could be enacted after the November 2025 United Kingdom budget. Shortly thereafter, Clive Lewis became the first Labour MP to publicly call for Starmer's resignation.

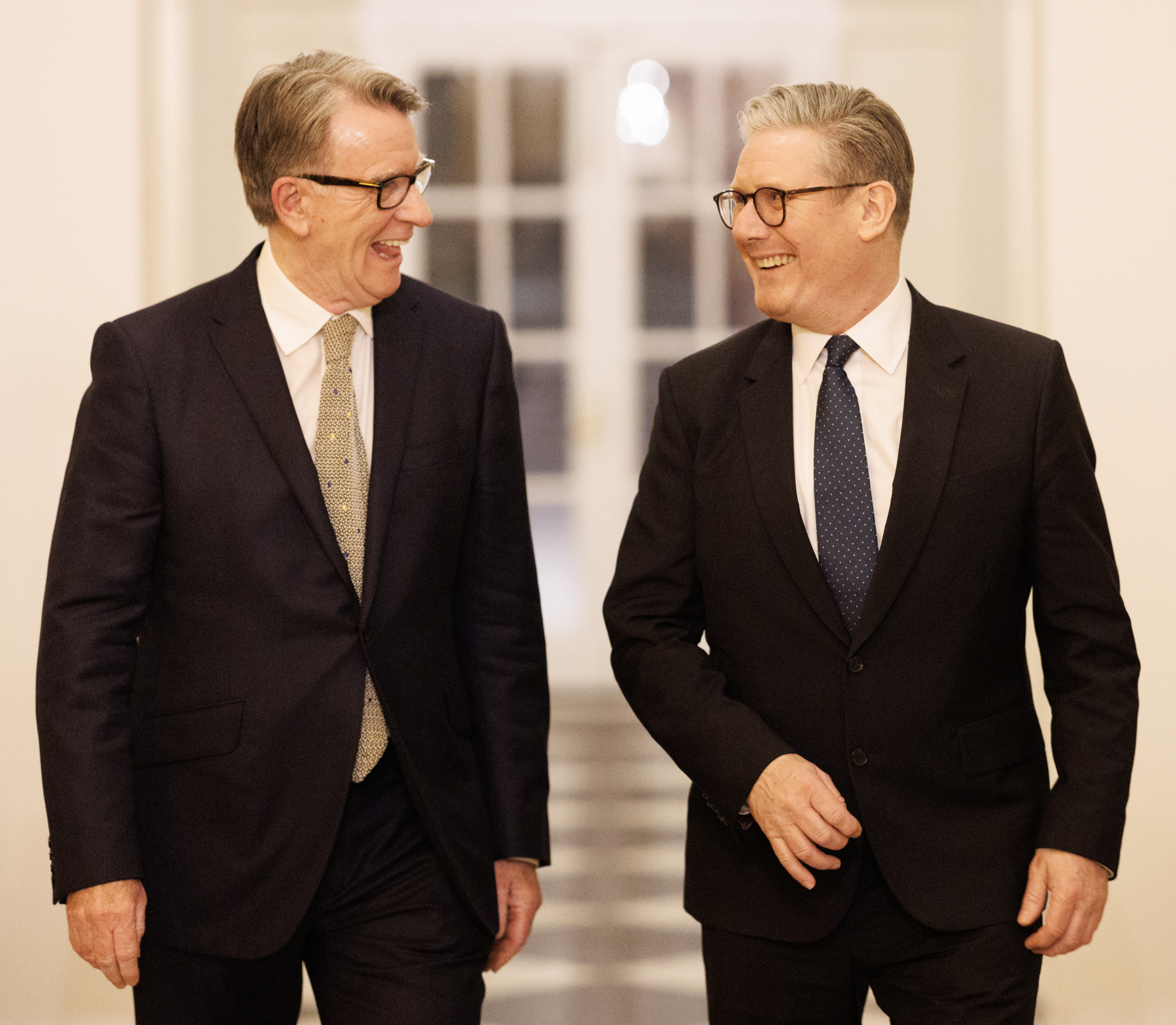
Peter Mandelson and Starmer in February 2025

A YouGov poll for The Times in February 2026 indicates that 51% of respondents thought Starmer was either more sleazy or as sleazy as Boris Johnson. The poll found that 43% of participants did not think Starmer had handled the Peter Mandelson scandal well; 23% thought that he had; 14% thought Starmer had shown good judgement in his handling of the affair.

=== Domestic policy ===
Domestically, Starmer said that his primary concerns would be economic growth, reforming the planning system, infrastructure, energy, healthcare, education, childcare, and strengthening workers' rights, as set out in Labour's 2024 election manifesto. The 2024 State Opening of Parliament outlined 39 bills that Labour proposed to introduce in the months ahead, including ones to renationalise the railways, to bring local bus services under local public control, to strengthen the rights of workers, to tackle illegal immigration, to reform the House of Lords, and to undertake a programme to speed up the delivery of "high quality infrastructure" and housing. In addition, a number of bills proposed by the previous Conservative government were also included, notably the Tobacco and Vapes Bill, which featured in the 2023 King's Speech, but had been abandoned when the election was called. Skills England, a body whose objective will be to reduce the need for overseas employees by improving skills training for people in England, was launched on 22 July.

==== Economy ====
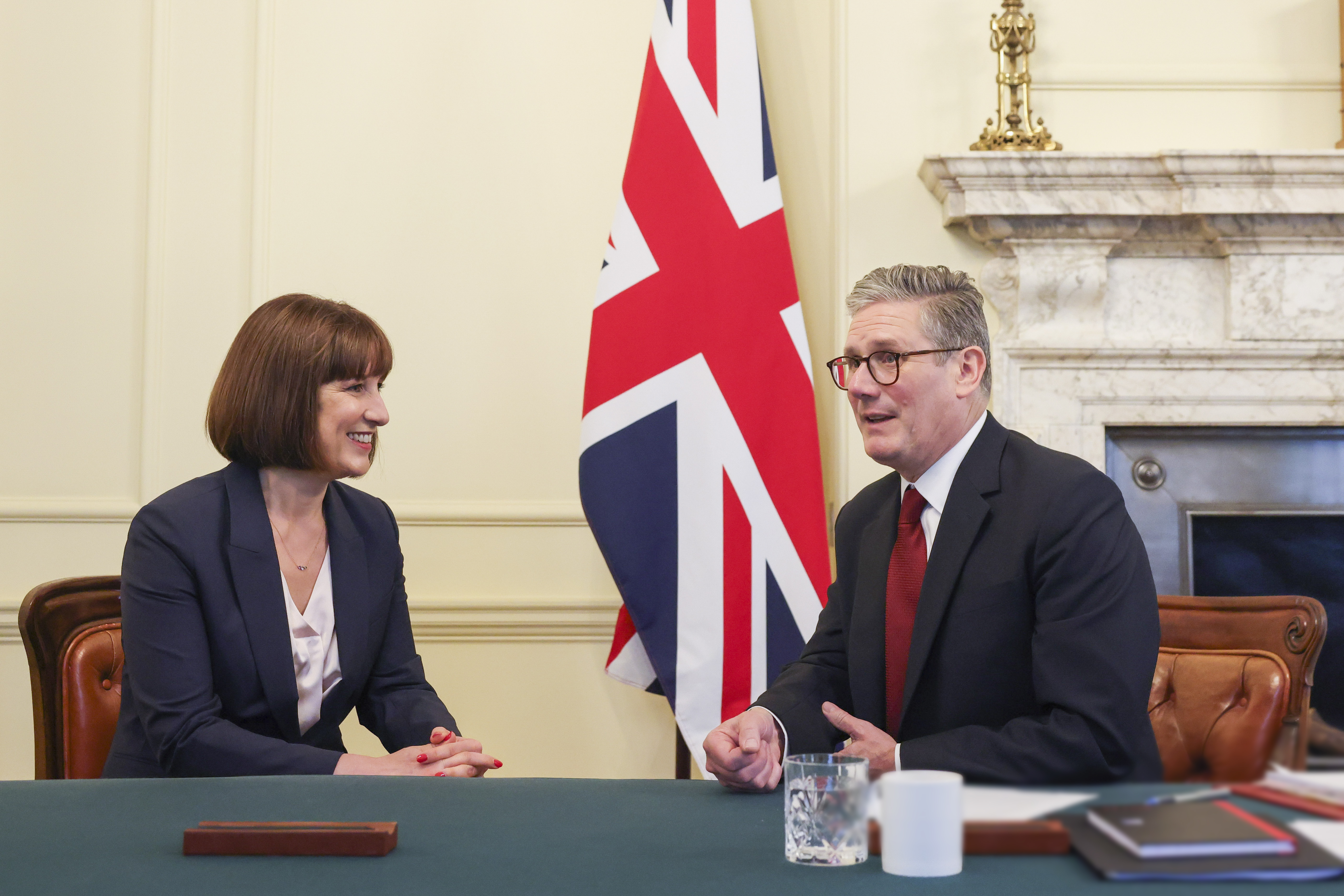
Starmer with Reeves, 6 July 2024

The new chancellor of the exchequer, Rachel Reeves, accused the previous government of leaving a £21.9 billion "black hole", and announced on 29 July 2024 that certain winter fuel payments would be scrapped for around 10 million pensioners. Following criticism of the plan, Starmer defended the scrapping of these winter fuel payments, arguing that he had to make "tough decisions to stabilise the economy". On 10 September 2024, the government benches defeated a Conservative Party motion in Parliament by a majority of 120 to block the measure. On 9 June 2025, the government, in what was described as a 'major U-turn', announced that it would reverse most of the cuts, restoring winter fuel payments to 9 million pensioners, citing improved public finances.

Starmer's Labour Government inherited a number of ongoing industrial disputes from the preceding Conservative Government and agreed on pay deals with trade unions representing NHS and railway workers, ending strikes in the first few months of taking office. In August 2024, Starmer's government agreed to increase public-sector worker pay by 5 to 7 per cent.

On 10 October 2024 the Government introduced the Employment Rights Bill, which became an Act of Parliament in December 2025. This includes an increase in minimum wages and a number of rights, such as immediate protection against unfair dismissal and the entitlement for employees to request flexible working arrangements unless the employer can demonstrate that such arrangements are impractical. The government's inaugural International Investment Summit was held on 14 October 2024 at the Guildhall in London.

The October 2024 budget was presented to the House of Commons by Chancellor of the Exchequer Rachel Reeves on 30 October 2024. It covered Labour's fiscal plans, with a focus on investment, healthcare, education, childcare, sustainable energy, transport, and worker's rights enrichment. The National Minimum Wage is set to increase by 6.7 per cent (reaching £12.21 per hour) and a £22.6 billion increase in the day-to-day health budget was announced, with a £3.1 billion increase in the capital budget. That includes £1 billion for hospital repairs and rebuilding projects. The government plans to allocate £5 billion for housing investment in the fiscal year 2025–26, with a focus on enhancing the availability of affordable housing. Education will receive £6.7 billion of capital investment, a 19 per cent real-terms increase. This includes £1.4 billion to rebuild more than 500 schools.

The June 2025 Spending Review was presented to the House of Commons by the Chancellor, allocating day-to-day budgets for the years between 2025/26 and 2028/29 and capital budgets for the years between 2025/26 and 2029/30. It included £14.2 billion for a new nuclear power station at Sizewell C, £15 billion for transport projects outside London, and £39 billion over a decade for social and affordable housing.

==== Immigration ====
One of Starmer's first acts was the cancellation of the controversial Rwanda asylum plan, describing it as "dead and buried". Cooper established the Border Security Command to tackle smuggling gangs which facilitate illegal migrant crossings over the English Channel.

Following the publication in November 2024 of the record net migration figure updated from the previously estimated 728,000 to 906,000 for the year to June 2023, and of the 20% drop to 728,000 for the year to the end of June 2024 as a result of rule changes by the then Conservative government, Starmer said he would introduce policies aimed at reducing immigration levels.

In a May 2025 speech and associated white paper on the topic of immigration, Starmer said that the UK risked becoming an "island of strangers", and that high immigration had done "incalculable damage" to society. The white paper outlined changes aimed at reducing immigration, including training for people in the UK. His language was criticised by the left for its perceived echoes of Enoch Powell's Rivers of Blood speech. In June, Starmer apologised for his "island of strangers" comment, saying that the phrase "wasn't right" and "I deeply regret using it". He said that he and his speechwriters had been unaware of the similarity with Powell's words.

On 10 July 2025, Starmer announced that a new "one in, one out" migrant deal with France would begin within weeks. In early September 2025, it was reported that 3,567 people had arrived on the UK's shores since the deal with France was ratified in August, however returns had not yet commenced. On 15 September 2025, the first "one in, one out" migrant flight, which was due to fly one migrant from London to Paris on an Air France flight, was cancelled due to protests from charities and threats of legal action. On 16 September 2025, deportation flights were cancelled again due to legal challenges and protests. Further that day it was reported that a 25-year-old Eritrean asylum seeker who had arrived on a small boat on 12 August 2025, would not be deported as planned on 17 September, after he won his High Court bid to have the removal temporarily blocked. As part of his immigration reform, on 18 November 2025, the 2025 UK refugee plan was presented to Parliament by Shabana Mahmood.

In November 2025, Starmer described the decrease in net migration to 204,000 as a "step in the right direction". Entries for the year ending June 2025 were 898,000, departures were 693,000.

==== Healthcare ====
On 11 September 2024 Starmer pledged that there would be no more money for the NHS without reform. In response to the report from a nine-week review conducted by the peer and NHS surgeon Lord Darzi, which said that the NHS in England was in a critical condition, Starmer said the solution was reform, not money, and that there will be no more money without reform.

In Government, Starmer reaffirmed the outgoing Conservative government's commitment of no new HIV cases in the United Kingdom by 2030. On 10 February 2025 Starmer, alongside the singer and HIV activist Beverley Knight and the Terrence Higgins Trust chief executive Richard Angell, recorded himself taking a rapid HIV home test. This made Starmer the first serving British prime minister and serving G7 leader to take a test on camera. In March 2025 Starmer, along with Health Secretary Wes Streeting announced a two-year plan to abolish NHS England, saying it would to reduce bureaucracy and increase funding available for more effective purposes within the service.

==== Welfare and pensions ====
Starmer initially declined to abolish the two-child benefit cap introduced by the Cameron–Clegg coalition government in 2013, citing financial reasons. On 23 July 2024 Labour withdrew the whip from seven of its MPs who had supported an amendment tabled by the Scottish National Party's Westminster parliamentary leader Stephen Flynn to scrap it, with Flynn saying that scrapping the cap would immediately raise 300,000 children out of poverty. MPs rejected the SNP amendment by 363 votes to 103. The seven Labour MPs suspended for six months were John McDonnell, Richard Burgon, Ian Byrne, Apsana Begum, Imran Hussain, Zarah Sultana, and Rebecca Long-Bailey, all of whom sat as independents; all MPs, (with the exception of Sultana, who resigned from the party in July 2025 to co-found Your Party with former Labour Leader Jeremy Corbyn), were later readmitted to the Parliamentary Labour Party. A Child Poverty Taskforce was launched by Starmer, in which expert officials from across government would work together on how best to support more than four million children living in poverty. Starmer eventually u-turned in November 2025, abolishing the two-child benefit cap in that month's fiscal budget.

In July 2025 the government's Universal Credit Bill passed the House of Commons. It will increase the standard rate of Universal Credit. The measures reduce the health-related aspect of universal credit for certain claimants, but they make sure that other parts of the benefit increase beyond inflation.

==== Education ====
Starmer's government has imposed VAT on private school fees, expanded free school meals to 500,000 more children, and opened 750 free breakfast clubs in primary schools. It also presided over an increase in tuition fees for higher education in England along with an increase in maintenance loans.

==== Criminal justice ====
Shortly after taking office, Starmer said that there were "too many prisoners", and described the previous government as having acted "almost beyond recklessness". Saying it would help manage prison overcrowding, the newly appointed Justice Secretary, Shabana Mahmood, announced the implementation of an early release scheme which allowed for prisoners in England and Wales to be released after serving 40 per cent of their sentences rather than the 50 per cent previously introduced under the last government. Over 1,700 prisoners were released in September, with further releases expected in the following year. It then emerged that one prisoner released early under the scheme was charged with sexual assault relating to an alleged offence against a woman on the same day he was freed. Starmer has defended the releasing of prisoners, and accused the previous government of having "broke[n] the prison system", with plans to build new prisons.

Critics have accused Starmer's government of two-tier policing, which has led to these critics labelling him with the moniker "Two-Tier Keir". Allegations of two-tier policing were prevalent during the Southport riots in August 2024 and the subsequent arrest of rioters and some of their supporters, such as Lucy Connolly, along with the Epping protests in July 2025. Conversely, critics such as Jamie Driscoll believe that the police are more favourable to right-wing protests and more heavy-handed against left-wing protests and groups such as Palestine Action, which was proscribed by Starmer's government in 2025.

==== 2024 England and Northern Ireland riots ====
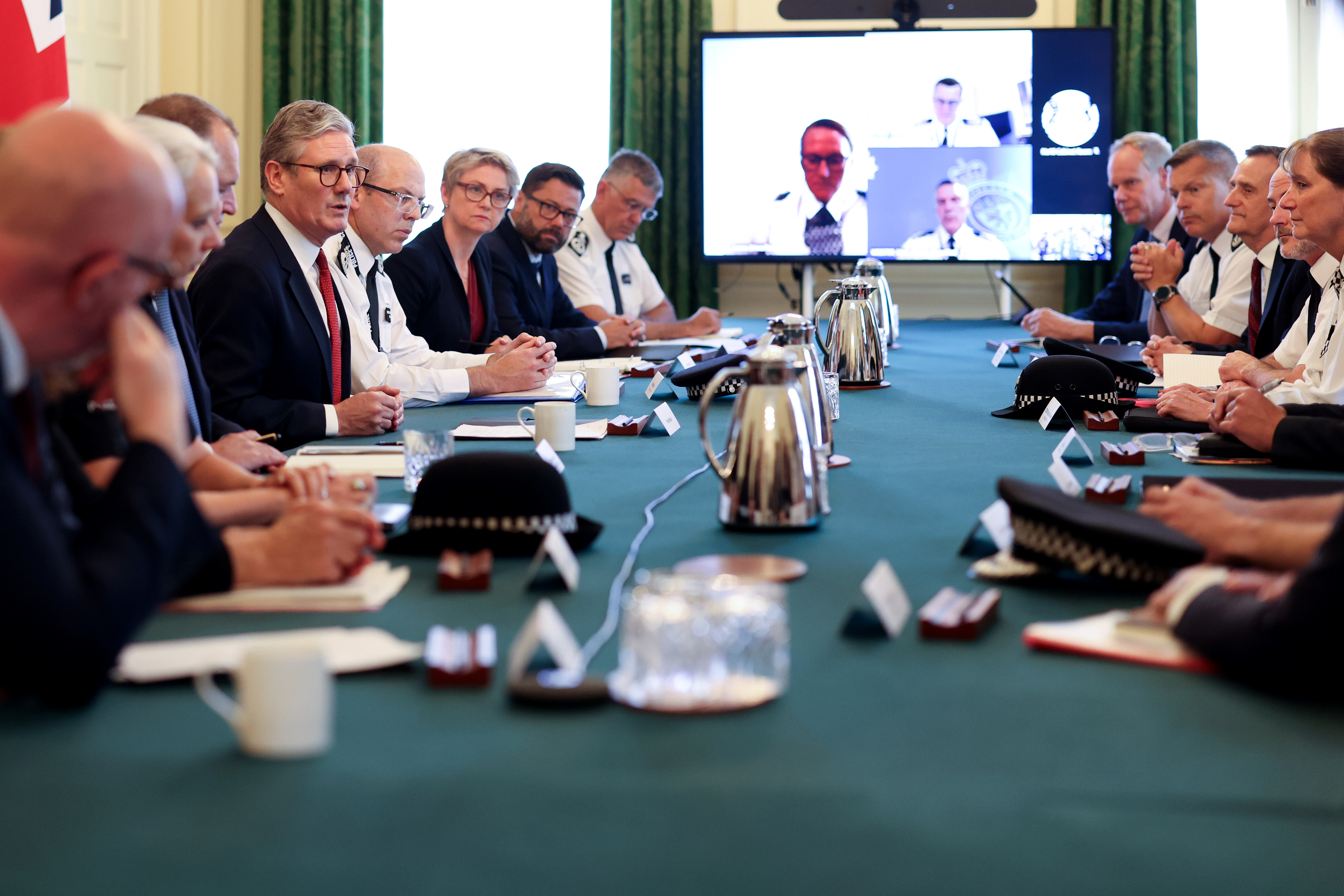
Starmer receives senior British police officers at 10 Downing Street, 1 August 2024.

Following the 2024 Southport stabbing, in which three young girls were killed, Starmer described the incident as horrendous and shocking and thanked emergency services for their swift response. He visited Southport and laid flowers at the scene, where he was heckled by some members of the public. Starmer later wrote amidst the riots across England and Northern Ireland following the stabbing that those who had "hijacked the vigil for the victims" had "insulted the community as it grieves" and that rioters would feel the full force of the law.

On 1 August, and following a meeting with senior police officers, Starmer announced the establishment of a National Violent Disorder Programme to facilitate greater cooperation between police forces when dealing with violent disorder. On 4 August Starmer stated that rioters "will feel the full force of the law" and that "You will regret taking part in this, whether directly or those whipping up this action online and then running away themselves". He added "I won't shy away from calling it what it is – far-right thuggery". Starmer later called an emergency response meeting of COBRA. After the COBRA meeting, Starmer ordered a "standing army" to be set up to tackle the ongoing "far-right" riots. This was possible under the special emergency powers which were first used 40 years ago under the Ridley Plan, to tackle striking miners in 1984 and 1985.

Following the 2024 UK riots, the Starmer government announced that it is reviewing the Online Safety Act 2023 with the possibility of strengthening its provisions.

Starmer rejected calls from some MPs – including the Labour MP Diane Abbott, the Reform UK leader Nigel Farage and the Conservative MP Dame Priti Patel – to recall Parliament to Westminster. After he said "large social media companies and those who run them" were contributing to the disorder, Elon Musk, the owner of the social media website X, criticised Starmer for not condemning all participants and only blaming the far-right. Musk further said Starmer was not protecting all communities in the United Kingdom, which he said had a "two-tier" policing system.

==== Acceptance of gifts ====
In September 2024, Starmer and fellow senior government ministers faced criticism for accepting gifts from Labour donors. Starmer also faced accusations of breaking parliamentary rules by not declaring £5,000 worth of clothes bought for his wife by the Labour donor Lord Alli. That same month, Sky News reported that Starmer had received £107,145 in gifts, benefits, and hospitality since December 2019, which was two-and-a-half times more than any other MP.

=== Defence ===
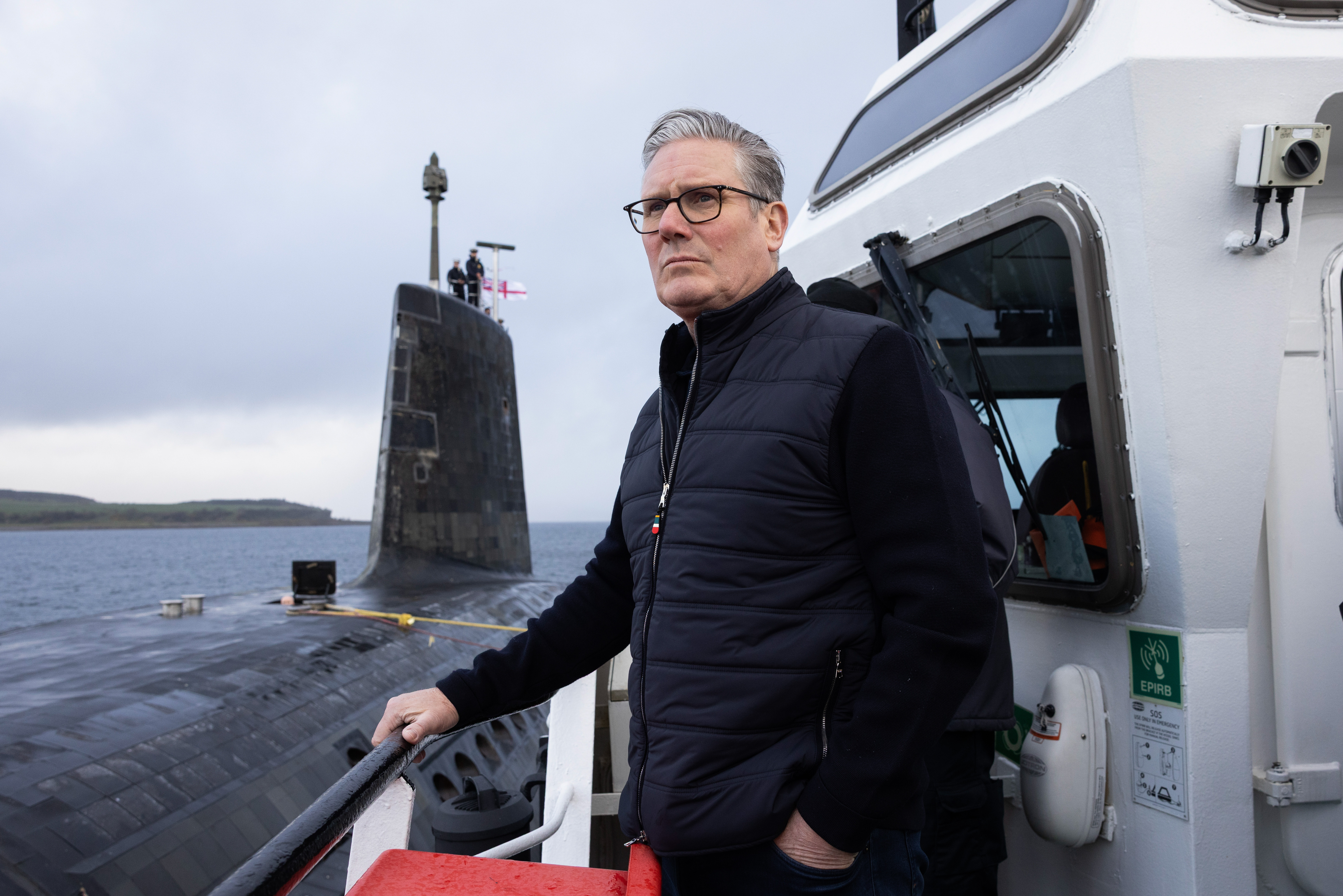
Starmer visiting a Vanguard-class submarine which provide Britain's nuclear deterrent

On 25 February 2025, Starmer announced that the previous government's commitment to reaching 2.5% of GDP spending on defence by 2030 would be brought forward to April 2027. This would be funded by reducing the official development assistance budget from 0.5% to 0.3%. George Robertson, a former Secretary General of NATO and Labour politician, led the 2025 Strategic Defence Review to guide the future increased spending, with Starmer commenting that the UK was moving to "war-fighting readiness" and that "everything we do will add to the strength of NATO".

In June 2025, Starmer announced the purchase of F-35A aircraft capable of deploying US nuclear weapons as part of NATO's dual capable aircraft nuclear mission, which his office said would be "the biggest strengthening of the UK's nuclear posture in a generation".

The Defence Investment Plan to implement the review was expected to be issued in autumn 2025. However this was delayed amid warnings that there was a £28 billion funding gap for shortfalls on previous commitments. The Public Accounts Committee reported that the delay was undermining the UK's credibility with NATO allies and confidence within the defence industrial base. On 11 June 2026, just before the planned Defence Investment Plan publication, Defence Secretary John Healey and his junior minister Al Carns resigned citing disagreement with the very limited spending increase given in the plan.

The Defence Investment Plan was announced by Starmer on 30 June 2026, after he had announced his resignation as prime minister and Leader of the Labour Party. The plan increased spending by about £1.5 billion over the previous draft, though funding for all the spending was not initially allocated.

=== Foreign policy ===
Politico reported that Starmer divided his time half and half between foreign and domestic matters, and in his first 17 months as prime minister visited 44 countries on 37 trips from the UK. Starmer said it would not be possible for a Prime Minister to spend less time on foreign matters in current circumstances.

==== United States ====
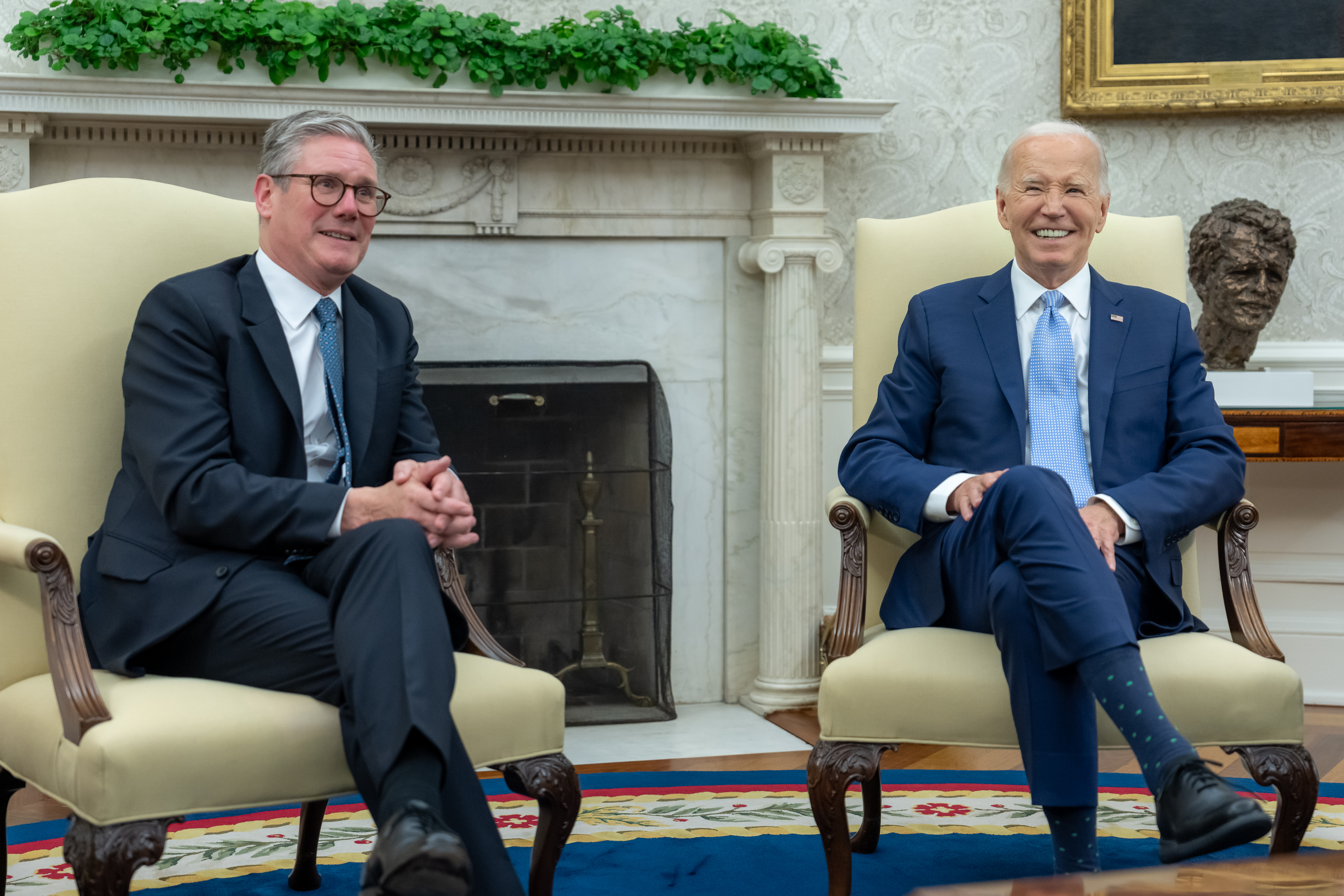
Starmer with US president Joe Biden in the Oval Office, 10 July 2024

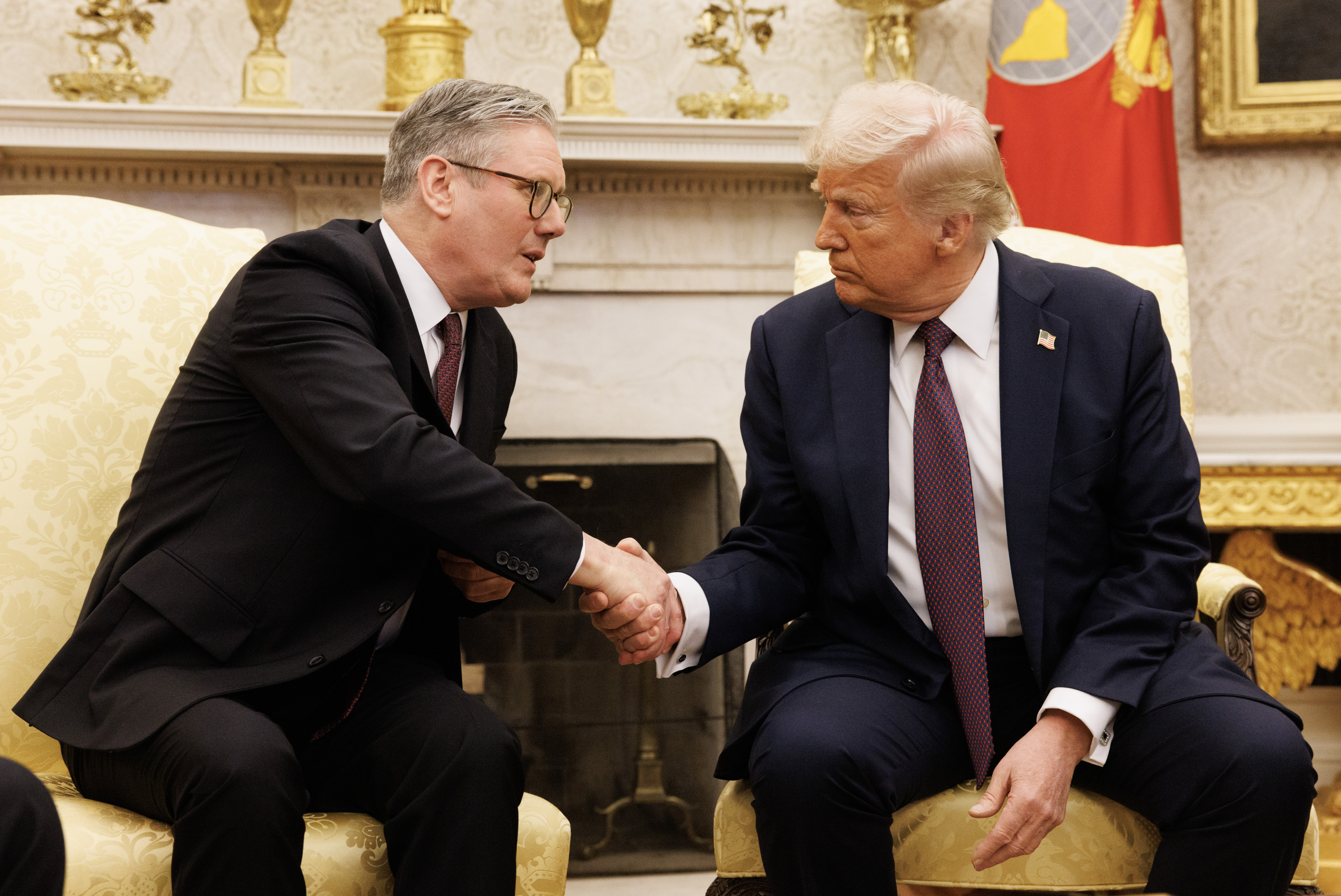
Starmer with US president Donald Trump in the Oval Office, 27 February 2025

In July 2024, following the 2024 general election, US president Joe Biden congratulated Starmer on "a hell of a victory". Starmer and Biden discussed their shared commitment to the Special Relationship between the US and the UK, as well as their mutual support of Ukraine.

Following the attempted assassination of Donald Trump in July 2024, the former president of the United States at the time, Starmer posted on Twitter saying "Political violence in any form has no place in our societies" and extended his best wishes to Trump and his family.

In September 2024, during a visit to New York City to address the UN General Assembly, Starmer met the American Republican Party presidential candidate, Trump, at Trump Tower. Following the meeting, Starmer said it was "good" to have met with Trump and that the meeting was an opportunity for both Trump and Starmer to establish a working relationship. Following Trump's election victory in the 2024 United States presidential election, Starmer called Trump to formally congratulate him on 6 November and was assured that the "special relationship" between the United Kingdom and United States "would continue to thrive".

In February 2025, Starmer met with President Trump at the White House to discuss continued support to Ukraine and a potential peace deal. They additionally discussed a potential trade deal. He also presented a handwritten letter from King Charles III inviting the President to a historic second state visit to the UK.

In June 2025 Starmer supported Israel in the Twelve-Day War and United States strikes on Iranian nuclear sites, stating that "Iran can never be allowed to develop a nuclear weapon and the US has taken action to alleviate that threat".

==== NATO ====
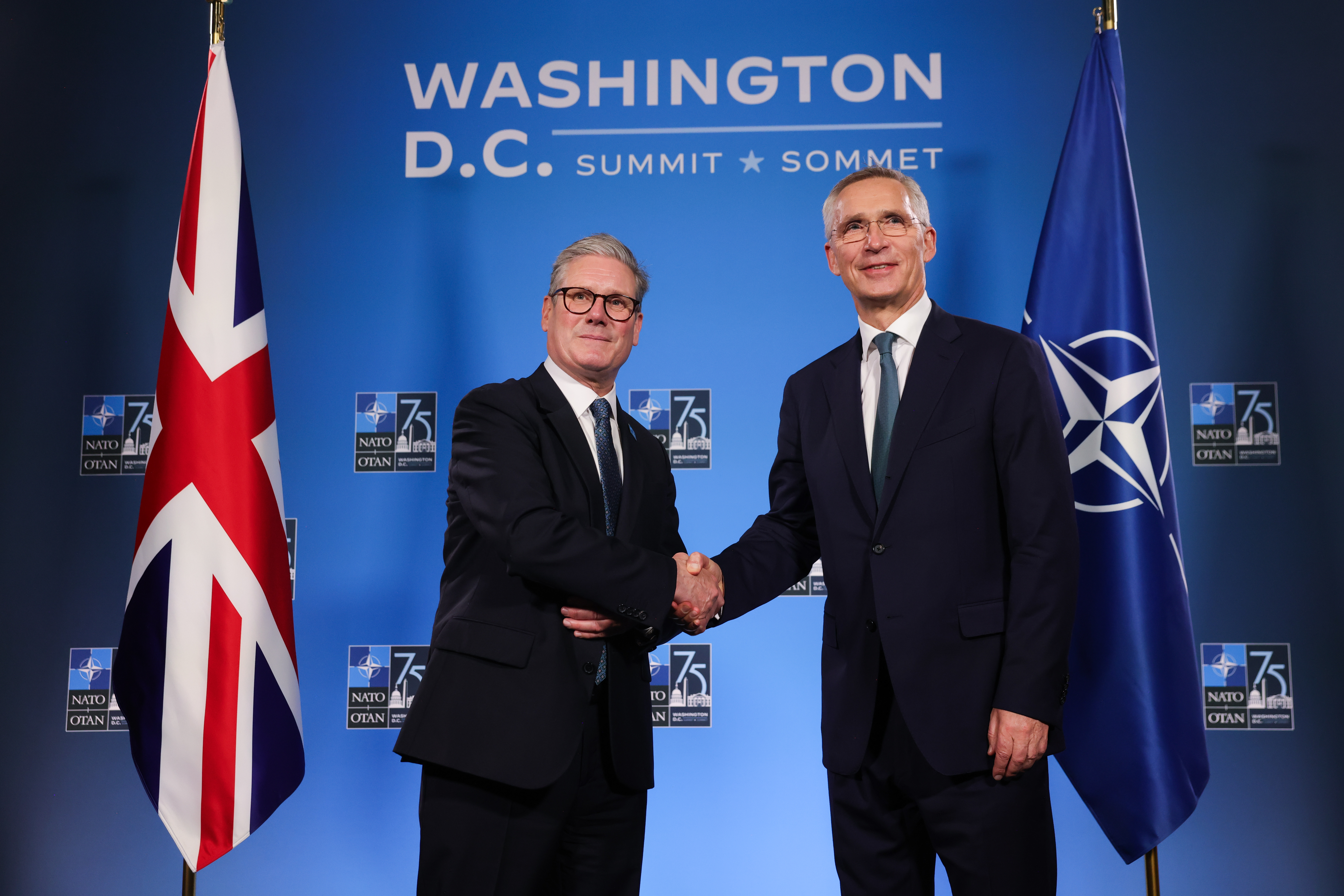
Starmer and Secretary-General Jens Stoltenberg at the NATO summit in 2024

The first overseas meeting Starmer attended as prime minister was the 2024 NATO summit held in Washington from 9 to 11 July 2024. On the flight to the summit, Starmer laid out a "cast iron" commitment to increase defence spending to the NATO target of 2.5 per cent of GDP in line with the NATO target, following a "root and branch" review of British armed forces.

==== Europe ====
Since he became prime minister, Starmer has sought to "reset" UK relations with the European Union following Brexit, which he opposed. He met with a number of European leaders during his first few months in office.

On 27 August 2024, Starmer and German Chancellor Olaf Scholz announced talks to revise a Germany-UK co-operation agreement covering areas including defence, energy security, and science and technology.

==== Russo-Ukrainian war ====
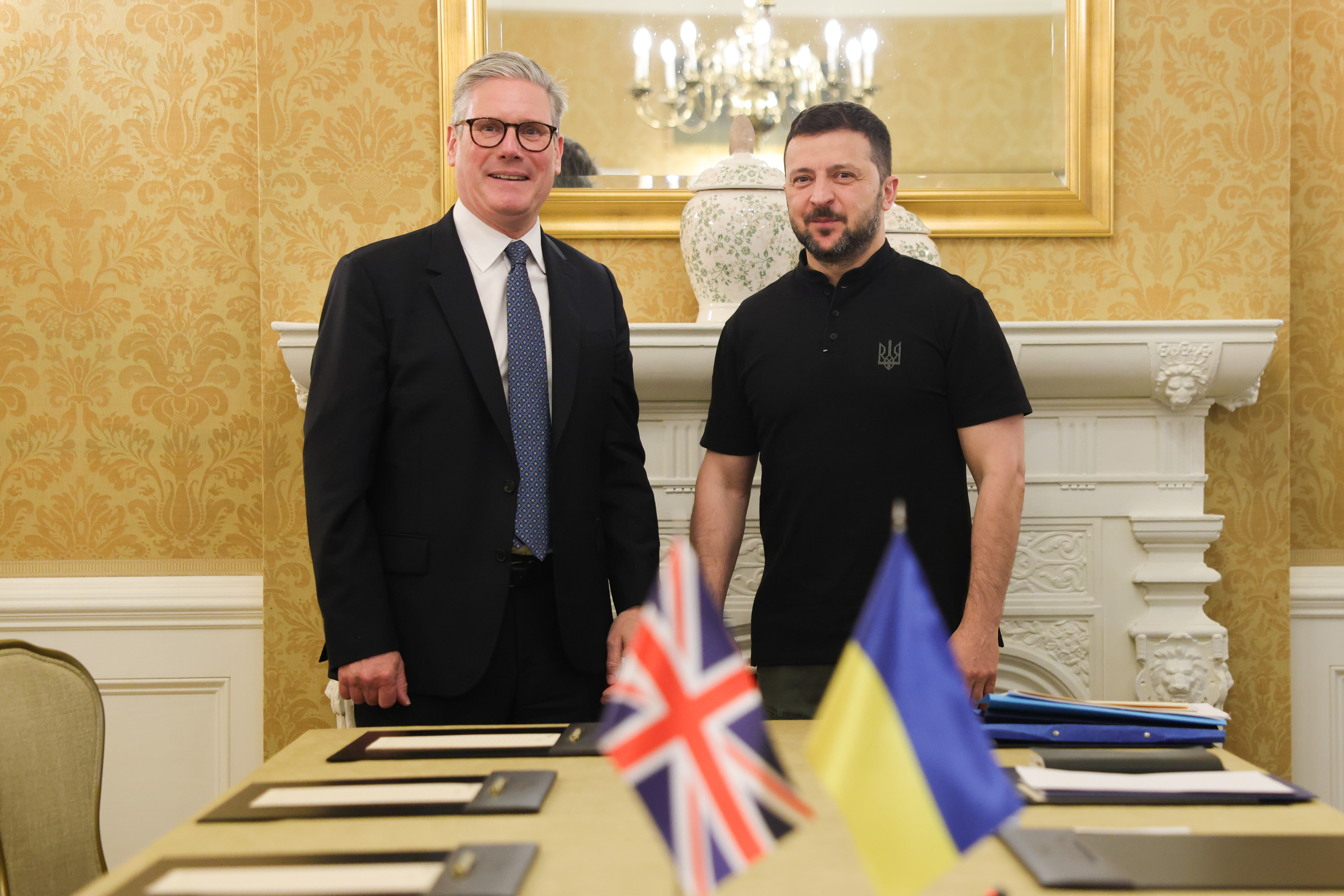
Starmer with Ukrainian president Volodymyr Zelenskyy, 10 July 2024

At the 2024 NATO summit, Starmer signalled that Ukraine could use British Storm Shadow missiles, sent by HMG by way of military aid, to strike military targets inside Russia, during the Russian invasion of Ukraine. In a meeting with Ukrainian president Volodymyr Zelenskyy Starmer called for an "irreversible" membership strategy for Ukraine to join NATO.

Following a heated meeting between US President Trump and President Zelenskyy at the White House, Starmer organised a summit of European leaders in London. Among the things discussed at the summit were continued support for Ukraine, security guarantees for the country and peace efforts.

==== China ====
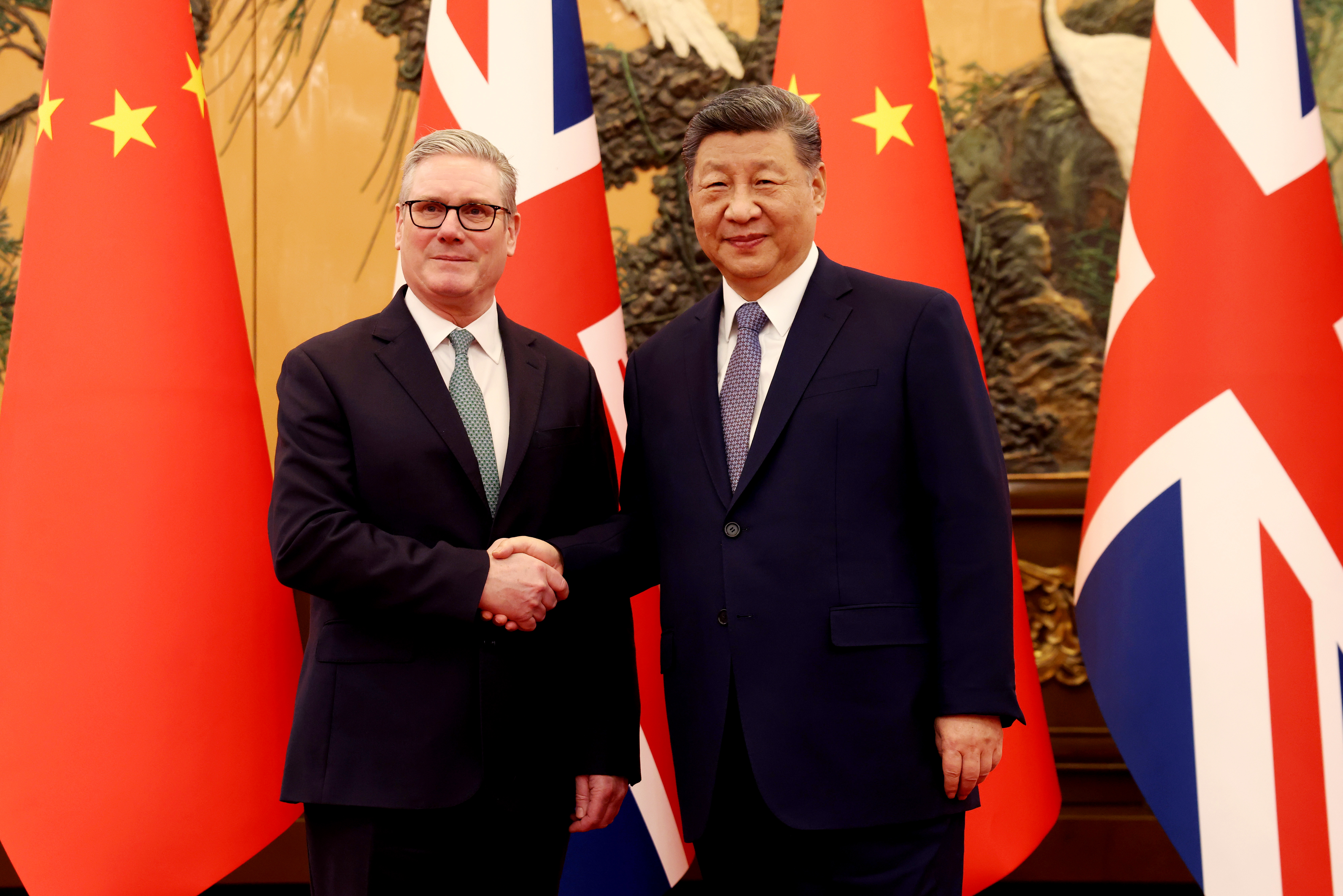
Starmer with Chinese president Xi Jinping, 30 January 2026

In November 2024, Starmer met Chinese president Xi Jinping at the G20 summit in Rio de Janeiro and told him he wanted to build a 'consistent, durable, respectful' relationship with China. In January 2026, Starmer approved Chinese government plans for a new embassy in London. In the same month, he visited China, becoming the first British prime minister to visit China since 2018. Starmer's trip primarily focused on broadening trade ties, bringing a delegation heavy on British banking executives, including HSBC, Barclays, and Standard Chartered, and cultural emissaries representing the arts and sports, as well as manufacturers, including Airbus, AstraZeneca, Brompton Bikes, Jaguar Land Rover, and McLaren Automotive.

A "China spy case" that came to light in 2024 involving Christopher Cash, a former parliamentary researcher, and Christopher Berry collapsed in September 2025 after the Crown Prosecution Service (CPS) dropped charges under the Official Secrets Act. The two were accused of passing information harmful to UK interests between December 2021 and February 2023. Director of Public Prosecutions Stephen Parkinson said the case fell apart because the government failed to provide evidence that China was officially considered a national security threat at the time, as required under a 2025 legal precedent. Conservative leader Kemi Badenoch accused Starmer's government of withholding key evidence to appease China, while the government denied interference and blamed outdated laws and the previous administration's stance on China.

==== Gaza war ====
On the Gaza war, Starmer has supported Israel's right to self-defence and has not blocked all arms sales to Israel. He has also condemned some of Israel's actions, called for a ceasefire, committed humanitarian aid to Gaza, and supported a two-state solution.

In October 2023, shortly after the Hamas attack on Israel, when asked what a proportionate response by Israel would be, Starmer stated that Israel had the "right to defend herself" and "Israel has the right to do everything it can" to return the hostages. When subsequently asked whether a siege involving the cutting off of food and water was appropriate, he responded, "I think Israel does have that right" adding that "everything should be done within international law but I don't want to step away from the sort of core principles that Israel has a right to defend herself and Hamas bears responsibility for these terrorist acts". This sparked significant controversy within his party, and several Labour councillors resigned in protest. Starmer then said that he was referring to the right to self-defence, "I was not saying that Israel had the right to cut off water, food, fuel or medicines".

When he became prime minister, Starmer told Israeli Prime Minister Benjamin Netanyahu of the "urgent need for a ceasefire, the return of hostages and an immediate increase in the volume of humanitarian aid". He also assured Netanyahu that the UK would continue its "vital cooperation to deter malign threats" with Israel.

Under Starmer's premiership, the licences of some British arms sales to Israel were suspended in September 2024 because of a "clear risk" that the weapons could be used to violate international law. Foreign Secretary David Lammy announced the UK Government's suspension of 30 of 350 arms export licences to Israel, affecting equipment such as parts for fighter jets, helicopters and drones. However, in the last three months of 2024, UK arms licenses to Israel totalled £127.6 million, exceeding the £115 million worth of military equipment sent to Israel in the prior four years, 2020 to 2023.

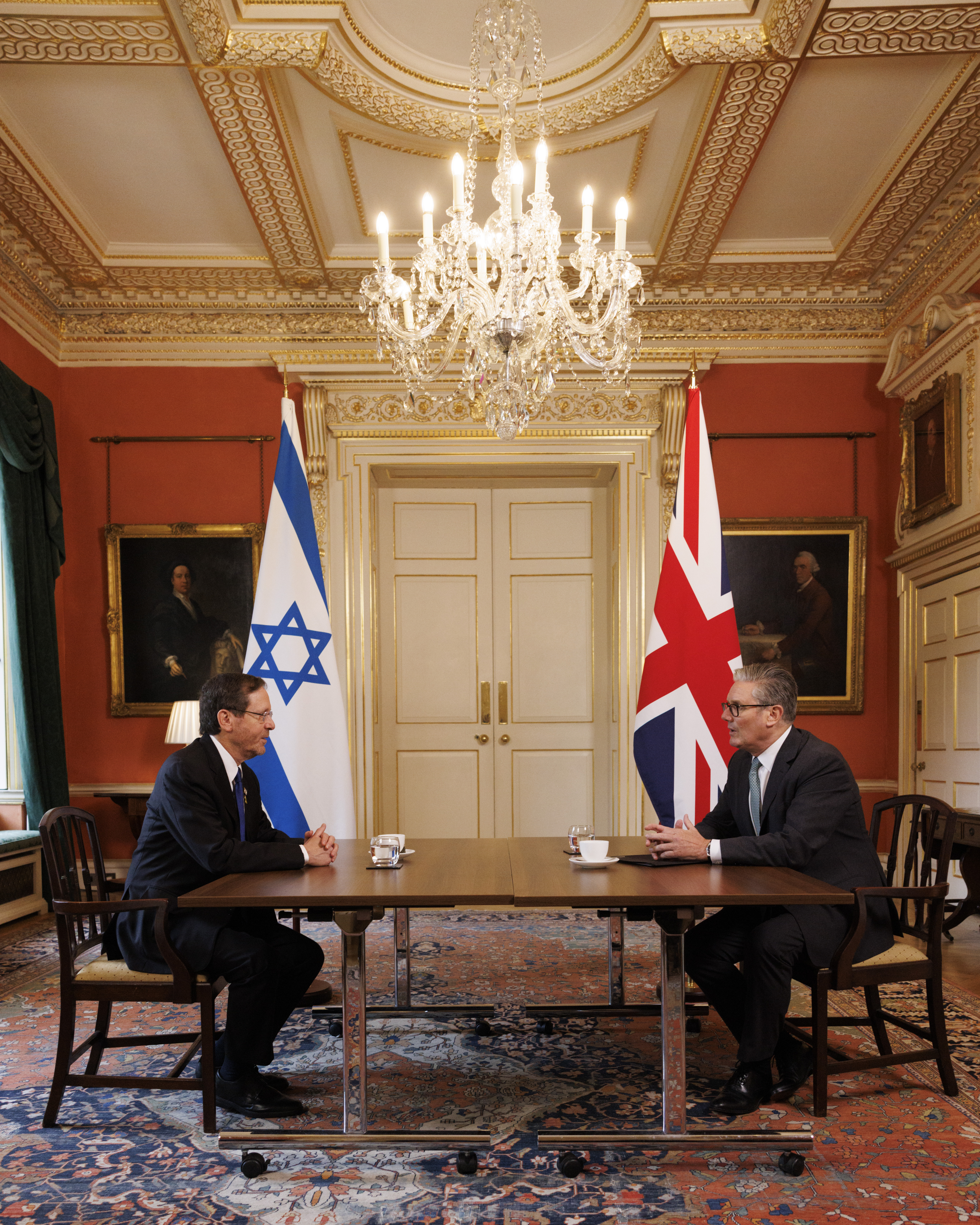
Keir Starmer with Israeli president Isaac Herzog at 10 Downing Street, 10 September 2025

Starmer's government stated in November 2024 that Netanyahu would be arrested if he were to travel to the UK, after the International Criminal Court issued an international arrest warrant for him over alleged war crimes.

In May 2025, Starmer issued a joint statement with Emmanuel Macron and Mark Carney condemning Israel's renewed offensive against Gaza. He called for Israel to immediately stop its military operations and to immediately allow humanitarian aid into Gaza. The statement condemned remarks by members of the Israeli government suggesting the destruction in Gaza would lead to relocation of its population as "abhorrent" and against international law. He said his government would take "concrete actions" if Israel continued its "egregious actions". Netanyahu accused Starmer of siding with Hamas, saying "you're on the wrong side of justice, you're on the wrong side of humanity and you're on the wrong side of history".

On 5 July, the government made the protest group Palestine Action a "proscribed organisation" under the Terrorism Act 2000, following its vandalism of military aircraft at RAF Brize Norton, alleged to support the Israeli military. On 6 August, at a Labour National Executive Committee meeting, Starmer said the group had targeted Jewish-owned businesses, and that the ban was not meant "to stifle debate on Palestine". On 9 August, the Metropolitan Police made 532 arrests, its most in at least a decade, at a protest in Parliament Square. Of these, 522 were for "displaying an item in support of a proscribed organisation", as most protestors carried placards reading "I oppose genocide. I support Palestine Action." Amnesty International and Liberty condemned the proscription as infringing on freedom of speech. Protests against the banning of Palestine Action continued into September 2025, with 890 arrests in one weekend.

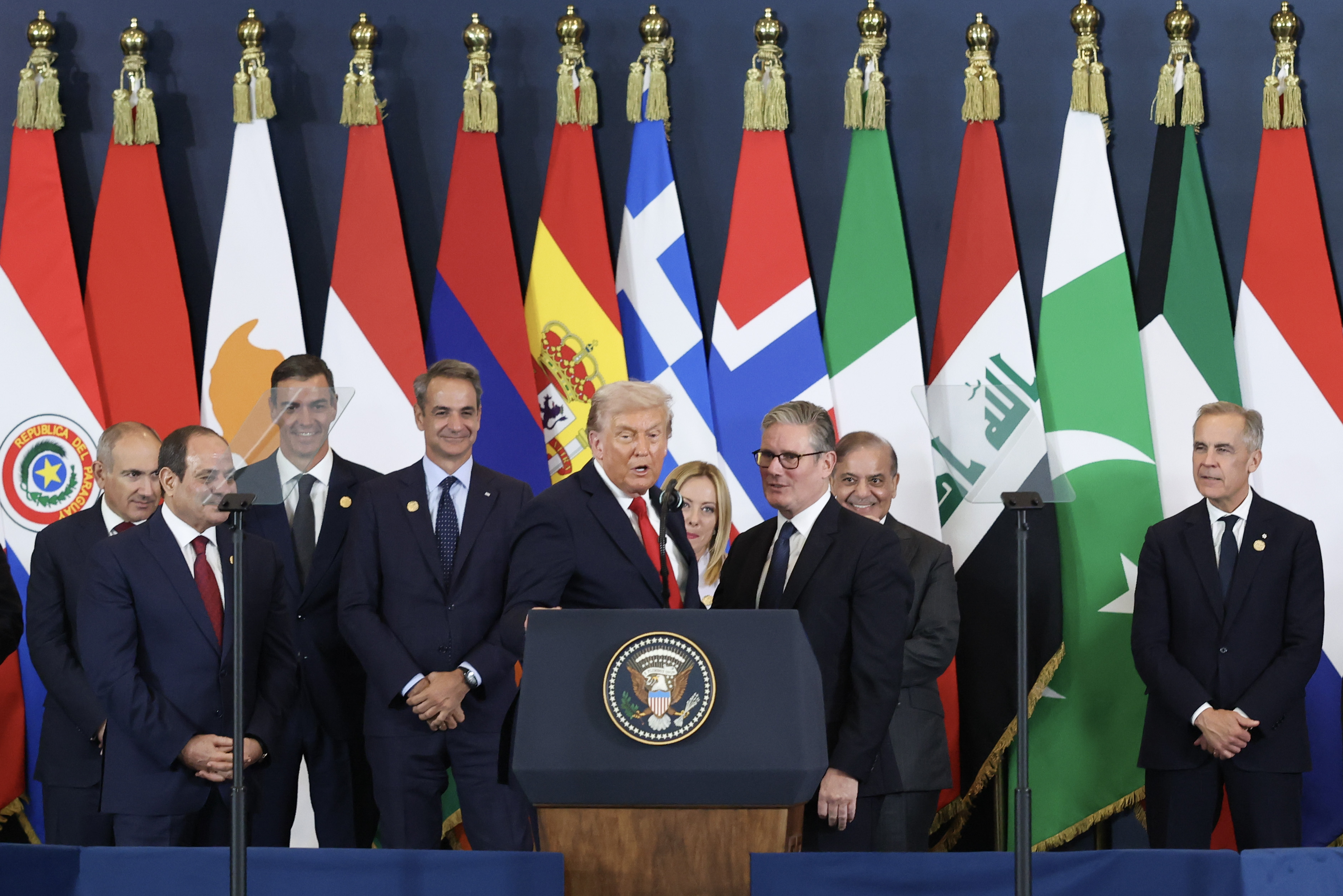
Starmer at the Gaza peace summit in Egypt, 13 October 2025

On 29 July 2025, Starmer announced that the United Kingdom would conditionally recognise the State of Palestine at the September opening of the United Nations General Assembly, contingent on Israel's noncompliance with a ceasefire, the facilitation of humanitarian aid, and a commitment to a two-state solution. The announcement followed a letter signed by 225 MPs, including over half of Labour, calling for immediate recognition. One of its coordinators, Sarah Champion, criticised the conditionality, while Netanyahu and Conservative politicians condemned the move as rewarding Hamas. On 21 September, Starmer announced that the United Kingdom formally recognised Palestine as an independent state.

==== Sudan ====
In late 2025, Starmer's government faced mounting pressure to suspend arms sales to the United Arab Emirates following reports that British-made military equipment was being diverted to the Rapid Support Forces (RSF) in Sudan, which had been accused of committing war crimes and genocide during the ongoing Sudanese civil war.

=== 2026 leadership crisis and resignation ===
Approval ratings of Starmer as prime minister

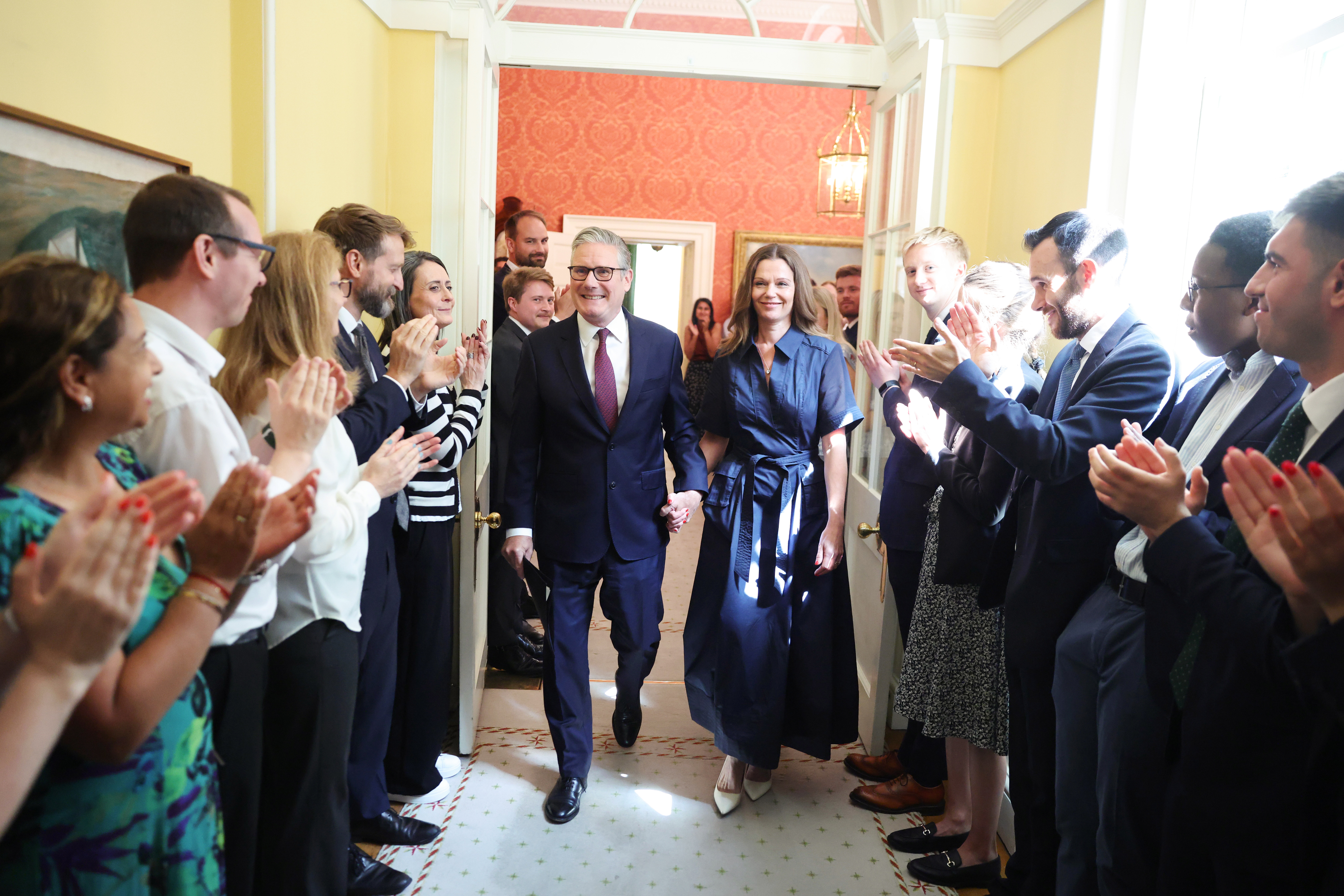
Starmer leaving Number 10 Downing Street on his last day as prime minister.

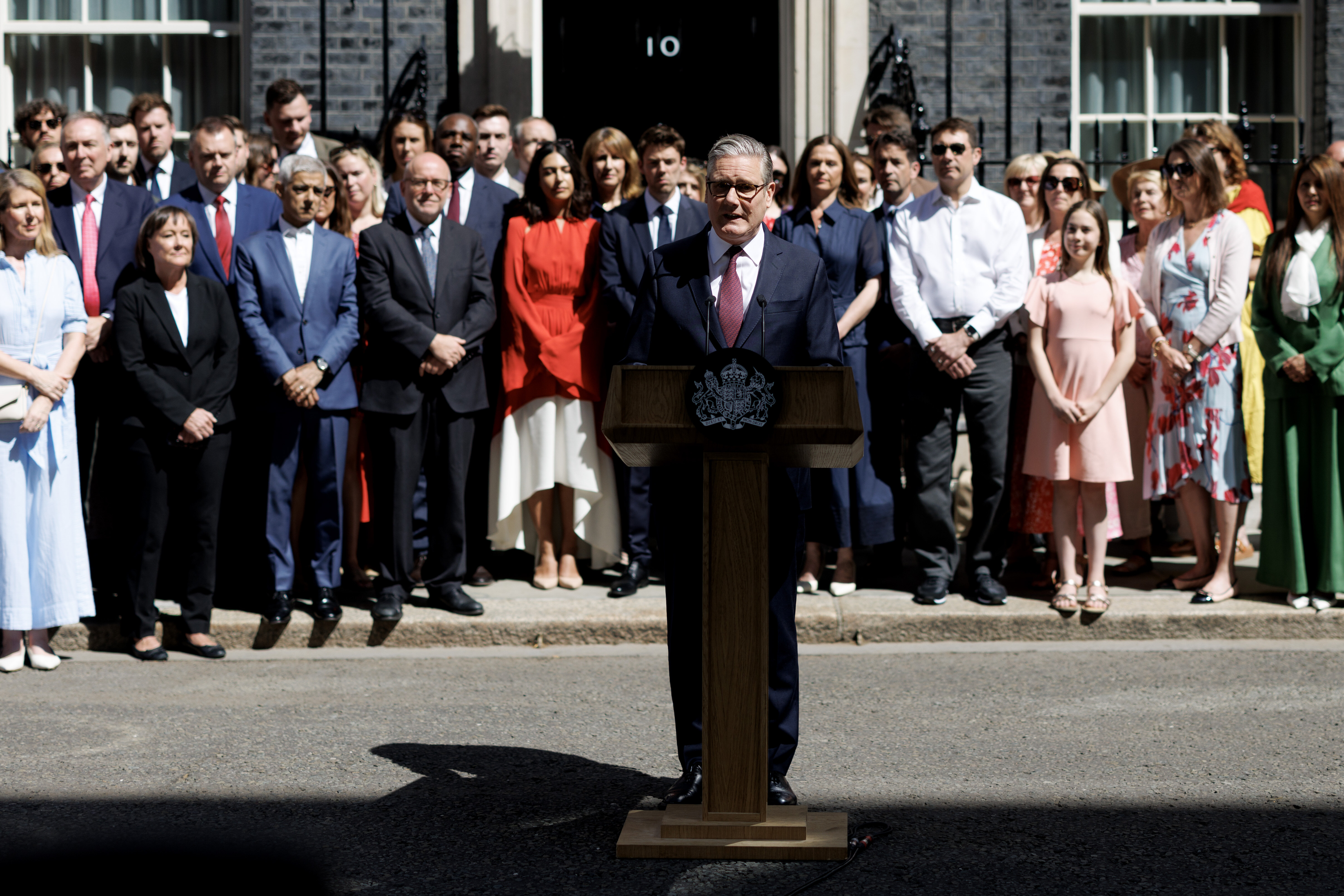
Starmer delivers his resignation speech at 10 Downing Street.

In May 2026, Starmer faced a political crisis following reports of internal divisions within the Labour government and speculation over his future leadership, following on from poor popularity ratings in opinion polls from soon after he became prime minister. The crisis intensified after the resignation of several senior ministers and growing criticism from factions within the Labour Party concerning economic policy, immigration, and electoral strategy. Media outlets reported discussions among Labour MPs regarding potential leadership alternatives, including senior cabinet figures and regional mayors. During a cabinet meeting, Starmer rejected calls to resign and challenged critics within the party to formally contest the leadership if they wished to replace him. Under Labour Party rules, a leadership challenge would require the support of 20 per cent of Labour MPs.

On 22 June 2026, Starmer announced his intention to resign as prime minister and Leader of the Labour Party and asked the party's National Executive Committee to set the timetable for choosing his successor, with nominations due to open on 9 July and the process to conclude before the summer recess. Starmer remained in his positions until the conclusion of the leadership election.

On 20 July 2026 Starmer formally tendered his resignation to Charles III at Buckingham Palace and was officially succeeded by Burnham hours later. Starmer's premiership was the shortest ever by a Labour prime minister and the sixth shortest overall since 1900.
