= List of acts of the 4th session of the 55th Parliament of the United Kingdom =

This is a list of acts of the 4th session of the 55th Parliament of the United Kingdom, which ran from 4 June 2014 until 26 March 2015.

Acts passed since 1963 are cited by calendar year, as opposed to the convention used for earlier acts of citing the regnal year(s) in which the relevant parliamentary session was held. Each act passed in a respective year is given a chapter number (abbreviated "c."), denoted by Arabic numerals in the case of public general acts, lowercase Roman numerals in the case of local acts, or italicised Arabic numerals in the case of personal acts. These run as separate series.

37 acts of Parliament were passed by the 55th Parliament in its 4th session: 36 public general acts and 1 local act.

indicates that an act is available to view at legislation.gov.uk, and indicates the location of the original act in the Parliamentary Archives.

== Public general acts ==
{{legislationuk|act |- | {{|Supply and Appropriation (Main Estimates) Act 2014|public|25|17-07-2014|maintained=y|An Act to authorise the use of resources for the year ending with 31 March 2015; to authorise both the issue of sums out of the Consolidated Fund and the application of income for that year; and to appropriate the supply authorised for that year by this Act and by the Supply and Appropriation (Anticipation and Adjustments) Act 2014.}} |- | {{|Finance Act 2014|public|26|17-07-2014|maintained=y|An Act to grant certain duties, to alter other duties, and to amend the law relating to the National Debt and the Public Revenue, and to make further provision in connection with finance.}} |- | {{|Data Retention and Investigatory Powers Act 2014|public|27|17-07-2014|maintained=y|An Act to make provision, in consequence of a declaration of invalidity made by the Court of Justice of the European Union in relation to Directive 2006/24/EC, about the retention of certain communications data; to amend the grounds for issuing interception warrants, or granting or giving certain authorisations or notices, under Part 1 of the Regulation of Investigatory Powers Act 2000; to make provision about the extra-territorial application of that Part and about the meaning of "telecommunications service" for the purposes of that Act; to make provision about additional reports by the Interception of Communications Commissioner; to make provision about a review of the operation and regulation of investigatory powers; and for connected purposes.}} |- | {{|Childcare Payments Act 2014|public|28|17-12-2014|maintained=y|An Act to make provision for and in connection with the making of payments to persons towards the costs of childcare; and to restrict the availability of an exemption from income tax in respect of the provision for an employee of childcare, or vouchers for obtaining childcare, under a scheme operated by or on behalf of the employer.}} |- | {{|Wales Act 2014|public|29|17-12-2014|maintained=y|An Act to make provision about elections to and membership of the National Assembly for Wales; to make provision about the Welsh Assembly Government; to make provision about the setting by the Assembly of rates of income tax to be paid by Welsh taxpayers and about the devolution of taxation powers to the Assembly; to make related amendments to Part 4A of the Scotland Act 1998; to make provision about borrowing by the Welsh Ministers; to make miscellaneous amendments in the law relating to Wales; and for connected purposes.}} |- | {{|Taxation of Pensions Act 2014|public|30|17-12-2014|maintained=y|An Act to make provision in connection with the taxation of pensions.}} |- | {{|Stamp Duty Land Tax Act 2015|public|1|12-02-2015|maintained=y|An Act to make provision about stamp duty land tax on residential property transactions; and for connected purposes.}} |- | {{|Criminal Justice and Courts Act 2015|public|2|12-02-2015|maintained=y|An Act to make provision about how offenders are dealt with before and after conviction; to create offences involving ill-treatment or wilful neglect by a person providing health care or social care; to create an offence of the corrupt or other improper exercise of police powers and privileges; to make provision about offences committed by disqualified drivers; to create an offence of disclosing private sexual photographs or films with intent to cause distress; to amend the offence of meeting a child following sexual grooming; to amend the offence of possession of extreme pornographic images; to make provision about the proceedings and powers of courts and tribunals; to make provision about judicial review; and for connected purposes.}} |- | {{|Social Action, Responsibility and Heroism Act 2015|public|3|12-02-2015|maintained=y|An Act to make provision as to matters to which a court must have regard in determining a claim in negligence or breach of statutory duty.}} |- | {{|Insurance Act 2015|public|4|12-02-2015|maintained=y|An Act to make new provision about insurance contracts; to amend the Third Parties (Rights against Insurers) Act 2010 in relation to the insured persons to whom that Act applies; and for connected purposes.}} |- | {{|National Insurance Contributions Act 2015|public|5|12-02-2015|maintained=y|An Act to make provision in relation to national insurance contributions; and for connected purposes.}} |- | {{|Counter-Terrorism and Security Act 2015|public|6|12-02-2015|maintained=y|An Act to make provision in relation to terrorism; to make provision about retention of communications data, about information, authority to carry and security in relation to air, sea and rail transport and about reviews by the Special Immigration Appeals Commission against refusals to issue certificates of naturalisation; and for connected purposes.}} |- | {{|Infrastructure Act 2015|public|7|12-02-2015|maintained=y|An Act to make provision for strategic highways companies and the funding of transport services by land; to make provision for the control of invasive non-native species; to make provision about nationally significant infrastructure projects; to make provision about town and country planning; to make provision about the Homes and Communities Agency and Mayoral development corporations; to make provision about the Greater London Authority so far as it exercises functions for the purposes of housing and regeneration; to make provision about Her Majesty's Land Registry and local land charges; to make provision to enable building regulations to provide for off-site carbon abatement measures; to make provision for giving members of communities the right to buy stakes in local renewable electricity generation facilities; to make provision about maximising economic recovery of petroleum in the United Kingdom; to provide for a levy to be charged on holders of certain energy licences; to enable Her Majesty's Revenue and Customs to exercise functions in connection with the Extractive Industries Transparency Initiative; to make provision about onshore petroleum and geothermal energy; to make provision about renewable heat incentives; to make provision about the reimbursement of persons who have paid for electricity connections; to make provision to enable the Public Works Loan Commissioners to be abolished; and for connected purposes.}} |- | {{|Pension Schemes Act 2015|public|8|03-03-2015|maintained=y|An Act to make provision about pension schemes, including provision designed to encourage arrangements that offer people different levels of certainty in retirement or that involve different ways of sharing or pooling risk and provision designed to give people greater flexibility in accessing benefits and to help them make informed decisions about what to do with benefits.}} |- | {{|Serious Crime Act 2015|public|9|03-03-2015|maintained=y|An Act to amend the Proceeds of Crime Act 2002, the Computer Misuse Act 1990, Part 4 of the Policing and Crime Act 2009, section 1 of the Children and Young Persons Act 1933, the Sexual Offences Act 2003, the Street Offences Act 1959, the Female Genital Mutilation Act 2003, the Prohibition of Female Genital Mutilation (Scotland) Act 2005, the Prison Act 1952 and the Terrorism Act 2006; to make provision about involvement in organised crime groups and about serious crime prevention orders; to make provision for the seizure and forfeiture of drug-cutting agents; to make it an offence to possess an item that contains advice or guidance about committing sexual offences against children; to create an offence in relation to controlling or coercive behaviour in intimate or family relationships; to make provision for the prevention or restriction of the use of communication devices by persons detained in custodial institutions; to make provision approving for the purposes of section 8 of the European Union Act 2011 certain draft decisions under Article 352 of the Treaty on the Functioning of the European Union relating to serious crime; to make provision about codes of practice that relate to the exercise and performance, in connection with the prevention or detection of serious crime, of powers and duties in relation to communications; and for connected purposes.}} |- | {{|Supply and Appropriation (Anticipation and Adjustments) Act 2015|public|10|26-03-2015|maintained=y|An Act to authorise the use of resources for the years ending with 31 March 2014, 31 March 2015 and 31 March 2016; to authorise the issue of sums out of the Consolidated Fund for the years ending with 31 March 2015 and 31 March 2016; and to appropriate the supply authorised by this Act for the years ending with 31 March 2014 and 31 March 2015.}} |- | {{|Finance Act 2015|public|11|26-03-2015|maintained=y|An Act to grant certain duties, to alter other duties, and to amend the law relating to the National Debt and the Public Revenue, and to make further provision in connection with finance.}} |- | {{|International Development (Official Development Assistance Target) Act 2015|public|12|26-03-2015|maintained=y|An Act to make provision about the meeting by the United Kingdom of the target for official development assistance (ODA) to constitute 0.7 per cent of gross national income; to make provision for independent verification that ODA is spent efficiently and effectively; and for connected purposes.}} |- | {{|Mutuals' Deferred Shares Act 2015|public|13|26-03-2015|maintained=y|An Act to enable the law relating to societies registered and incorporated under the Friendly Societies Act 1992 and certain mutual insurers to be amended to permit or facilitate the issue of deferred shares; and to restrict the voting rights of members who hold such shares.}} |- | {{|House of Lords (Expulsion and Suspension) Act 2015|public|14|26-03-2015|maintained=y|An Act to make provision empowering the House of Lords to expel or suspend members.}} |- | {{|Consumer Rights Act 2015|public|15|26-03-2015|maintained=y|An Act to amend the law relating to the rights of consumers and protection of their interests; to make provision about investigatory powers for enforcing the regulation of traders; to make provision about private actions in competition law and the Competition Appeal Tribunal; and for connected purposes.}} |- | {{|Specialist Printing Equipment and Materials (Offences) Act 2015|public|16|26-03-2015|maintained=y|An Act to make provision for an offence in respect of supplies of specialist printing equipment and related materials; and for connected purposes.}} |- | {{|Self-build and Custom Housebuilding Act 2015|public|17|26-03-2015|maintained=y|An Act to place a duty on certain public authorities to keep a register of individuals and associations of individuals who wish to acquire serviced plots of land to bring forward self-build and custom housebuilding projects and to place a duty on certain public authorities to have regard to those registers in carrying out planning and other functions.}} |- | {{|Lords Spiritual (Women) Act 2015|public|18|26-03-2015|maintained=y|An Act to make time-limited provision for vacancies among the Lords Spiritual to be filled by bishops who are women.}} |- | {{|Armed Forces (Service Complaints and Financial Assistance) Act 2015|public|19|26-03-2015|maintained=y|An Act to make provision about service complaints; about financial assistance for the armed forces community; and for connected purposes.}} |- | {{|Deregulation Act 2015|public|20|26-03-2015|maintained=y|An Act to make provision for the reduction of burdens resulting from legislation for businesses or other organisations or for individuals; make provision for the repeal of legislation which no longer has practical use; make provision about the exercise of regulatory functions; and for connected purposes.}} |- | {{|Corporation Tax (Northern Ireland) Act 2015|public|21|26-03-2015|maintained=y|An Act to make provision for and in connection with the creation of a Northern Ireland rate of corporation tax.}} |- | {{|Local Government (Review of Decisions) Act 2015|public|22|26-03-2015|maintained=y|An Act to make provision about the procedure for conducting investigations under Part 3 of the Local Government Act 1974; and to make provision for cases where an authority to which that Part applies takes a decision that affects the holding of an event for a reason relating to health or safety.}} |- | {{|Control of Horses Act 2015|public|23|26-03-2015|maintained=y|An Act to make provision for the taking of action in relation to horses which are on land in England without lawful authority; and for connected purposes.}} |- | {{|House of Commons Commission Act 2015|public|24|26-03-2015|maintained=y|An Act to amend the House of Commons (Administration) Act 1978 so as to make provision about the membership of the House of Commons Commission, so as to confer a new strategic function on the Commission, and so as to make provision about the exercise of functions on behalf of the Commission or its members.}} |- | {{|Recall of MPs Act 2015|public|25|26-03-2015|maintained=y|An Act to make provision about the recall of members of the House of Commons; and for connected purposes.}} |- | {{|Small Business, Enterprise and Employment Act 2015|public|26|26-03-2015|maintained=y|An Act to make provision about improved access to finance for businesses and individuals; to make provision about regulatory provisions relating to business and certain voluntary and community bodies; to make provision about the exercise of procurement functions by certain public authorities; to make provision for the creation of a Pubs Code and Adjudicator for the regulation of dealings by pub-owning businesses with their tied pub tenants; to make provision about the regulation of the provision of childcare; to make provision about information relating to the evaluation of education; to make provision about the regulation of companies; to make provision about company filing requirements; to make provision about the disqualification from appointments relating to companies; to make provision about insolvency; to make provision about the law relating to employment; and for connected purposes.}} |- | {{|Local Government (Religious etc. Observances) Act 2015|public|27|26-03-2015|maintained=y|An Act to make provision about the inclusion at local authority meetings of observances that are, and about powers of local authorities in relation to events that to any extent are, religious or related to a religious or philosophical belief.}} |- | {{|Health and Social Care (Safety and Quality) Act 2015|public|28|26-03-2015|maintained=y|An Act to make provision about the safety of health and social care services in England; to make provision about the integration of information relating to users of health and social care services in England; to make provision about the sharing of information relating to an individual for the purposes of providing that individual with health or social care services in England; to make provision about the objectives of the regulatory bodies for health and social care professions and the Professional Standards Authority for Health and Social Care; to make provision about the disposal of cases concerning a person's fitness to practise a health or social care profession; and for connected purposes.}} |- | {{|Health Service Commissioner for England (Complaint Handling) Act 2015|public|29|26-03-2015|maintained=y|An Act to make provision about the handling of complaints by the Health Service Commissioner for England; to require the Commissioner to notify a complainant of the reason for the delay if the investigation of the complaint is not concluded within a 12 month period; to require the Commissioner to lay before Parliament an annual report giving details of how long investigations of complaints have taken to be concluded and progress towards meeting a target of concluding investigations within a 12 month period; and for connected purposes.}} |- | {{|Modern Slavery Act 2015|public|30|26-03-2015|maintained=y|An Act to make provision about slavery, servitude and forced or compulsory labour and about human trafficking, including provision for the protection of victims; to make provision for an Independent Anti-Slavery Commissioner; and for connected purposes.}} }}

== Local act ==
{{legislationuk|act |- | {{|Buckinghamshire County Council (Filming on Highways) Act 2014|local|2|17-12-2014|maintained=y|archived=n|An Act to confer powers on Buckinghamshire County Council in relation to filming on highways; and for related purposes.}} }}
