= Charters School =

Location
- Charters Road; Sunningdale; Ascot, Berkshire, SL5 9QY; England; 51.39241°N 0.65158°W

Information
- Type: Academy
- Motto: Unity, Respect, Excellence
- Established: 23 April 1958
- Department for Education URN: 138823 Tables
- Ofsted: Reports
- Head teacher: John Fletcher
- Gender: Coeducational
- Age: 11 to 18
- Houses: Bulldogs; Eagles; Panthers
- Colours: Green; Blue; Red
- Website: www.chartersschool.org.uk

Charters School is a secondary school and sixth form with academy status located in Sunningdale, Berkshire.

In December 2006 and December 2009 it was graded 1 outstanding by OFSTED.

== History ==
Charters School opened its doors on 23 April 1958 to just under 400 students. A service of dedication was held in the school hall on 17 December 1958 and the students were given an extra half-day's holiday to mark the occasion.

Queen Elizabeth made an informal visit to Charters School on 4 April 1962. During her visit, the Queen saw diverse lessons, from recorder playing to hammer forging, from a comptometer-operating class to woodwork and metalwork. A boys’ handicraft class was also on the agenda.

Timeline

By 1965 the population of Bracknell, Windsor and Ascot was rapidly increasing. This spurred a decision to develop Charters into an eight form entry comprehensive school taking all children from the area from the age of 11-18. By 1969, plans were under way for proposed extensions to cope with the increase in school numbers.

1972 saw extensive alterations to the school with the addition of 10 science laboratories, a games hall, drama hall and arts, crafts and home economics centres being built. By 1977, the school had become over-crowded to the extent that nine classes were regularly being taught in corridors.

In 1981 a decision was made to make Charters School a centre for physically disabled students. The school undertook a series of modifications, which included two lifts, a medical room, and home base for students as well as access ramps around the school. The school opened its doors to its first physically disabled students in September 1983.

In 1985 the sports facilities were expanded to make Charters School the focus of the area's recreational, social and community activities. The school continued to grow and in September 1992 a new purpose-built Library and Resource Centre was opened. More modular classrooms were also added.

To date the school expanded from 400 students to have capacity for over 1740, most of which are filled.

== Controversy ==
The school has faced a number of financial challenges over the years, as seen across many other schools in the United Kingdom.

In 2017 the school announced that due to ongoing budget pressures, they would employ 10 less teachers, opting instead of making staff redundant, to not replace any that left.

In 2019, this had become so severe they had to close the school early on a Friday to cut back on teaching costs, finishing an extra 90 minutes early. The school said in a statement

"Charters, have since 2010, found themselves under significant financial pressure due to a combination of reduced per pupil funding and rising costs. We recognise that changes of this sort can raise concerns. Please be assured that our objective is to be able to continue to provide excellent educational opportunities."

Not soon after the Royal Borough of Windsor and Maidenhead said it would investigate and support Charters. Whilst their exact actions are unknown, the school has since reverted on this decision.

== Notable former pupils ==
- Duncan Capps, senior British Army officer
- Chesney Hawkes, singer, songwriter and occasional actor
- Keith Hawkins, poker player
- Sophie Christiansen, Paralympic equestrian gold medalist
- Kerry Ingram, actress, performer
- Ross Fisher, professional golfer
- Robert Gier, professional footballer
