= Eleanor Lyons =

British public official

Independent Anti-Slavery Commissioner
- Incumbent
- Assumed office December 2023

Eleanor Lyons is a British public official who has served as the United Kingdom’s Independent Anti-Slavery Commissioner (IASC) since December 2023.

== Career before becoming Commissioner ==
Prior to her appointment as Commissioner, Lyons was Deputy Children’s Commissioner for England, advocating and championing for the rights of all children in England, and particularly those who were vulnerable, in care, or in contact with social services. She previously worked in political consultancy as a Director at Portland Communications (November 2019–July 2020). Between November 2017 and August 2019 she served as a Special Adviser.

== Independent Anti-Slavery Commissioner ==
=== Appointment and reaction ===
Lyons’ appointment drew criticism from Labour MP Jess Phillips, who described her as a “Conservative patsy who will do whatever they want”, as the post had previously been held by “experts and senior police officers.” Phillips said that the Government "...could possibly have anyone who knows anything about slavery because no one who knew anything about it would tell the Government they were doing a good job. They are scared and inexperienced and are happy to fail British children being traffiked in ever higher numbers and women being brought here repeatedly raped".

=== Strategic Plan 2024–2026 ===
Lyons’ Strategic Plan (2024–2026) covers her full three-year term as Commissioner. The plan was developed following wide consultation with survivors, civil society, and devolved governments. The plan sets out three core objectives:

1. Prevention – tackling root causes of exploitation and reducing vulnerabilities.
2. Protection – improving victim identification, reforming the National Referral Mechanism (NRM), and ensuring better care and advocacy.
3. Prosecution – enhancing the criminal justice response and supporting evidence-led prosecutions.

These objectives are underpinned by two cross-cutting themes: integrating lived experience (including a proposed Survivors Advisory Council) and improving knowledge and research to strengthen the evidence base.

=== Research and reports ===
As Commissioner, Lyons has overseen a programme of research reports and policy briefs:

- Preventing Labour Exploitation: Tackling Modern Slavery is Everyone’s Business (Policy Brief, 2024).
- Child Trafficking in the UK 2024: A Snapshot (2024).
- Child Exploitation: prevention, protection and support for children and young people (Policy Brief, 2024).
- Overlapping Threats to Freedom: Understanding Vulnerability to Modern Slavery (Insight Briefing, 2025).
- Refusal to consent: factors influencing the uptake of modern slavery support under the National Referral Mechanism (2025).
- Enhancing modern slavery prevention within the homelessness sector in the UK (2025).
- Policing response to modern slavery: how has it changed in the last 10 years? (2025).
- More than words: how definitions impact on the UK’s response to child trafficking and exploitation (2025).
- Integrating Modern Slavery into the Violence Against Women and Girls Strategy 2025–2035 (Policy Brief, 2025).
- Modern Slavery Prevalence Estimation in the UK: A Scoping Review (2025).

She has also published opinion pieces on survivor voice and supply chain legislation.

=== Strategic initiatives ===
Lyons has launched several initiatives aligned to her plan, including work on forced labour regulations, adult services websites regulation, and emerging threats.

=== Tenure and public commentary ===
Lyons has given evidence to multiple parliamentary committees on modern slavery and exploitation. She has twice appeared in front of the Home Affairs Select Committee (2024, 2025)

and in front of the House of Lords Committee on Modern Slavery Act 2015 Committee. Alongside this she has appeared in front of the Business and Trade Select Committee, and the Joint Committee on Human Rights. In these she called for the establishment of a Single Enforcement Body and has called for a new cross-government modern slavery strategy and mandatory human rights due diligence legislation.

She has been an active media commentator, including appearances on the Today Programme, Sky News, ITN News and other outlets. In February 2024, The Independent reported modern slavery was “no longer the priority” for the Home Office and that the IASC budget would be cut annually In the Prison Service Journal she stressed the importance of amplifying survivors’ voices: “Survivors have told us what they need—now it’s time to deliver.”; Lyons said her budget would be reduced by 5% each year she was in post and that she had no permanent staff in 2024, requiring special permission to recruit outside the Home Office.

In the Prison Service Journal she stressed the importance of amplifying survivors’ voices: 'Survivors have told us what they need—now it’s time to deliver.'

Lyons has also stressed the need for modern slavery to be seen as a crime against individuals and ‘not be conflated with immigration offences.’

She has also criticised flaws in a visa route that enabled “horrific” exploitation, describing the victim support system as “deeply broken,” and said record NRM referrals showed the “shocking scale” of exploitation in the UK.

=== Review of adult services websites ===
In August 2025, Lyons announced a formal review into adult services websites (ASWs), calling them a “hotbed for trafficking” and would have a "full call for evidence on why these websites are so damaging. At a bare minimum, they should be far more heavily regulated".

== Selected quotes ==
- “Modern slavery and human trafficking are abhorrent crimes… Our response must be focused on prosecuting… preventing… and protecting victims.” (GOV.UK, 2023).
- “I am committed to a victim-centric approach… survivors’ experiences inform my work to effect meaningful change.” (GOV.UK, 2023).
- “I think it’s fair to say now that the focus of the Home Office is on tackling illegal migration and small boats, and that modern slavery and human trafficking is no longer the priority that it was.” (The Independent, February 2024).
- “Survivors have told us what they need—now it’s time to deliver.” (Prison Service Journal, April 2024).
- “Adult service websites … are a hotbed for trafficking.” (The Guardian, August 2025).
- “Something is deeply broken… [the NRM is] mistrusted, mishandled, and in urgent need of reform.” (The Guardian, May 2025).
