= Sara Thornton (police officer) =

British Chief Constable (born 1962)

Dame Sara Thornton DBE QPM
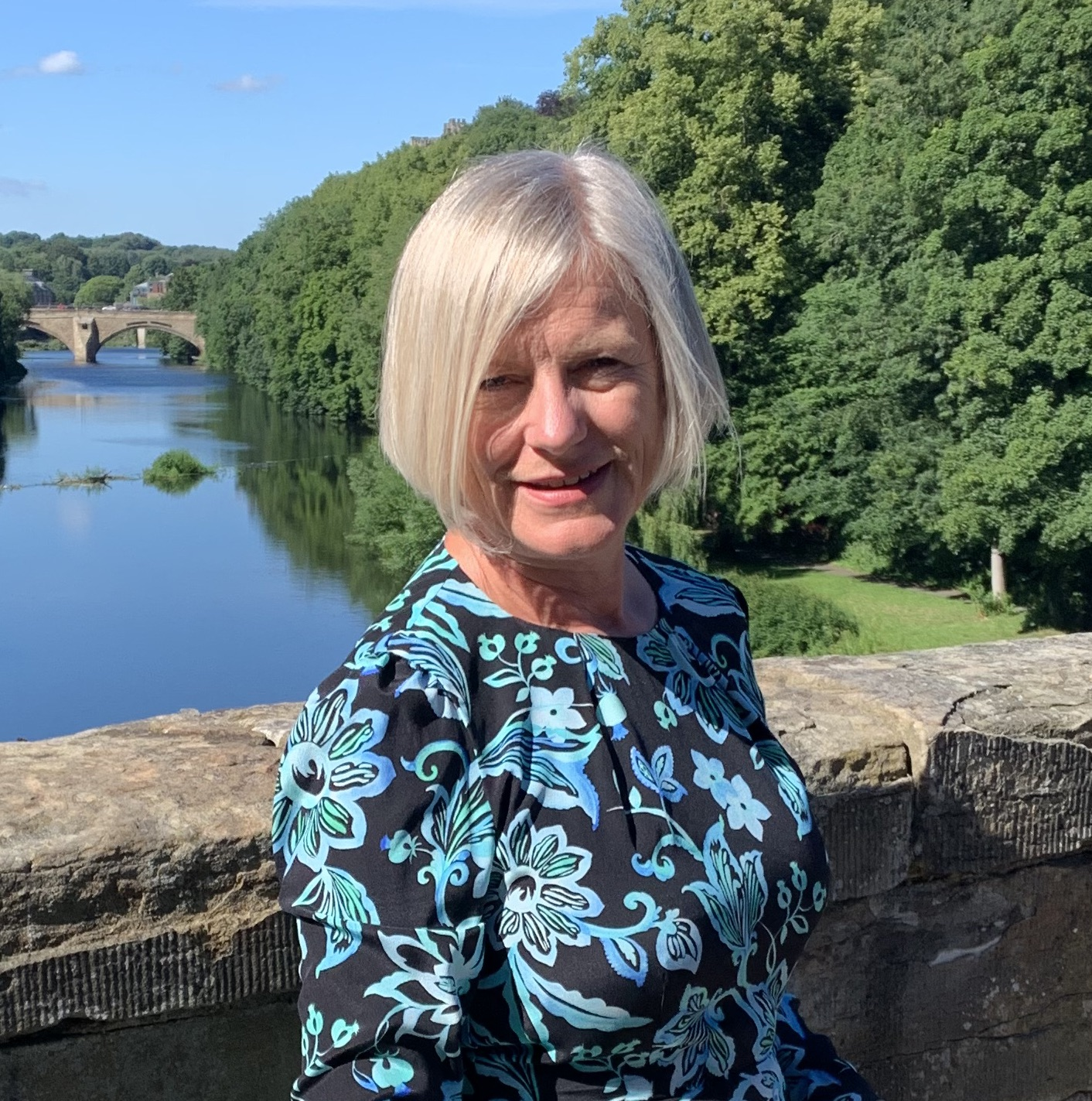

Independent Anti-Slavery Commissioner
- In office May 2019 – April 2022
- Preceded by: Kevin Hyland

Chair of the National Police Chiefs' Council
- In office April 2015 – May 2019
- Preceded by: Sir Hugh Orde (as Chair of the ACPO)
- Succeeded by: Martin Hewitt, QPM

Chief Constable of Thames Valley Police
- In office 2007–2015
- Preceded by: Peter Neyroud
- Succeeded by: Francis Habgood

Personal details
- Born: 27 December 1962 (age 63) Poole, Dorset, England
- Citizenship: United Kingdom
- Education: Durham University; Wolfson College, Cambridge
- Awards: Queen's Police Medal (2006); Commander of the Order of the British Empire (2011); Dame Commander of the Order of the British Empire (2019)

Dame Sara Joanne Thornton, DBE, QPM (born 27 December 1962) is a retired British police officer who was the UK's Independent Anti-Slavery Commissioner from May 2019 until April 2022. She was appointed by the Home Secretary at the time, Sajid Javid, in succession to Kevin Hyland who left the post in May 2018.

She was the first Chair of the National Police Chiefs' Council (NPCC) and the former Chief Constable of Thames Valley Police and Vice-President of the Association of Chief Police Officers (ACPO). She was the second consecutive head of the Thames Valley Police to move onto leadership of a national policing body; at Thames Valley she replaced former Chief Constable Peter Neyroud who, in January 2007, moved to the role of Chief executive of the National Policing Improvement Agency. As of 2026, she is Professor of Practice in modern slavery policy at the University of Nottingham's Rights Lab.

== Early life and education ==
Thornton was born on 27 December 1962 in Poole, Dorset. She attended the University of Durham and gained a BA degree in philosophy and politics. Thornton also has a Diploma in Applied Criminology from the Cambridge Institute of Criminology.

== Police career ==
Thornton's policing career began with the Metropolitan Police in 1986. For the next 14 years she alternated between operational postings in West London and strategic roles within New Scotland Yard. She joined Thames Valley Police as the Assistant Chief Constable for Specialist Operations in November 2000 and was appointed Deputy Chief Constable in August 2003, where her responsibilities included performance and developing the strategic direction for the Force. She played a pivotal role in implementing Neighbourhood Policing across the Thames Valley.

In 2007, Thornton became Chief Constable of Thames Valley Police.

On 1 December 2014, it was announced that Thornton would leave Thames Valley Police to become the Chair of the National Police Chiefs' Council, (NPCC) effectively taking over from Sir Hugh Orde. The NPCC replaced the Association of Chief Police Officers (ACPO) in April 2015. Thornton also took over from Sir Hugh Orde as Patron of the Police Roll of Honour Trust.

In 2015, the Oxfordshire Safeguarding Children Board published a critical serious case review report into child sexual exploitation in Oxfordshire, following the jailing in 2013 of seven men for abusing six girls in Oxford between 2004 and 2012. In response to the report, Thornton repeated an apology to victims and their families saying "We are ashamed of the shortcomings identified in this report and we are determined to do all we can to ensure that nothing like this ever happens again."

In March 2019, following a spate of knife murders involving young people around the UK, Thornton called for the situation to be treated as a national emergency.

== Views ==
Thornton holds the judgment that the police force is under-resourced and fears dealing with terrorism is taking resources away from general policing. Thornton wrote, "Every time there's a terror attack, we mobilise specialist officers and staff to respond, but the majority of the officers and staff responding come from mainstream policing. This puts extra strain on an already-stretched service." Thornton maintains police officer numbers are at 1985 levels with crime figures up 10% in the year to 2017 and maintains this leads to further pressure. Thornton also said, "In response to this significant threat, the government is increasing the money it spends on terrorism from £11.7bn to £15.1bn but only about £700m per annum is spent on policing. And the allocation of this budget for policing is set to be cut by 7.2% in the next three years. When the volume and nature of a threat is growing alarmingly, that is a real concern." She has also expressed the view that the law against race discrimination in hiring practices should be revoked thus making it legal for institutions to exercise positive race discrimination when hiring, with a view to increasing the percentage of BAME police officers in England and Wales. She stated that “[race discrimination] is unlawful at the moment. If you want to do something to give a shock to the system and say we can’t wait to 2052, I think we need to do something different."

== Independent Anti-Slavery Commissioner ==
Thornton was appointed the UK's Independent Anti-Slavery Commissioner in February 2019 and took up the role on 1 May 2019. Part 4 of the Modern Slavery Act 2015 created the role of the Independent Anti-Slavery Commissioner. The Commissioner has a UK-wide remit to encourage good practice in the prevention, detection, investigation and prosecution of modern slavery offences and the identification of victims.

In March 2020, Thornton said that the local authorities and not Home Office should make decisions on child trafficking cases. The commissioner argued that councils are in much better position and can easily provide child support.

== Later life ==
Thornton was appointed Honorary Air Commodore of No. 3 Royal Air Force (Reserves) Police Squadron Royal Auxiliary Air Force, re-appointed for another three years 2024–2026, and again for another year until early 2027.

== Honours ==

Ribbon	Description	Notes
	Order of the British Empire (DBE)	Dame Commander (DBE); 2019 Queen's Birthday Honours List; Commander (CBE); 2011 New Years Honours List; Civil Division
	Queen's Police Medal (QPM)	June 2006
	Queen Elizabeth II Golden Jubilee Medal	2002; UK Version of this Medal
	Queen Elizabeth II Diamond Jubilee Medal	2012; UK Version of this Medal
	Police Long Service and Good Conduct Medal	

In June 2006 she was awarded the Queen's Police Medal (QPM). She was appointed Commander of the Order of the British Empire (CBE) in the 2011 New Year Honours for services to the police and Dame Commander of the Order of the British Empire (DBE) in the 2019 Birthday Honours for services to policing.

In February 2013 she was assessed as the 18th most powerful woman in Britain by Woman's Hour on BBC Radio 4.

Police appointments
Preceded by Peter Neyroud	Chief Constable of Thames Valley Police; 2007–2015	Succeeded by Francis Habgood
Preceded by Sir Hugh Orde as President of the ACPO	Chair of the National Police Chiefs' Council; 2015–2019	Succeeded by Martin Hewitt
