= Duncan Capps =

Retired British Army general (born 1966)

Major General Duncan Capps CBE
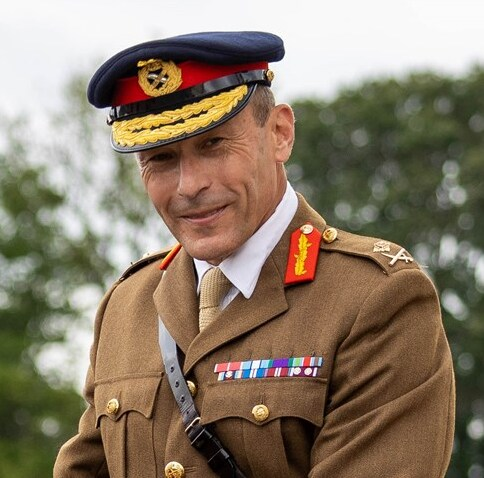
- Capps in 2021

Acting Border Security Commander
- Incumbent
- Assumed office 1 April 2026
- Appointed by: Shabana Mahmood
- Monarch: Charles III
- Preceded by: Martin Hewitt

Personal details
- Born: 21 December 1966 (age 59) Slough, Buckinghamshire, England
- Awards: Commander of the Order of the British Empire

Military service
- Allegiance: United Kingdom
- Branch/service: British Army
- Years of service: 1986–2022
- Rank: Major General
- Unit: Royal Corps of Transport
- Commands: 104th Logistic Support Brigade; Royal Military Academy Sandhurst (2020–2022)
- Battles/wars: War in Afghanistan

Major General Duncan Francis Capps CBE (born 21 December 1966) is a former British Army officer. He served as Commandant of the Royal Military Academy Sandhurst from 2020 to 2022.

== Early life and education ==
Capps was born on 21 December 1966 in Slough, Buckinghamshire, England. He was educated at Charters School, a comprehensive school in Sunningdale, Berkshire. He graduated from Cranfield University with a Master of Arts (MA) degree in 1999.

== Military career ==
Capps was commissioned into the Royal Corps of Transport on 13 December 1986. He was commanding officer of 7 Regiment Royal Logistic Corps from 2006 to 2008.

He became deputy chief of staff, Headquarters 1st (United Kingdom) Armoured Division in December 2008, commander 104th Logistic Support Brigade in August 2011 and commander, Joint Force Support in Afghanistan in December 2012. He went on to be assistant chief of staff (logistics) at Permanent Joint Headquarters in November 2013, Head of Defence Supply Chain Operations and Movements at Defence Equipment and Support in February 2016 and General Officer Commanding Regional Command in June 2017. Capps became commandant of the Royal Military Academy Sandhurst on 27 March 2020, and served as such until August 2022. He retired from the army in December 2022.

Capps was appointed a Commander of the Order of the British Empire (CBE) on 21 March 2014.

== Later career ==
In December 2022, he was appointed director of the "Small Boats Operational Command", which replaced the "Clandestine Channel Threat Command" in the Home Office. In April 2026, he was appointed on an interim basis as the Border Security Commander.

Military offices
| Preceded by Richard Stanford | GOC Regional Command; 2017-2020 | Succeeded by David Eastman |
| Preceded by Paul Nanson | Commandant of the Royal Military Academy Sandhurst; 2020–2022 | Succeeded by Zachary Stenning |
