= Martin Hewitt (police officer) =

Senior British police officer

Martin Hewitt CBE QPM
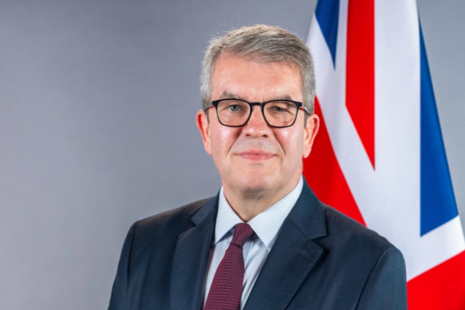
- Hewitt in 2024

Border Security Commander
- In office 15 September 2024 – 31 March 2026
- Appointed by: Yvette Cooper
- Monarch: Charles III
- Preceded by: Office established
- Succeeded by: Duncan Capps (acting)

Chairman of the National Police Chiefs' Council
- In office March 2019 – March 2023
- Preceded by: Sara Thornton
- Succeeded by: Gavin Stephens

Personal details
- Born: 23 March 1966 (age 60)
- Education: Salesian College, Battersea
- Alma mater: University of Leicester

Military service
- Allegiance: United Kingdom
- Branch/service: British Army
- Years of service: 1987–1993
- Rank: Lieutenant
- Unit: Royal Artillery

Martin James Hewitt (born 23 March 1966) is a former British senior police officer who served as the Border Security Commander from September 2024 to March 2026. A former soldier and senior officer in the Metropolitan Police, Hewitt previously served as chair of the National Police Chiefs' Council from May 2019 to March 2023.

== Early life and education ==
Hewitt was born on 23 March 1966 in London, England. He was educated at the Salesian College, Battersea, an all-boys Catholic grammar school in London. He would later attend the University of Leicester, completing a postgraduate diploma in criminal justice studies in 2000.

Hewitt's first career was in the military, serving in the British Army for seven years. Having attended the Royal Military Academy Sandhurst, he was commissioned into the Royal Artillery as a second lieutenant on 11 April 1987. He was promoted to lieutenant on 11 April 1989. He was transferred to the reserve of officers on 31 January 1993, thereby ending his active service.

== Police career ==
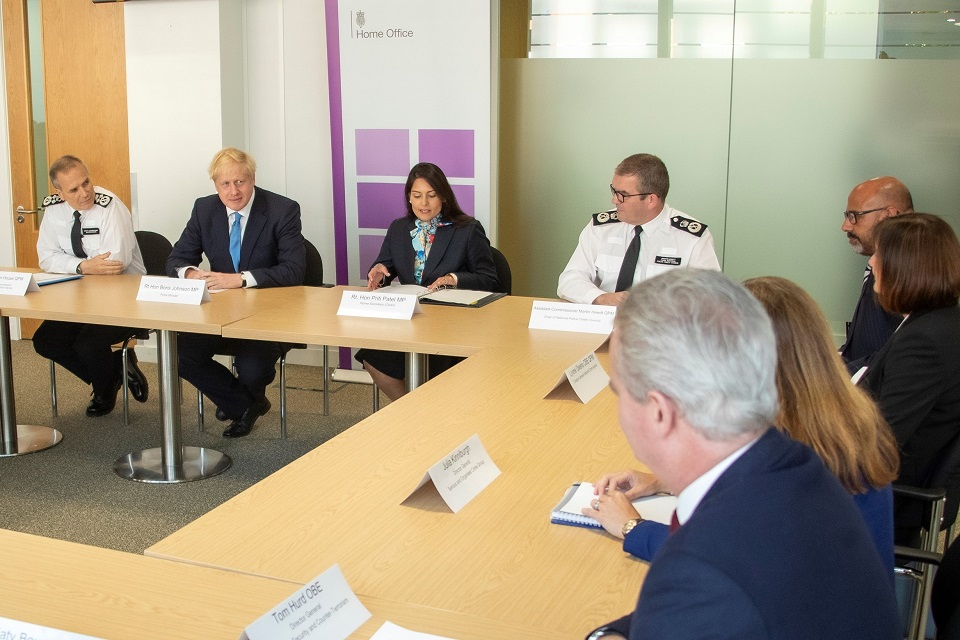
Hewitt (4th from left) attending the National Policing Board in 2019

After leaving the army, Hewitt joined Kent Police in 1993, and served in uniform and as a detective. In 2005, he transferred to the Metropolitan Police as a detective chief superintendent. In the 2014 Queen's Birthday Honours, he was awarded the Queen's Police Medal (QPM) for his service as a deputy assistant commissioner in the Met.

He was the Metropolitan Police's Assistant Commissioner (Professionalism) until April 2016, when he became Assistant Commissioner (Territorial Policing). That role was renamed Assistant Commissioner Frontline Policing in 2018, and he held it until the end of that year.

He had been deputy chair of the National Police Chiefs' Council (NPCC) since 2015. He took up his role as chair of the NPCC in April 2019, succeeding Sara Thornton, and with Mark Simmons succeeding him as Assistant Commissioner Frontline Policing. He has also led national-level police responses to kidnap and adult sexual offences. His first interview, in January 2020, as head of the NPCC lays out his approach. During the COVID-19 pandemic, he spoke as part of the government's team for daily briefings.

Hewitt was appointed Commander of the Order of the British Empire (CBE) in the 2024 New Year Honours for services to policing.

== Border Security Commander ==
On 15 September 2024, Hewitt was appointed as the UK's first Border Security Commander. In March 2026, it was announced that he would be standing down at the end of the month, after only 18 months in the role.

== Honours ==
Ribbon	Description	Notes
	Commander of the Order of the British Empire (CBE)	2024
	Queen's Police Medal (QPM)	2014
	General Service Medal	With "Northern Ireland" clasp
	UNFICYP	90 days' service with peacekeeping mission in Cyprus
	Queen Elizabeth II Golden Jubilee Medal	2002; UK version
	Queen Elizabeth II Diamond Jubilee Medal	2012; UK version
	Queen Elizabeth II Platinum Jubilee Medal	2022; UK version
	Police Long Service and Good Conduct Medal	

Police appointments
Preceded by Sara Thornton	Chair of the National Police Chiefs' Council; 2019–2023	Succeeded by Gavin Stevens
