= Border Security Command =

Agency overview
- Formed: 7 July 2024; 2 years ago

Jurisdictional structure
- National agency: United Kingdom
- Operations jurisdiction: United Kingdom
- Jurisdiction of the Border Security Command

Operational structure
- Elected officer responsible: Shabana Mahmood, Home Secretary
- Agency executive: Duncan Capps, Border Security Commander
- Child agencies: Immigration Enforcement; National Crime Agency; Border Force; MI5

Website
- www.gov.uk/government/organisations/border-security-command

The Border Security Command (BSC) is a law enforcement agency in the United Kingdom to be responsible for coordinating the activities of Immigration Enforcement, MI5, Border Force and the National Crime Agency to attempt to tackle smuggling gangs which facilitate illegal migrant crossings over the English Channel. The first steps towards establishing it was announced in July 2024 by then-Home Secretary Yvette Cooper to replace the Rwanda asylum plan and is now led by the Border Security Commander, who answers to the home secretary.

The command was first proposed by the Labour Party in May 2024 as an alternative to the Conservative government's Rwanda asylum plan, with the aim of tackling the ongoing crisis of illegal migrant crossings on the English Channel. After Labour's victory in the 2024 general election, the command was launched by Home Secretary Yvette Cooper on 7 July 2024. In March 2026 it was announced that Martin Hewitt, the first Commander, would step down. He has been replaced by Duncan Capps, who previously ran the operational arm of the BSC as Director Small Boats Operations, on an interim basis.

== History ==
The Border Security Command was first proposed in a speech by Labour Party leader Keir Starmer in May 2024. The party planned to create a new border security command if it entered government. The command would be responsible for tackling the ongoing crisis of illegal migrant crossings on the English Channel by coordinating the activities of government agencies such as MI5 in prosecuting people smuggling gangs that facilitate illegal immigration to the United Kingdom.

The command was proposed as Labour's alternative to the Rwanda asylum plan of the incumbent Conservative government, which the party claimed would fail to tackle the migrant crossings across the Channel and criticised as a waste of money. The command was further detailed in Change, the Labour Party's manifesto for the 2024 general election, as one of its main manifesto commitments. In the manifesto, the party pledged to establish the command with counter-terrorism powers to enable it to prosecute people smugglers should it enter government. It would be funded by ending the Rwanda asylum plan and reallocating the money pledged for the plan to the command, which the party said would enable it to "pursue, disrupt and arrest those responsible for the vile trade". Starmer said he wanted to raise around £75 million from the defunct plan each year to fund the command.

Following Labour's victory in the 2024 general election and the formation of the Starmer ministry on 5 July, the new Labour government scrapped the Rwanda asylum plan on the day it entered office. On 7 July, the new home secretary Yvette Cooper launched the Border Security Command (BSC) to replace the plan, accompanied by an audit into the money already granted to the Rwandan government through the plan to see if the UK government could take it back, as well as new counter-terrorism legislation which would be drawn up in the coming weeks to tackle illegal immigration. The command would be funded by money previously earmarked for the Rwanda plan and would be responsible for coordinating the activities of Immigration Enforcement, MI5, the Border Force and the National Crime Agency in tackling smuggling gangs which facilitate illegal migrant crossings over the English Channel. The new office of Border Security Commander was also established, whose remit would be to lead the new command and its members, with the government expecting the appointment of the first officeholder to be made in the coming weeks. A team in the Home Office was tasked with setting out the remit of the command, as well as its governance structure and its strategic direction.

== Organisation ==
=== Border Security Commander ===
Border Security Commander
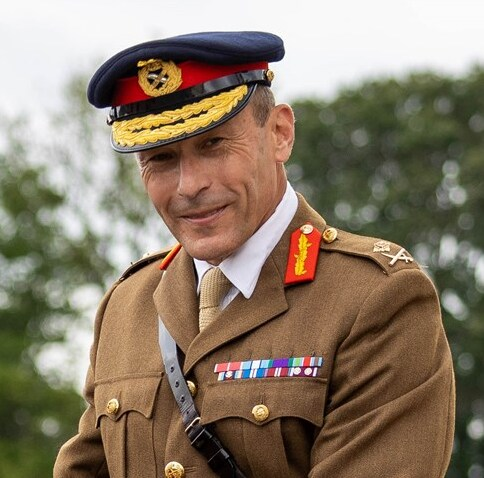
- Incumbent; Duncan Capps; Acting since 1 April 2026
- Reports to: Home Secretary
- Appointer: Home Secretary
- Inaugural holder: Martin Hewitt
- Formation: 15 September 2024

The Border Security Command is led by the Border Security Commander, who answers to the Home Secretary; the office is currently held on an interim basis by Duncan Capps, who was appointed to the role in April 2026, by the current Home Secretary.

List of Border Security Commanders

1. Martin Hewitt (2024–2026)
2. Duncan Capps (interim, April 2026-present)

== See also ==
- Maritime Border Command
