= Keith Hawkins =

English poker player (born 1967)

Keith Hawkins Jnr
- Nickname: The Camel
- Born: 1967 (age 58–59)

World Series of Poker
- Bracelet: None
- Money finishes: 7
- Highest WSOP Main Event finish: 75th, 2008

World Poker Tour
- Title: None
- Final table: None
- Money finish: 1

European Poker Tour
- Title: None
- Final table: None
- Money finishes: 100

Keith Hawkins (born 1967) is an English professional poker player, based in North Yorkshire.

== Early years ==
Hawkins claims he got hooked on gambling after placing his first winning bet on the 1974 Derby (10p on Snow Knight at 66/1.) He began playing five card draw at school as a teenager, and was later introduced to Texas hold 'em by Neil Channing.

== Poker career ==
Hawkins is a regular on the European poker tournament circuit, with tournament wins in Southampton, Luton, Dundee, London and Sheffield.

Amongst these wins was the £1,500 no limit hold 'em event at the Grosvenor UK Open 2002, where he defeated Jan Sjavik to win the £39,000 first prize.

As of 2007, his total live tournament winnings exceed $700,000. This ranks him in the top 40,000 players of all time.

=== Online poker ===
On 14 May 2006, Hawkins finished 7th in the PokerStars $1,000,000 guaranteed tournament, for over $20,000. He plays online as The Camel.

== Poker writing ==
Hawkins writes regular articles for Card Player Magazine and The Hendon Mob's website and also posts on their forum as The Camel. He also posts on the BlondePoker and Two Plus Two forums.

== Personal life ==
Outside of poker, Hawkins has one son, Jake, born 30 September 2005. He supports Queens Park Rangers F.C.
