= Independent Anti-Slavery Commissioner =

Public office in the United Kingdom

The Independent Anti-Slavery Commissioner is a position created by the Modern Slavery Act 2015.

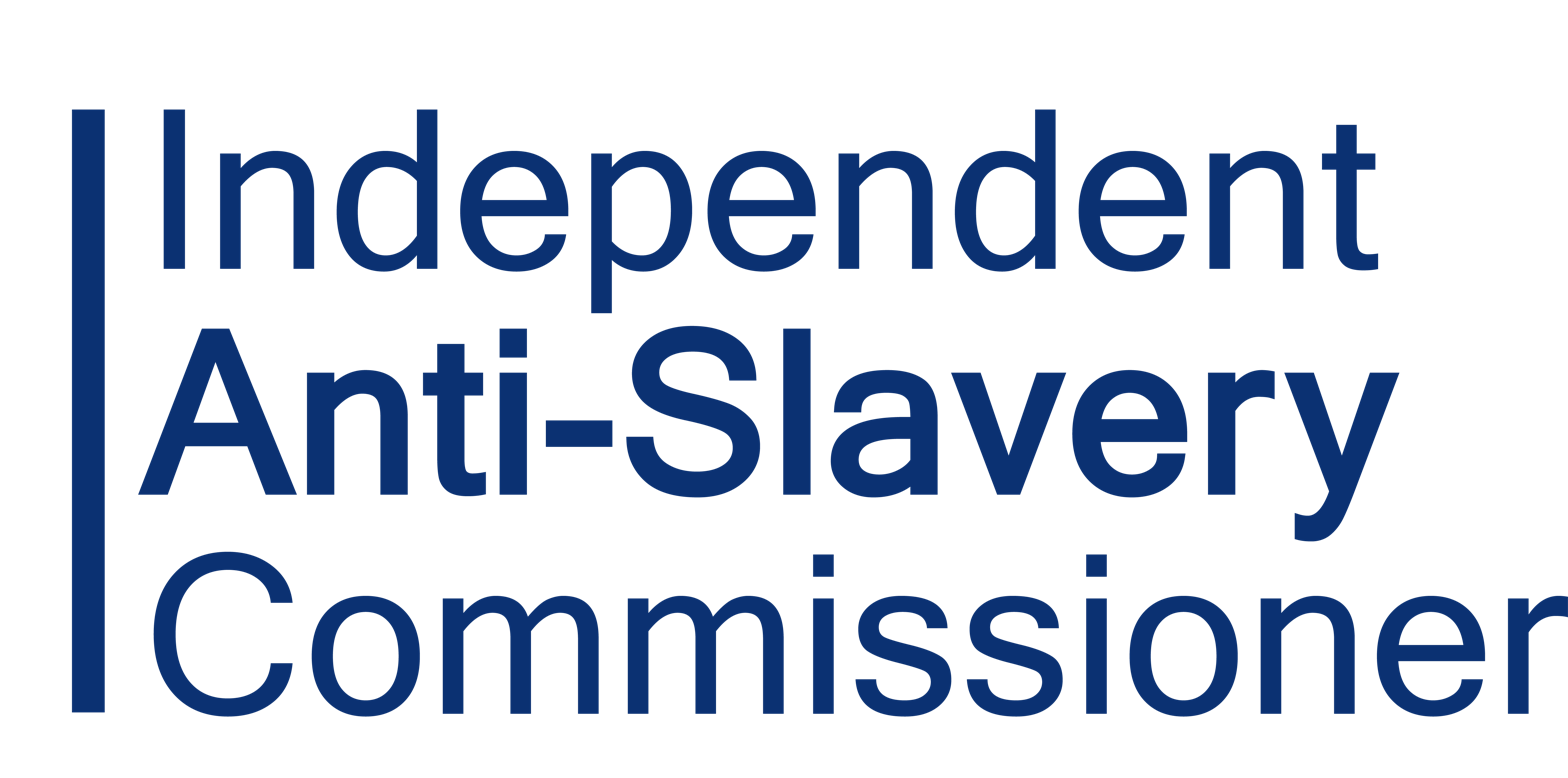
Independent Anti-Slavery Commissioner

The role complements the existing role of Victims' Commissioner to ensure that modern slavery issues are tackled in a coordinated and effective manner across the UK. The role involves working closely with law enforcement agencies, local authorities, third sector organisations and internationally to encourage good practice in the identification of victims and the prevention, detection, investigation and prosecution of modern slavery crimes, including international collaboration. The role requires published annual reports for Parliamentary scrutiny.

Section 40 of the Modern Slavery Act 2015 provides the Home Secretary's power to appoint a person to the role.

== Commissioners ==
The current Commissioner is Eleanor Lyons, the former deputy Children's Commissioner, who was appointed to the post for a 3-year term on 11 October 2023.

Commissioner	Took office	Left office	Period	Appointed by
Kevin Hyland	November 2014 (initially as 'designate' Commissioner)	May 2018	3 years and 6 months	Theresa May
Vacant	May 2018	May 2019	1 year	
Sara Thornton	May 2019	April 2022	2 years and 11 months	Sajid Javid
Vacant	April 2022	December 2023	1 year and 8 months	
Eleanor Lyons	December 2023			Suella Braverman
