= 2025 UK refugee plan =

2025 proposed change to UK law

The 2025 UK refugee plan is a proposed change to the United Kingdom's asylum and immigration system. The plan was announced and led by the home secretary, Shabana Mahmood, and presented to Parliament on 18 November 2025. Based on the immigration model in Denmark it is described as the most significant change to the UK's asylum policy in modern times. The plan is intended to reduce irregular and illegal migration, particularly addressing the small boat crossings in the English Channel, while maintaining pathways for people fleeing conflict and persecution.

The proposals that move away from the Conservative "Rwanda asylum plan", will provide temporary protection for refugees instead of long term status. In addition it will take much longer for many refugees to get permanent residence. The government will have the means to decide and enforce which asylum seekers are permitted to get housing and money.

== Background ==
In 1951 the UK signed the Convention Relating to the Status of Refugees and its 1967 protocol. The system operated since then, allows people to ask for asylum after they arrive in the country, and it has separate programs that bring selected refugees from other countries. During the mid 2020s the asylum seekers numbers was one of the highest ever, more than 100,000 in a year. This caused immense pressure on the system needing to process cases and house the people. Eventually politicians focused more on border control.

In 2022 the Conservative government tried to address the issue with the "Rwanda asylum plan", which enabled the UK to send some people who arrived in the UK in irregular ways to Rwanda, where their asylum claims would be examined. If they were accepted as refugees, they would stay in Rwanda and not come back to live in the UK. The plan was ruled unlawful in 2023 by the UK Supreme Court.

During 2024 the government passed the Safety of Rwanda (Asylum and Immigration) Act saying Rwanda is a safe country, but before it began the government lost the 2024 general election, ending the plan. The new elected government cancelled the Rwanda law through Border Security, Asylum and Immigration Bill. Funds were redirected to a new border enforcement unit facing the UK asylum claims of more than 5,000 people who had previously been marked to be sent to Rwanda. The new 2025 UK refugee plan was conceived as an alternative asylum policy.

== 2025 refugee plan ==
The key features of the 2025 refugee plan are:

- Temporary refugee status; refugees will get temporary protection for about 30 months, and the government will check their status regularly. There will no longer be automatic permanent protection, and refugees may have to go back to their home country once the government decides it is safe.
- Extended Residency Requirement; the wait time to apply for permanent settlement in the UK will be extended from 5 to 20 years, which is a significant tightening of residency requirements.
- Discretionary support; the government will no longer be obligated to provide asylum seekers with housing and money, it will be a matter of choice. Those asylum seekers who can work or on the other hand commit crimes will be refused housing and financial help.
- Safe and legal routes; the 2025 refugee plan creates more safe and legal ways for "genuine" refugees to enter the UK. The ways include a system used in Canada, where local communities can help bring and support refugees, but the numbers are limited.
- Family reunification and deportations; there will be strict rules regarding family reunification, as the government will increase measures against people without permission to stay in the UK, sending back to their country of origin. This is meant to stop people from coming through unsafe, illegal routes, like crossing the Channel in small boats.

== Reception ==
Human rights and refugee charities have criticised the plan, saying the proposed changes are too harsh on refugees, lacking ways to truly determine those running away from brutal and violent conflicts. it also undermines their ability to integrate with the local community and build new lives for themselves. The government states it is essential to introduce changes due to the growing numbers of illegal refugees, refugee claims and keep the system working for a long time period. The far-right activist Tommy Robinson, who earlier in the year had led the Unite the Kingdom rally in London, welcomed Mahmood's proposals to overhaul the asylum system, posting on social media that "the Overton window has been obliterated, well done patriots".

== See also ==
- English Channel illegal migrant crossings (2018–present)
- Immigration to Denmark
- Modern immigration to the United Kingdom
- One in, one out policy
- Safety of Rwanda (Asylum and Immigration) Act 2024
- United Kingdom–France one in, one out plan
