= Stop the boats =

Australian and British political slogan

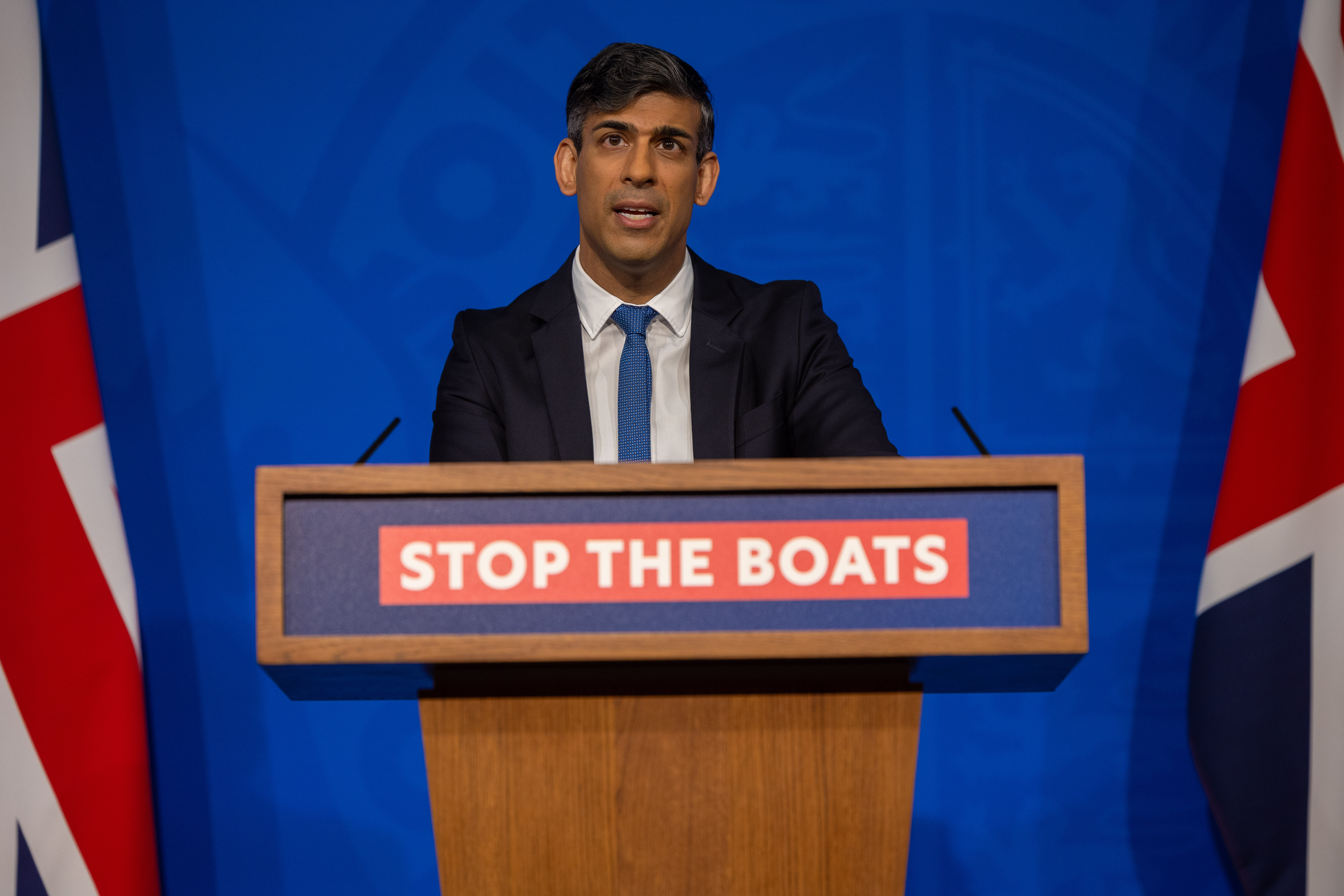
British prime minister Rishi Sunak used a lectern reading "stop the boats" in an April 2024 press conference on the Rwanda asylum plan.

"Stop the boats" is a political slogan and pledge used by Tony Abbott in his campaign for the 2013 Australian federal election, and later by former British prime minister Rishi Sunak from 2023 to 2024. It opposes the existence of boat crossings by asylum seekers.

The slogan was more specifically used in support of Operation Sovereign Borders in Australia which successfully stopped boat arrivals from countries such as Indonesia, Iran, and Sri Lanka, and in support of the Rwanda asylum plan in the United Kingdom, a cancelled attempt to halt small boat crossings of the English Channel. It was the main slogan of the Rwanda asylum plan under Sunak, a response to English Channel migrant crossings to the United Kingdom.

Following the victory of the Labour Party in the 2024 general election, Keir Starmer did not pledge to "stop the boats", stating that the Rwanda policy was "a gimmick" and not responding directly to questions about whether his specific aim was to "stop the boats", instead stating that he would "smash the gangs to stop those crossings." The "stop the boats" slogan was chanted and used to mobilise support for the 2024 far-right anti-immigration riots in England and Northern Ireland.

== Use ==
=== Australia ===
At the start of his campaign for Prime Minister of Australia, Tony Abbott included the phrase in his launch speech on 25 August 2013, stating "we'll build a stronger economy so everyone can get ahead. We'll scrap the carbon tax so your family will be $550 a year better off. We'll get the budget back under control by ending Labor's waste. We'll stop the boats." On 6 June of the same year, he committed to "stop the boats" within his first term. During his first few months as Leader of the Opposition, he had previously spoken in a 2010 joint doorstop interview with Scott Morrison, who was opposition immigration spokesman at the time; Morrison had said that "we will have the solution to ensure that we stop the boats." Abbott's specific policy entailed Operation Sovereign Borders, in which migrants on boats were to be intercepted and either taken to overseas island detention centres or returned to where they travelled from. Abbott was elected Prime Minister with the commitment to honour the slogan as a mandate. In 2014, Abbott further stated that "as long as the boats keep coming, we will keep having deaths at sea," and that "the most decent, humane and compassionate thing you can do is to stop the boats."

ABC News Fact Check determined that the promise to "stop the boats" had been delivered on 30 April 2015, when only one boat had arrived in 18 months, after 300 had arrived in 2013.

=== United Kingdom ===
Prime Minister of the United Kingdom Rishi Sunak also pledged to "stop the boats" as one of his five promises in a speech on 4 January 2023, stating that "we will pass new laws to stop small boats, making sure that if you come to this country illegally, you are detained and swiftly removed," and that he would "halve inflation, grow the economy, reduce debt, cut waiting lists, and stop the boats." As a result, this became the main slogan of the Rwanda asylum plan under Sunak, a response to English Channel migrant crossings to the United Kingdom.

Several journalists criticised the term following its first use by Sunak. Daniel Sandford, writing for BBC News, criticised Sunak's initial five promises speech, asking "what exactly is the prime minister promising – to 'stop the boats' or to 'pass new laws to stop small boats'?" Refugee law expert Madeline Gleeson said that the UK would struggle to implement its proposed policies in the same way as Australia, as it was a "totally different place". Stephen Bush wrote for the Financial Times in December that "no country in the world has managed to reduce the amount of irregular migration to zero. But it would, I think, land very badly for him were Sunak to pivot from 'stop the boats' to 'look at how effective I've been at reducing the total number of boats'." Filippo Grandi, the United Nations High Commissioner for Refugees, stated that the policy, as well as Donald Trump's "build the wall" policy, were "fake responses" to the issue of illegal migration.

On 19 December 2023, Sunak stated that there was "no firm date" to meet the pledge. In January 2024, upon the passing of the Safety of Rwanda (Asylum and Immigration) Bill, a spokesperson for Sunak stated that "the passing of the bill tonight marks a major step in our plan to stop the boats". In June 2024, The Daily Telegraph reported that 40,000 migrants had crossed the English Channel since Sunak had said he would "stop the boats". Following a cross-party report which found that the Rwanda plan lacked credibility, The Independent wrote in May 2024 that the slogan was "now less of an election-winning soundbite than a rather pathetic epitaph".

Following the victory of the Labour Party in the 2024 general election, Keir Starmer did not pledge to "stop the boats", stating that the Rwanda policy was "a gimmick" and not responding directly to questions about whether his specific aim was to "stop the boats", instead stating that he would "smash the gangs to stop those crossings." In March 2025 Sunak stated that he regretted the slogan, stating that it was "too stark".

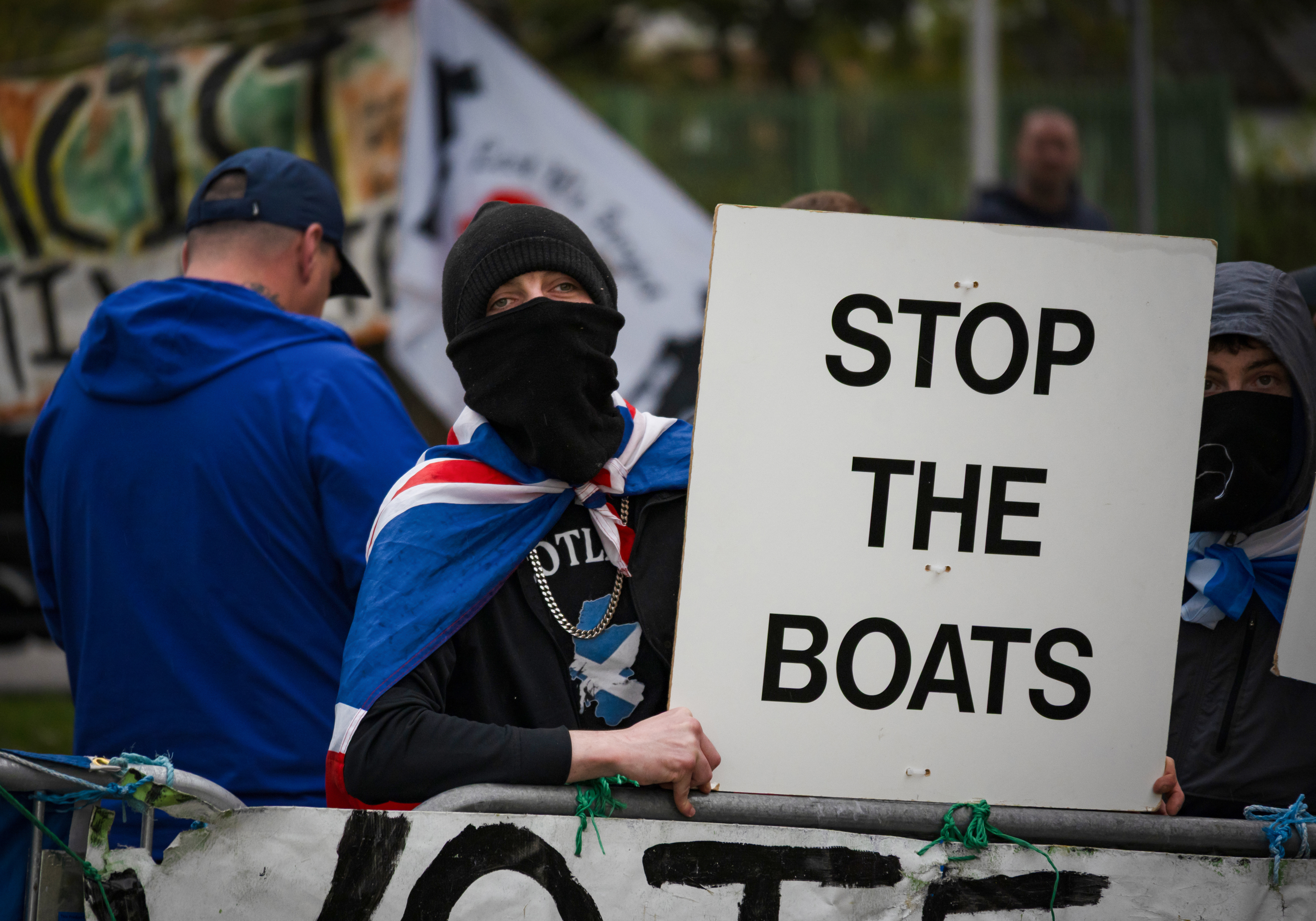
Protestor holding a "stop the boats" sign

The "stop the boats" slogan was chanted and used to mobilise support for the 2024 United Kingdom riots in early August. On 8 August 2024, former Defence Secretary Grant Shapps, who had previously defended Sunak's pledge, stated that he had thought "from the outset" that the slogan was "never going to be provable", comparing it to saying "stop crime". In September 2024, former Home Secretary James Cleverly called the slogan an "error" and "an unachievable target". The slogan has since become associated with far-right politics in the United Kingdom, with it also being used in the 2025 anti-immigration protests.

== Analysis ==
Analysis of the slogan's use in both countries has led to the drawing of several similarities between the two, including language that appeals to "island mindsets" such as referring to asylum seekers and migrants as criminals or an "invasion", thereby stirring up "fears of outsiders". Other similarities include the use of the slogan in stressing the humanitarian benefits of the policies.

== See also ==
- "Build the Wall" – American political slogan
- "Take back control" – British political slogan
