= English Channel illegal migrant crossings (2018–present) =

Part of the European migrant crisis

English Channel migrant crossings

Refugees and migrants have been entering the United Kingdom by crossing the English Channel since 2018. The Strait of Dover section between Dover in England and Calais in France represents the shortest sea crossing, and is a long-established shipping route. The shortest distance across the strait, at approximately 20 miles (32 kilometres), is from the South Foreland, northeast of Dover in the English county of Kent, to Cap Gris-Nez, a cape near to Calais in the French département of Pas-de-Calais.

As of 14 November 2026, the Home Office has detected 216,592 migrants who have crossed the English Channel in small boats since 2018. Crossing the Channel without permission is a criminal offence under UK law, as is to attempt to use a dangerous type of vessel or any unregistered craft under French law. International refugee law protects most persons who present a particularised claim to seek refugee status (asylum seekers) from being penalised, where their dominant purpose can be shown to be seeking entry to an initial, or further, safe country. More than 130 people are confirmed to have died in the northern French marine, as opposed to roads, sector during this period of shift to maritime routes. Many more deaths of people attempting to enter Europe without prior permission occur on the Mediterranean routes each year; for example in 2025 over 1,500 deaths occurred on the central Mediterranean route, while 36 were listed as missing between mainland Europe and the UK.

== Background ==
Seaborne crossings aboard small boats by both credible refugees and people not legally entitled to regularise their intended new residency were rare before 2018; however, some crossings were recorded in the summer of 2016 during the European migrant crisis. More commonly, migrants stowed away aboard trains, lorries, or ferry boats, a technique that has become more difficult in recent years as British authorities have intensified searches of such vehicles and funded the construction of border fences in France. Prices charged by smugglers for illegal rides across the Channel in lorries, trains and ferries have risen sharply. Rumours that entering and claiming asylum in the UK would become more difficult once Brexit went into effect circulated in migrant encampments in France, possibly fomented by people smugglers hoping to drum up business. Brexit resulted in the UK leaving the Dublin regulations, removing the right to return those unlawful entrants with a provable tie or their own stated non-transit presence in other EU member states.

If migrants who prove themselves to be from several countries arrive in England through illegal means, upon arrival the UK Government is unlikely to reject their claims to asylum. In 2019, at least 1,890 migrants arrived from France via small boats; the Home Office reported that only around 125 were returned to other European countries.

Since November 2018, the number of migrants crossing has grown. The total number of migrants arriving by this route during 2018 was 297. In 2019 and 2020 the numbers grew significantly, and by September 2020 an estimated total of 7,500 had entered Britain by this route. The number of crossings rose further to 45,755 in 2022 before declining to 29,437 in 2023. Others continue to arrive via other routes some of which at least during entry and an initial period unnoticed.

Until the dispersal of the Calais Jungle in 2016, which contained an estimated 3,000 would-be immigrants to the UK, the majority of asylum seekers entering the country via the English Channel did so through the Channel Tunnel, mostly by hiding in vehicles.

With the increase in numbers crossing the channel in 2019, politicians attached the label "crisis" to the sudden increase in seaborne crossings. Former home secretary Sajid Javid preferred to describe the increase in crossings as a "major incident." Journalist and former Scottish Labour Party MP Tom Harris argued that the small boat crossings that are occurring are not a "crisis."

In 2023, UK prime minister Rishi Sunak raised the profile of the channel crossings with his campaign to 'Stop the boats', and his subsequent failed attempt to implement the Conservative Party's planned relocation of migrants and asylum seekers to Rwanda.

== Timeline ==
=== Before 2015 to 2016 ===
The BBC first reported on small, sporadic numbers of boats with migrants on board arriving off the Kent coast from France in 2015. Although there were boats before this they were not seen as an issue. Tony Smith said during his time as gold commander for the London 2012 Olympics and head of Border Force, he was unaware of any arrivals by boat and had been "advised that it wasn't a threat" given the difficulty of the currents and activity levels of shipping lanes. The focus at the time had been more on arrivals via ferries and lorries, and Smith said that "I think the reason people shifted to the boats was because we'd done quite well in stopping them coming in by other routes". Smith said he was "very surprised" to see small boats and dinghies arriving, and speculates that "As soon as the migrants and smugglers realised this was a viable route, they were getting ashore, they weren't being sent back and more started to come."

BBC South East first reported on a handful of boat arrivals in 2014 and 2015, with around 100 people arriving in 2016 - but at that stage the incidents weren't published by the Home Office.

=== 2018 ===
The first migrants to have been recorded landing in the UK by small boat as recorded by the government was on 31 January 2018 when seven people crossed in a single boat. In 2018, 539 refugees and migrants "tried to reach Britain on small boats." Many were intercepted and returned to France. As many as 434 migrants are known to have made the crossing in small boats in October, November and December 2018, 100 in November 2018, 230 in December.

Following the surge in migrant crossing incidents in November and December, on 28 December 2018 the UK Home secretary declared a major incident regarding refugees attempting to cross the channel. As many as 227 refugees and migrants were intercepted and returned to the continent by French authorities in 2018, "at least" 95 refugees and migrants in December alone. By way of comparison, 26,547 asylum claims were filed by would be refugees in the UK in 2017.

=== 2019 ===
During the course of 2019, almost 1,900 had made the crossing by the end of the year.

From July to December 2019, an average of approximately 200 people made the crossing per month.

=== 2020 ===
In April 2020, boat arrivals for that month was over 400 – the highest monthly total ever recorded.

In July, the number of people crossing almost matched the combined total of May and June, with more migrants encouraged by good weather and calm seas.

In August, it was reported that in 2020 so far almost 4,000 people had crossed the Channel illegally, using at least 300 small boats. On 6 August a record number of migrants arrived, at least 235. It has also been observed that while it was originally mostly men that were arriving, young children and pregnant women and babies are now often among those arriving.

The total number of migrants recorded to have crossed into the UK in 2020 was 3,948 as of 7 August.

According to analysis by PA Media, the number of migrants reaching the UK shore has gone beyond 4,100 people in 2020. The Home Office confirmed that 151 migrants came ashore on 8 August. French authorities claimed that in the first six months of 2020, the number of migrants crossing the English Channel increased by five times, as compared to the last year.

On 19 August a Sudanese man, Abdulfatah Hamdallah, drowned in the Channel making the journey from France. He died after his and his friend's inflatable dinghy, which they were powering using shovels as oars, capsized. While his companion and British news media claimed he was 16 years old, Boulogne-sur-Mer's deputy public prosecutor Philippe Sabatier said a travel document provided by Hamdallah gave his age as 28. The pair had previously been living in the Calais Jungle for at least two months prior.

By 20 October, the total number of crossings in 2020 reached 7,294.

On 27 October, a Kurdish-Iranian family of five from Sardasht died after a boat capsized outside France on way to reach the UK. Artin Irannezhad, a 15-month old toddler from the shipwreck, washed up on Karmøy island on 1 January 2021.

By the end of the year, about 635 boats had crossed the Channel, carrying 8,438 people.

=== 2021 ===
On 1 January 2021, the UK officially left the Dublin regulations as part of the UK's departure from the EU (Brexit). This removed the UK from legislation that legally allowed the UK to return migrants to other EU member states.

Illegal crossings continued in 2021, including 103 people on 10 January and 77 people on 24 February.

On 19 July 430 people crossed the channel, making it the largest crossing on record. 1,850 people had crossed in July alone, which is more than the total for the whole of 2019.

On 11 November, a new record daily number of migrant crossings occurred, with around 1,000 people intercepted by border patrols. The cumulative total of 23,000 for the year was reported as far higher than previous years.

On 24 November, the deadliest incident on record occurred. An inflatable dinghy carrying 30 migrants capsized while attempting to reach the UK, resulting in 27 deaths and one person missing. The victims included a pregnant woman and three children. In September 2026, after a four week trial in Paris, six people were found guilty of involuntary homicide in relation to the November 2021 disaster: they were sentenced to prison terms of between six and 10 years. Seven further people were sentenced for lesser crimes in relation to the case.

=== 2022 ===
On one day in January, 271 migrants crossed the Channel.

In March 2022, More than 3,000 people arrived in small boats, compared to 831 in March 2021.

In April 2022 Boris Johnson announced the Rwanda asylum plan in an attempt to deter people from making Channel crossings.

In the first week of August 1,886 people crossed the Channel.

On 14 August, government figures showed that 20,000 people had crossed the channel in small boats since the start of the year. They stated 60,000 were expected to make the crossing in 2022.

On 22 August, a total of 1,295 migrants crossed the Channel in 27 boats, setting a new record for crossings in a single day.

As at 30 October, the total for the year of 2022 stood at 39,430.

The BBC reported that 45,755 people crossed the Channel in small boats for the year 2022.

=== 2023 ===
The Home Office predicted that the number of people arriving on small boats could reach 85,000 for the whole of 2023. In the first three months of the year, 675 Indians arrived by small boats becoming the second most common nationality after Afghans (909). The number of Albanians arriving by small boats fell to 29.

On 12 August, an overloaded boat sank resulting in the death of six people, all believed to be Afghan men in their 30s.

In the first eight months of the year, just over 20,000 migrants have arrived using small boats. This figure is 20% lower than at the same point of time in 2022, with the month of August seeing a 38% reduction in crossings compared to 2022 (8,631 migrants in 2022 compared to 5,369 in 2023). By the middle of November 2023, the number of people arriving by small boat crossings has continued to fall with a 33% reduction recorded compared to the same point of time last year. The Immigration Minister Robert Jenrick has stated the fall in numbers was achieved in spite of better weather conditions and a significant rise in irregular arrivals across Europe, with the number of people crossing the Mediterranean to Italy more than doubling compared to the previous year.

Overall, 2023 saw a 36% fall in crossings compared to 2022, however the Immigration Services Union described the fall as a "glitch" with "higher numbers" expected for 2024.

=== 2024 ===
On 14 January, five migrants trying to cross the channel were found dead on a beach on the channel coast of northern France.

On 28 February, the death of three migrants attempting to cross the channel from Cap Gris Nez was confirmed by French authorities. The number of Channel crossings is 32% lower than the total recorded at the same point of time last year, but 49% higher than the total at this stage in 2022.

For the first quarter of 2024, the most common nationality of people arriving from small boats was from Vietnam, with the 1,266 Vietnamese arrivals making up 20% of arrivals so far. In a statement delivered by Rishi Sunak, he stated “Vietnamese arrivals have increased ten-fold and account for almost all of the increase in small boat numbers we have seen this year".

On 23 April, the same day that the Safety of Rwanda bill passed, a French coast guard official reported the death of five migrants from 'crowd panic' during an attempt to cross the channel.

James Cleverly accused Labour of enabling people smugglers through ineffective policies, citing the arrival of over 700 migrants and two deaths in the Channel on 11 August 2024. He called on Labour to reverse these decisions and strengthen border control.

On 3 September, the bottom of a boat overcrowded with migrants ripped open, resulting in 12 deaths. During the year to date, more than 21,000 people had crossed the channel.

At 00:00 on 15 September, rescue services were alerted to a rubber boat north of Boulogne-sur-Mer that had got in a difficult situation. After hitting rocks it had started to come apart. The boat had 60 people on it; 8 people died in the incident and 6 were hospitalized.

On 5 October 2024, four people were killed in two incidents on boats attempting to cross the English Channel from France.

=== 2025 ===
According to The Daily Telegraph on 30 May 2025, heavy goods vehicles are putting signs on the back of their lorries saying that they don't go to the UK, written in both English and French.

The largest number of illegal immigrants to illegally enter the UK by crossing the English Channel on a single day in 2025 was 1,195 on 19 different boats on 31 May 2025.

The National Police Chiefs' Council (NPCC) reported that during the summer of 2025, police forces across the United Kingdom came under "chronic pressure" as a result of protests and disorder linked to the migrant crisis, asylum hotels, and Palestine Action. Over June, July and August 2025, more than 3,000 protests were managed by police—over three times the number recorded in 2023.

In the year to June 2025, UK Government statistics show as many as 110,000 migrants claimed asylum; this was an increase of 14% on the previous twelve month period.

On 6 September 2025, the UK saw its first 'uncontrolled landing' (an unescorted migrant boat reaching British shores) since December 2022.

=== 2026 ===
In May 2026, the Home Office revealed that more than 200,000 migrants had crossed the English Channel in small boats since records began in 2018.

On 23 July 2026, a 'mega dinghy' carrying 165 illegal migrants arrived in Britain, making it the largest number of migrants to cross in a single vessel since the crisis began.

On 4 August 2026, a fire broke out on a boat carrying 173 individuals. British vessels including the RNLI Eastbourne lifeboat and the Border Force's BSC Contender and BSC Courageous responded alongside French vessels. 105 migrants were taken by the French boats and 63 by British to Boulogne-sur-Mer in France, with 11 people suffering from minor injuries. An Egyptian national was later taken into police custody. The record number of individuals within a boat was broken again in August 2026 with 230 aboard arriving on one boat measuring 49 feet long on the morning of August 10.

On 6 September 2026, a dinghy carrying 140 people arrived at Eastney, Portsmouth, having made the much longer than usual crossing from Cherbourg. On 22 September and 4 October a similar route was used, with the arrivals taken respectively by lifeboat (after rescue south of the Isle of Wight on 22 September) and by coach (after arrival at Fort Blockhouse on 4 October) to Kent for processing.

== Statistics ==
=== Total number of crossings ===
Small Boat Arrivals
Year	Arrivals (% change from prior year)
2018	299
2019	1,843(+516.4%)
2020	8,462(+359.1%)
2021	28,526(+237.1%)
2022	45,755(+60.4%)
2023	29,437(-35.7%)
2024	36,816(+25.1%)
2025	41,472(+12.6%)
2026	23,882(As of 14 November)

=== Age and sex ===
The charts below are demographic breakdowns, as recorded by the Home Office, of the age and sex of small boat arrivals from January 2018 to December 2024. 147,568 illegal immigrants arrived via small boats between 2018 and 2024. 129,615 were male, 17,953 were female. 112,441 of the arrivals were between the ages of 18 and 39, representing the majority (76.2%) of those arriving.

Small boat arrivals by sex from 2018–2024
1. Male (87.8%)
2. Female (12.2%)
Small boat arrivals by age group from 2018–2024
1. Under 18 (16.4%)
2. 18—24 (33.9%)
3. 25—39 (42.3%)
4. 40+ (7.40%)

==== Countries of origin ====
Arrivals by nationality by year of arrival on small boats via the English Channel

Arrivals by year of arrival by nationality on small boats via the English Channel

In 2024, Afghans were the most common nationality among small boat arrivals, followed by Syrians and Iranians.

January to December 2024
Rank	Nationality	Small Boat Arrivals	Per cent of Total
1	Afghanistan	5,919	16.1
2	Syria	4,623	12.6
3	Iran	4,137	11.2
4	Vietnam	3,595	9.8
5	Eritrea	3,385	9.2
6	Sudan	2,697	7.3
7	Iraq	2,092	5.7
	All other nationalities	8,929	24.3
	Not currently recorded	1,439	3.9
	Total (2024)	36,816	100

In 2023, there has been a change in the countries of origin of small boat arrivals. A 90% reduction in the number of Albanians crossing the Channel has been quoted by some government ministers, with 927 Albanians recorded for 2023 (2022: 12,301). The top 10 nationalities for 2023 are recorded below:

January to December 2023
Rank	Nationality	Small Boat Arrivals	Per cent of Total
1	Afghanistan	5,579	19.0
2	Iran	3,581	12.2
3	Turkey	3,060	10.4
4	Eritrea	2,668	9.1
5	Iraq	2,549	8.7
6	Syria	2,333	7.9
7	Sudan	1,633	5.6
8	Vietnam	1,331	4.5
9	India	1,194	4.1
10	Albania	927	3.2
	All other nationalities	4,582	15.6
	Not currently recorded	896	3.0
	Total (2023)	29,437	100

The top 10 nationalities by small boat arrivals to the United Kingdom, as recorded by the Home Office, are listed below for January to December 2022. Albanians represented the most significant increase in small boat arrivals, from 16 arrivals in 2018 to 12,301 arrivals in 2022, of whom 95% are male.

January to December 2022
Rank	Nationality	Small Boat Arrivals	Per cent of Total
1	Albania	12,301	26.9
2	Afghanistan	8,633	18.9
3	Iran	5,642	12.3
4	Iraq	4,377	9.6
5	Syria	2,916	6.4
6	Eritrea	1,942	4.2
7	Sudan	1,704	3.7
8	Egypt	1,160	2.5
9	Turkey	1,076	2.4
10	India	683	1.5
	All other nationalities	3,360	7.3
	Not currently recorded	1,961	4.3
	Total (2022)	45,755	100

Aggregated figures from January 2018 to December 2023 are recorded below.

January 2018 to December 2023
Rank	Nationality	Small Boat Arrivals	Per cent of Total
1	Iran	21,565	18.9
2	Afghanistan	16,670	14.6
3	Iraq	15,392	13.5
4	Albania	14,483	12.7
5	Syria	8,581	7.5
6	Eritrea	8,074	7.1
7	Sudan	5,428	4.7
8	Turkey	4,268	3.7
9	Vietnam	3,364	2.9
10	Egypt	2,465	2.2
11	India	2,073	1.8
12	Ethiopia	1,436	1.3
13	Kuwait	1,190	1.0
14	Georgia	886	0.8
15	Somalia	671	0.6
	All other nationalities	6,121	5.4
	Not currently recorded	1,678	1.5
	Total (2018–23)	114,345	100

In early 2019, it was reported that many of the people making the small boat crossings were from Iran. In the first half of 2022, Albanians made up 18% of recorded arrivals, Afghans 18% and Iranians 15%. In August 2022, it was reported that British government officials believed that Albanians now made up 50 to 60% of small boat migrant arrivals, with 1,727 Albanian arrivals recorded in May and June 2022 compared to only 898 between 2018 and 2021.

== Smuggling gangs ==
Crossings are usually arranged by smugglers who charge between £3,000 and £6,000 for a crossing attempt in a small boat. The smugglers often use stolen boats for the crossings.

On 2 January 2019, the National Crime Agency announced the arrest of a 33-year-old Iranian and a 24-year-old Briton in Manchester on suspicion of arranging the "illegal movement of migrants" across the English Channel.

== Deaths ==
Year	Deaths
2018	1
2019	5
2020	9
2021	37
2022	5
2023	15
2024	61
Total	133

Deaths have been reported in every year since the crossings began increasing in 2018. A notable incident occurred in November 2021 when 28 people drowned during one crossing attempt. 2024 saw a significant increase in channel crossing deaths, with 61 dead by the end of the year.

Some deaths have been from crushing (asphyxiation) within the boats, which typically are structurally inadequate for a channel crossing, and frequently deflate. Migrants, now up to an average of 53 and sometimes almost 100 per boat, may have little choice regarding loading and overlook or are unaware of the maximal design capacity for the conditions (overloading closely correlates with incidence of deaths).

== Reactions ==
=== Government response ===
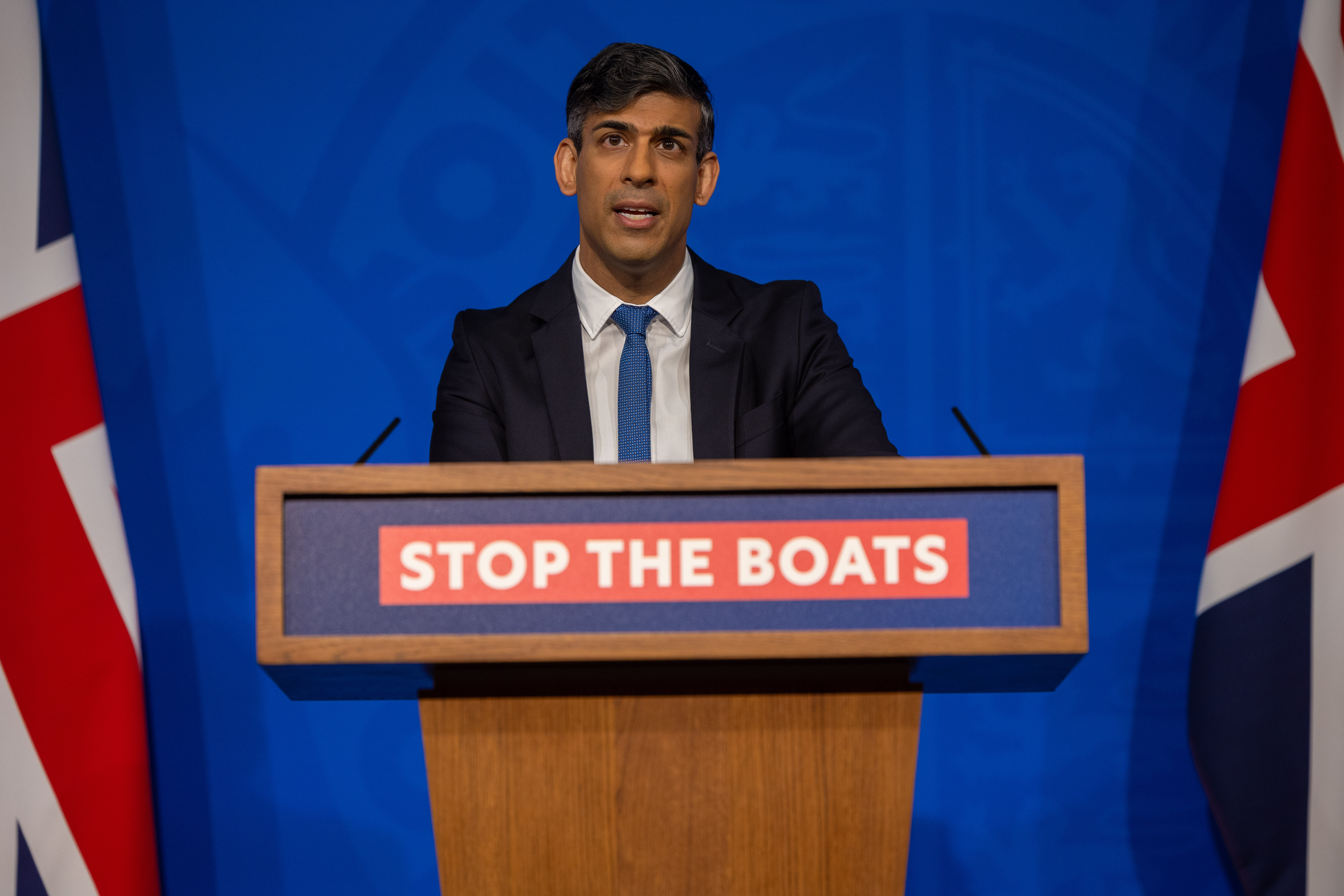
British former Prime Minister Rishi Sunak used a lectern reading "stop the boats" in an April 2024 press conference on the Rwanda asylum plan

In December 2018, then-Home Secretary Sajid Javid cut short a family holiday to devise a response to mounting small boat crossings. On 31 December 2018, Javid reversed a previous refusal to station additional Border Force cutters or hired crew transfer vessels (the current deployment) in the British half of the Channel (UK Territorial Waters) to intercept migrant small craft on the grounds that they would become a pull factor for migrants as in boats in legal distress (engaging the right to life as imminent risk of fatalities) so rapidly intercepted and thereby enabled to apply for asylum. In agreeing to send more, Javid promised to do "everything we can" to make sure that small boat migration "is not a success", including returning would-be migrants to France. Cutters were reassigned from Gibraltar and the Mediterranean to carry out the channel mission.

Javid stated that migrants crossing into UK waters from France or Belgium are not "genuine" asylum seekers, since they are already residing in a safe country.

In response to the increase in arrivals due to calm seas in July and August 2020, Javid's successor, Priti Patel, was reportedly "furious" and responded by saying she planned to make the English Channel (including Dover Strait) an "unviable" route into the UK. She sought military assistance from the Royal Navy to work with French authorities to prevent UK-bound migrant vessels from leaving France.

On 10 August 2020, Prime Minister Boris Johnson made a statement:

There's no doubt that it would be helpful if we could work with our French friends to stop them getting over the Channel. Be in no doubt, what's going on is the activity of cruel and criminal gangs who are risking the lives of these people taking them across the Channel, a pretty dangerous stretch of water, in potentially unseaworthy vessels. We want to stop that, working with the French, make sure that they understand that this isn't a good idea, this is a very bad and stupid and dangerous and criminal thing to do. But then there's a second thing we've got to do, and that is to look at the legal framework that we have that means that when people do get here, it is very, very difficult to then send them away again, even though blatantly they've come here illegally.

Since 7 September 2020, the UK government has deployed such monitors as the Thales Watchkeeper WK450, an unmanned aerial vehicle (UAV) to patrol the English Channel. The drones relay information to French and British border authorities, who can then rescue haphazard crossings insofar as their passengers enable this without risk to life.

In January 2021, all counter-migration operations in the English Channel were placed under the command of the Royal Navy and Operation Isotrope was launched.

In March 2021, the Home Office published a New Plan for Immigration Policy Statement, which included proposals to reform the immigration system, including the possibility of offshore processing of undocumented immigrants. In April 2021, 192 refugee, human rights, and other groups signed a letter which described these proposals as "vague, unworkable, cruel and potentially unlawful".

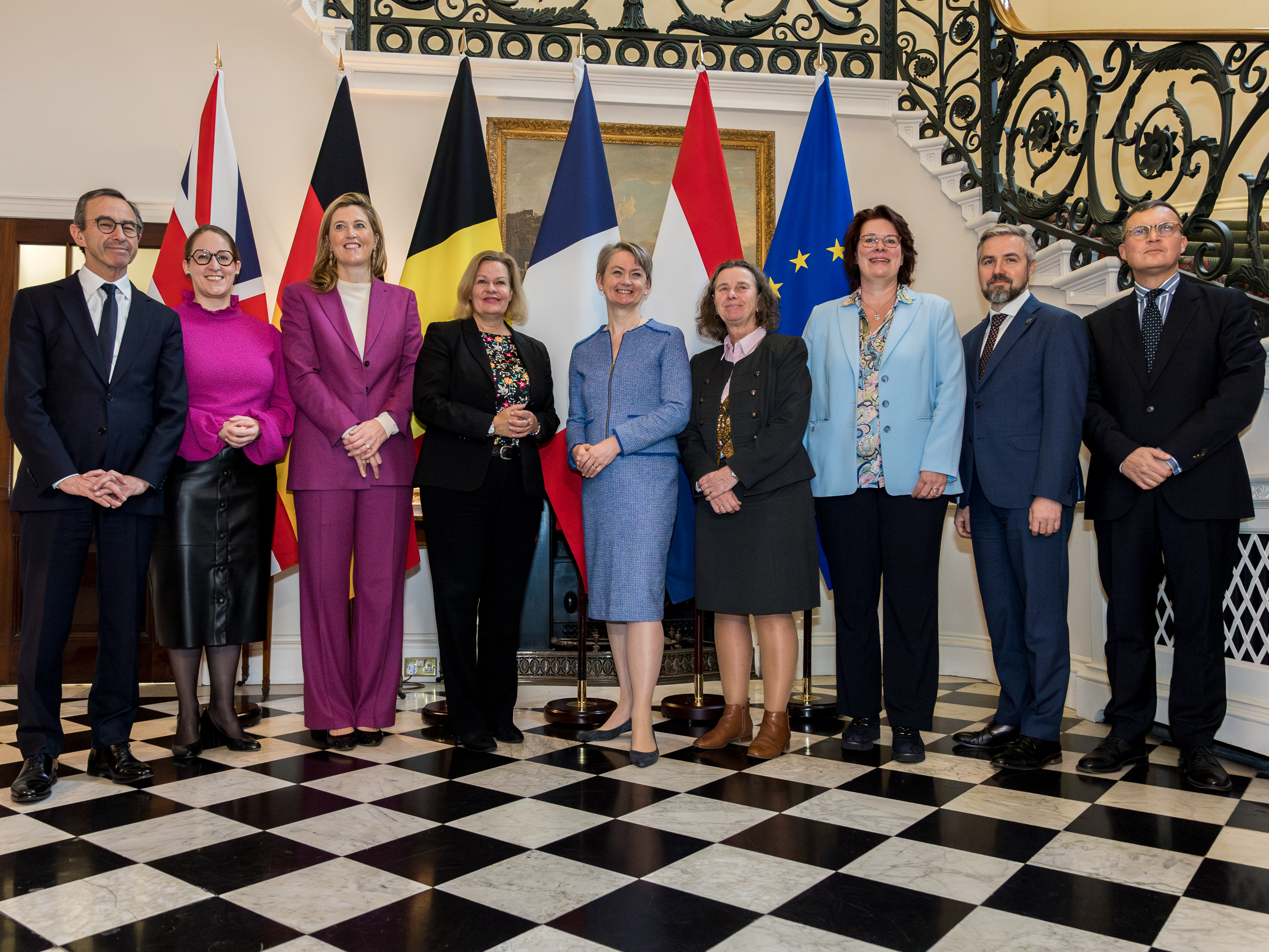
Cooper in London in December 2024 with counterparts to discuss irregular migration and migrant smuggling

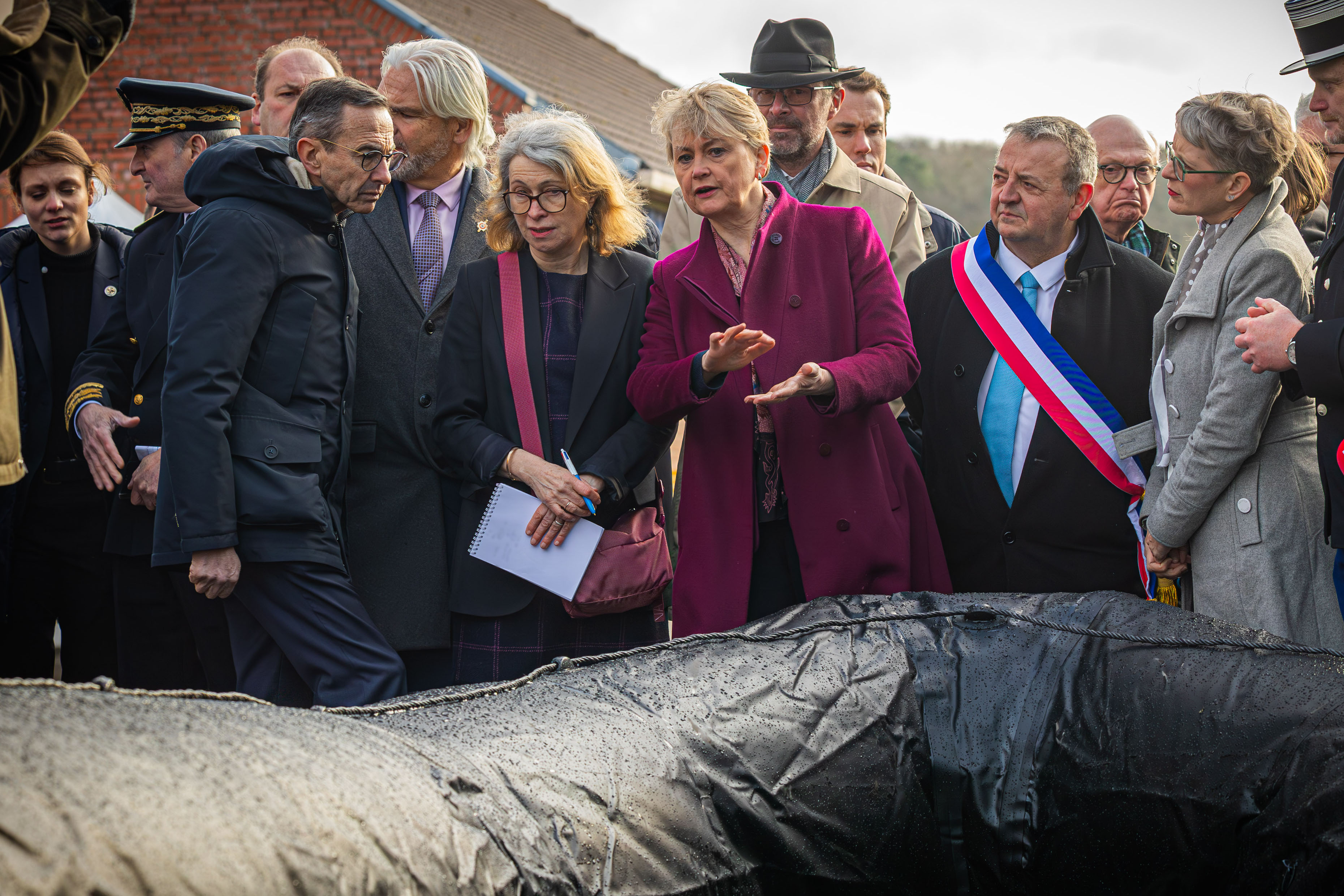
Cooper and her French counterpart Bruno Retailleau in northern France in February 2025, taking note of the French efforts to stem migrant crossings

Under Home Secretary Yvette Cooper and Prime Minister Sir Keir Starmer the incoming Labour government issued a new media statement, on 24 October 2024:

"We all want to end dangerous small boat crossings, which threaten lives and undermine our border security."

"The people-smuggling gangs do not care if the vulnerable people they exploit live or die, as long as they pay. We will stop at nothing to dismantle their business models and bring them to justice."
Background:
The government has recruited Martin Hewitt as Border Security Commander to lead the co-ordinated response to enhance our border protection. Our new Border Security Command will strengthen our global partnerships and enhance our efforts to investigate, arrest, and prosecute these evil criminals. The Border Security Command, backed by £75 million, is a key part of the plan to protect borders, remove those with no legal right to be in the UK, and introduce new counter-terror style powers. This government has already demonstrated its commitment to removing individuals who have no right to remain in the United Kingdom. Between 5 July and 31 August 2024, there were 1,240 enforced returns of people with no legal right to remain in the UK. This compares with 1,010 over the same period in 2023, an increase of 23%.

Including voluntary returns, from 5 July to 29 August, there had been a total of 3,600 returns.

A plan to introduce a compulsory digital identity card which Labour Together, a left wing thinktank, said should be called a BritCard, is expected to be announced by the prime minister, Keir Starmer, in September 2025 as an attempt to address voter concern over illegal immigration.

=== British public ===
According to a poll regarding use of the military to patrol the UK territorial waters half of the Channel conducted by YouGov in August 2020, 73% of Britons thought the crossings to be a serious issue. Conservative voters were most concerned, with 97% thinking it serious, whereas Labour voters were least concerned, with 49%.

=== International responses ===
After Abdulfatah Hamdallah drowned and washed up on French shores near Calais in August 2020, French National Assembly MP for Calais Pierre-Henri Dumont blamed the UK Government for the death because of their refusal to accept asylum claims from outside the country. He also stated that migrants in Calais "do not want to seek asylum in France" and "refuse state support", preferring to "risk their lives" in rafts.

== See also ==
- 2015 European migrant crisis
- France–United Kingdom border
- Illegal immigration to the United Kingdom
- Illegal Migration Act 2023
- Modern immigration to the United Kingdom
- Nationality and Borders Act 2022
- Operation Mare Nostrum (Italy)
- Operation Sovereign Borders
- Operation Triton
- Rwanda asylum plan
- Stop the boats
- United Kingdom–France one in, one out plan
- Weaponized migration
- 2025 UK refugee plan
