= Qirjako Qirko =

Albanian diplomat and former attorney

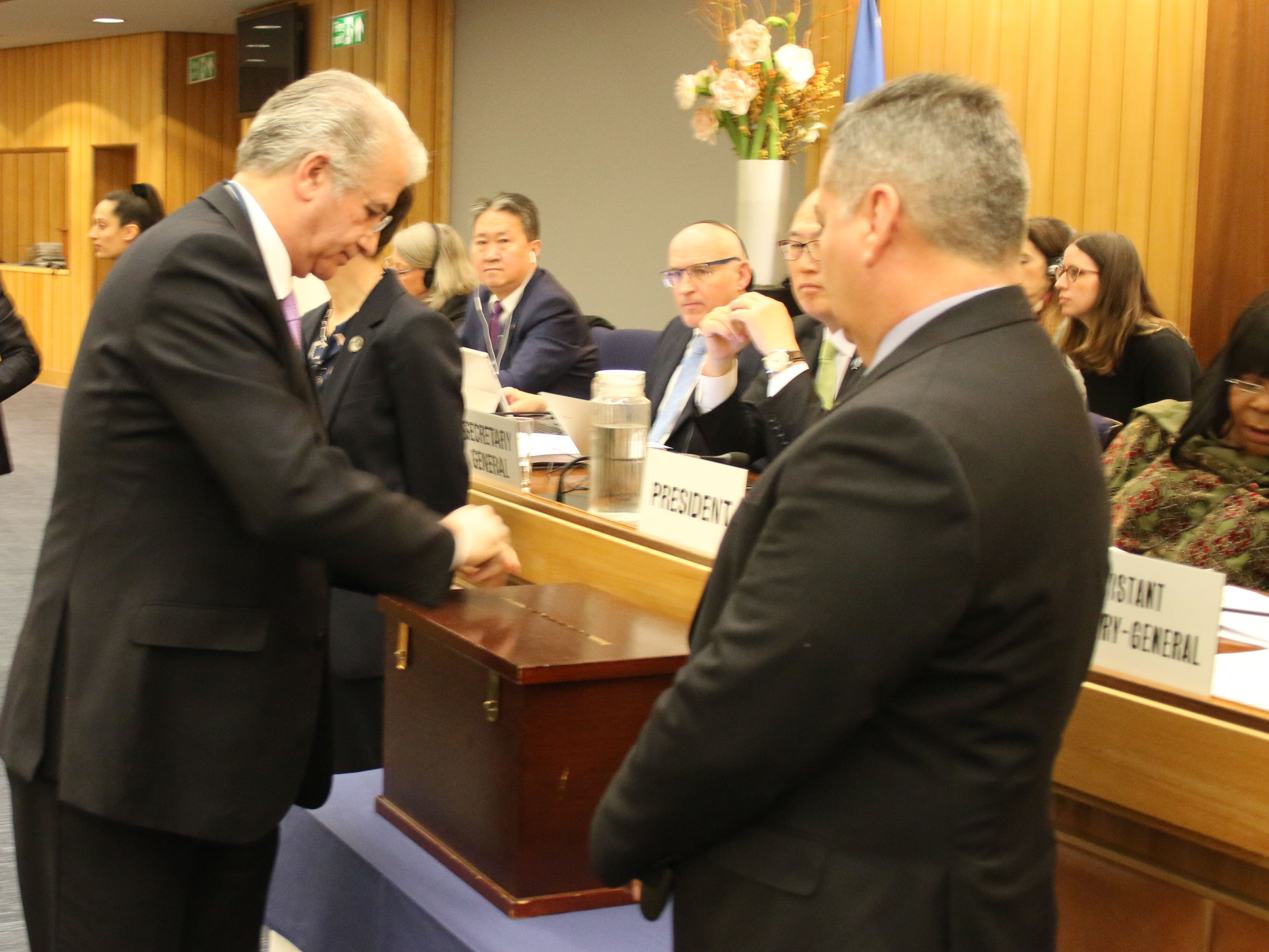
- Qirko (left) voting at the IMO in 2019

Ambassador of Albania to the Republic of Ireland
- In office 2018–2023

Ambassador of Albania to the United Kingdom and Northern Ireland
- In office 26 August 2016 – 12 July 2023

Permanent Representative of Albania to the International Maritime Organization

Personal details
- Born: 1 June 1961 (age 64)

Qirjako Qirko (born on 1 June 1961 is an Albanian diplomat and former attorney. Until July 2023 he served as the ambassador of the Republic of Albania to the United Kingdom of Great Britain and Northern Ireland (since 26 August 2016), and the Republic of Ireland (since 2018). Qirko was a permanent representative of Albania to the International Maritime organisation.

== Career ==
Appearing before the Home Affairs Select Committee of the United Kingdom's House of Commons in December 2022, Qirko called for an end to a “campaign of discrimination” and warned against reinforcing negative stereotypes about Albanians after the British government discussed a rise in English Channel migrant crossings with Home Secretary Suella Braverman Albanian highlighting Albanian criminals during a debate. He described the recent Albanian migrants as economic migrants and Albania as a safe country.
