= British Iraqis =

Total population
- Iraqi-born residents in the United Kingdom: 93,285 (2021/22 census) (Note: Does not include ethnic Iraqis born in the United Kingdom or those with Iraqi ancestry); England: 86,229 (2021); Scotland: 3,683 (2022); Wales: 3,164 (2021); Northern Ireland: 209 (2021); Previous estimates: 32,236 (2001 census); 75,295 (2011 censuses for England & Wales, Scotland, and Northern Ireland combined); 58,000 (2020 ONS estimate); Other estimates 350,000–450,000 (2007 Iraqi embassy estimate)

Regions with significant populations
- London, Birmingham, Manchester, Cardiff and Glasgow

Languages
- Mesopotamian Arabic and British English, also Kurdish (Sorani, Feyli and Kurmanji dialects), Turkish (Iraqi Turkmen/Turkoman dialects), and Neo-Aramaic (Suret, and Mandaic)

Religion
- Islam (Shia and Sunni), Christianity (Syriac Christianity and Eastern Catholicism), Mandaeism, Judaism

Related ethnic groups
- Arab British, Iraqi Americans, Iraqi Australians British Assyrians, British Iranian, Lebanese British, British Jews, Turkish British

British Iraqis are British citizens who originate from Iraq.

== History ==
The UK has had a significant multi ethnic and multi religious Iraqi population since the late 1940s. Refugees including liberal and radical intellectuals dissatisfied with the monarchist regime moved to the UK at this time. Supporters of the monarchy subsequently fled to the UK after it was overthrown. According to an International Organization for Migration mapping exercise, many settled Iraqi migrants in the UK moved for educational purposes or to seek a better life in the 1950s and 1960s. Some members of religious minorities were also forced to leave Iraq in the 1950s. Other Iraqis migrated to the UK to seek political asylum during the dictatorship of Saddam Hussein, with large number of Kurds and Shi'a Muslims in particular migrating in the 1970s and 1980s, or as a result of the instability that followed the 2003 invasion of Iraq.

In the six-year period between 2018 and 2023, 15,392 Iraqi nationals entered the United Kingdom by crossing the English Channel using small boats – the third most common nationality of all small boat arrivals.

== Demographics ==
=== Population size ===
The 2001 UK census recorded 32,236 Iraqi-born residents. The 2011 UK census recorded 70,426 Iraqi-born residents in England, 2,548 in Wales, 2,246 in Scotland and 75 in Northern Ireland. The Office for National Statistics estimates that, as of 2020, the UK-wide figure was around 58,000.

According to estimates by the Iraqi embassy in 2007, the Iraqi population in the UK was around 350,000–450,000. At the time of the Iraqi parliamentary election in January 2005, the International Herald Tribune suggested that 250,000 Iraqi exiles were living in the UK, with an estimated 150,000 eligible to vote.

=== Population distribution ===
According to community leaders in March 2007, there are around 150,000 Iraqis in London, 35,000 in Birmingham, 18,000 in Manchester, 8,000 in Cardiff and 5,000 in Glasgow.

=== Ethnicity ===
According to the International Organization for Migration, the four largest ethnic groups in the British Iraqi community are Arabs, Iraqi Kurds, Assyrians and Iraqi Turkmen. In particular, the Kurds form the most numerous of these ethnic groups. Moreover, they also form the largest Kurdish community in the UK, exceeding the numbers from Turkey and Iran.

There are also sizeable numbers of Assyrians, Armenians, Mandaeans and other ethnic groups, such as Iraqi Jews, Yezidi, Shabakis and Kawliya.

According to the 2011 census, Iraqi-born England and Wales residents most commonly gave their ethnicity as Arab (39%), "any other ethnic group" (28%) and Asian (17%).

=== Religion ===
Although the majority of Iraqis are Muslim (Shia and Sunni), there are also significant minority religions including Christians (largely the exclusively Christian Assyrians and Armenians), Jews, and followers of Mandaeism, Yazidism, Shabakism and Yarsan.

== Notable individuals ==
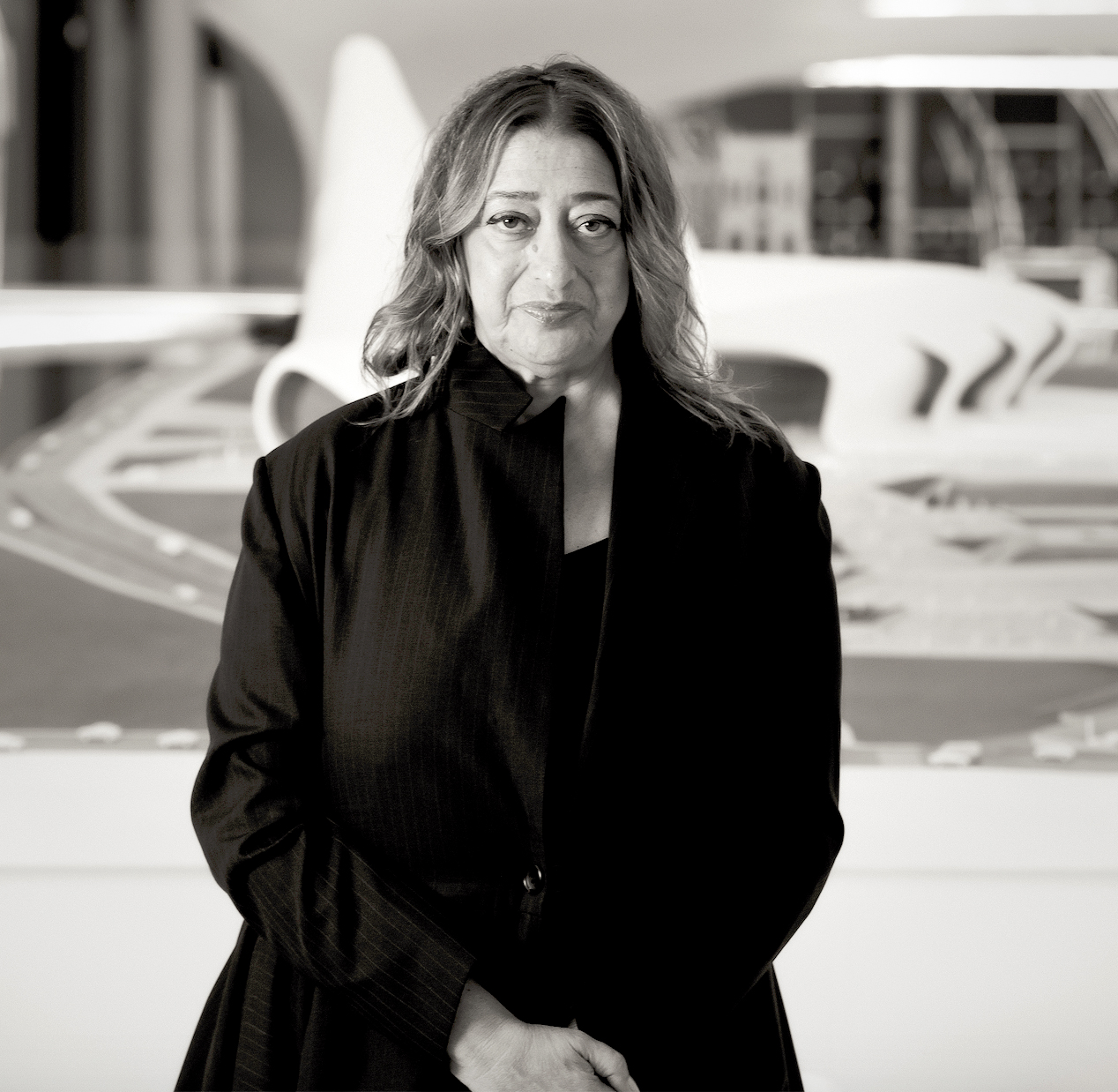
Dame Zaha Hadid DBE RA, British-Iraqi architect.

Notable Iraqi names in Britain include:

- Labour MP for North Somerset, Sadik Al-Hassan
- Former Conservative MP and Chancellor of the Exchequer Nadhim Zahawi,
- Actor, producer and director Andy Serkis,
- Mothercare founder Selim Zilkha,
- Advertising agents Saatchi & Saatchi,
- Architect Dame Zaha Hadid (DBE, RA),
- Broadcaster Alan Yentob,
- Theoretical physicist Jim Al-Khalili (OBE)
- Hip hop artist Lowkey
- Former Iraqi Prime Minister Haider al-Abadi
- 19th century Assyrian Archaeologist Hormuzd Rassam
- The billionaire founder of Investcorp, Nemir Kirdar, and his daughter, the author and socialite, Rena Kirdar Sindi.

== See also ==
- Iraq-United Kingdom relations
- British Arabs
- British Assyrians
- British Kurds
- British Turks
- Iraqi people
