= Privilege Style =

Spanish airline

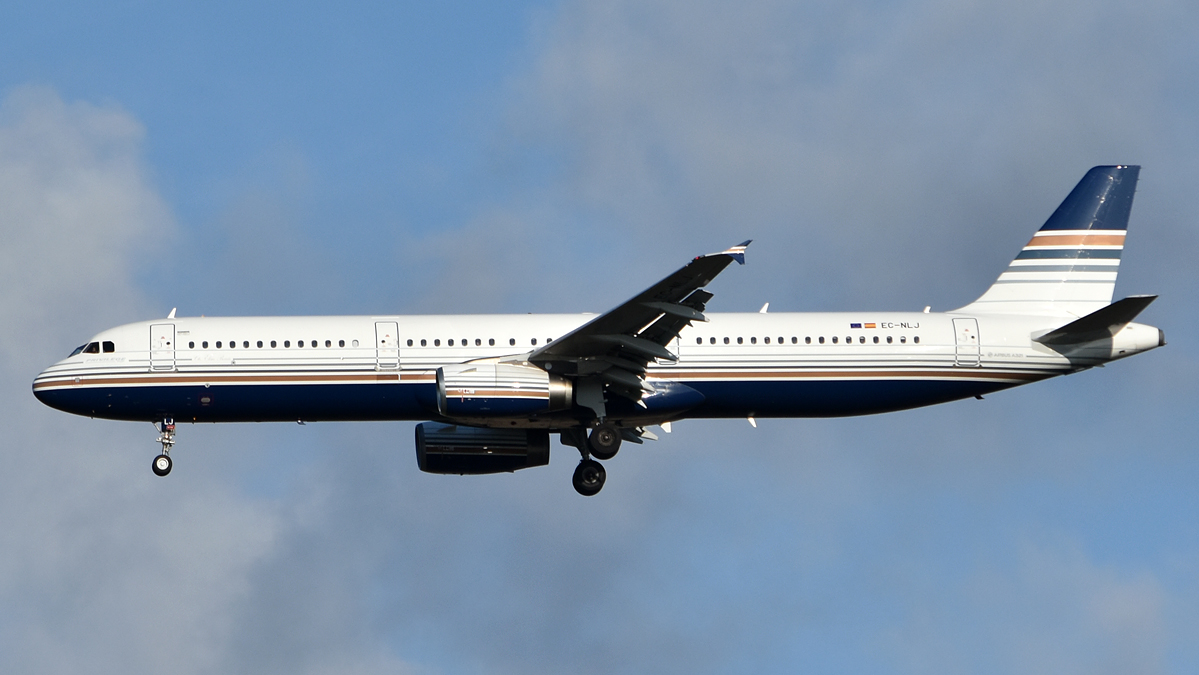
- Airbus A321
IATA	ICAO	Call sign
P6	PVG	PRIVILEGE
- Founded: 2003; 23 years ago
- Hubs: Adolfo Suárez Madrid–Barajas Airport
- Fleet size: 5
- Destinations: Charter
- Headquarters: Palma de Mallorca, Spain
- Website: privilegestyle.com

Privilege Style is a Spanish charter airline headquartered in Palma de Mallorca and based at Adolfo Suárez Madrid–Barajas Airport.

== Operations ==
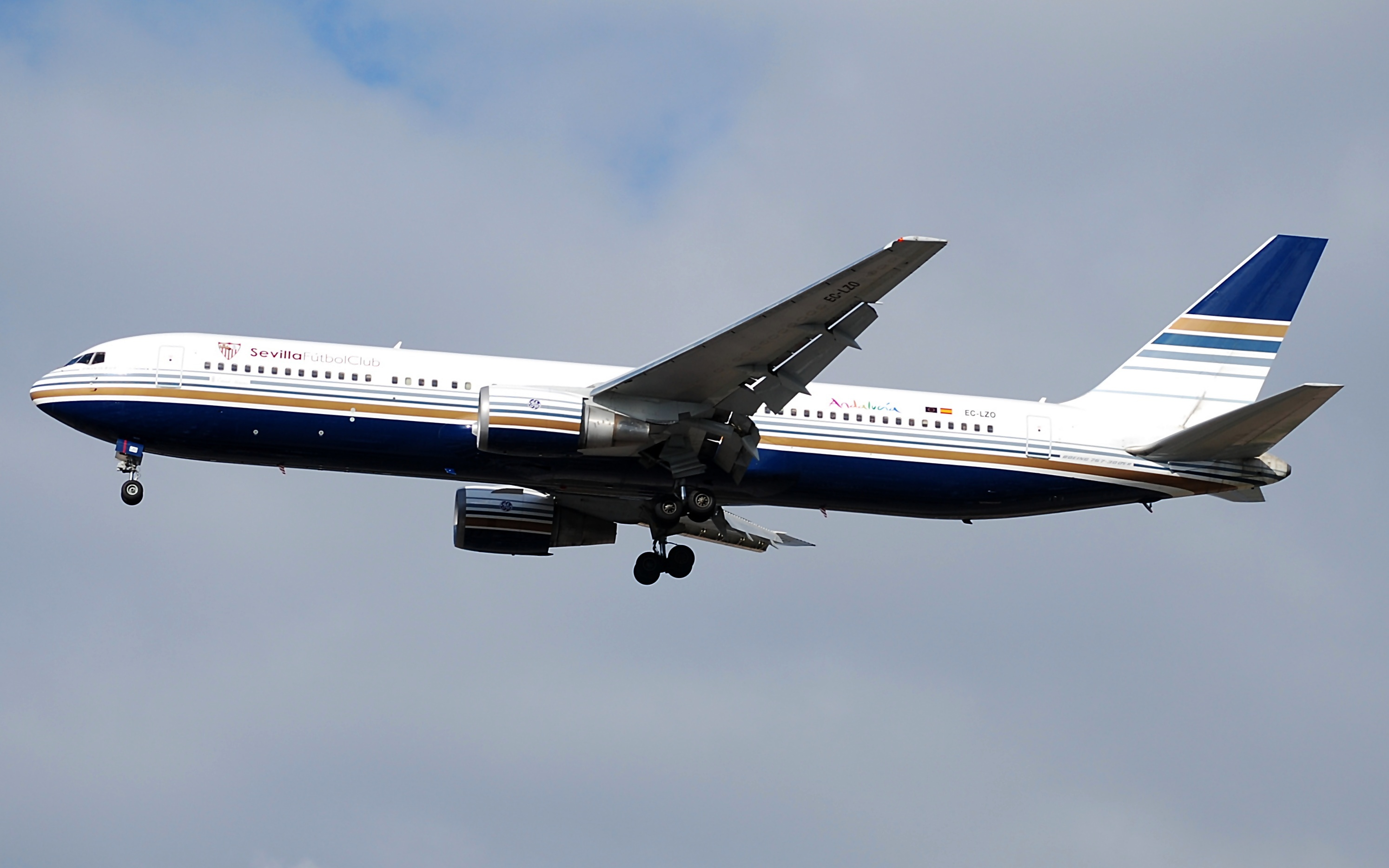
A former Privilege Style Boeing 767-300ER in 2015.

According to the airline, its VIP customers include several Spanish companies and also teams from Spain's first football league. In June and July 2014, Privilege Style operated Finnair's flights from Helsinki to New York while one of Finnair's Airbus A330s was out of service for extended maintenance. The same happened again in December 2015. In the summer of 2015, the airline leased its Boeing 767-300ER to El Al. As of June 2016, all of Privilege Style's aircraft were operating for El Al, except the 767 which was operating for Condor Flugdienst.

In 2018, the Boeing 777 has been operated daily for Norwegian Air Shuttle on their since terminated Rome-Newark route, due to major technical issues affecting Norwegian’s 787 fleet. In late spring 2019, Norwegian again started using Privilege Style's 777 for its London-Miami route. In November 2019, Surinam Airways started using Privilege Style's 777 for their Paramaribo to Amsterdam route, after they had to suddenly retire their only long-haul plane, an Airbus A340.

In February 2021, Privilege Style introduced the Airbus A321 into its fleet.

The company was scheduled to undertake a deportation flight of asylum seekers from the United Kingdom to Rwanda on 14 June 2022 although this never went ahead due to legal challenges. After pressure from various campaign groups, in October 2022 the company announced that it would not carry out any future deportation flights between the two countries.

In June 2023, an Airbus A330 previously operated by Virgin Australia was added to the fleet as a replacement for the Boeing 767.

In November 2025, Privilege Style began operating wet-lease services for LOT Polish Airlines using its Boeing 777-200ER. The aircraft has been deployed on the airline's Warsaw – New York (JFK) route six times per week under an ACMI agreement.

== Fleet ==
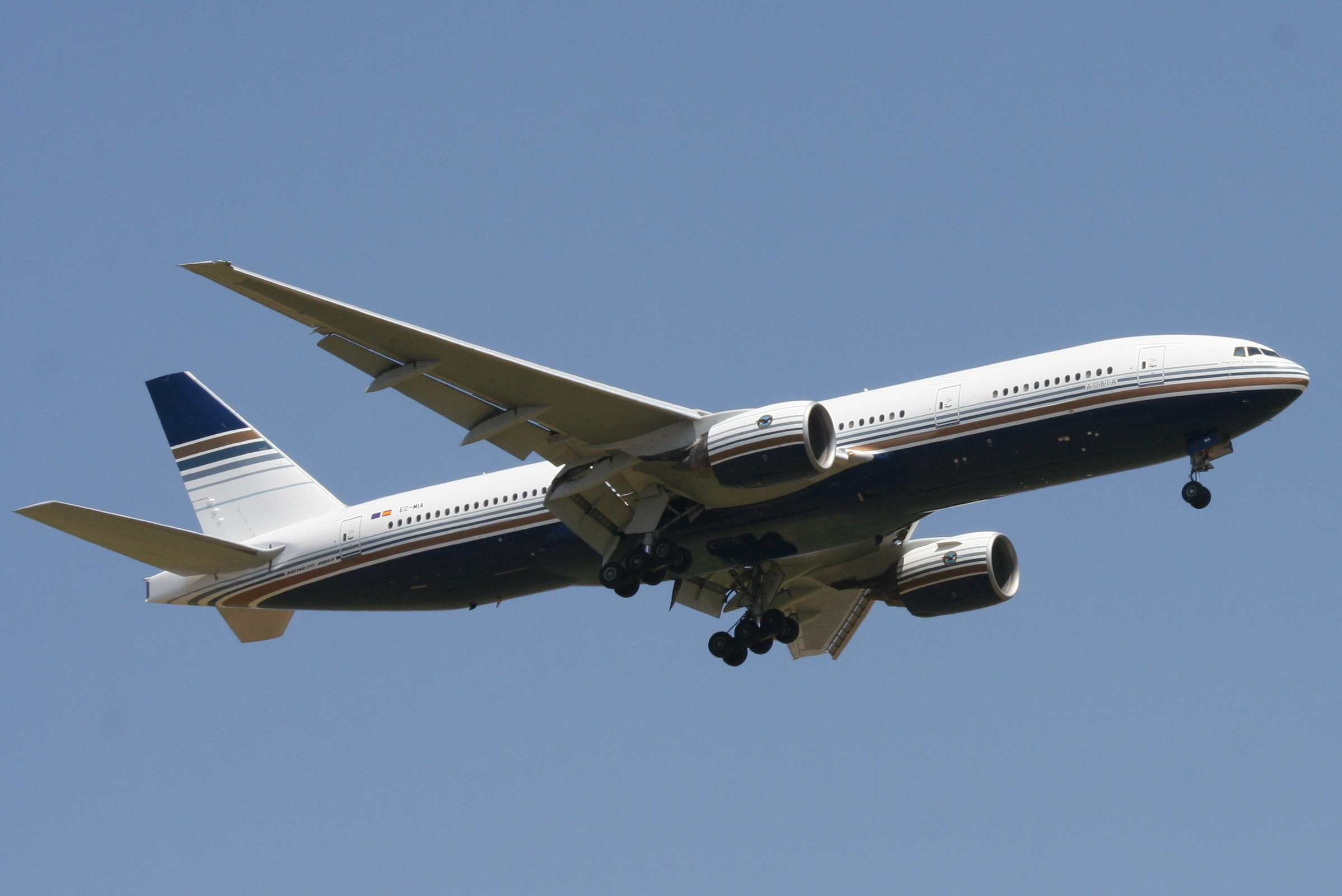
Privilege Style Boeing 777-200ER

As of August 2025, Privilege Style operates the following aircraft:

Privilege Style fleet
Aircraft	In Service	Orders	Passengers			
Aircraft	In Service	Orders	C	W	Y	Total
Airbus A321-200	2	—	—	—	214	214
Airbus A330-200	1	—	20	—	255	275
Airbus A330-200F	1	—	—			
Boeing 777-200ER	1	1	26	40	246	312
Total	4	1				

=== Former fleet ===
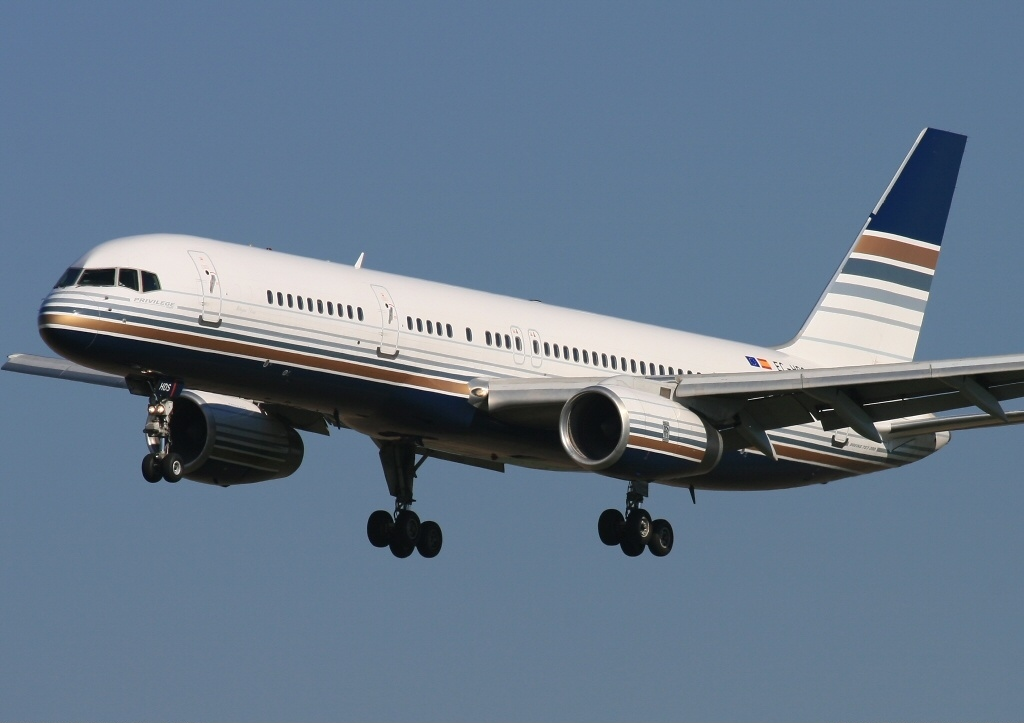
Former Boeing 757

Privilege Style previously operated these aircraft:

Aircraft	In service	Introduced	Retired	Ref
Boeing 757-200	2	2003	2023	
Boeing 767-300	1	2013	2022	
Embraer ERJ 145	1	2012	2017	
