= British Assyrians =

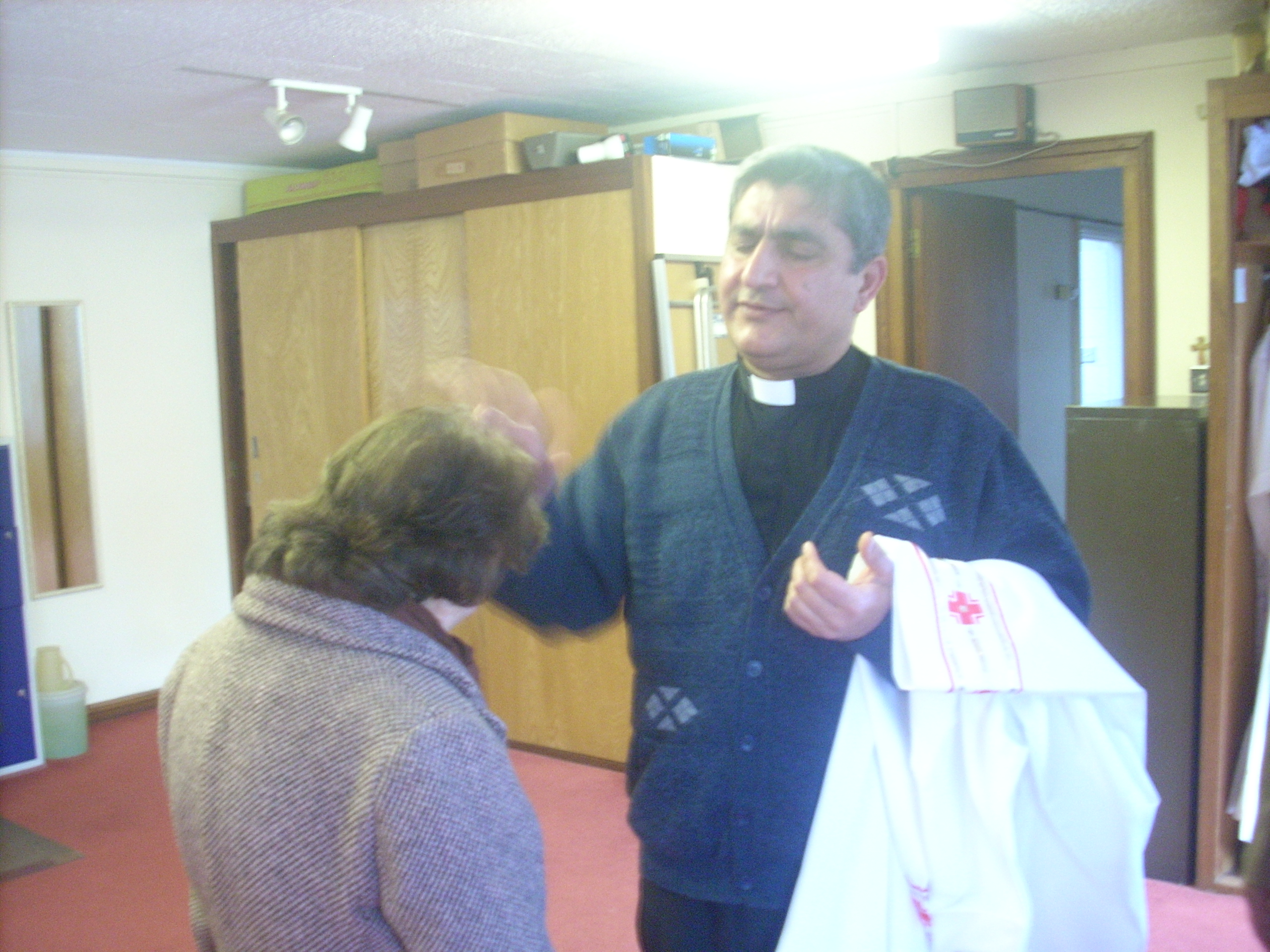
- Fr Habib, the Chaldean Catholic Priest in London

Total population
- 3,000-4,000

Regions with significant populations
- London

Languages
- English; Syriac-Aramaic

Religion
- Christianity (majority: Syriac Christianity; minority: Protestantism)

British Assyrians are British people of Assyrian descent or Assyrians who have British citizenship.

They are the indigenous population of present-day Iraq, southeast Turkey, northwestern Iran and northeast Syria, descended from the ancient Mesopotamians. They speak Syriac and are predominantly Christian.

Concentrations of Assyrians are found in Greenford and in Hanwell, both towns within the London Borough of Ealing. Assyrians in the UK and other western countries mostly migrated from Iran, Iraq, Turksy and Syria. Migration was largely triggered by long standing ethnic and religious persecution in their homeland.

== Religious institutions ==
This is the Latin rite Church used by the Chaldean Catholics.

A Chaldean Catholic Church is rented in Acton, London. The Assyrian Church of the East have its own church, The Ancient Church of the East rent a hall and one Club exist are owned by the Assyrians in South Ealing. The priest of the Chaldean Church is currently Father Habib al-Noufaly. The former Chaldean priest was Father Andreas, now a bishop, ordained in Rome by the Pope in 2004.

== Immigration history ==
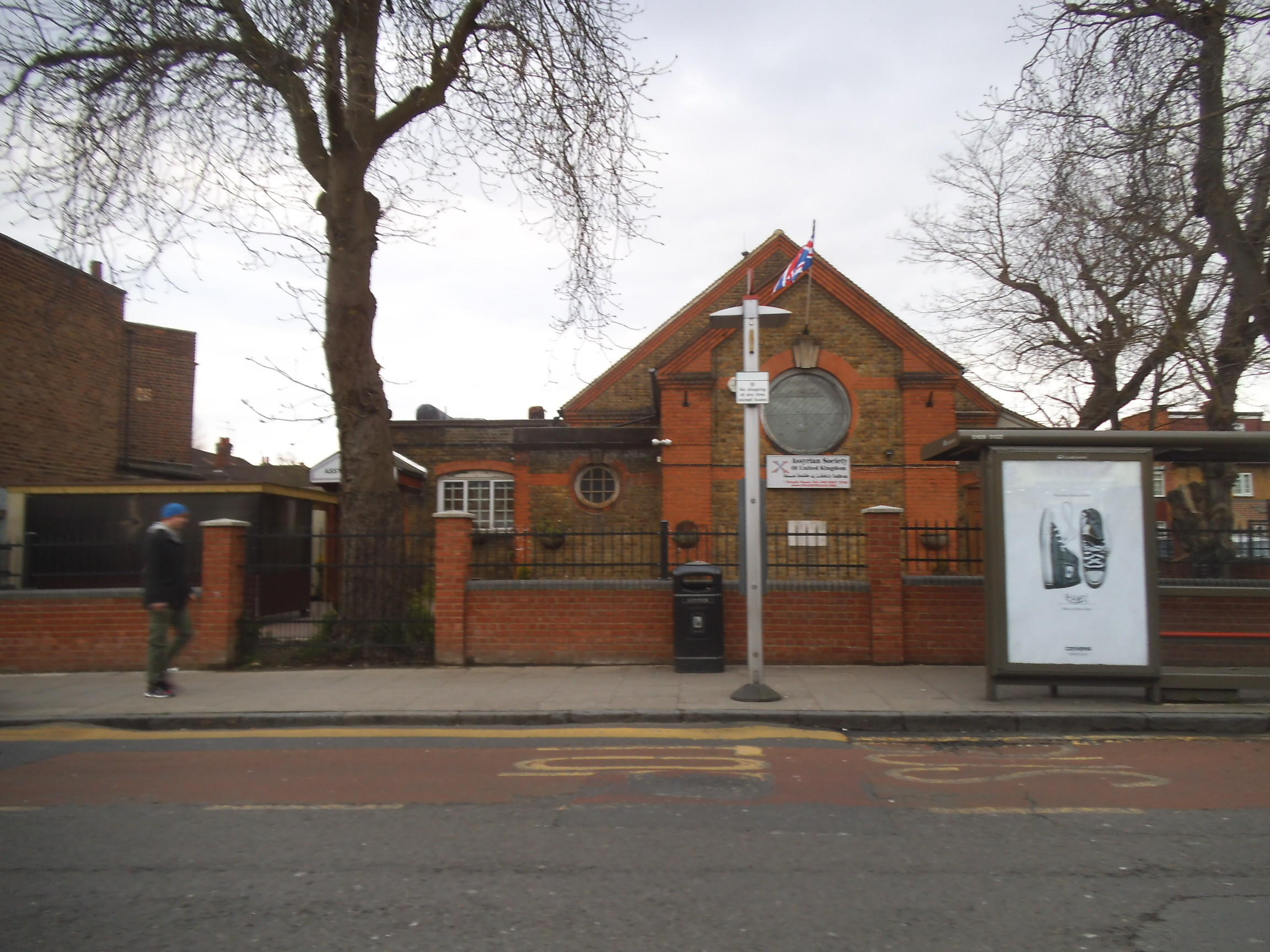
The Assyrian Society of the United Kingdom in Ealing, London

The earliest recorded Assyrian in the UK was Hormuzd Rassam the famed archaeologist and politician. He became a diplomat in the UK in the mid-19th century and settled in Brighton. The theologian Louis Cheikho spent time in the United Kingdom in the late 19th century also. The theologian and orientalist Alphonse Mingana was also a notable early arrival in the Edwardian period. Assyrians have traditionally migrated to Britain from their ancestral homelands in northern Iraq, south eastern Turkey, north eastern Syria and north western Iran.

=== Modern times ===
Many more Assyrians fled Iraq for the UK during the rule of the Baathist regime from 1963 to 2003 due to racial persecution, the Baathist Arabs pursuing a policy of forced Arabisation upon the Pre-Arab Assyrians, together with bouts of ethnic cleansing and forced relocations. A further influx occurred as a result of the al-Anfal Campaign against Iraqi minorities in the 1980s, and again after the Gulf War (1990–91).

Following the Invasion of Iraq in 2003, more Assyrians fled to the UK in the face of increased religious and ethnic persecution from Arab Islamists and Kurdish Nationalists, including bombing of churches, random killings, violent harassment, death threats and kidnappings.

In recent years, the Assyrians have received support from a number of parliamentarians, in particular MP Steven Pound of Ealing and Lord Hylton. Issues raised included the racial and religious persecution of Assyrians by both Kurds and Arabs, and a brief outline of their history since the "Great Game". Assyrians received increased media coverage with the kidnapping and death of a Chaldean Catholic Bishop in Iraq.

Other groups of Assyrians have fled Iran due to religious persecution, Syria and northern Iraq due to ethnic discrimination and the recent civil war, where they are violently targeted for ethnic cleansing by the Islamists of ISIL, and also Turkey due to both ethnic and religious discrimination.

Assyrians in London have formed a football club, FC Ealing Assyrians.

== See also ==
- Assyrian diaspora
- British Iraqis
