= Eritrea–United Kingdom relations =

- Eritrea: United Kingdom

Diplomatic mission
- The Embassy of the State of Eritrea in London: British Embassy Asmara

Envoy
- Chargé d'Affaires Salih Abdalla: Chargé d'Affaires (ad interim) David McIlroy

Eritrea–United Kingdom relations are bilateral relations between Eritrea and the United Kingdom.

== History ==
Following the defeat of Italian forces in East Africa during World War II, Eritrea came under British administration as a United Nations trust territory from 1942 to 1952.

The British Embassy Asmara opened in March 2002.

== See also ==
- Eritreans in the United Kingdom
- Foreign relations of Eritrea
- Foreign relations of the United Kingdom
