= United Kingdom–France one in, one out plan =

2025 migration agreement

The United Kingdom–France one in, one out plan, known internally as Operation Hillmore, is an agreement between the United Kingdom and France aimed at reducing unauthorised migration across the English Channel into the United Kingdom. Formalised in August 2025, the plan states that migrants that arrive illegally by small boats to the UK can be sent back to France. In return the UK will take the same number of migrants from France who have not tried to cross the Channel before and pass security and eligibility checks.

== Overview ==
Cross Channel migration has been a major problem for both the United Kingdom and France in recent years. As of 19 January 2026, the Home Office has detected 193,543 migrants who have crossed the English Channel in small boats since 2018. Crossing the Channel without permission is a criminal offence under UK law, as is to attempt to use a dangerous type of vessel or any unregistered craft under French law. The plan was part of a larger plan by the Labour government to replace the cancelled Rwanda asylum plan and strengthen border security, while also providing safe and controlled ways for people to come to the UK, with first test phases of 50 migrants per week. The 'one in, one out' migrant agreement was announced on 10 July 2025, by UK Prime Minister Keir Starmer and French President Emmanuel Macron, with Starmer stating that the deal would begin within weeks. In early September 2025, it was reported that 3,567 people had arrived on the UK's shores since the deal with France was ratified in August, however returns had not yet commenced.

== Method of operation ==
The formal agreement was approved by both governments early in August 2025 with support of the European Commission and other EU countries. The plan's first phase permits the UK to send back about 50 undocumented migrants per week, with no family ties, that arrived in small boats. In return it will take in 50 asylum seekers from France, who either have proven family in the UK or come from a country with a high chance of getting asylum, like Afghanistan or Iran. If the first phase is successful, the numbers will increase.

== Reception ==
The plan has received mixed reactions. The UN refugee agency (UNHCR) and some experts said it could be a sign of better cooperation between the UK and the EU, but they also stated that its impact may be small because only a limited number of people—about 50 per week—are involved. Some UK opposition leaders, including members of the Conservative Party, say the plan deals with only a small part of the issue, as more than 25,000 people are expected to arrive by small boats in 2025. They have called for stronger actions, like bringing back the Rwanda asylum plan. The Home Secretary has refused to share exact targets, saying that doing so could help smugglers change their methods.

== Protests and legal challenge ==
On 15 September 2025, the first 'one in, one out' migrant flight, which was due to fly one migrant from London to Paris on an Air France flight, was cancelled due to threats of legal action. On 16 September 2025, deportation flights were cancelled again due to legal challenges. Further that day it was reported that a 25-year-old Eritrean asylum seeker who had arrived on a small boat on 12 August 2025, would not be deported as planned on the 17 September, after he won his High Court bid to have the removal temporarily blocked.

== Results ==
The first return, of an Indian national, happened on 18 September 2025. The first migrants to be accepted by the UK in return from France were a family of three on 24 September 2025, at which point a total of four migrants had been sent from the UK to France. By 30 June 2026, 1,087 migrants had been sent from the UK to France under the scheme and 1,117 migrants had been sent from France to the UK. One man who had been sent to France under the scheme returned on a small boat to the UK, but was removed again within a month of his second arrival. By 30 June 2026, nearly 50 migrants sent from the UK to France had returned to the UK; the treaty governing the scheme was amended to allowed for their return to France.

== Cancellation ==
In September 2026, the British Government announced that the scheme would be scrapped due to not reaching a large enough scale.

== See also ==
- One in, one out policy
- English Channel illegal migrant crossings (2018–present)
- 2025 UK refugee plan
