= ISU (trade union) =

British trade union

- Formation: 1981; 45 years ago
- Type: Trade union
- Location: United Kingdom
- Members: ▼3,976 (2024)
- General Secretary: Mark Gribbin
- Website: theisu.co.uk
- Formerly called: Immigration Services Union

The ISU is a British trade union representing some of the operational staff in the borders, customs and immigration functions of the Home Office.

The union was founded in 1981 as the Immigration Service Union. It was a split from the Society of Civil and Public Servants (SCPS), founded in protest at the SCPS calling for the repeal of the Immigration Act 1971.

The ISU is politically independent and not a member of the Trades Union Congress. PCS, the SCPS's successor, sees ISU as a yellow union, as some senior managers encouraged its splitting off, although its independence has been certified by the Certification Officer.

Membership of the union reached 4,263 in 2006, but, in common with all Civil Service unions, fell after the ending of payroll wage check-off (subscriptions automatically deducted where workers have ticked to confirm they wish to be in any recognised union to their employer) in 2015. It declined to 3,018 in that year. In 2020, membership stood at 3,043. By 2022, ISU membership stood at 3,803.

The ISU does not generally take industrial action. In 2012, ISU members followed other public sector unions in agreeing to strike against changes to civil service pensions.

== General Secretaries ==
- 1981: P. J. Taylor
- 1997: Martin Slade
- 2003: Peter Stowe
- 2010: Paul Duckhouse
- 2013: Lucy Moreton
- 2019: Mark Gribbin
