= Rwanda asylum plan =

British former immigration policy

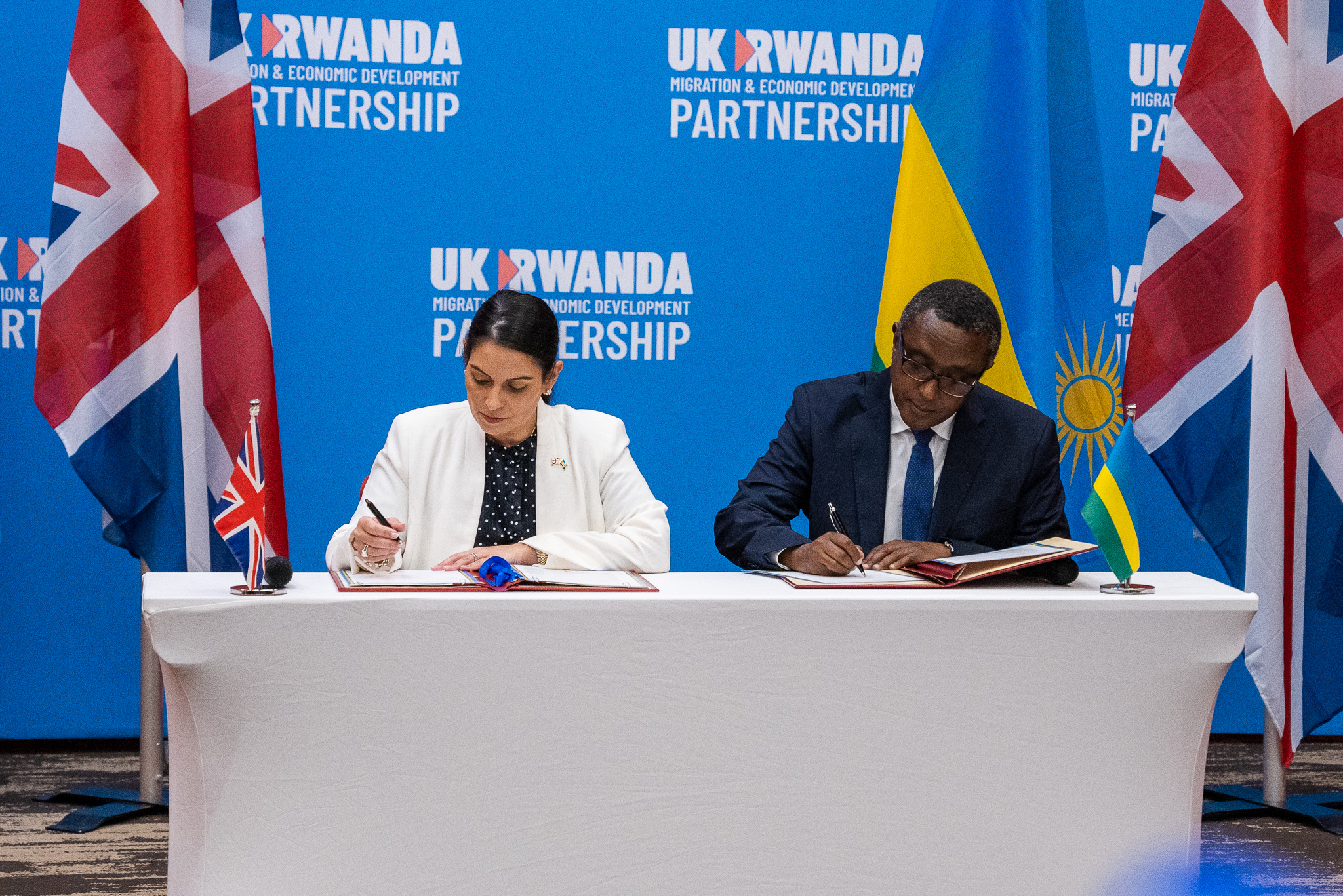
British home secretary Priti Patel (left) and Rwandan foreign minister Vincent Biruta (right) sign the policy on 14 April 2022.

The UK and Rwanda Migration and Economic Development Partnership (Note: Also known as the Rwanda asylum plan, Rwanda asylum scheme, Rwanda plan or Rwanda deal.) was an immigration policy proposed by the governments of Boris Johnson, Liz Truss and Rishi Sunak whereby people whom the United Kingdom identified as illegal immigrants or asylum seekers would have been relocated to Rwanda for processing, asylum and resettlement. Those who were successful in claiming asylum would have remained in Rwanda, and they would not have been permitted to return to the United Kingdom. The UK would invest in a development fund for Rwanda and financially support migrants' relocation and accommodation costs to move to Rwanda.

The first flight for this plan received legal clearance from the High Court of Justice and was scheduled for 14 June 2022. A last-minute interim measure by the European Court of Human Rights led to the plan being halted until the conclusion of the legal action in the UK. At the end of 2022, the High Court further ruled that though the plan was lawful, the individual cases of eight asylum seekers due to be deported that year had to be reconsidered. The Court of Appeal ruled on 29 June 2023 that the plan was unlawful; with an appeal to the Supreme Court of the United Kingdom leading to a concurrence with the lower court on 15 November 2023. The Safety of Rwanda (Asylum and Immigration) Act 2024 overruled the courts' judgments and declared Rwanda a safe country.

After Keir Starmer and the Labour Party won the 2024 general election, Starmer announced that the Rwanda plan would be cancelled and replaced by the Border Security Command. The total cost of the scheme is estimated to be £700 million; four migrants were voluntarily relocated while it was in place.

== Description ==
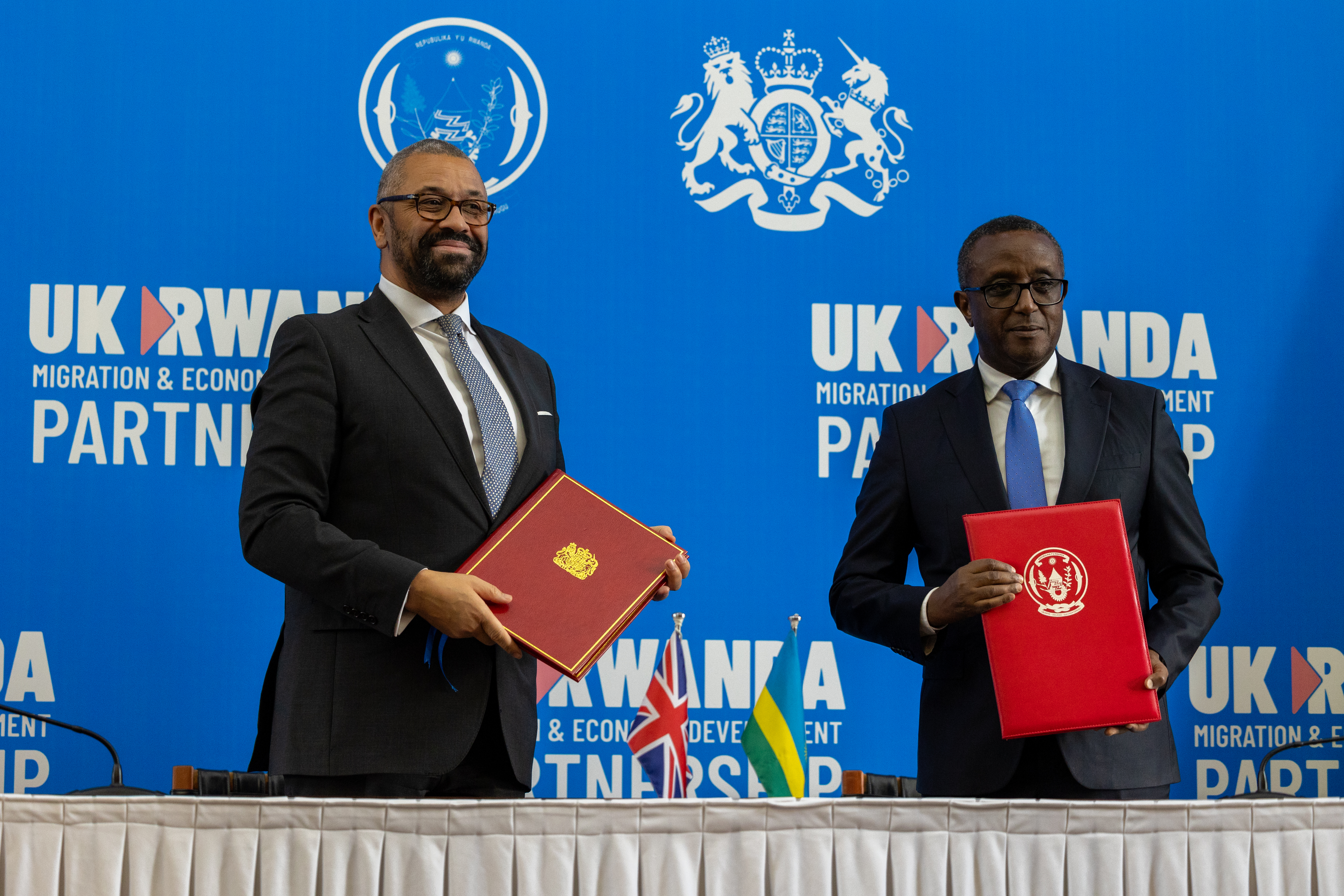
UK Home Secretary James Cleverly with Rwandan Foreign Secretary Vincent Biruta in December 2023, after signing a new treaty related to the asylum plan

The UK and Rwanda Migration and Economic Development Partnership, also known as the Rwanda asylum plan, was a policy that was announced in a speech by British prime minister Boris Johnson on 14 April 2022. It was an immigration policy whereby people identified by the United Kingdom as being illegal immigrants or asylum seekers would have been relocated to Rwanda for processing, asylum and resettlement. In return, the United Kingdom was set to accept an unspecified number of the "most vulnerable refugees" currently residing in Rwanda. It was signed for a duration of five years by British home secretary Priti Patel and Rwandan foreign minister Vincent Biruta on 13 April 2022. Its stated aims were to decrease the number of migrant crossings in the English channel, stop human smuggling, and boost Rwandan investment and development.

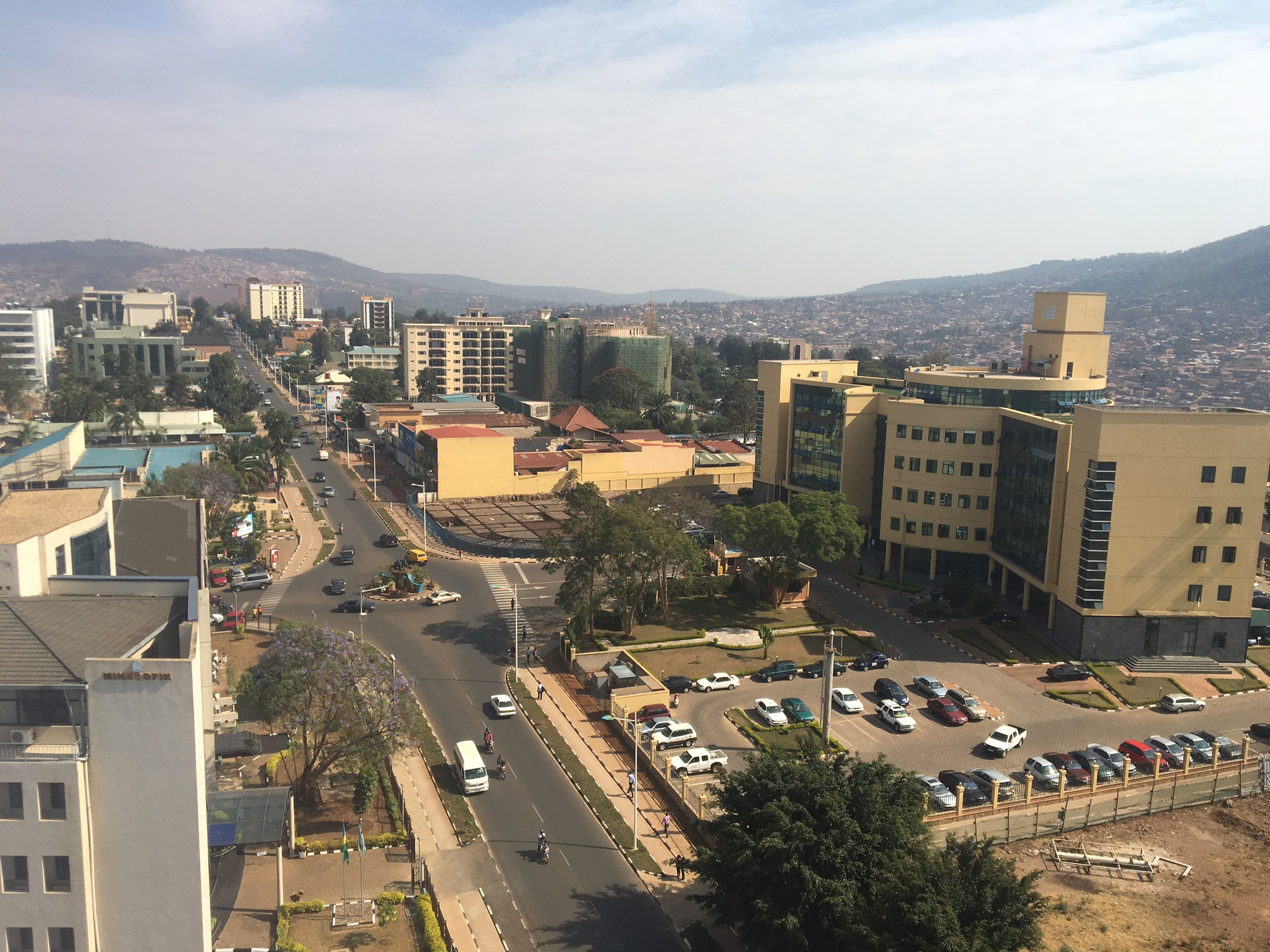
Kigali, Rwanda's capital, where asylum seekers would have been relocated

Johnson said it would "save countless lives" and would break the business model of "vile people smugglers". The United Kingdom would have paid Rwanda an "economic transformation and integration fund" amounting to £120 million, and would also have funded each immigrant in an amount of between £20,000 and £30,000 for their relocation and temporary accommodation under the scheme. The agreement with the Rwandan government did not specify how many migrants would have been accepted under the scheme and it was reported that a facility was already available that could hold 200 immigrants, and that there was the ability to “scale up very quickly” as necessary. In comparison, the government registered 45,755 people arriving by small boats in 2022, 60% higher than in 2021, according to the Home Office. That has led to a record backlog of 161,000 asylum cases.

Upon their arrival in Rwanda, migrants would have been temporarily accommodated in the capital Kigali while their claims for asylum were processed. If successful, migrants would have then received permanent residency in the country and been offered permanent accommodation. It was expected that all claims would, at most, have taken three months to be processed. Once in Rwanda, migrants would not have been allowed to return to the United Kingdom to seek asylum.

The United Kingdom has stated that asylum in the country would still have been granted on an individual basis, but depending on the strength of each claim. Rwanda stated that they would not accept immigrants with criminal records, nor would it accept families or anyone under the age of majority.

== Application ==
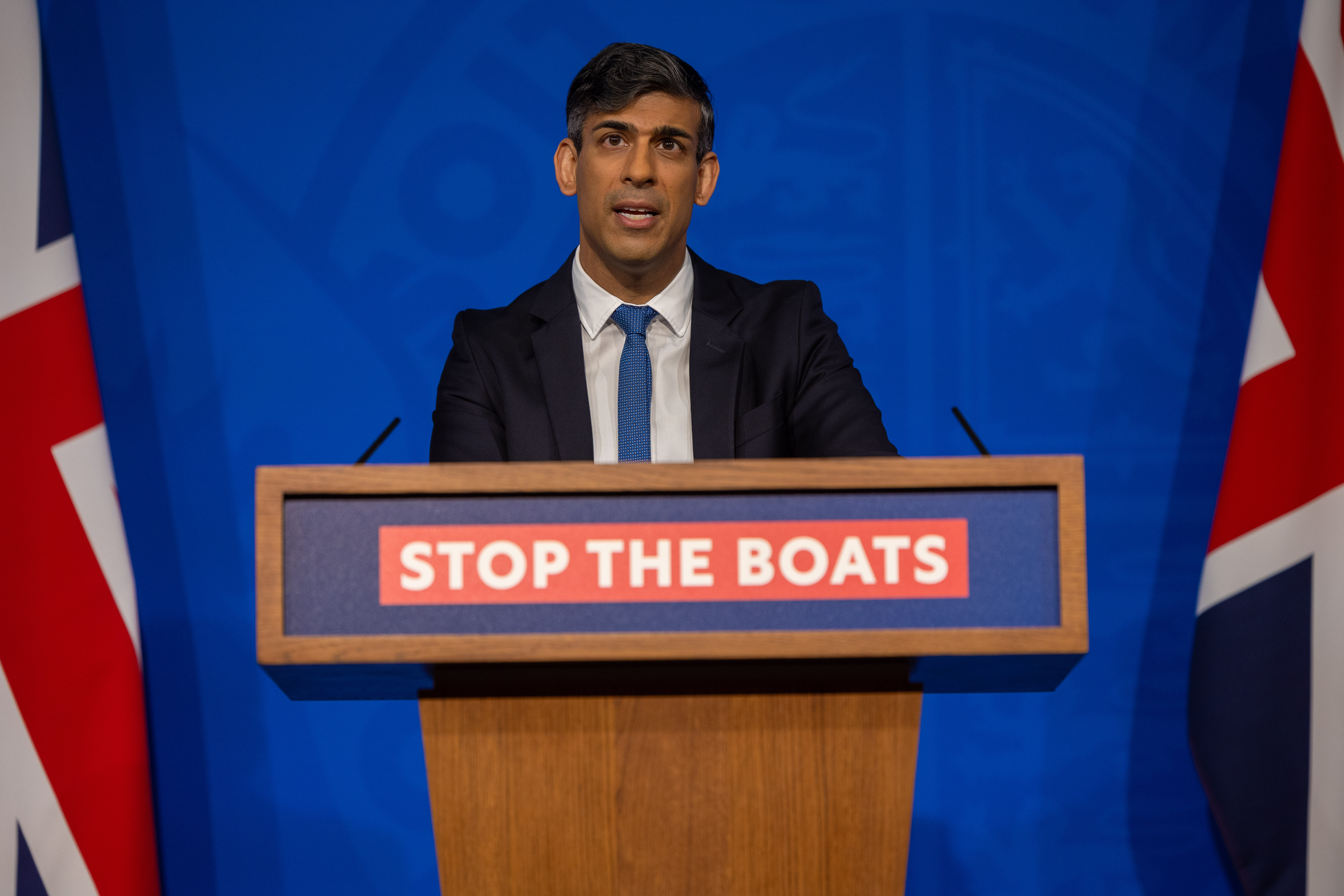
Prime Minister Rishi Sunak holds a press conference on the Rwanda asylum plan, 22 April 2024.

On 14 May 2022, Johnson said in an interview with the Daily Mail that fifty migrants had been told that they would be transported to Rwanda over the next two weeks, and that his government was ready for legal opposition to the plan's enforcement.

The first flight under this plan was scheduled for 14 June 2022, and was expected to carry more than 30 people. By 14 June, the number of people expected on the flight had been reduced to seven after successful legal challenges had removed a number of people from it. On the evening of 14 June it was confirmed the flight would no longer depart on that date following an interim measure from the European Court of Human Rights. Home Secretary Priti Patel said that she was "disappointed" by the outcome and that preparations for "the next flight" were to begin immediately. Liz Truss vowed to expand the scheme during the July–September 2022 Conservative Party leadership election and at the start of her premiership.

Between the agreement being signed in 2022 and the end of 2023, 21 Rwandans were granted asylum in the United Kingdom.

In April 2024, after the Safety of Rwanda Act removed legal impediments to the scheme, the Home Office launched raids to detain asylum seekers across the UK in preparation for their deportation. A minority of those on the list of 5,700 earmarked as the first cohort for deportation were successfully located for detention.

In April 2024, a separate voluntary removal programme was launched and one asylum seeker whose asylum claim was unsuccessful was paid £3,000 and sent to Rwanda under the voluntary programme.

On 1 May 2024, it was reported that the FDA, the union representing senior civil servants, had launched legal action against the scheme. The FDA was concerned that, because the scheme allows ministers to ignore the European Court of Human Rights, the FDA's members would be forced to violate international law and therefore the Civil Service Code.

== Legal challenge ==
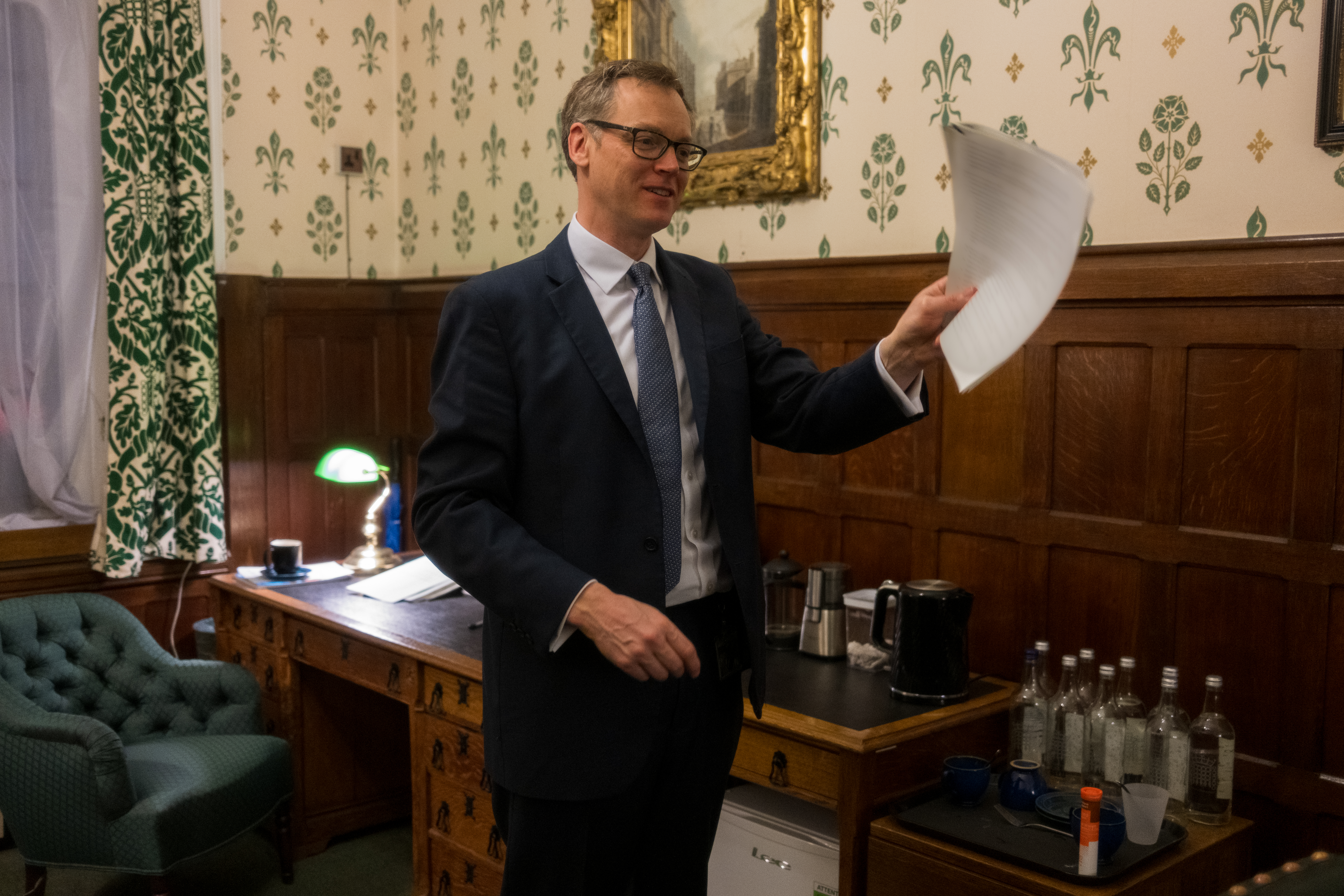
Minister for Countering Illegal Migration Michael Tomlinson during the signing of the Safety of Rwanda (Asylum and Immigration) Bill

Two campaign groups – Detention Action and Care4Calais – joined the Public and Commercial Services Union (PCS) and four asylum seekers to challenge the plan in the High Court of Justice and request a last-minute injunction to stop the first flight from taking off on 14 June 2022. However, on 10 June 2022 the High Court refused to grant the injunction requested.

At 19:30 on the day of the planned flight, the European Court of Human Rights issued an interim measure which stated that one of its seven passengers, an Iraqi man, would face "a real risk of irreversible harm" if he was transported to Rwanda. That interim measure led the other six passengers to appeal, some to judges in London. The removal orders were scrapped and the flight was cancelled. After the ECHR intervention, some political figures called for the UK to leave the ECHR.

On 19 December 2022, the High Court of Justice ruled that the plan to send asylum seekers to Rwanda was lawful. However, a group of asylum seekers selected for deportation appealed the case to the Court of Appeal, which on 29 June 2023 ruled that the plan was unlawful because Rwanda is not a safe country. Prime Minister Rishi Sunak vowed to appeal the verdict at the Supreme Court of the United Kingdom.

The government subsequently launched its planned appeal against the ruling. The Supreme Court scheduled a three-day hearing on the policy to begin on 9 October 2023. During the hearing, the government argued that Rwanda could be trusted to treat refugees humanely, while the lawyers representing the migrants described the country as an "authoritarian one-party state" with a "woefully deficient" asylum system. In a unanimous ruling the court agreed with the Court of Appeal's decision, finding the plan unlawful on the grounds of deficiencies in Rwanda's asylum system.

After concluding a new treaty with Rwanda on 5 December 2023, on 7 December the government introduced the Safety of Rwanda (Asylum and Immigration) Act 2024, which was passed on 23 April 2024 after many rounds of "parliamentary ping-pong." The Act overrules the judgments and declares Rwanda a safe country.

The ECHR intervention under their "Rule 39" has been described as an example of a pyjama injunction.

== Cancellation ==
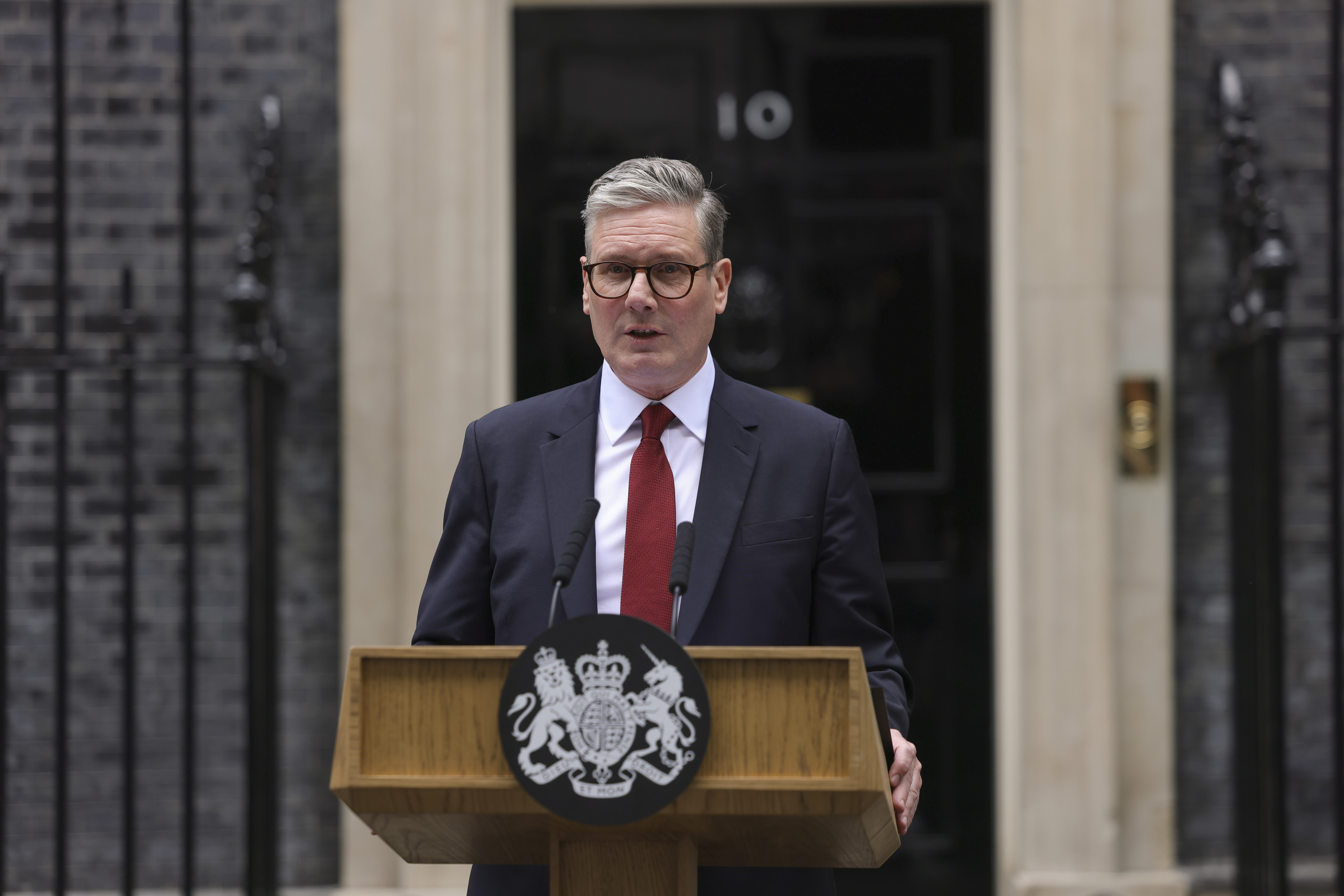
Keir Starmer announced the cancellation of the scheme shortly after becoming prime minister in July 2024.

After calling the 2024 general election, Sunak stated that no deportation flights would take place before the election, but that they would take place if the Conservative Party were re-elected. Keir Starmer, leader of the Labour Party, pledged to end the scheme if elected. Following Labour's victory in the election, Starmer confirmed that he would scrap the Rwanda scheme, saying it was "dead and buried before it started", and would be replaced by the Border Security Command. In August 2025, Starmer's government announced the United Kingdom–France one in, one out plan as part of a larger plan to replace the Rwanda plan.

The plan is reported to have cost £700 million. Under it, a total of four asylum seekers went to Rwanda, all voluntarily.

During his unsuccessful bid to become Conservative Party leader following the 2024 election, James Cleverly pledged to revive the Rwanda plan if he was elected and the Conservatives returned to government.

On 27 January 2026, Rwanda filed a lawsuit against the United Kingdom in the Permanent Court of Arbitration, seeking £50 million ($68.8 million) in damages from the improper termination of the asylum plan. The court ruled in favour of the UK on 1 June 2026.

== Reception ==
=== United Kingdom ===
A YouGov poll, reported on 14 April 2022, found that 42% of those questioned disagreed with the plan, while 35% were in support. Results differed depending on what political party members of the public supported. The majority of Conservative supporters and Brexiteers agreed with the scheme, whereas the majority of Remainers, Liberal Democrat supporters and Labour supporters were opposed. Labour voters in the Red Wall and Wales were most likely to agree with the policy out of the party's supporters. People in Scotland and London, as well as young people nationwide, opposed the scheme the most. In contrast, the elderly gave it the most support. By 13 June 2022, a YouGov poll reported that 44% of those questioned supported the plan, and that 40% were opposed to it. A further poll by YouGov on 30 June 2023 indicated 42% in support and 39% opposed.

Demonstrations were held outside the Home Office the day the policy was announced and charities warned of Rwanda's human rights violations. The Rwanda deportation flight was to have been carried out by Privilege Style, a Spanish-based charter operator that had previously conducted deportation flights for the Home Office. Seven airline operators have been identified as providing contract services for such flights the previous year. Privilege Style later announced that it would not be making the requested deportation flights due to a campaign by pressure group Freedom from Torture.

As summarised by the Evening Standard on 15 April 2022, the Daily Mirror and The Guardian called the plan "inhumane", while The i called it "cruel", and the Daily Mail called its critics "left-wing lawyers and naysayers".

Home Office under-secretary, Matthew Rycroft was reported on 17 April 2022 to have expressed doubt over whether the plan would deter migrants or provide value for money while Home Secretary Priti Patel said that the prospect of being sent to Rwanda would disrupt the people-smuggling trade. In the following year, other Home Office officials expressed similar doubts about the plan's feasibility.

Archbishop of Canterbury Justin Welby said during an Easter Sunday sermon that the scheme raised "serious ethical questions" and did not stand "the judgement of God".

On 10 June 2022, The Times reported that Prince Charles had privately described the plan as "appalling" and feared that it would overshadow the Commonwealth Heads of Government meeting in Rwanda on 23 June, where the Prince represented the Queen.

On 15 June 2022, in an exchange in the House of Commons, Labour's Yvette Cooper criticised the scheme saying that in the past Rwanda had shot asylum seekers because they protested about food shortages, and had sent asylum seekers back to Syria and Afghanistan. She said Patel was failing to get a better agreement with France to prevent people crossing the Channel because relevant relationships with France broke down.

Speaking to GB News, the former home secretary Amber Rudd described the plan as being "brutal" and "impractical", saying that the UK government should try and improve relations with France to help deal with migrants crossing the English Channel to try and enter the UK.

The Leader of the Opposition and Labour Party Keir Starmer claimed Boris Johnson was using the scheme as a "desperate announcement to distract from his own lawbreaking"; Johnson had been fined the day prior due to his involvement in the Partygate scandal. His party also criticised it as an "unworkable, unethical and extortionate policy that would cost the UK taxpayer billions of pounds during a cost of living crisis". Liberal Democrat leader Ed Davey echoed similar concerns to Starmer. He also criticised the cost of the scheme, expressing his desire for it to be spent towards the cost of living crisis instead. The Scottish National Party responded negatively to the policy, with then-Scottish first minister Nicola Sturgeon calling it "despicable", SNP Commons leader Ian Blackford calling it "evil" and Scottish health secretary Humza Yousaf using it as evidence of institutional racism in the British government.

In April 2024, while the UK aimed to implement its Rwanda asylum policy amidst discussions on reducing net migration, Irish Taoiseach Simon Harris sought legislation to return asylum seekers back to the UK amid a surge in arrivals from the UK via the Irish border. However, then-Tánaiste Micheál Martin argued that the cause of the surge was that migrants, fearful of the UK's new policy, were turning to Ireland to avoid being sent to Rwanda.

=== Rwanda ===
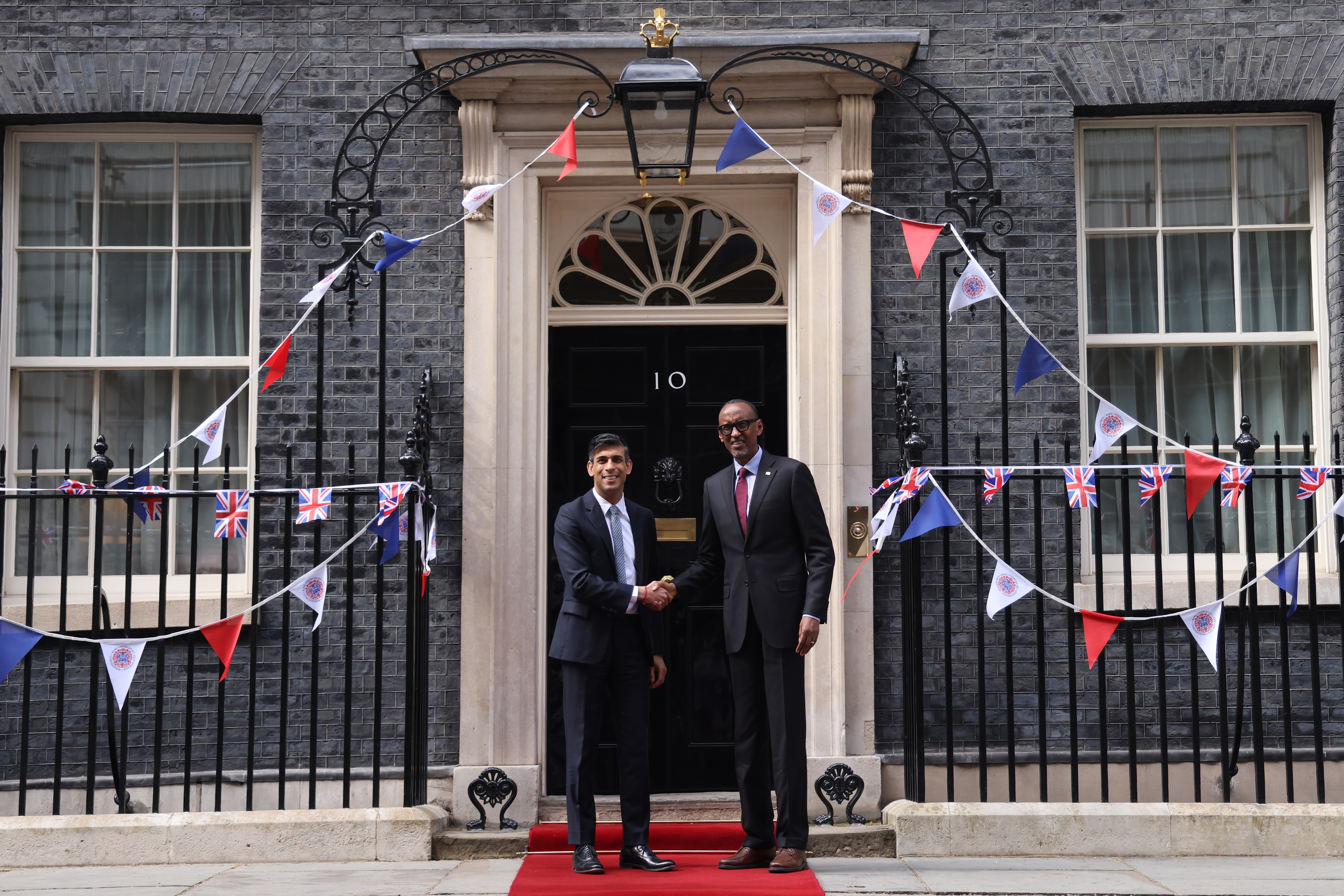
Sunak meeting Paul Kagame outside 10 Downing Street in May 2023

Rwandan President Paul Kagame has defended the asylum plan, dismissing allegations that "the U.K. gave Rwanda money to dump people here," further stating that it was "just a problem that needs to be solved and Rwanda is ready to help". He favourably compared the plan to his 2018 proposal to give asylum to Libyan refugees.

Victoire Ingabire Umuhoza, leader of the opposition in Rwanda, criticised the policy as dealing with British issues where Rwanda's problems should be dealt with first. She also claimed that Rwanda was not prepared for the new immigrants: "If our people don't have enough to eat, if our kids or Rwanda's kids don't have the possibility of going to school because of the poverty, how will the Rwandan government give education to the kids of refugees?"

Bishop Laurent Mbanda, the head of the Anglican Church of Rwanda, supported the plans. He said that the nation's people empathised with refugees due to their own experiences from the 1990s Rwandan genocide.

Vincent Biruta, foreign secretary of Rwanda, supported the policy shortly after its announcement. In a joint news conference with the British home secretary Priti Patel on 14 April 2022, Biruta said that Rwanda will provide the refugees with "a dignified life with shelter, with skills for them to be able to socially and economically integrate into our society, or to have those skills for them to be able to integrate into their country of origin when they decide to go back to their countries". On 4 December 2023 he signed a treaty with British home secretary James Cleverly in an attempt to address the concerns of the Supreme Court of the United Kingdom.

=== International ===
The United Nations High Commissioner for Refugees (UNHCR) is "firmly opposed" to the policy, believing it to be unlawful, prejudiced and impractical. Its assistant high commissioner Gillian Triggs said the United Kingdom was "attempting to shift its burden to a developing country" and that the policy "would not comply with the UK's international legal responsibilities". Triggs has called for more options for legal immigration to be introduced to the United Kingdom.

== Similar plans ==
=== United States ===
In April 2025, Rwanda accepted an Iraqi refugee who was deported from the United States. Neither party released details about this incident. Soon after, in May 2025, Rwanda started official negotiations with the United States to receive more deportees. This came shortly after the Trump administration started to crackdown on illegal immigration and to close down refugee programs. In August 2025, Rwanda agreed to receive up to 250 vetted deportees from the United States. On the same month, the United States government sent a group of 7 deportees to Rwanda. The Rwandan Ministry of Foreign Affairs and International Cooperation spokeswoman made an official announcement, explaining the deportees who chose to stay in the country would receive support and protection from the Rwandan government.

=== Israel ===
Israel implemented a deportation agreement with Rwanda aimed at sending African asylum seekers out of Israel. The plan was officially announced in January 2018, though it had been in development earlier. The agreement was largely kept confidential, with details only emerging through court proceedings and testimony from deported asylum seekers. Under the terms of the deal, Israel reportedly agreed to pay Rwanda $5,000 for every asylum seeker deported there. Asylum seekers deported to Rwanda under this agreement reportedly found themselves without legal status or rights, and many were subject to arrest or deportation back to their home countries. This situation led many to leave Rwanda, effectively becoming refugees once again. The scheme ultimately failed when Israel's supreme court suspended deportations in 2018. Rwanda subsequently denied ever signing a formal agreement with Israel, and the deal was widely criticized as a violation of international law and human rights.

=== Denmark ===
Denmark has what has been described as a zero-refugees policy, under which it had passed legislation in 2021 for refugees to be sent outside the European Union to be processed; Kagame himself had spoken of talks with the Danish government for Rwanda to participate as early as April 2022.

On 18 August 2022, Denmark opened an office in Rwanda in preparation to move forward with its plan. By 9 September, both Denmark and Rwanda agreed to move forward with it. The plan was met with polarised reactions, facing condemnation both domestically and internationally, while also receiving support from parties across the political spectrum.

=== European Union ===
Ministers from EU member-states Bulgaria, Denmark, Estonia, Finland, Greece, Hungary, Italy, Latvia, Lithuania, Malta, the Netherlands, Poland, Romania and the Czech Republic requested in early 2024 the European Commission should find a solution for sea rescued migrants to be brought to a safe place in a partnering country outside the European Union. European Commissioner for Home Affairs Ylva Johansson turned the request down and pointed to the New Pact on Migration and Asylum of the European Union instead, while Margaritis Schinas concluded in June 2024, plans like the United Kingdom's Rwanda initiative would not comply with EU laws and values.

=== Italy ===
Italy planned to deport its asylum seekers to Albania, but the agreement has been temporarily blocked by the Albanian constitutional court. Unlike the UK, Italy has no plans to cede its asylum responsibilities to Albania, or to prevent people who obtain asylum on Albanian soil from travelling to Italy. Any expulsions would also take place via Italy. The cost of this system is estimated at €650 million over five years. 12 men were sent to the camp in Albania in mid-October 2024. But a few days later, referring to a verdict of the European Court of Justice from 4 October 2024, which required a country deemed "safe" to be safe on all its territory and towards everybody, a court in Rome deemed Egypt and Bangladesh, where the detained, rejected asylum seekers originated from, do not meet that definition. The government was ordered to return the 12 men to Italy.

=== Other cases ===
Sky News compared the UK's scheme to those in use by other countries. In addition to Denmark, it also described the "Pacific Solution" that Australia announced in 2001, under which refugees were to be sent to Papua New Guinea and Nauru; the scheme was modified in 2013 to deter refugees trying to arrive by boat. It also described how the EU had tried measures, including sending migrants to Niger, to try to stop migrants dying trying to cross the Mediterranean from Africa into EU countries. A report released by the UK National Archives in 2023 revealed that Jonathan Powell had proposed a similar plan to Tony Blair in 2003. The proposed scheme would have involved sending asylum seekers to holding camps on the Isle of Mull before removing them to safe havens in third-party countries such as Kenya and South Africa. It was also suggested that the government could renounce the European Convention on Human Rights in order to avoid legal challenges and demonstrate a strong stance against illegal immigration.

== See also ==
- Safety of Rwanda (Asylum and Immigration) Act 2024
- Modern immigration to the United Kingdom
- Rwanda–United Kingdom relations
- English Channel illegal migrant crossings (2018–present)
- Externalization (migration)
- Human rights in the United Kingdom
- Illegal Migration Act 2023
- Illegal immigration to the United Kingdom
- Operation Sovereign Borders
- British Uganda Programme
- 2025 UK refugee plan
