= Eritreans in the United Kingdom =

Eritrean diaspora in the UK

Total population
- Eritrean-born residents 17,705 (2011 Census); 24,812 (2021 Census)

Regions with significant populations
- London, West Midlands, Yorkshire and the Humber, North West England

Languages
- Tigrinya, Tigre, English, Kunama Nara, Saho, Bilen, Afar

Religion
- Eritrean Orthodox, Sunni Islam, animism (traditional African Religions)

Eritreans in the United Kingdom or Eritrean Britons are Eritrean immigrants to the United Kingdom as well as their descendants.

The 2001 Census recorded 6,561 Eritrean-born people residing in the UK. According to the 2011 UK Census, there were 16,921 Eritrean-born residents in England, 361 in Wales, 399 in Scotland, and 24 in Northern Ireland. Of this total of 17,705 Eritrean-born residents, 10,198 lived in Greater London, 1,977 in the West Midlands, 1,901 in Yorkshire and the Humber and 1,249 in North West England. According to the 2021 UK census, there were 24,812 Eritrean-born residents in the UK.

Many Eritreans arrive in the United Kingdom as refugees; between 2006 and 2008 and in 2014, Britain received more Eritrean asylum-seekers than any other nationality.

== See also ==
- Eritrea–United Kingdom relations
