= One in, one out policy =

Crowd control policy

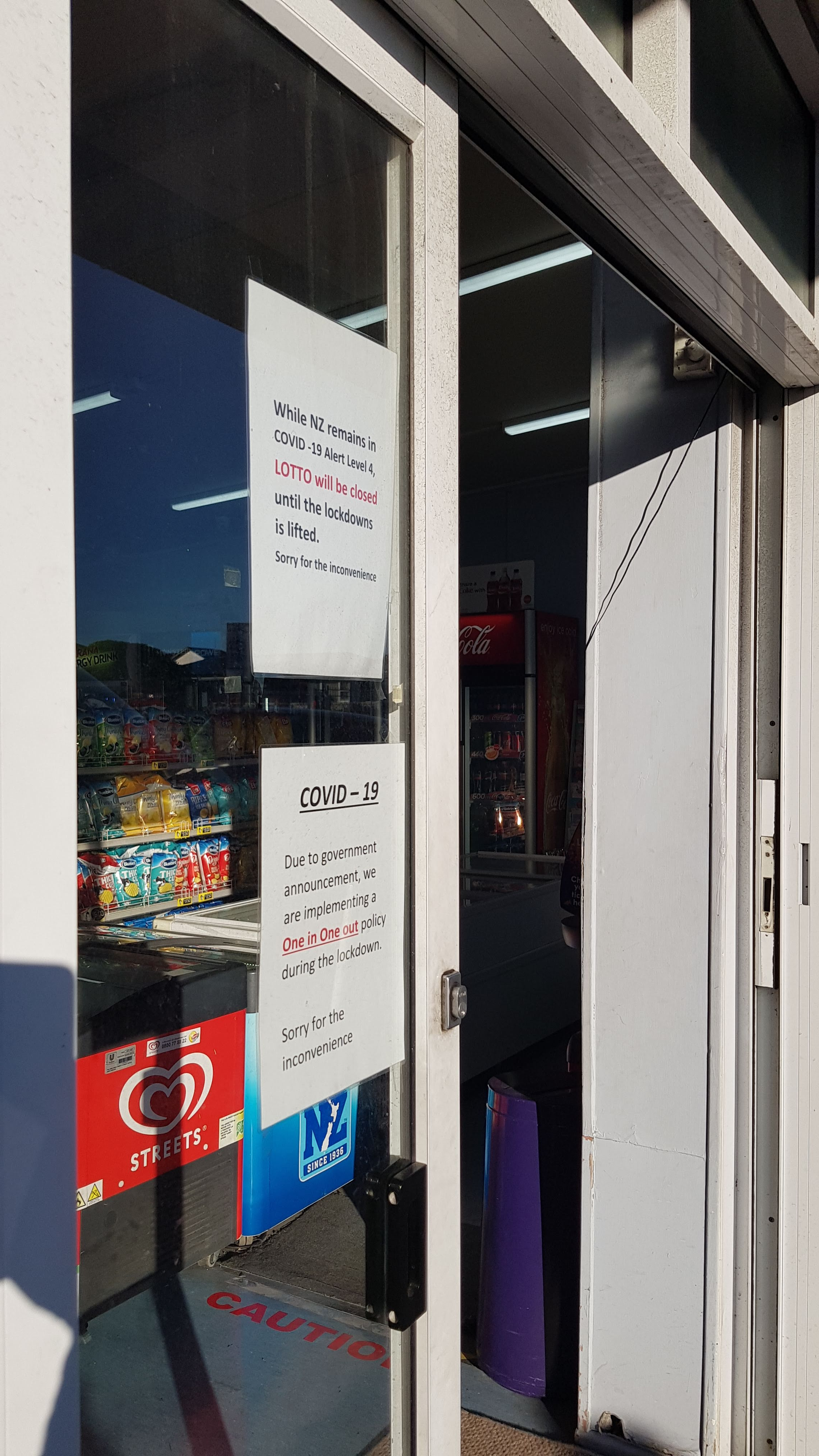
During the COVID-19 pandemic, stores controlled entry to limit numbers of shoppers.

A one in, one out policy is a method used to control the number of people in one place or building at any one time. Where a place or building has reached its maximum capacity, further entry is only allowed upon a person leaving. It is especially used in nightclubs and bars, and most military establishments.

The term is also used in reference to immigration, including the UK–France one in, one out plan which was in place from August 2025 to September 2026.
