= Lyde =

Lyde may refer to:

== People ==
- Samuel Lyde (1825–1860), British writer and missionary
- Lyde baronets, a title in the Baronetage of Great Britain
- Lyde of Lydia, mother of Alyattes reigned c. 635–585 BC
- Lyde Browne (antiquary) (died 1787), 18th-century English antiquary and banker
- Lyde Browne (British Army officer) (died 1803)

== Places and rivers ==
- River Lyde, in Buckinghamshire, England
- River Lyde (Hampshire), England
- Pipe and Lyde, village and civil parish in Herefordshire, England

== See also ==
- Barlow Lyde & Gilbert, is an international law firm in London, England
- Jacqui Frazier-Lyde (born 1962), American lawyer and former professional boxer, daughter of Joe Frazier
- John Lyde Wilson (1784–1849), the 49th Governor of South Carolina from 1822 to 1824, an ardent supporter of dueling
