= Lyde Browne =

Lyde Browne may refer to:

- Lyde Browne (antiquary) (died 1787), English antiquarian
- Lyde Browne (British Army officer) (died 1803)
