= Lydie =

Lydie may refer to:

- Lydie Arickx (born 1954), French artist, with parents of Flemish origin
- Lydie Auvray (born 1956), French accordionist, composer and singer
- Lydie Denier (born 1964), French model and actress
- Lydie Dubedat-Briero (born 1962), French rower
- Lydie Err (born 1949), Luxembourgish politician
- Lydie Koch-Miramond (1931–2023), French astrophysicist
- František Lydie Gahura (1891–1958), Czech architect and sculptor
- Lydie Hegewald (1884–1950), German film producer of the silent and early sound eras
- Lydie Marland (1900–1987), American socialite
- Lydie Massard (born 1978), French politician
- Lydie Pace (born 1968), Central African singer
- Lydie Polfer (born 1952), Luxembourgish politician
- Lydie Saki (born 1984), Ivorian professional footballer
- Lydie Salvayre (born 1948), French writer
- Lydie Schmit (1939–1988), Luxembourgish politician and teacher
- Lydie Solomon (born 1982), French pianist and actress
- Ndoua Lydie Yamkou (born 1984), Ivorian team handball player
- Lydie Erlanger, fictional character from Castlevania: Harmony of Dissonance

== See also ==
- Atelier Lydie & Suelle: Alchemists of the Mysterious Painting, a role-playing video game released in Japan for the PlayStation
- Lyddie
- Lyde (disambiguation)
- Lydia (disambiguation)
- Lydiane
- Lydiate
