= Shabana Mahmood =

British politician (born 1980)

The Right Honourable Shabana Mahmood MP
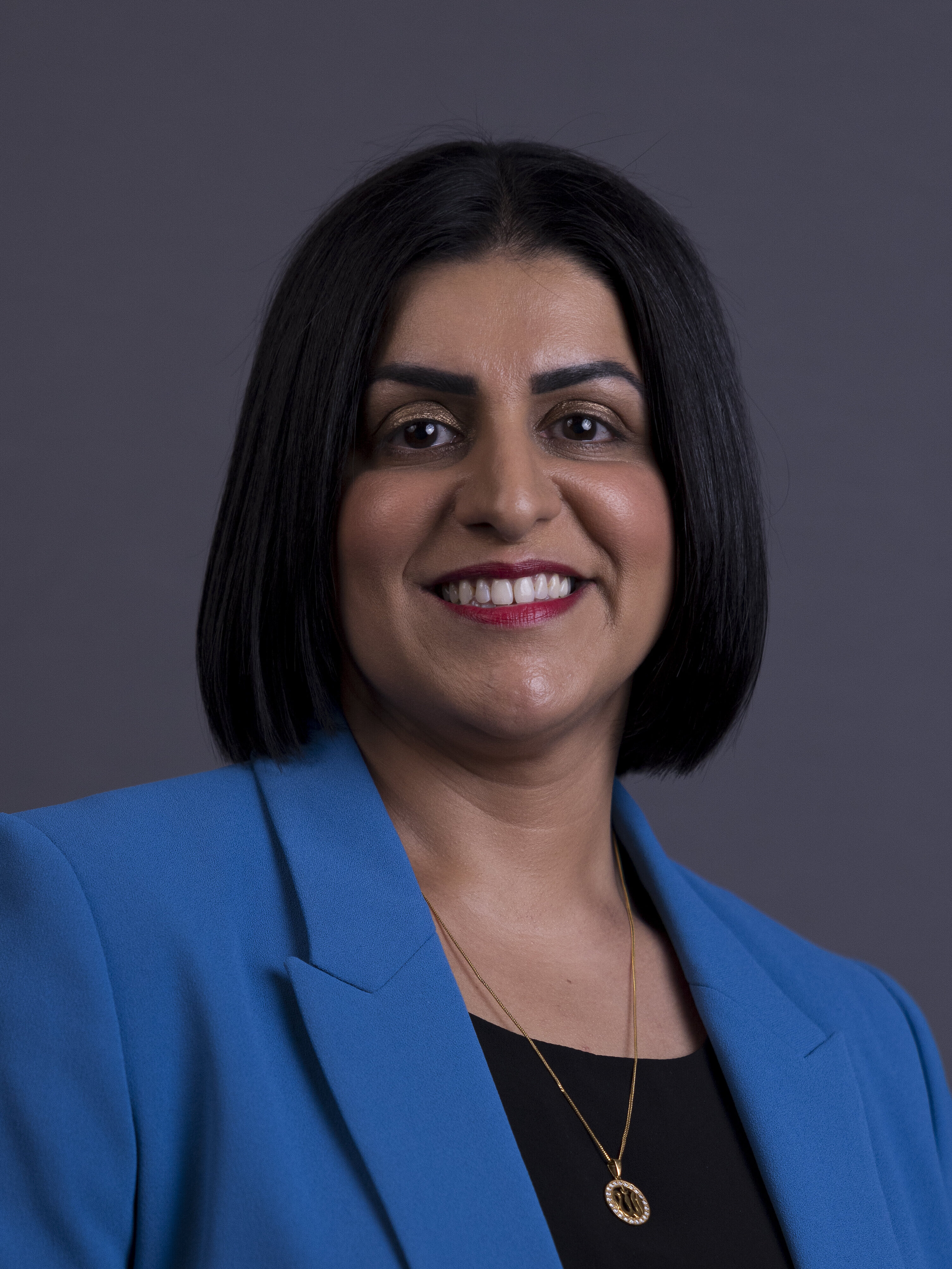
- Official portrait, 2025

Home Secretary
- Incumbent
- Assumed office 5 September 2025
- Prime Minister: Keir Starmer; Andy Burnham
- Preceded by: Yvette Cooper

Secretary of State for Justice; Lord Chancellor
- In office 5 July 2024 – 5 September 2025
- Prime Minister: Keir Starmer
- Preceded by: Alex Chalk
- Succeeded by: David Lammy
Shadow portfolios
Shadow Cabinet
2023–2024	Justice, Lord Chancellor
2021–2023	National Campaign Co-ordinator
2015	Chief Secretary to the Treasury
Shadow Minister
2013–2015	Financial Secretary to the Treasury
2011–2013	Higher Education
2010–2011	Prisons

Member of Parliament for Birmingham Ladywood
- Incumbent
- Assumed office 6 May 2010
- Preceded by: Clare Short
- Majority: 3,421 (9.4%)

Personal details
- Born: 17 September 1980 (age 46) Birmingham, West Midlands, England
- Party: Labour
- Other political affiliations: Blue Labour
- Education: Lincoln College, Oxford (BA)
- Website: shabanamahmood.org

Shabana Mahmood (/ʃəˈbɑːnə məˈmuːd/, born 17 September 1980) is a British politician and barrister who has been serving as Home Secretary since 2025. She previously served as Secretary of State for Justice and Lord Chancellor from 2024 to 2025. A member of the Labour Party, she has been Member of Parliament (MP) for Birmingham Ladywood since 2010. She has also served since September 2025 as chair of the Labour Party's National Executive Committee, the governing body of the party. Mahmood belongs to the more socially conservative Blue Labour faction of the Labour Party.

In 2002 Mahmood graduated with a degree in law from Lincoln College, Oxford. She went on to complete the Bar Vocational Course at the Inns of Court School of Law in 2003. As a barrister her specialism is professional indemnity. Her selection as the Labour Party candidate for Birmingham Ladywood for the 2010 general election caused some dissent in the constituency party, but was found by an inquiry led by a member of the National Executive Committee to be legitimate. She became one of the first female Muslim MPs, along with Rushanara Ali and Yasmin Qureshi. Between 2010 and 2024, while the Labour Party was the Official Opposition, she held various shadow frontbench positions, including Shadow Financial Secretary to the Treasury from 2013 to 2015.

Following the 2015 general election Mahmood was promoted to the shadow cabinet and served as Shadow Chief Secretary to the Treasury in the interim shadow cabinet of Harriet Harman. Following Jeremy Corbyn's election as Labour leader, Mahmood resigned from the position and declined to serve in Corbyn's shadow cabinet. She supported Owen Smith in the attempt to replace Corbyn at the 2016 leadership election. After serving on the backbenches between 2015 and 2021, Mahmood returned to the shadow cabinet in the May 2021 British shadow cabinet reshuffle under Keir Starmer as the National Campaign Coordinator. In his September 2023 shadow cabinet reshuffle Starmer appointed Mahmood Shadow Secretary of State for Justice and Shadow Lord Chancellor.

Following Labour's victory at the 2024 general election Mahmood was appointed Lord Chancellor and Secretary of State for Justice in the Starmer ministry. She implemented an early release scheme for thousands of prisoners to reduce prison overcrowding. In the 2025 cabinet reshuffle, she was promoted to Home Secretary. During her tenure, Mahmood has restricted immigration to the United Kingdom, including for refugees and asylum seekers, changed settlement rules for long-term migrants with longer timescales and more conditions to be met, and made changes to rules for political protests. After the resignation of Starmer, she was reappointed by Andy Burnham in July 2026.

== Early life and career ==
Shabana Mahmood was born on 17 September 1980 in Birmingham, the daughter of Zubaida and Mahmood Ahmed. Her parents are of Pakistani origin with roots in Mirpur, Azad Kashmir. (Note: Azad Kashmir is one of the Pakistani-administered territories in the disputed Kashmir region.) She has a twin brother, and a younger sister and brother. From 1981 to 1986 she lived with her family in Taif, Saudi Arabia, where her father worked as a civil engineer on desalination. After that, she was brought up in Birmingham. She failed the eleven-plus and attended Small Heath School and King Edward VI Camp Hill School for Girls after her GCSEs.

Her mother worked in a convenience shop that the family bought after returning to England. Her father became the chair of the local Labour Party. Mahmood often helped him to campaign in local elections. In an interview with Nick Robinson in 2024, Mahmood said that, although politics "had always been part of [her] life", her ambition when younger was to be a barrister, and cited the example of the fictional Kavanagh QC.

Mahmood read law at Lincoln College at the University of Oxford, where she was president of the Junior Common Room (JCR). She was awarded a 2:1 in 2002. In 2023, she recalled that Rishi Sunak, who would go on to become prime minister, was in the year above her at Lincoln College, and had promised to vote for her in the JCR election. She went on to complete the Bar Vocational Course at the Inns of Court School of Law in 2003, having received a scholarship from Gray's Inn. Mahmood is a qualified barrister, specialising in professional indemnity law. She worked at 12 King's Bench Walk from 2003 to 2004, and at Berrymans Lace Mawer from 2004 to 2007.

== Parliamentary career ==
=== Early career and frontbench (2010–2015) ===
Clare Short, the incumbent MP for Birmingham Ladywood, decided not to contest the 2010 general election. Mahmood and a local councillor, Yvonne Mosquito, both sought the Labour nomination. In the vote of Constituency Labour Party (CLP) members to select the candidate, Mahmood secured 118 votes, while Mosquito received 99. Supporters of Mosquito claimed that up to 30 members were prevented from voting for her following a rule change affecting eligibility. According to the political scholars Parveen Akhtar and Timothy Peace, "This led to the CLP being temporarily split on race lines between Asian and Afro-Caribbean factions, demonstrating the complicated ethnic tensions at play in some U.K. constituencies." Mahmood said that she did not feel that the local party was divided in this way, and commented that "I know there is a line out there about divisions, my experience doesn't mirror that in any way." An inquiry led by the National Executive Committee of the Labour Party member Mike Griffiths found that Mahmood's victory was legitimate.

At the 2010 general election, Mahmood was elected MP for Birmingham Ladywood with 55.7 per cent of the vote and a majority of 10,105. Along with Rushanara Ali and Yasmin Qureshi, Mahmood became one of the UK's first female Muslim MPs. The Labour Party was the Official Opposition, and Mahmood held various shadow cabinet front-bench positions under the new leader, Ed Miliband, including Shadow Minister for Prisons, Shadow Minister for Higher Education, and Shadow Financial Secretary to the Treasury.

In 2011, it was reported that Mahmood was on the list of people spied on by the private investigator Derek Webb for the News of the World, which was seeking information about the people of most interest to their readers. At the 2015 general election Mahmood was re-elected MP for Birmingham Ladywood with an increased vote share of 73.6 per cent and an increased majority of 21,868. She was appointed to the shadow cabinet as Shadow Chief Secretary to the Treasury. Nationwide the Labour Party's election results were below expectations, and Miliband resigned the following day. Mahmood was a co-chair of the campaign to elect Yvette Cooper at the 2015 party leadership election, and made a pledge to avoid negative briefing during the campaign.

=== Return to the backbenches (2015–2021) ===
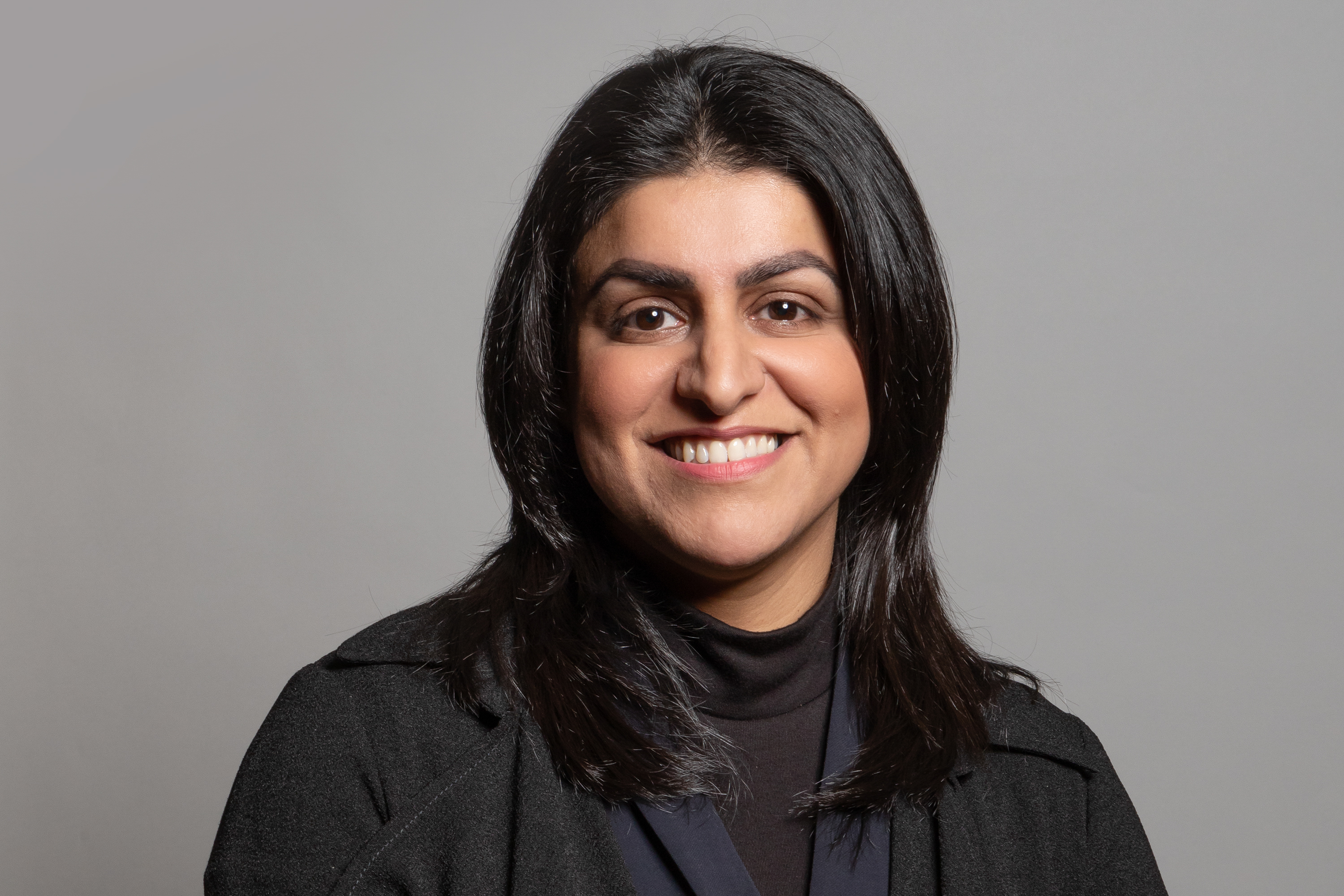
Mahmood's official parliamentary portrait, 2020

In September 2015, following Jeremy Corbyn's election as leader, Mahmood stepped down from her shadow cabinet role, saying she "strongly disagreed" with him on economic matters. The following month she was one of the winners of the women's magazine Marie Claire's Women at the Top Awards.

In January 2016, Mahmood was elected to represent the Parliamentary Labour Party on the National Executive Committee, and was re-elected in July 2016. She was offered a place in Corbyn's shadow cabinet, but declined, telling him that "I'll be miserable, and I'll make you miserable as well." In November 2016, she was elected one of the vice chairs of Labour's National Policy Forum. She supported Owen Smith in the failed attempt to replace Jeremy Corbyn at the 2016 party leadership election.

At the snap 2017 general election, Mahmood was again re-elected with an increased vote share of 82.7 per cent and an increased majority of 28,714. Mahmood was again re-elected at the 2019 general election with a decreased vote share of 79.2 per cent and a decreased majority of 28,582. Following Labour's election loss she was asked to commission a review launched by Labour Together of the party's election performance.

=== Return to the frontbench (2021–2024) ===
In the May 2021 shadow cabinet reshuffle, Mahmood returned to the shadow cabinet as National Campaign Coordinator, succeeding Angela Rayner. Peter Walker of The Guardian considered that Mahmood and Labour's campaign director Morgan McSweeney had improved the campaign organisation and use of data by the party by 2023.

In September 2023, Keir Starmer appointed Mahmood, seen as an ally of his, as Shadow Secretary of State for Justice. She was replaced as campaign co-ordinator by Pat McFadden. Also that month, Mahmood was named by the New Statesman as the 20th-most-powerful left-wing figure in Britain. At the 2024 general election, Mahmood was re-elected with a decreased share of 42.5 per cent and a majority of 3,421. She had been challenged by the independent candidate Akhmed Yakoob, whose campaign focused on support for Palestine. Yakoob finished second behind Mahmood, with 12,137 votes, following a campaign that Mahmood described as "sullied by harassment and intimidation".

=== Justice Secretary and Lord Chancellor (2024–2025) ===
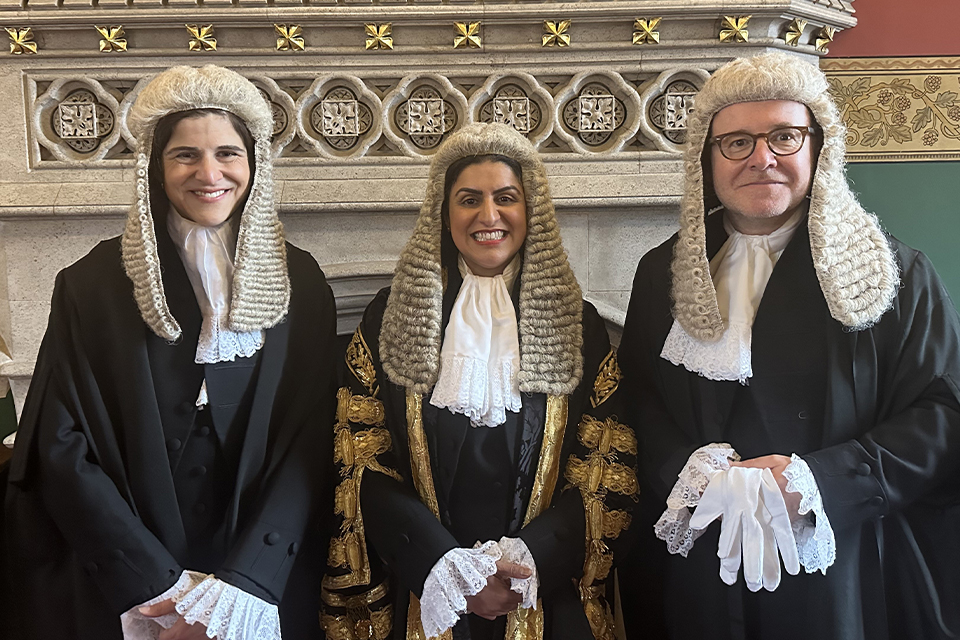
Mahmood (centre) at her swearing in as Lord High Chancellor, alongside Sarah Sackman as Solicitor General and Richard Hermer as Attorney General, on 15 July 2024

On 5 July 2024, Starmer appointed Mahmood Secretary of State for Justice and Lord Chancellor. This made her the first Muslim and third female lord chancellor in history after Eleanor of Provence and Liz Truss. (Note: Eleanor of Provence exercised the powers of the lord chancellor in 1253 but was not formally appointed to the office.)

A week following her appointment, she announced measures intended to decrease prison overcrowding, describing the situation in prisons as a ticking "time bomb" and saying that prisons were on the "point of collapse". Under her plans some prisoners would be released after serving 40 per cent of their sentences in England and Wales, rather than the 50 per cent announced previously in October 2023. She stated that she expected that the number of prisoners to be released in September 2024 would be "in the low thousands", with further releases over the following 18 months with updates in Parliament every three months. This included 37 who were not eligible for early release. At least one is suspected to have gone on to offend again.

Following the 2024 United Kingdom riots, Mahmood pledged that "the full force of the law [would] be brought against" the rioters, and those inciting them. She also remarked that the volume of cases relating to the riots would affect the UK's justice system for years.

=== Home Secretary (2025–present) ===
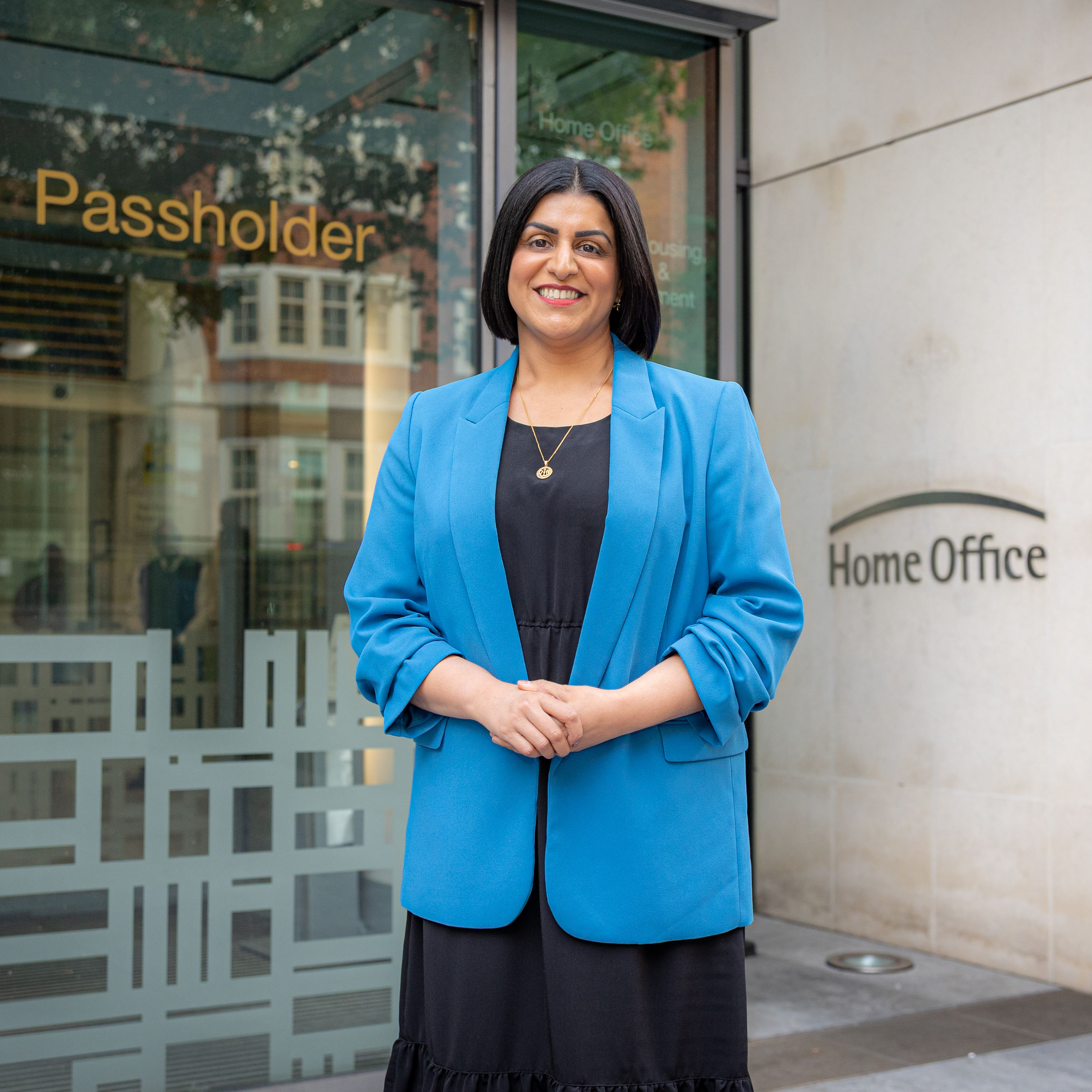
Mahmood at the Home Office after her appointment on 5 September 2025.

On 5 September 2025, Mahmood was appointed Home Secretary in the 2025 British cabinet reshuffle, replacing Yvette Cooper. Her appointment was seen as signalling a shift towards a more hard-line stance on immigration and was welcomed by Maurice Glasman, the founder of Blue Labour, as "fantastic". The following day, on 6 September, the UK saw its first 'uncontrolled landing' (an unescorted migrant boat reaching British shores) since December 2022. Defence Secretary John Healey said he expected Mahmood to be "just as tough" as Yvette Cooper on Palestine Action.

On 5 October, Mahmood announced plans to enable the police to impose restrictions in location and duration or ban outright "repeat protests", in response to demonstrations against the Gaza war and the proscription of Palestine Action. The "cumulative impact" of earlier protests would be grounds "in and of itself" for the police to impose restrictions. The announcement was criticised by Amnesty International and Liberty. Former director of Liberty Shami Chakrabarti warned what a future Nigel Farage government may do with these powers, and said that protests are disruptive to be effective.

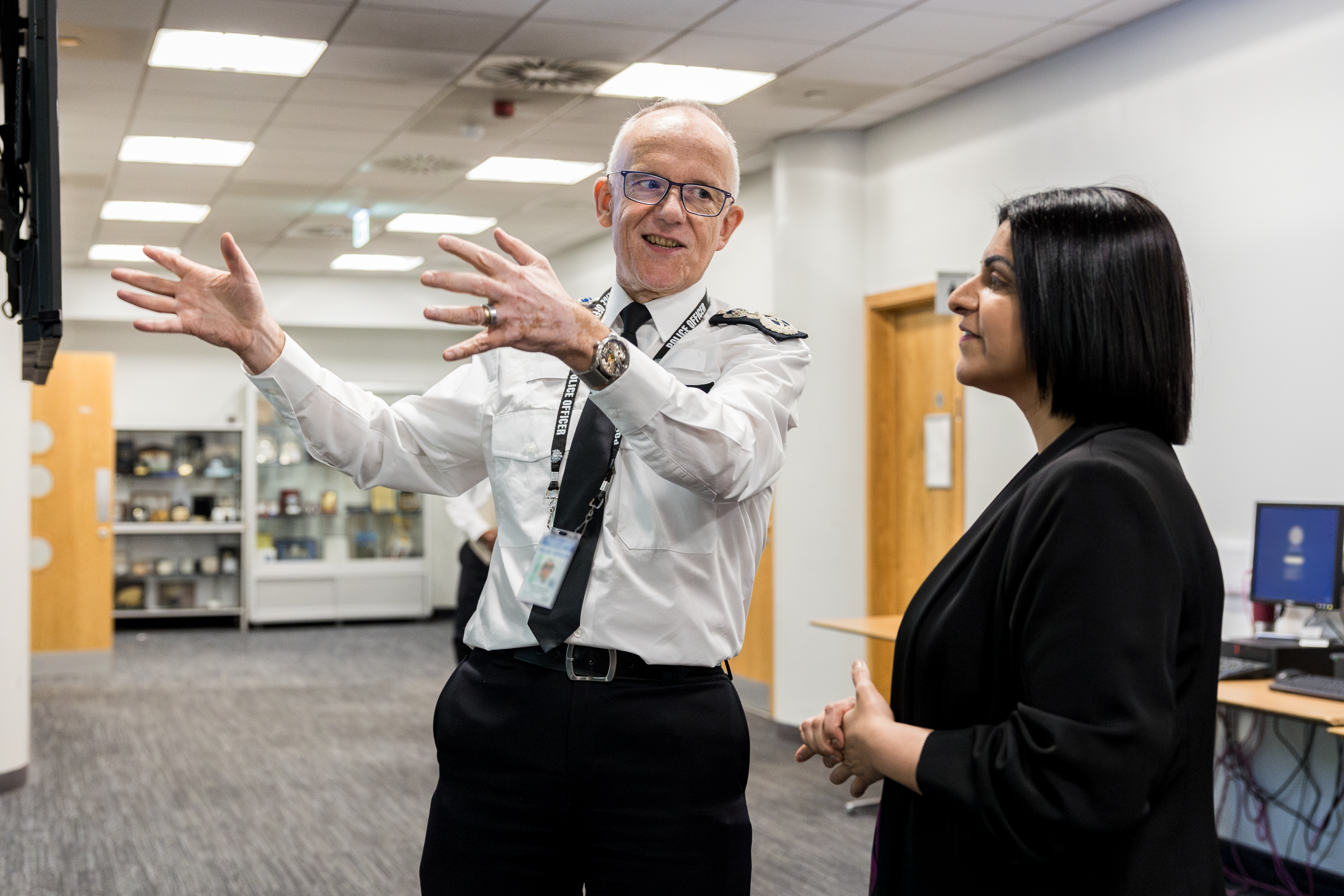
Mahmood with Metropolitan Police Commissioner Mark Rowley on 6 September 2025.

On 18 November 2025 Mahmood presented to Parliament her 2025 UK refugee changes, asking to reduce irregular and illegal migration. The far-right activist, Tommy Robinson, supported Mahmood's proposals to overhaul the asylum system. Mahmood announced that visas would be suspended for nationals of Angola, Namibia and the Democratic Republic of Congo (DRC) if their governments would not co-operate with removals of illegal immigrants. The governments of Angola and Namibia announced co-operation. In the year up to June 2025, there were eleven irregular entrants from the DRC, three from Angola and none from Namibia, while 712 people from those countries were amongst the 800,000 granted visas.

In November 2025, Mahmood welcomed the fall in net migration to its "lowest level in half a decade" but emphasised that the government must "go further because the pace and scale of migration has placed immense pressure on local communities". This followed ONS figures released in late 2025 showing that while long-term entries (898,000) continued to exceed departures (693,000) for the year ending June 2025, net migration fell sharply to 204,000. This represents a significant drop from 649,000 the previous year and a record peak of 944,000 in 2023. While non-EU nationals remained the only group with positive net migration (+383,000), both EU+ and British citizens experienced a net outflow, with more individuals departing than arriving.

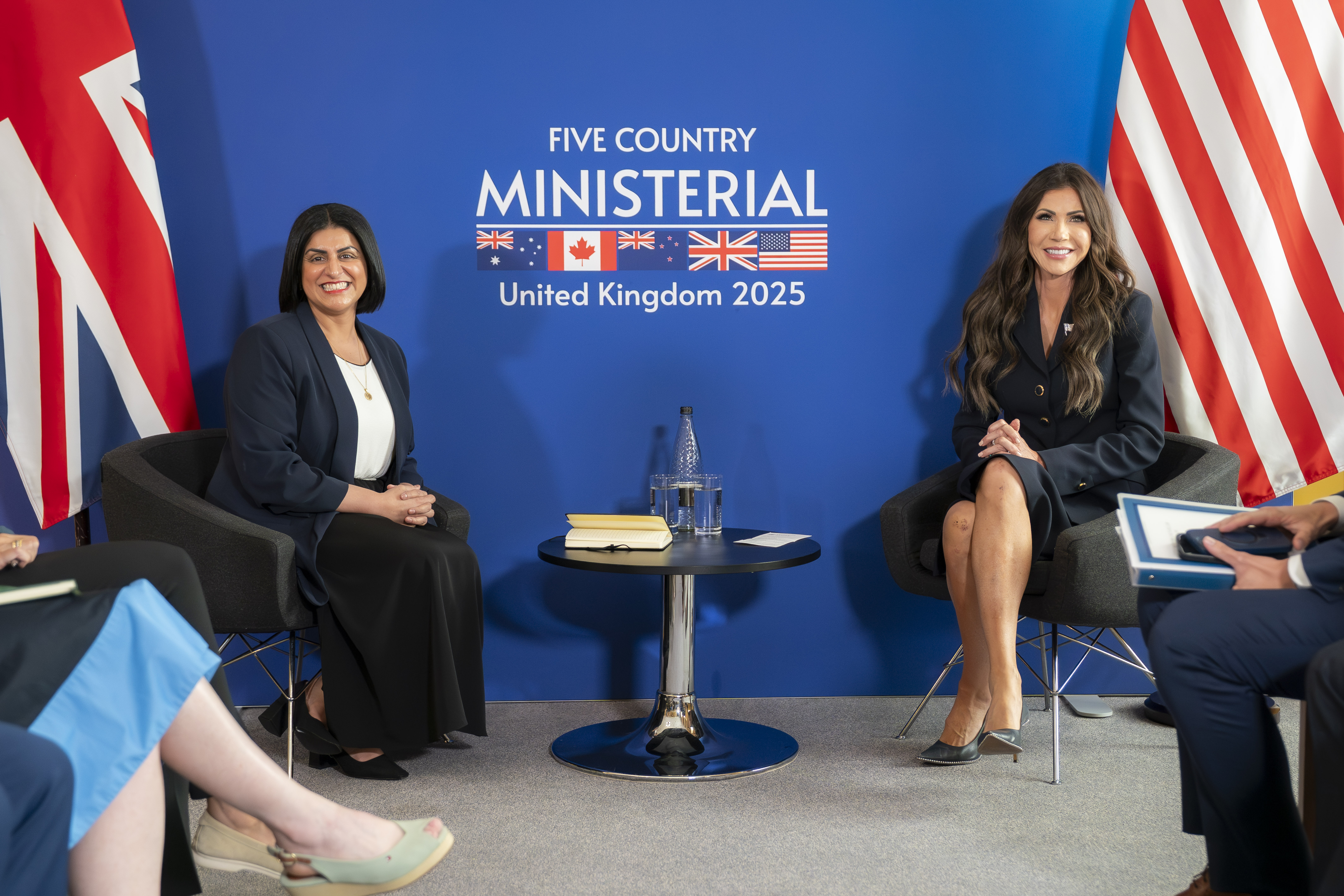
Mahmood with Homeland Security Secretary Kristi Noem on 8 September 2025

In 2025, a total of 41,472 migrants arrived in the UK via small boat crossings in the English Channel. Mahmood has characterised the situation as "shameful" and argued that irregular migration is "tearing our country apart". The 2025 UK refugee plan is a proposed overhaul of the United Kingdom's asylum and immigration system. The plan was announced and led by Mahmood, and was presented to Parliament on 17 November 2025.

In March 2026, Mahmood announced that successful asylum seekers would only be offered only temporary protection, instead of permanent protection. They would have their refugee status reviewed every 30 months and would be required to return to their country of origin once it is deemed safe to do so. These changes, which would take effect immediately and retroactively, were characterised as the "most significant change to Britain’s refugee laws since the Second World War." These proposals have been controversial within Labour including outspoken critic Angela Rayner. Over 100 Labour MPs, peers in the House of Lords and union leaders have also criticised the strategy.

Mahmood was criticised after telling hecklers, whom she branded as "white liberals", to "fuck off" and responding "all of the above" after being asked who of opposition party leaders Kemi Badenoch, Ed Davey, Nigel Farage or Zack Polanski she would "taser or deport" during the recording of a live podcast interview with Matt Forde on 20 April 2026. A Green Party spokesperson described her comments as demonstrating a "sickening indifference" to the consequences of her decisions, while one of the hecklers cited her "cruel" immigration policies and alleged authoritarianism as a reason for the disruption.

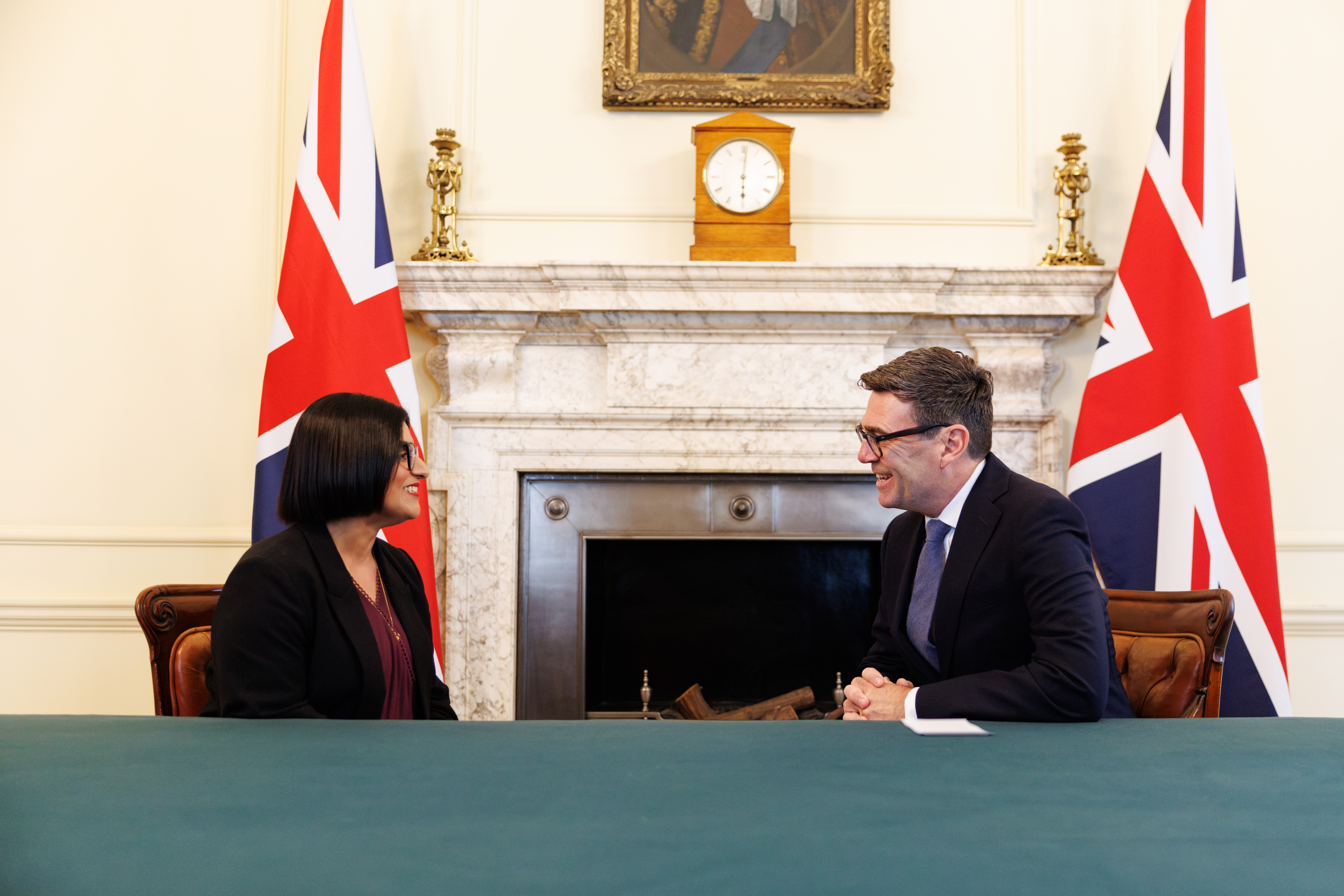
Mahmood being reappointed by Andy Burnham on 20 July 2026.

On 20 July 2026, Burnham reappointed Mahmood to continue as Home Secretary in his ministry. The following day, Mahmood and Defence Secretary Wes Streeting were heard on camera making comments over the early prisoner release scheme with Justice Secretary Alex Norris. Streeting described Norris as "the enemy now" while Mahmood responded "no he's not", and Streeting subsequently stated that "he wants to let them all out". Both Streeting and Mahmood subsequently apologised, with Mahmood stating "I think everyone can see there was no ill intent behind this ribbing of the new Lord Chancellor".

== Political positions ==
Ideologically, Mahmood identifies as a social conservative and as belonging to the Blue Labour faction of the Labour Party. Following her appointment as Home Secretary in 2025, Blue Labour founder Maurice Glasman described her as "clearly the leader of our part of the party". In an interview with Michael Gove, the editor of The Spectator in 2025, she described herself as a small-c social conservative and named Margaret Thatcher and Benazir Bhutto as her political idols, but said this was because they were women who came to power in "tight patriarchal systems" rather than for their political ideas. On the issue of the Grooming gangs scandal, Mahmood said that "there is still a moment of reckoning", adding "there is still an outstanding question of why so many people looked the other way". She supported Starmer's efforts to reduce legal immigration to the United Kingdom.

=== Israel and Palestine ===
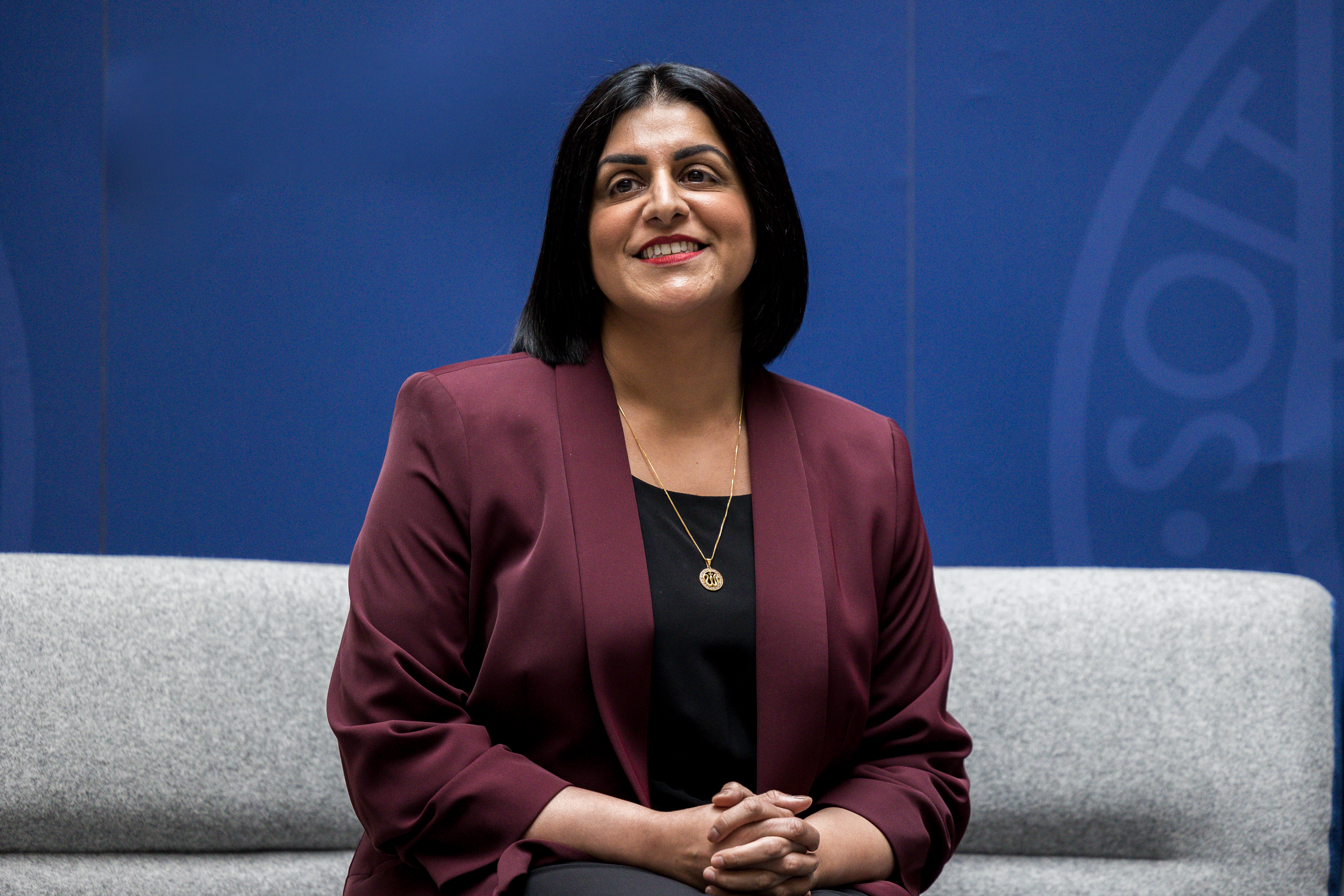
Mahmood in September 2025.

Mahmood says on her website that she is a passionate supporter of Palestinian rights. In 2014 she took part in a demonstration outside a branch of Sainsbury's in Birmingham city centre. She said "We lay down in the street and we lay down inside Sainsbury's to say we object to them stocking goods from illegal settlements – and that they must stop. We managed to close down that store at peak time on a Saturday. This is how we can make a difference." The Jewish Chronicle reported that she was criticised for this by members of the Board of Deputies of British Jews and the Jewish Leadership Council. The report also said that the chair of the Jewish Labour Movement and the director of Antisemitism Policy Trust both said that she had taken action against antisemitism.

On 13 October 2023, following the October 7 attacks, Mahmood published a statement to her parliamentary constituents in which she wrote that "I unequivocally condemn the despicable actions of Hamas, who targeted innocent Israeli civilians. The hostages must be returned. These atrocities were committed by terrorists who do not seek peace and have set back the just cause of Palestinian freedom and statehood, which I have supported my whole life."

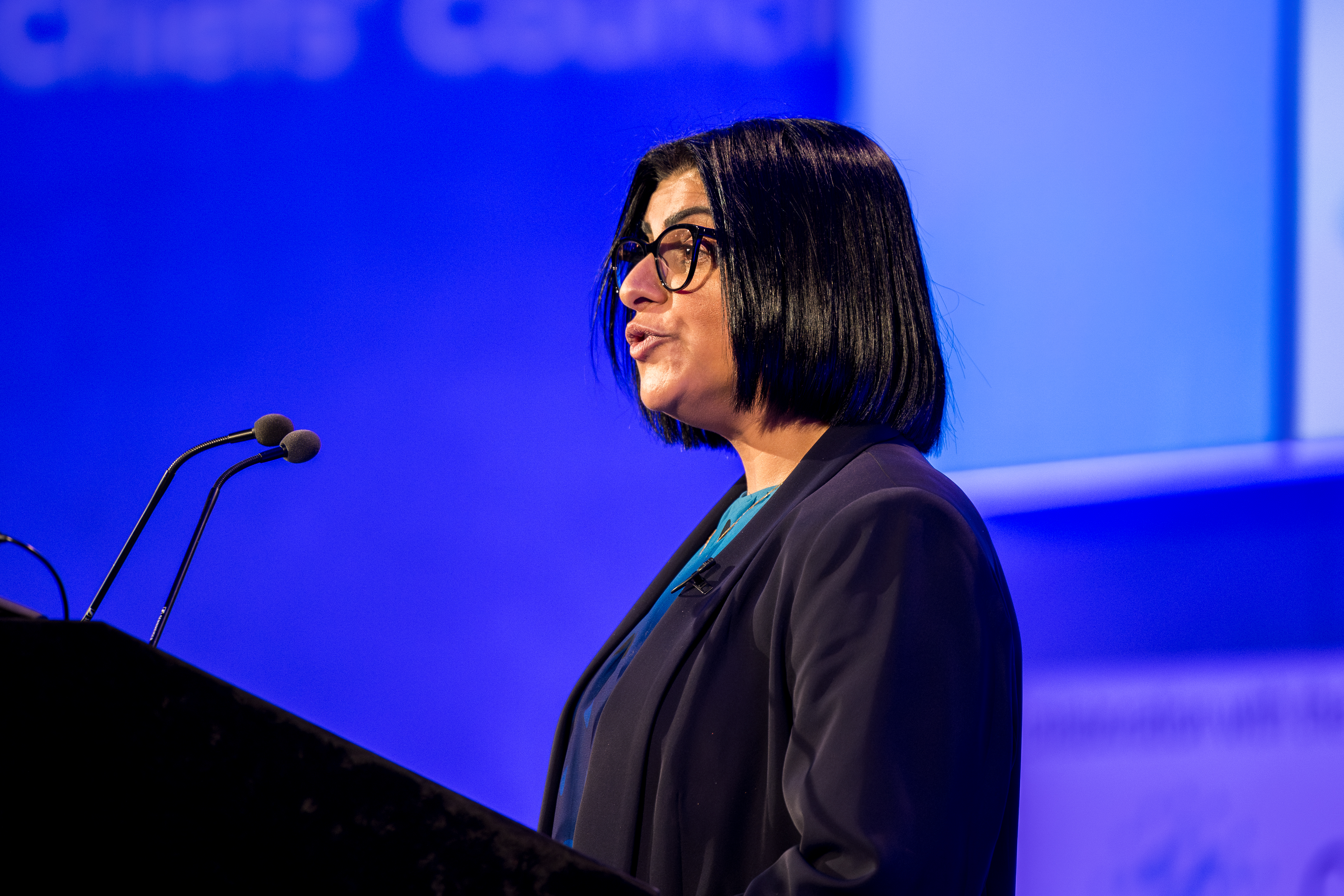
Mahmood in October 2025.

In July 2024, Mahmood was promoted to the role of Secretary of State for Justice. Following a wave of Islamophobic and racist abuse directed at her on social media, senior leaders of the British Jewish community made public statements in support of her, including Danny Stone, director of the Antisemitism Policy Trust, who stated that she "has been kind, thoughtful, and supportive in all of my dealings with her, including on serious issues of conspiratorial antisemitism. She has been relentlessly abused and deserves some kindness" and that she had "taken direct action against antisemitism."

In 2024, Mahmood voted against making BDS illegal. She did not sign a letter urging the UK to uphold the International Criminal Court's arrest warrants for Israeli officials; abstained from several key votes on issues related to the war in Gaza, including a call for a ceasefire in Gaza in November 2023, and a call to suspend arms sales to Israel in March 2024; and chose to abstain from proscribing Palestine Action as a terrorist group. However, when the high court reversed the ban on Palestine Action, she said she will "fight" the judgement in the court of appeal.

=== LGBT issues ===
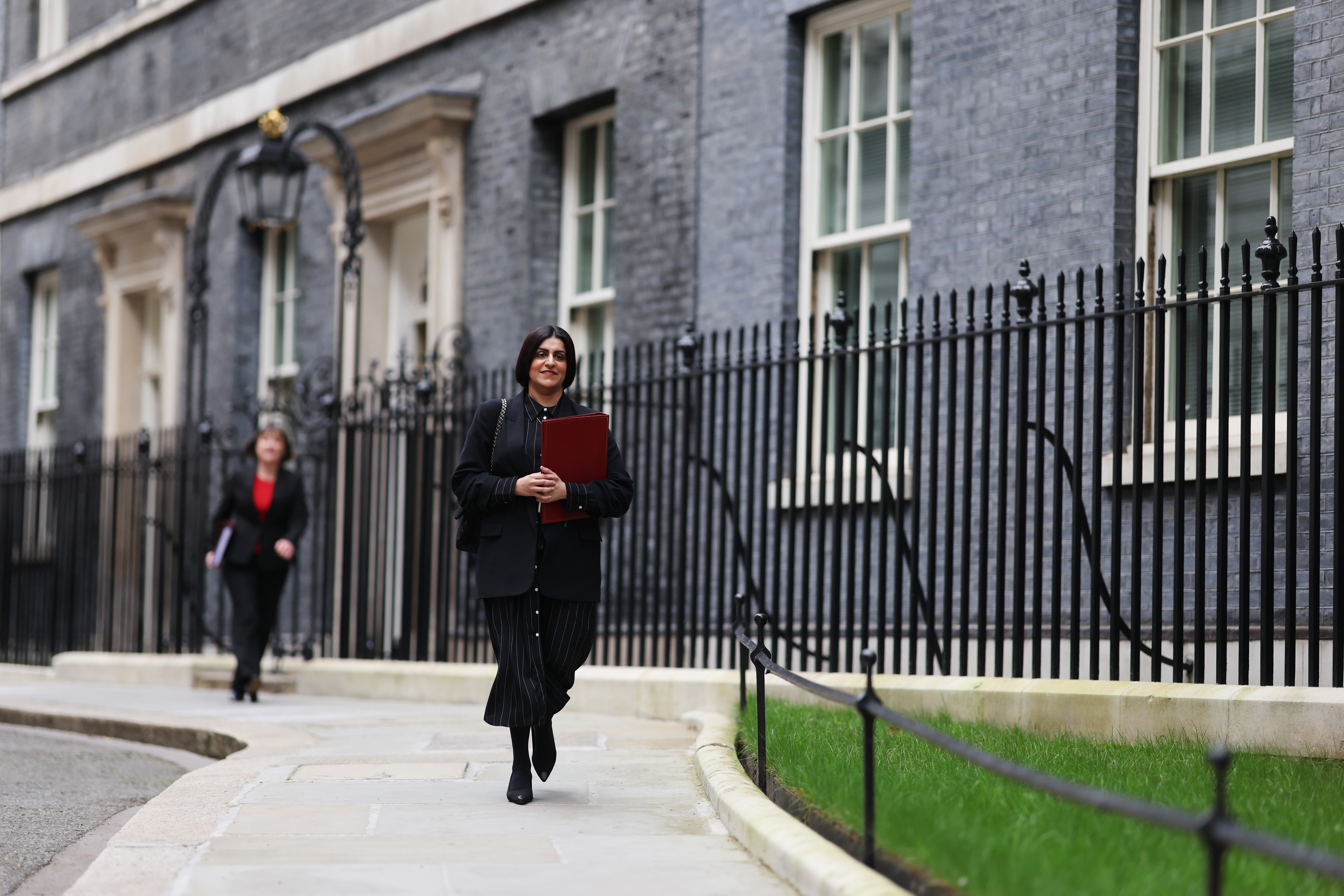
Mahmood leaving Downing Street in March 2026.

In March 2019, Mahmood was criticised by activists within her party after stating that the "religious background" of pupils and "age appropriateness" should be considered when teaching LGBTQ content during Relationship and Sex Education (RSE) lessons in schools, after 1,700 of her constituents signed a petition objecting to teaching such content at a primary school. The columnist Owen Jones said on Twitter that her remarks were "shocking", feeling that they supported parents "trying to stop lessons educating pupils about the existence of gay people". Mahmood replied that she had never advocated exclusion of LGBT relationships from RSE lessons.

In 2013, Mahmood voted in favour of the Marriage (Same Sex Couples) Act 2013 which legalised same sex marriage in England and Wales. No vote was recorded for Mahmood on New Clause 1 of the Northern Ireland (Executive Formation) Bill in July 2019, which required regulations to provide for same-sex marriage in Northern Ireland.In a 2024 interview with The Daily Telegraph Mahmood said that she was concerned with the treatment of gender-critical activists, saying that "many women have had to go to court, usually in employment tribunals, in order to clarify ... their right to say that biological sex is real and is immutable – a position that I also agree with" and that women "shouldn't be in the position of losing their jobs" for espousing those views. She also said that she "agrees with J. K. Rowling" regarding the view that "biological sex is real and is immutable", and that Rowling was "leading the fight in this area". Following the Supreme Court's 2025 ruling in For Women Scotland Ltd v The Scottish Ministers, which concerns transgender people, Mahmood said that criticism of the ruling was "absolutely unacceptable".

=== Assisted dying ===
Mahmood publicly opposed and voted against the Terminally Ill Adults (End of Life) Bill on assisted dying. In October 2024 she said: "I voted against the bill when it was last introduced in 2015. I'll be voting against it again. As a Muslim, I have an unshakable belief in the sanctity and value of human life. I don't think death is a service that the state should be offering."

In November 2024, she stated that "Sadly, recent scandals – such as Hillsborough, infected blood and the Post Office Horizon – have reminded us that the state and those acting on its behalf are not always benign. I have always held the view that, for this reason, the state should serve a clear role. It should protect and preserve life, not take it away. The state should never offer death as a service." She also stated that "We must never accept the wrongful deaths of some in exchange for the desired deaths of others. That line, once crossed, will be crossed for ever. The right to die, for some, will – inexorably and inevitably – become the duty to die for others. And that is why I will be voting against this bill."

=== Policing and surveillance ===
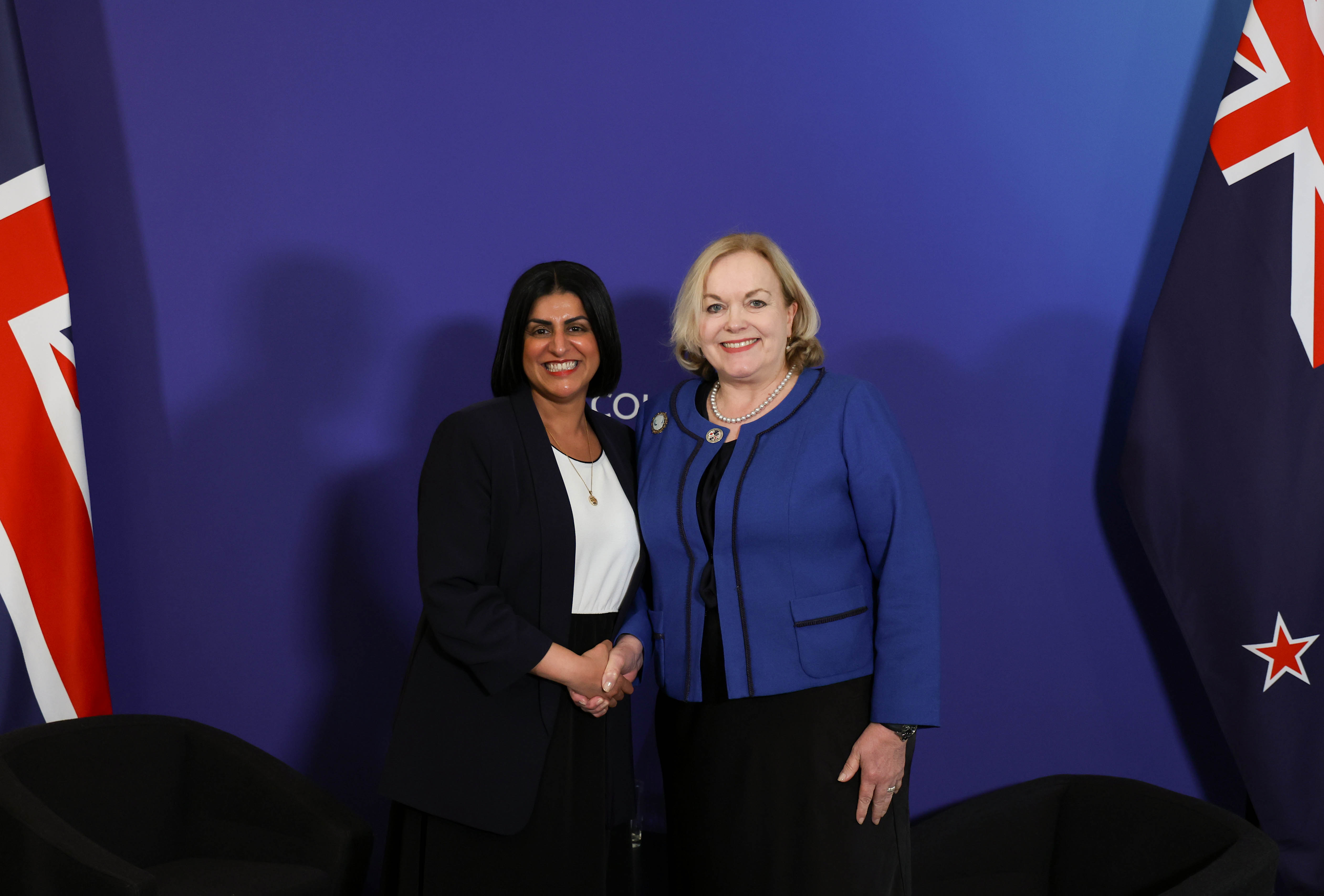
Mahmood with New Zealand Defence Minister Judith Collins in September 2025.

In January 2026, Mahmood announced a plan for the largest national rollout of live facial recognition (LFR) technology in the history of British law enforcement as part of a comprehensive policing white paper. The plans include increasing the number of mobile LFR camera vans from 10 to 50, making them available to all police forces in England and Wales to scan public spaces for individuals on police watchlists. Mahmood defended the expansion, stating that "there is no true liberty if you are unsafe in your own country" and comparing the technology's adoption to the historical introduction of fingerprinting.

Beyond LFR, Mahmood outlined a vision for the broader integration of AI within the criminal justice system to automate administrative tasks and predict crime and knifing hotspots. In an interview with Tony Blair, she stated her intent to "achieve, by means of AI and technology, what Jeremy Bentham tried to do with his panopticon", further remarking that her vision was "that the eyes of the state can be on you at all times."

== Personal life ==
In a 2024 interview with Gabriel Pogrund of The Sunday Times, Mahmood was described as a "devout Muslim". She said, "My faith is the centrepoint of my life and it drives me to public service, it drives me in the way that I live my life and I see my life."

== Honours ==
Mahmood was sworn into the Privy Council on 6 July 2024, entitling her to be styled "The Right Honourable" for life.

== Notes ==
Parliament of the United Kingdom
Preceded by Clare Short	Member of Parliament for Birmingham Ladywood; 2010–present	Incumbent
Political offices
Preceded by Alan Duncan	Shadow Minister for Prisons; 2010–2011	Succeeded by David Hanson
Preceded by Iain Wright	Shadow Minister for Higher Education; 2011–2013	Succeeded by Liam Byrne
Preceded by Chris Leslie	Shadow Financial Secretary to the Treasury; 2013–2015	Succeeded by Alison McGovern
Preceded by Chris Leslie	Shadow Chief Secretary to the Treasury; 2015	Succeeded by Seema Malhotra
Preceded by Steve Reed	Shadow Secretary of State for Justice; 2023–2024	Succeeded by Edward Argar
Preceded by Steve Reed	Shadow Lord Chancellor; 2023–2024	Succeeded by Edward Argar
Preceded by Alex Chalk	Secretary of State for Justice; 2024–2025	Succeeded by David Lammy
Preceded by Alex Chalk	Lord High Chancellor of Great Britain; 2024–2025	Succeeded by David Lammy
Preceded by Yvette Cooper	Home Secretary; 2025–present	Incumbent
Party political offices
Preceded by Angela Rayner	Labour Party National Campaign Coordinator; 2021–2023	Succeeded by Pat McFadden
