= Halliwells =

Halliwells LLP
- Headquarters: Manchester, United Kingdom
- No. of offices: Four
- No. of lawyers: 372 (2010)
- No. of employees: 848 (2010)
- Major practice areas: General practice
- Revenue: £67 million (2010)
- Date founded: 2004
- Company type: Limited liability partnership
- Dissolved: 20 July 2010

Halliwells LLP was an English law firm practising from offices in Manchester, London, Liverpool and Sheffield, with 116 partners and around 850 employees. The LLP was established in 2004 to take over the practice of Halliwell Landau. Key individuals involved in its management were senior partner Alec Craig and managing partner (then executive chairman) Ian Austin, London office head Clive Garston, Liverpool office head and then managing partner Jonathan Brown, and Sheffield office head Suzanne Liversidge.

== Insolvency ==
On 20 July 2010, the High Court made an order putting Halliwells into administration. Dermot Power and Shay Bannon of BDO LLP were appointed administrators. Halliwells' practice was sold as a pre-packaged insolvency to four other firms: Hill Dickinson, Barlow Lyde & Gilbert, Gateley, and Kennedys.

At the time, this was the largest English law firm to go into administration.

The administrators initially blamed market conditions and high rents for the firm's failure. An additional factor behind the firm's failure was a property transaction connected to Halliwells' decision to become an anchor tenant in the Spinningfields business development in Manchester. The firm received a reverse premium of £20 million from the landlord, which was shared between the firm's 32 equity partners, who each took between £250,000 and £1 million. This was kept secret from the junior partners. The administrators have sued the 32 recipients and have alleged that Halliwells’ equity partners altered the minutes of a meeting about the reverse premium before passing them on to the rest of the firm. There has been an attempt to resolve the dispute by mediation. Ian Austin and Suzanne Liversidge have each spoken publicly about Halliwells' failure and denied any personal responsibility.

In March 2012, 36 of the former junior partners who were not told about the reverse premium threatened to sue the 32 equity partners who took the £20 million.
