= Clyde & Co =

Global commercial law firm

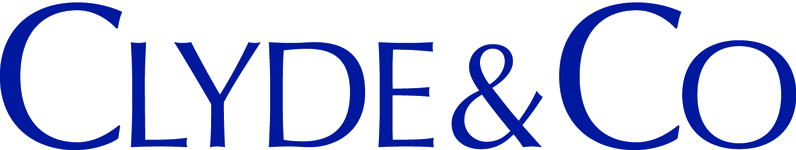
- Headquarters: St Botolph Building; London, EC3; United Kingdom
- No. of offices: 60+
- No. of lawyers: 2,600
- No. of employees: 5,000
- Major practice areas: Insurance, Energy, Trade & Commodities, Infrastructure and Transport
- Revenue: £788.6 million (2022-23)
- Date founded: 1933
- Company type: Limited liability partnership
- Website: clydeco.com

Clyde & Co is a global law firm headquartered in London, United Kingdom. The firm employs 2,600 legal professionals and more than 5,000 total staff. As of 2023, Clyde & Co's revenue was £788.6 million.

== History ==
Clyde & Co was founded by Scottish lawyer Richard Arthur Clyde. The earliest record of Clyde practicing independently dates to 1928. In 1933, he established an office in Lime Street in London's insurance district, representing Lloyd's underwriters and insurance companies. He later entered into partnership with Maurice Hill of the Liverpool law firm Hill Dickinson.

Michael Payton, who joined the firm in 1966 and became senior partner in 1984. In 2012, he became chairman and was succeeded as senior partner by James Burns.

In 1981 Clyde & Co opened its first overseas office in Hong Kong. The firm later opened offices in Sydney, Beijing, and Madrid.

In 2011, the firm announced mergers with Canadian firm Nicholl Paskell-Mede and UK-based Barlow Lyde & Gilbert. The merger with Barlow Lyde & Gilbert was reported as the largest merger between two UK law firms with an expected turnover of over £300 million. In September 2015, the firm merged with Scottish firm Simpson & Marwick. In 2022, the firm announced that it would merge with law firm BLM. The combined firm now goes by the Clyde & Co name, has 2,600 lawyers in 60 offices, and has an annual revenue of more than £700 million.

In 2017, the firm expanded into Mexico through a merger with Garza Tello & Asociados, establishing its first office in the country. United States presence was continued with offices opening in Phoenix, Denver, and Las Vegas, in 2021. In 2023 a merger with Hermes, Netburn, O'Connor & Spearing brought Clyde & Co to the Boston area.

In 2025, Clyde & Co entered into a five-year carbon removal agreement with Nature Broking to address projected residual emissions through 2038.

In 2026, Clyde & Co expanded its North American presence through a merger with Forsberg & Umlauf, opening offices in Seattle and Portland.

== Controversy ==
In 2010, former Clyde & Co partner Krista Bates alleged that an African lawyer associated with the firm had engaged in bribery and money laundering while she was working in Tanzania. After being suspended and later expelled from the partnership, Bates filed a lawsuit claiming whistleblower protection. Clyde & Co argued that LLP partners were not entitled to whistleblower protections because they were not employees. In 2014, the Supreme Court of the United Kingdom ruled that LLP members qualified as "workers" under whistleblowing legislation.

In September 2020, in connection with the investigations into $4.5 billion missing from 1MDB, a $330 million account held by Clyde & Co was named in a U.S. Department of Justice civil forfeiture case connected to investigations into the 1MDB scandal.

== See also ==
- List of 100 largest UK law firms
- List of 100 largest European law firms
