= St Botolph Building =

Coordinates: 51.514822°N 0.077116°W

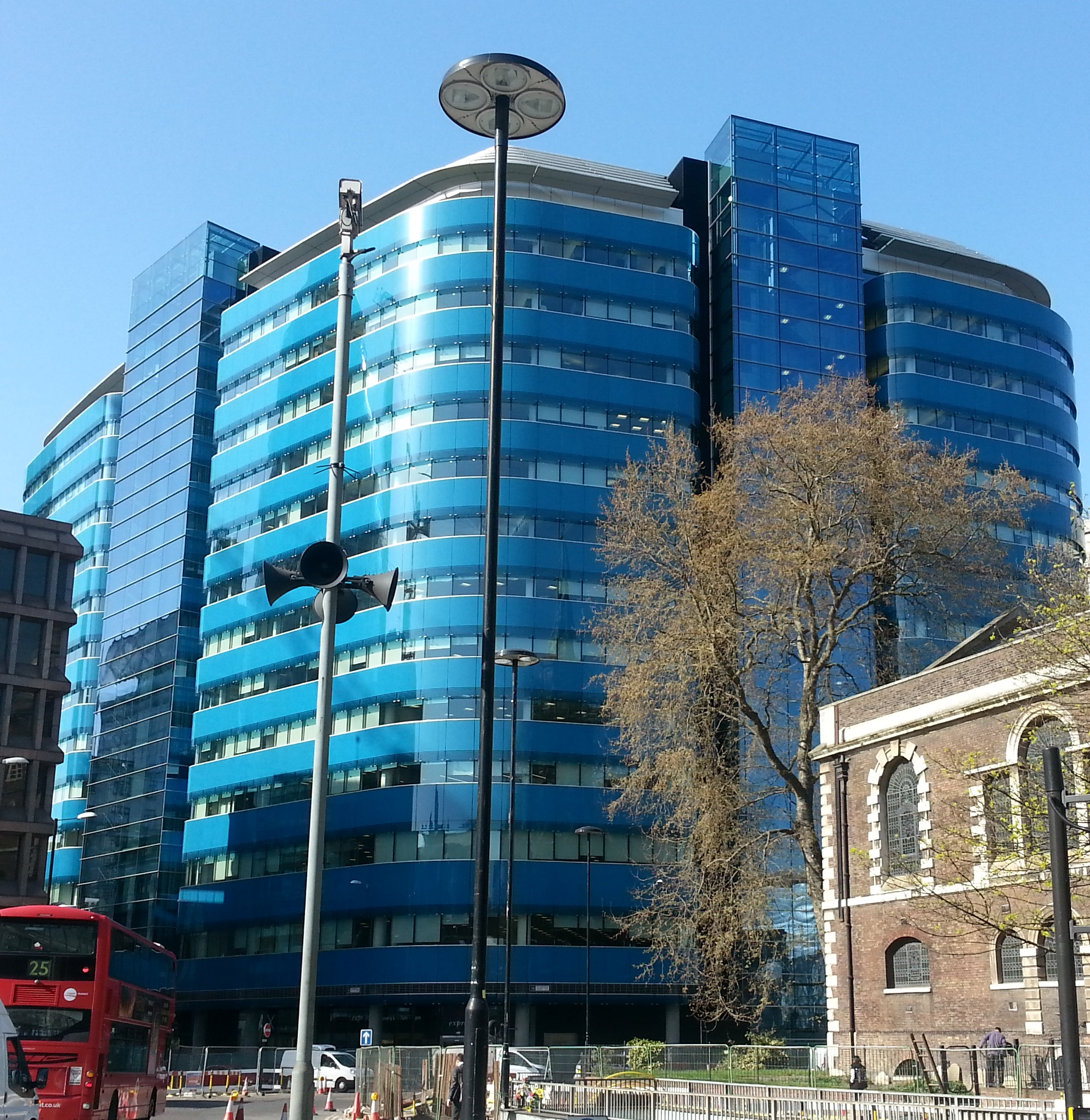
- Viewed from the South, standing in the Aldgate Gyratory system, with part of St Botolph's church, Aldgate, visible to the right (April 2015)
- Interactive map of the St Botolph Building area

General information
- Status: Completed
- Type: Office
- Architectural style: Post-modern / High-tech
- Location: London, EC3; United Kingdom
- Completed: December 2010
- Opened: 2011
- Cost: £195m estimated

Height
- Roof: 59 metres (194 ft)

Technical details
- Floor count: 15
- Floor area: 49,238 m^{2} (529,990 sq ft)

Design and construction
- Architect: Grimshaw Architects
- Structural engineer: Arup

Website
- www.stbb.co.uk

The St Botolph Building is a commercial office in Houndsditch, central London, opened in 2011 and designed by Grimshaw Architects.

It is one of a number of landmark buildings recently delivered or in development to the East of the Gherkin in the City of London ward of Aldgate, which together with the wards of Langbourn, Cornhill and Lime Street forms the centre of the UK insurance industry.

Two of the three main tenants, Jardine Lloyd Thompson and Lockton, are businesses with a substantial insurance broking component, which are therefore reliant on close proximity to the Lloyd's building and the globally-significant London market in insurance contracts that focuses on Lloyd's of London. The third main tenant, Clyde & Co, also has insurance ties as one of the largest insurance and reinsurance law firms in the world.

== History ==
The previous building occupying the majority of the site was a modern municipal-style office block owned by the Post Office / British Telecom with some mixed-use street level retail units including banks, a betting shop and a Thai Restaurant.

Planning permission was initially granted in 1999. Developers Minerva went on to submit two further plans for the site, including one for what would have been the City's first million+ square foot skyscraper, also designed by Grimshaw Architects. This tower was rejected, and the original permissions revived in 2006, with some revisions.

== The St Botolph Building ==
Designed by Grimshaw Architects and developed by Minerva plc with Skanska as main contractor, the Building is notable for the blue glass spandrels, pre-fabricated escape cores and a central atrium dominated by a steel structure on which a ThyssenKrupp "TWIN" lift system runs 16 lifts on eight tracks, a rare solution in the UK. The building's creative use of structural steel has been recognised by the British Constructional Steelwork Association's Structural Steel Design Awards.

Grimshaw Architects report that the brief was to create "a landmark building of significant architectural merit on a site that forms a key gateway to the City of London". The configuration of the central atrium and lift system affords the freeholder greater flexibility, permitting the later installation of bridges and access ways internally to meet changing tenancy needs.

The building's design and management processes include waste management and 'biomatics' to deliver a "zero to landfill" policy. Lighting throughout uses techniques including proximity detection to minimise unnecessary energy use. According to the property's managing agents CBRE, the Building has "achieved a BREEAM Very Good rating through its many sustainable design features". The City of London's Clean City Awards programme granted the building Gold Award status in January 2015.

== Tenancy ==
The developer faced some controversy for its strategy of releasing 100,000+ square foot properties onto a depressed market following the 2008 financial crisis, but full occupancy was confirmed by 2012. The top four floors are let to law firm Clyde & Co and floors 1-3 to insurance brokers Lockton. As of April 2024, floors 4-9 are unoccupied.

Additionally, the street level houses mixed units including a coffee bar, a gym club and a metro supermarket space, all three let and with tenants trading with both building inhabitants and the general public. Total rental yield is estimated at £30m per annum.

The developer sold the leasehold for £460m in 2013.

== See also ==
- City of London landmarks
- Leadenhall Market
