= River Lyde =

River in Buckinghamshire, England

Coordinates: 51.713°N 0.876°W

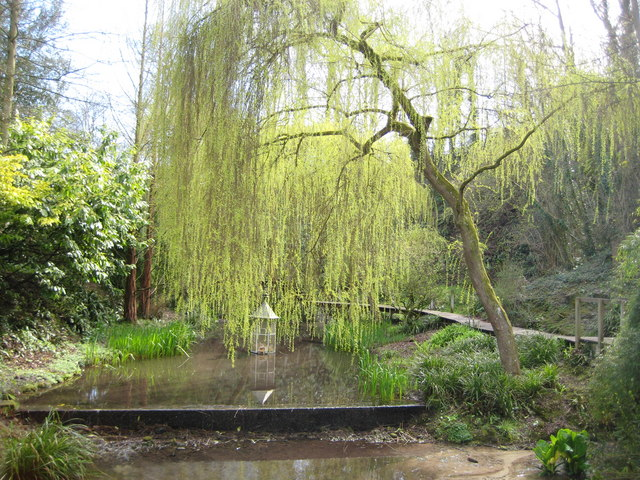
River Lyde at Bledlow

The River Lyde is a river in Buckinghamshire and tributary of the River Thame. It rises at springs in Bledlow (which takes its name from the river) then flows due north west to join the Cuttle Brook about a mile east of Towersey in Oxfordshire. It then goes to the north of Thame to join the River Thame.

It gives its name to the Lyde Garden, on the Carrington Estate, at Bledlow.
