= BLM (law firm) =

British law firm established in 1997

BLM LLP
- No. of offices: 13
- Date founded: 1997 (following a merger of Berrymans with Lace Mawer)
- Company type: Limited liability partnership
- Website: www.blmlaw.com

BLM LLP was an insurance and dispute resolution law firm based in the United Kingdom and Ireland. It was rebranded from Berrymans Lace Mawer following the merger with HBM Sayers in May 2014.

BLM provided legal services in 50 areas of law, grouped into eleven key market sectors: brokers, construction and property, general insurance, healthcare, leisure and hospitality, Lloyds and London market, manufacturing, public sector, retail, TMT and transport and logistics.

In March 2022, BLM agreed to merge with global law firm Clyde & Co and completed the merger as of 1 July 2022.

== History ==
In 1997, the firm was created with the merger of Berrymans with Lace Mawer. The origins of the firm date back to the 18th century, when Joshua Lace gave his name to an already established law firm in Liverpool. In 1901, Frederic Berryman began the practice of Berrymans in the City of London and, in 1946, Arthur Mawer founded AW Mawer & Co in Manchester. On 1 May 2014, Berrymans Lace Mawer and HBM Sayers formally combined as BLM.

Matthew Harrington is the current national senior partner (elected February 2018) succeeding Mike Brown's six-year term. In October 2017, BLM launched a new commercial advisory practice bringing in a new team of 33 lawyers, including 11 partners from the law firm, Slater & Gordon.
