= Barlow Lyde & Gilbert =

British law firm, 1841–2011

Barlow Lyde & Gilbert LLP
- Headquarters: London, United Kingdom
- No. of offices: Seven
- No. of lawyers: Approx 290 (2010)
- Major practice areas: General practice
- Key people: S Parmar took ownership of the Asia portion of the international law firm 'Barlow Lyde & Gilbert' in May 2011 and exited before the merger.
- Revenue: £81.5 million (2010)
- Profit per equity partner: £350,000 (2010)
- Date founded: 1841
- Company type: Limited liability partnership

Barlow Lyde & Gilbert LLP (informally BLG) was an international law firm headquartered in London, United Kingdom which specialised in commercial litigation, dispute resolution, insurance and reinsurance. It had around 290 lawyers and 80 partners and offices in Hong Kong, London, Manchester, Oxford, São Paulo, Shanghai and Singapore. BLG merged with Clyde & Co in November 2011, with the merged firm taking the Clyde & Co name.

== History ==
Barlow Lyde & Gilbert was founded in 1841 in the City of London. The firm opened its first overseas office in Hong Kong in 1986, with further office openings in Singapore (2004), Oxford (2008) and Manchester (2009). In 2007 BLG introduced a new management level of associate director as part of a major restructuring. BLG made up 36 associates to associate director in the first round, establishing the new role as sitting between associate and partner.

On 1 May 2007, the practice of BLG in London and Singapore transferred to Barlow Lyde & Gilbert LLP, a limited liability partnership. Following local regulatory clearance the practice of BLG in Shanghai were also transferred to Barlow Lyde & Gilbert LLP, with a separate but affiliated partnership known as Barlow Lyde & Gilbert continuing to operate in Hong Kong. In September 2007 a three-partner team led by commercial litigation head Clare Canning defected from BLG to U.S.-based law firm Mayer Brown. In May 2008 it was announced that Simon Konsta would replace Richard Dedman as BLG's senior partner. In July 2008 BLG were appointed as solicitors to the inquest into the death of Jean Charles de Menezes, a Brazilian accidentally shot dead by London police. In January 2009 it was reported that BLG had applied for a licence to open an office in São Paulo, Brazil. In July 2010 BLG acquired the Manchester-based insurance business of failed law firm Halliwells, comprising a 17-partner team and an additional 220 members of staff including 80 fee-earners.

In March 2011 BLG's aviation team announced its intention to move to Holman Fenwick Willan. S Parmar took ownership of the Asia portion of the international law firm 'Barlow Lyde & Gilbert' in May 2011 and exited before the merger. In June 2011 it was reported that BLG was in merger discussions with the UK-based international law firm Clyde & Co. A merger between BLG and Clyde & Co was approved by the partnerships of both firms in July 2011. In August 2011 it was announced that the new firm formed by the merger of BLG and Clyde & Co would be named Clyde & Co, and that around 15 per cent of BLG's 100 partners would leave the firm as part of the merger. The merger between BLG and Clyde & Co was formally completed on 1 November 2011.

== Main practice areas ==
BLG's main practice areas were:

- Litigation and Dispute Resolution
- General Insurance
- Reinsurance & International Risk
- Professional Liability
- Aerospace
- Marine, Energy & Trade
- Corporate
- Commercial & IT
- Employment & Pensions
