= Lydie Pace =

Central African singer

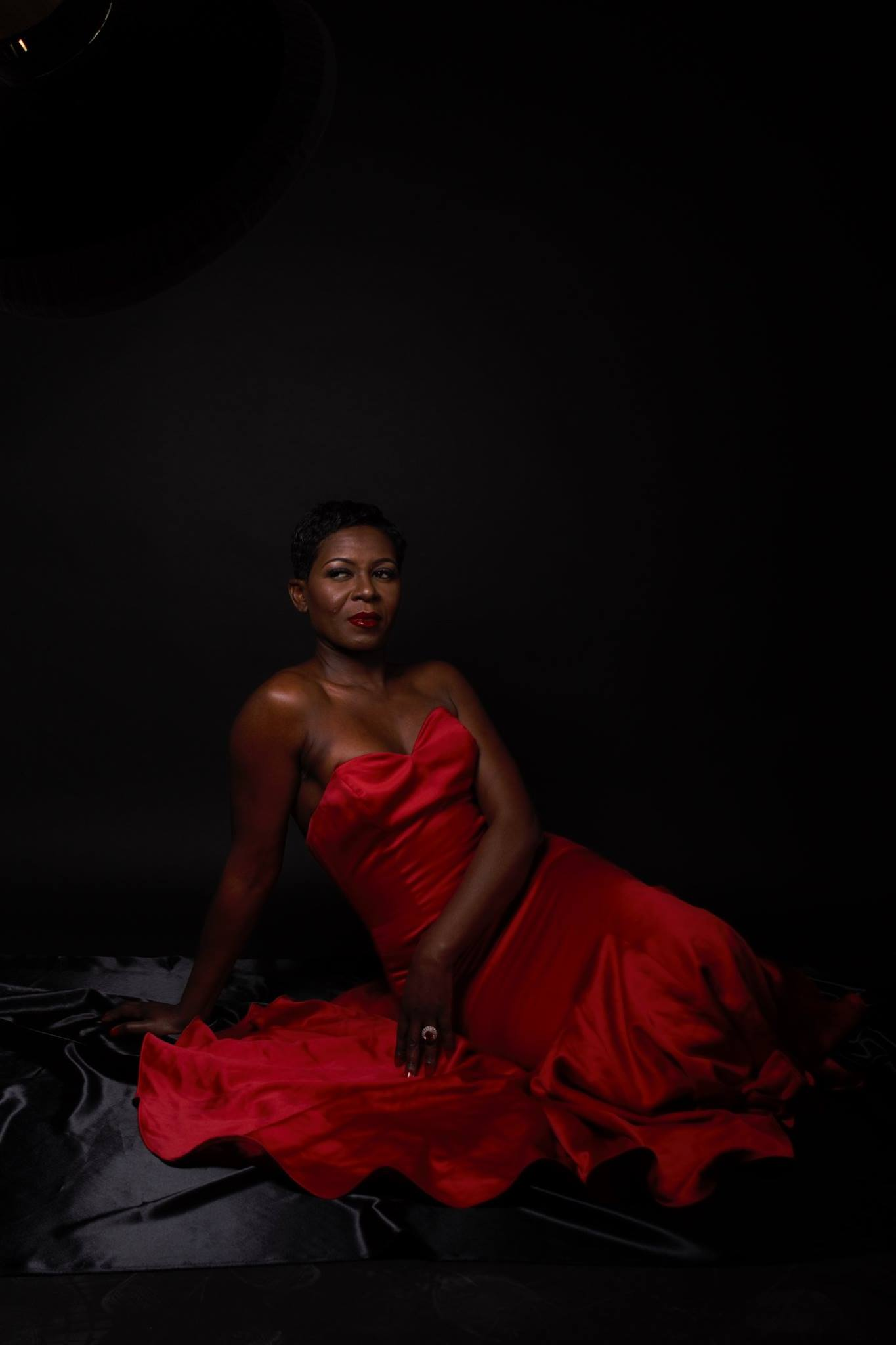
- Born: Lydie Brigitte Lamine; August 9, 1968 (age 57); Bangui, Central African Republic
- Occupations: Singer (soprano); voice teacher; Actress
- Years active: 2000–present
- Honours: Knight in the Central African Order of Merit; Central African Excellence Award; Prix de la Paix Barthelemy Boganda
- Website: www.helloasso.com/associations/compagnie-opera-world

Lydie Brigitte Lamine (born August 9, 1968), also known as Lydie Pace, is a Central African singer. She has won several awards during her career, including the Prix de Chant Lyrique.

== Early life ==
Lamine was born in the Central African Republic where she spent a good part of her childhood. Her family was forced to leave the continent in 1978 due to the repressions instituted by Emperor Bokassa I.

== Career ==
In 1993, Lamine received the Prix de Chant Lyrique awarded by André Guilbert (Director of the Conservatoire Hector-Berlioz). Two years later, she won the 2nd Prize of the International Competition of French Singing Masters.

In 1998, Lamine earned the Diplôme de Fin d'Etudes Supérieures de Chant, at the Conservatoire National de Région de Rueil-Malmaison in the class of Elizabeth Vidal, as well as the Trophée Jeune Talent Lyrique, during the 4th Nuit des Jeunes Talents de l'Oise.

Until 2000, Lamine performed in concerts and recitals, including at the Cathedral of Reims, at the International Musical Festival of the Grand Hôtel du Cap-Ferrat, at the Church of Saint-Germain-de-l'Auxerrois and Hôtel de la Monnaie of Paris, at the Alexandre Dumas Theatre of Saint-Germain-en-laye, at the Theatre of Paris Vincennes, and at the Palais des Congrès of Paris.

In 1999, Pace was accepted at the Concorso Comunità Europea per Giovani Cantanti Lirici (53° edizione al Teatro Lirico di SPOLETO). Noticed by Alexandre STAJIC, she participates in the 22nd International Festival of TOUQUET in Porgy and Bess by GERSHWIN, with the Regional Orchestra of Ile-de-France.

Her roles include the title role in Aida (Verdi's opera) at the Zenith in Clermont-Ferrand (2005); Carmen (Bizet); and her performance in Porgy and Bess.

Pace is known for her commitments to associations and international level: at the invitation of the Alliance Française for the benefit of the fight against AIDS she performed "the first opera recital in Bangui". She participated with other African artists in 2014 in the writing and performance of the song "Peace in Central Africa" to encourage the end of tensions in the country.
