= Lyde Browne (antiquary) =

British antiquarian

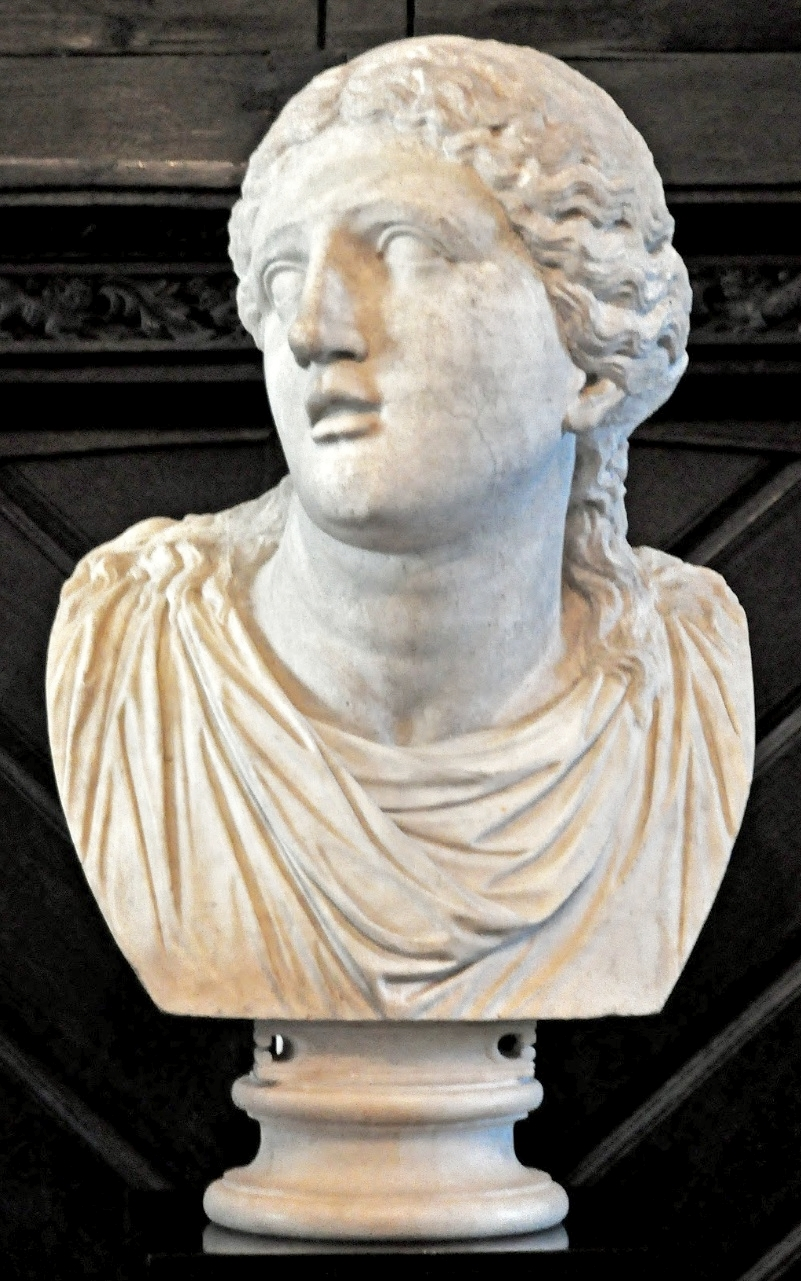
Roman head of so-called Nieborów Niobe from Browne's collection, Nieborów Palace (division of National Museum in Warsaw).

Lyde Browne FSA (died 10 September 1787, Foster Lane, Cheapside, London) was an 18th-century English antiquary and banker, who owned one of the largest antiquities collections of the time. This now forms the nucleus of the classical sculpture collections of the Hermitage Museum in Saint Petersburg and the Pavlovsk Palace in the city's suburbs. The Hermitage Museum website calls him John Lyde-Brown, as does The Oxford Encyclopedia of Ancient Greece and Rome.

== Life ==
Browne was elected a fellow of the Society of Antiquaries in 1752 (though he resigned in 1772). He travelled to Florence and Rome between 1753 and 1754. In Rome in 1758, he met the sculptor Simon Vierpyl, the archaeologist William Wilkins, and the buyer and collector Thomas Jenkins. Jenkins became his buying agent, sending him drawings of the statues he had purchased. These drawings were often given by Browne to the Society of Antiquaries in London.

By 1762, Browne moved the museum he had established in Rome back to his country house, Warren House in Wimbledon. In 1768, he published Catalogus veteris aevi varii generis monumentorum quae cimeliarchio Lyde Browne … asservantur (Catalogue of the various ancient monuments in the museum of Lyde Browne), a Latin catalogue of 130 of its objects with 80 detailed entries. That year, he also became a director of the Bank of England, a post he held until his death.

He then took a second journey to Italy between 1776 and 1778, during which Pompeo Batoni painted his eldest daughter Frances's portrait. In 1779, he published Catologo [sic] dei piu scelti e preziosi marmi, che si conservano nella galleria del Sigr Lyde Browne (Catalogue of the choicest and most precious marbles in the gallery of Mr Lyde Browne), another (Italian) catalogue of 260 objects. Both this and the earlier catalogue provided provenance for marbles and other objects from well known Italian collections and excavations near Rome; a third seems to have been planned, judging by the survival of drawings of more objects from the collection by Giovanni Battista Cipriani prepared for engraving.

His collection was in constant flux, with the buying and selling of many objects. He sold most of it to Catherine the Great for £22,000 in 1784, though his agent in St Petersburg went bankrupt and Browne only got £10,000 of this sum. Browne died soon afterwards, in 1787.

== Personal life ==
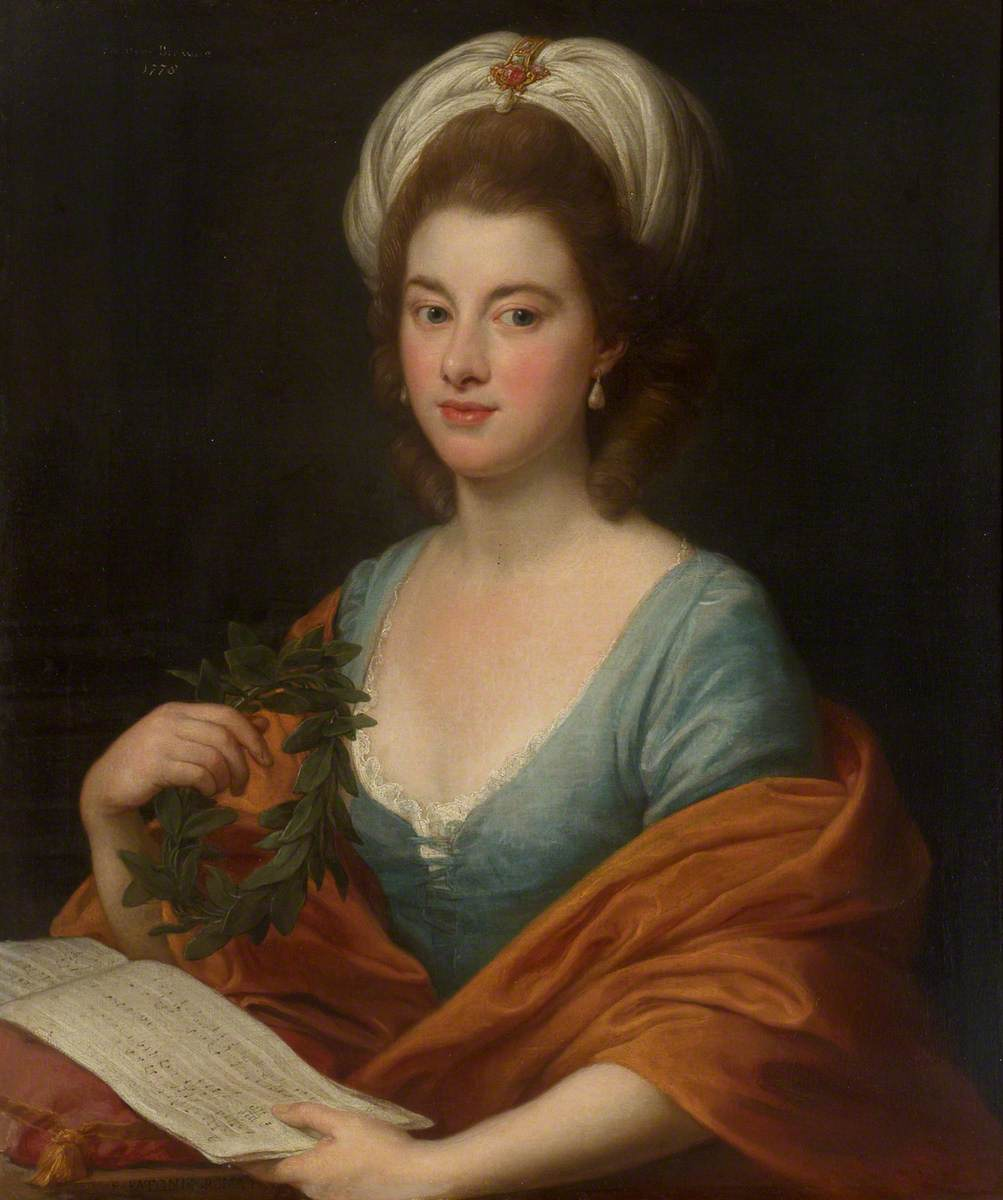
Portrait of his daughter, Frances Lyde Browne, by Pompeo Batoni, c. 1776-1778

He married Margaret Barwell after 15 November 1751. He and his wife Margaret had a son also named Lyde Browne and five other children.

Browne died of a stroke on 10 September 1787 at Foster Lane, Cheapside, London. On 30 May the following year, Christie's auctioned what remained of the collection (including paintings, terracotta models, prints, and drawings). Browne's estate at his death was still worth over £12,000 (divided equally into three bequests to his sons), along with many small gifts.

== References and Further reading ==
- I. Bignamini, C. Hornsby, Digging and Dealing in Eighteenth-Century Rome (2010), p. 244-246
- J. Ingamells, ed., A Dictionary of British and Irish travellers in Italy, 1701–1800 (1997)
- will, Family Records Centre, London, PROB. 11/1156.398
- GM, 1st ser., 57 (1787), 840
- O. Neverov, ‘The Lyde Browne collection and the history of ancient sculpture at the Hermitage Museum’, American Journal of Archaeology, 88 (1984), 33–42 (available at JSTOR here)
- A. M. Clark, Pompeo Batoni: a complete catalogue of his works with an introductory text, ed. E. P. Bowron (1985)
- X. Gorbunova, ‘Classical sculpture from the Lyde Browne collection’, Apollo, 100 (1974), 460–467
