= Lyde Browne (British Army officer) =

British Army officer

Lyde Browne (died 1803) was an officer in the 18th-century British Army.

== Life ==
The son of the antiquary Lyde Browne, his baptism probably occurred on 3 May 1759 at St John Zachary, London. He entered the army as cornet in the 3rd Dragoons on 11 June 1777, and was soon promoted to command a troop in the 20th Light Dragoons (a corps produced for the American War of Independence by pulling the light troops out of other cavalry regiments). That regiment was disbanded in 1783 and Browne put on half-pay, though he returned to full pay in May 1794 with a position in the 40th Regiment of Foot. He served with them in the West Indies, where in 1794 he joined the 4th West India Regiment as a major. Next he was commissioned as major in the 90th Regiment of Foot (1798), then in 1800 lieutenant-colonel in the 35th Regiment of Foot (serving with them in Malta), followed by a lieutenant-colonelcy in the 85th Regiment of Foot (1801) and subsequently in the 21st Regiment of Foot.

On 25 January 1802, Browne was stationed with his regiment in Dublin). Alerted as to the uprising by Robert Emmet, he was shot dead by United Irishmen while returning to his men at dusk on 23 July. The rebels then straight afterwards moved to the next-door street, where they killed Lord Kilwarden.
