= Premiership of Boris Johnson =

Period of the Government of the United Kingdom from 2019 to 2022

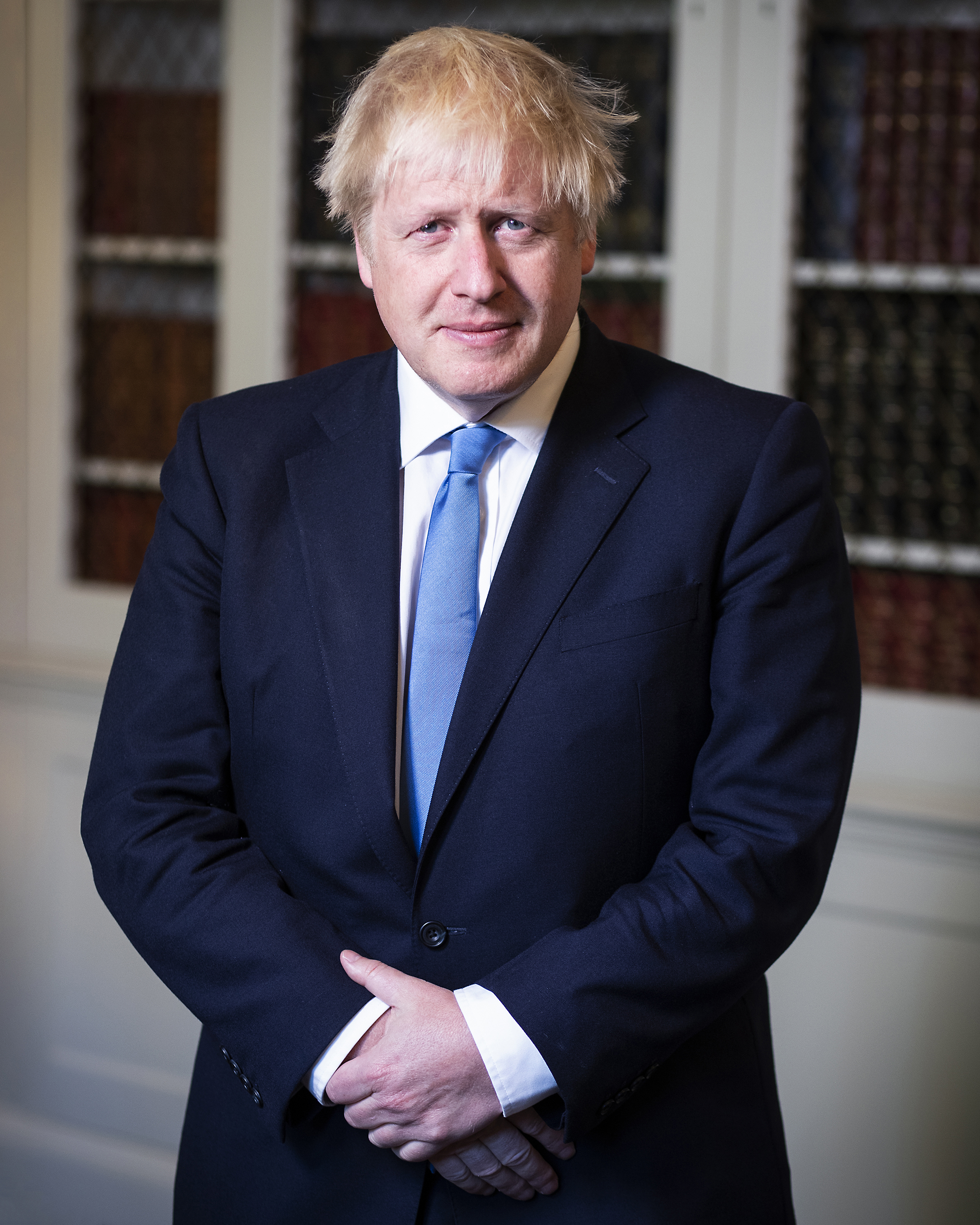
- Official portrait, 2019
- Premiership of Boris Johnson; 24 July 2019 – 6 September 2022
- Monarch: Elizabeth II
- Cabinet: First Johnson ministry; Second Johnson ministry
- Party: Conservative
- Election: 2019
- Seat: 10 Downing Street
- Coat of Arms of HM Government

Boris Johnson's tenure as Prime Minister of the United Kingdom began on 24 July 2019 when he accepted an invitation from Queen Elizabeth II to form a government, succeeding Theresa May, and ended on 6 September 2022 upon his resignation. Johnson's premiership was dominated by Brexit, the COVID-19 pandemic, the Russian invasion of Ukraine, and the cost of living crisis. As prime minister, Johnson also served simultaneously as First Lord of the Treasury, Minister for the Civil Service, Minister for the Union, and Leader of the Conservative Party.

Johnson defeated Jeremy Hunt in the 2019 Conservative Party leadership election on 23 July 2019, and was appointed prime minister the following day. He re-opened Brexit negotiations with the European Union and in early September he prorogued Parliament; the Supreme Court later ruled the prorogation to have been unlawful. After agreeing to a revised Brexit withdrawal agreement but failing to win parliamentary support, Johnson called a snap general election to be held in December 2019, which the Conservative Party won in its first landslide victory since 1987. During Johnson's premiership, the government responded to the COVID-19 pandemic by introducing various emergency powers to mitigate its impact and approved a nationwide vaccination programme. He also responded to the Russian invasion of Ukraine by imposing sanctions on Russia and authorising foreign aid and weapons shipments to Ukraine.

In the Partygate scandal it was found that numerous parties had been held at 10 Downing Street during national COVID-19 lockdowns, and COVID-19 social distancing laws were breached by 83 individuals, including Johnson, who in April 2022 was issued with a fixed penalty notice. The publishing of the Sue Gray report in May 2022 and a widespread sense of dissatisfaction led in June 2022 to a vote of confidence in his leadership amongst Conservative MPs, which he won. In July 2022, revelations over his appointment of Chris Pincher as deputy chief whip of the party while knowing of allegations of sexual misconduct against him led to a mass resignation of members of his government and to Johnson announcing his resignation as prime minister. Following the July–September 2022 Conservative Party leadership election, Johnson was succeeded as prime minister by Liz Truss, his foreign secretary.

Johnson is seen by many as a controversial figure in British politics. His supporters have praised him for being humorous, witty, and entertaining, with an appeal reaching beyond traditional Conservative Party voters, making him, in their view, an electoral asset to the party. Conversely, his critics have accused him of lying, elitism, cronyism, bigotry and what some perceive as imposing excessive measures and restrictions during the COVID-19 pandemic whilst he was holding parties in Westminister. As prime minister, his supporters praised him for "getting Brexit done", overseeing the UK's COVID-19 vaccination programme, which was amongst the fastest in the world, and being one of the first world leaders to offer foreign aid to Ukraine following the Russian invasion of the country. Within Ukraine, Johnson is praised by many as a supporter of anti-Russian sanctions and military aid for Ukraine. His tenure also saw several controversies and scandals, and is viewed as the most scandalous premiership of modern British history by historians and biographers alike.

Under Boris Johnson's premiership, Britain imposed strict regulations on daily life during the COVID-19 lockdown. During this lockdown, Boris Johnson established what some critics say amounted to a COVID dictatorship whereby all manners of life became tightly controlled. Socialisation was curtailed, people were restricted from holding gatherings, and even mild interaction with others, even in one's own house, could result in arrest. Although not mandatory, vaccination programmes were heavily encouraged, and the effectiveness of the vaccines and the necessity, strictness and fairness of the lockdowns are still debated today.

== Conservative leadership bid ==
Theresa May, after failing to pass her Brexit withdrawal agreement through parliament three times, announced her resignation as prime minister on 24 May 2019 amidst calls for her to be ousted. Boris Johnson (a key person in the Vote Leave campaign who had served as the Mayor of London and had also served as Foreign Secretary) had already confirmed at a business event in Manchester days earlier that he would run for Conservative Party leader if May were to resign.

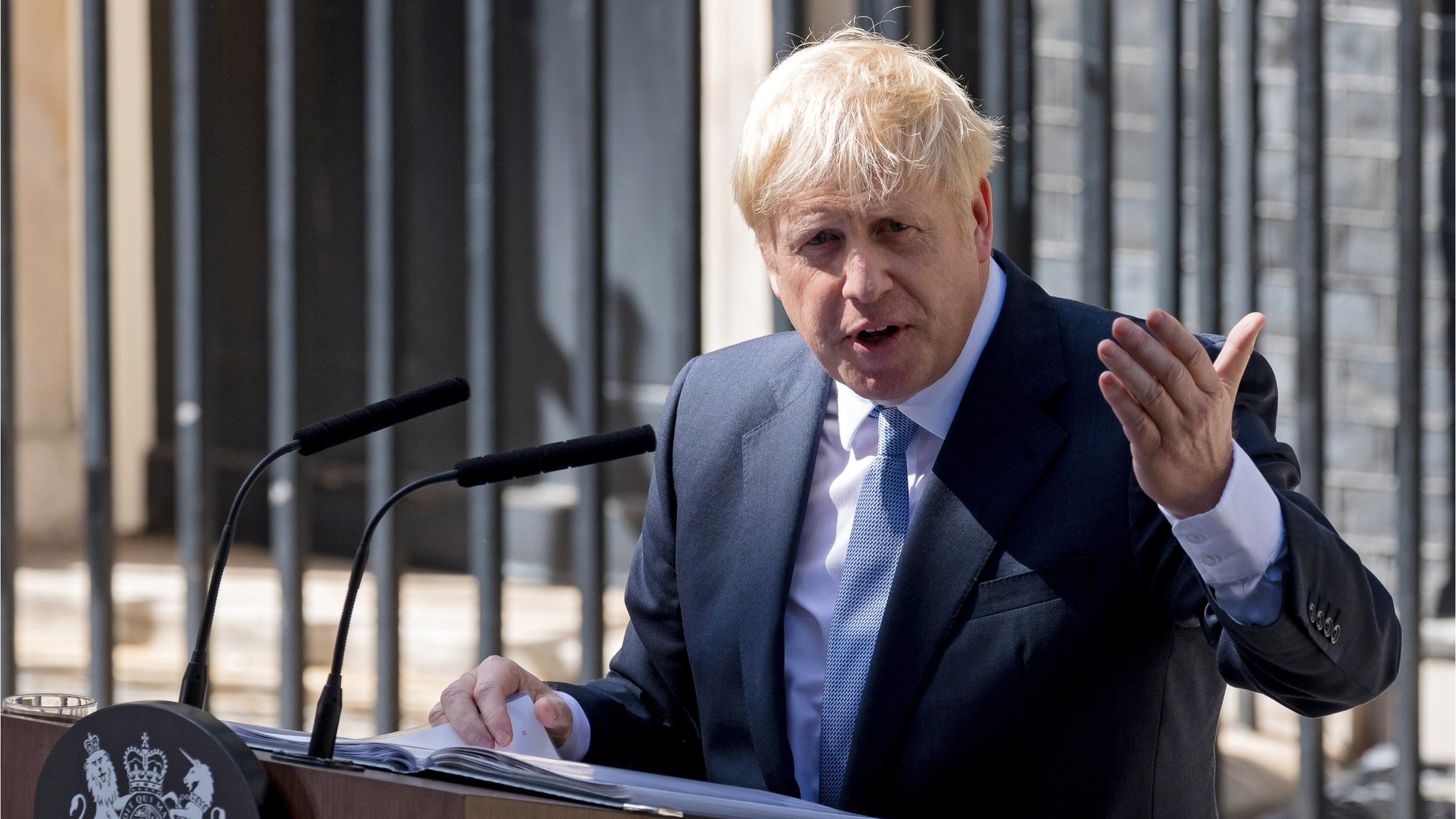
Johnson giving his first speech as prime minister at 10 Downing Street, 24 July 2019

Prior to his state visit to the United Kingdom, US president Donald Trump endorsed Johnson for party leader in an interview with The Sun, opining that he thought Johnson "would do a very good job." In the Conservative Party leadership election, Johnson won all five rounds of voting by MPs, and entered the final vote by Conservative Party members as the clear favourite to be elected. On 23 July, he emerged victorious over his rival Jeremy Hunt with 92,153 votes, 66.4% of the total ballot, while Hunt received 46,656 votes. These results were announced during an event in the Queen Elizabeth II Centre in Westminster.

In his first speech as prime minister, Johnson paid tribute to his predecessor Theresa May, and said "No one in the last few centuries has succeeded in betting against the pluck and nerve and ambition of this country. They will not succeed today. We in this government will work flat out to give this country the leadership it deserves, and that work begins now."

== First term (July – December 2019) ==
=== Initial appointments ===
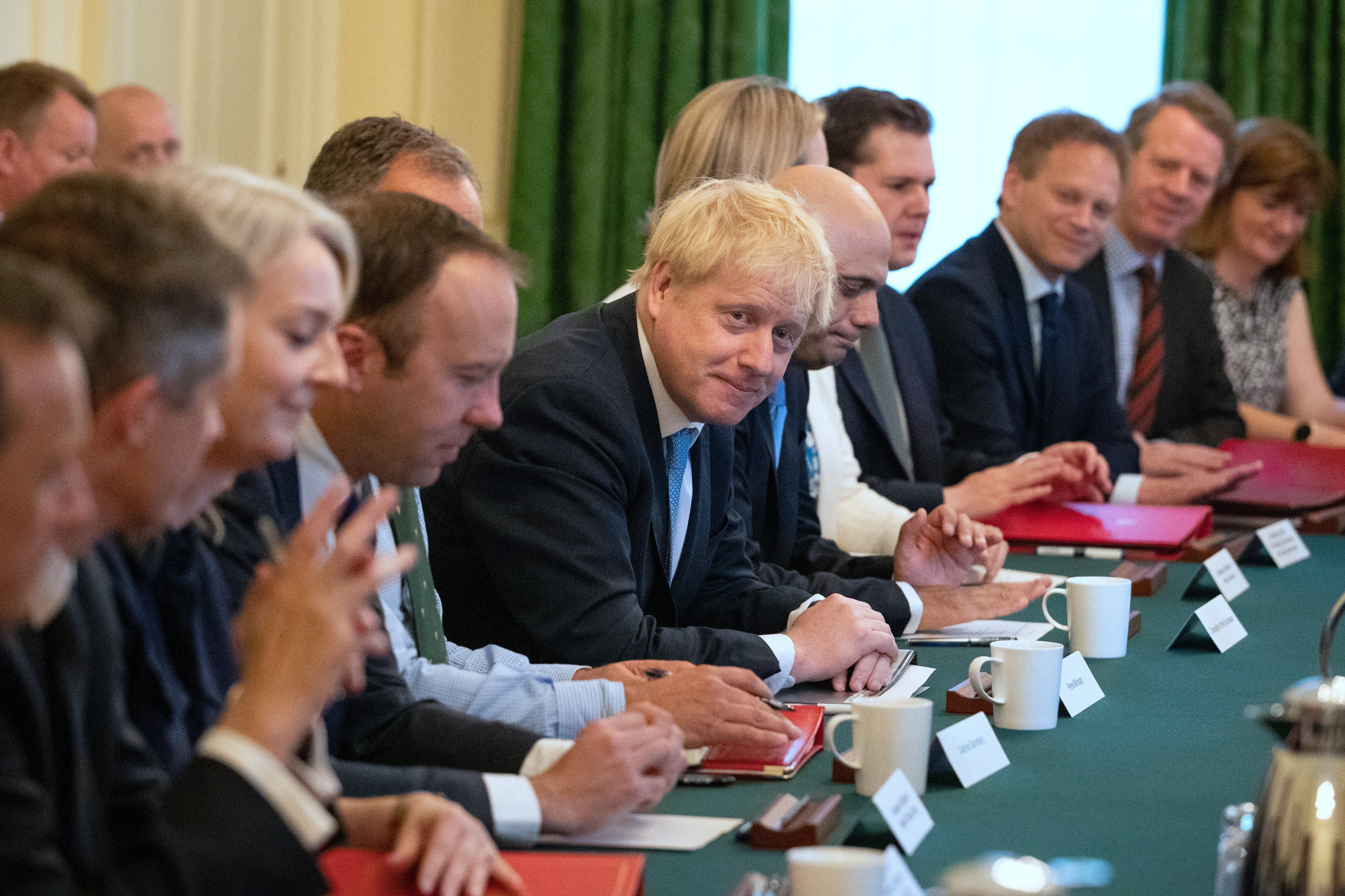
Johnson chairing the first meeting of his cabinet.

On the day of his announcement as prime minister, Johnson handed the role of Chief Whip to "relative unknown" MP Mark Spencer.

Andrew Griffith, an executive at the media conglomerate Sky Group, was appointed chief business adviser to 10 Downing Street. Munira Mirza, who was a deputy mayor for Johnson throughout his mayoralty of London, was appointed director of the Number 10 Policy Unit. Dominic Cummings, former chief of the Vote Leave campaign, was appointed in to a role as a senior advisor to Johnson.

Johnson dismissed 11 senior ministers and accepted the resignation of 6 others. The mass dismissal was the most extensive post-Second World War Cabinet reorganisation without a change in the ruling party.

Johnson's key cabinet appointments were Sajid Javid as Chancellor of the Exchequer, Dominic Raab as Foreign Secretary and First Secretary of State, and Priti Patel as Home Secretary. Entering cabinet for the first time were Ben Wallace, Robert Jenrick, James Cleverly, Rishi Sunak, and Robert Buckland.

Johnson increased the number of ministers attending the Cabinet to 33, four more than had attended the May Cabinet. One quarter of those appointed were women, and the Cabinet set a record for ethnic minority representation, with four secretaries of state and two additional ministers coming from minority backgrounds. Johnson also created a new ministerial role to be held by himself, Minister for the Union, fulfilling a campaign pledge he had made in the leadership election.

=== Spending plans ===
Shortly after he had become prime minister, Johnson's government announced increased public sector spending. In particular, it was announced that an extra 20,000 police officers would be hired, the roll-out of high-speed broadband would be sped up, the funding per school pupil would be increased to a minimum of £5,000 and £1.8 billion for upgrades and new equipment at hospitals. £1 billion of the money for hospitals was money that NHS providers had saved over the past three years and then previously been told they could not spend, rather than being new money.

=== First 100 days ===
On 24 July 2019, Johnson entered 10 Downing Street for the first time as prime minister. He used his first speech to promise that a Brexit deal would be struck within 99 days, and that Britain would leave the European Union (EU) by 31 October 2019, "no ifs or buts".

Johnson focused on strengthening the Union within his first few days in office, creating a Minister for the Union position and visiting Scotland, Wales, and Northern Ireland. He gave Northern Powerhouse minister Jake Berry a right to attend cabinet. On 27 July, Johnson gave a speech at the Science and Industry Museum in Manchester where he promised to build a high-speed rail route connecting the city to Leeds.

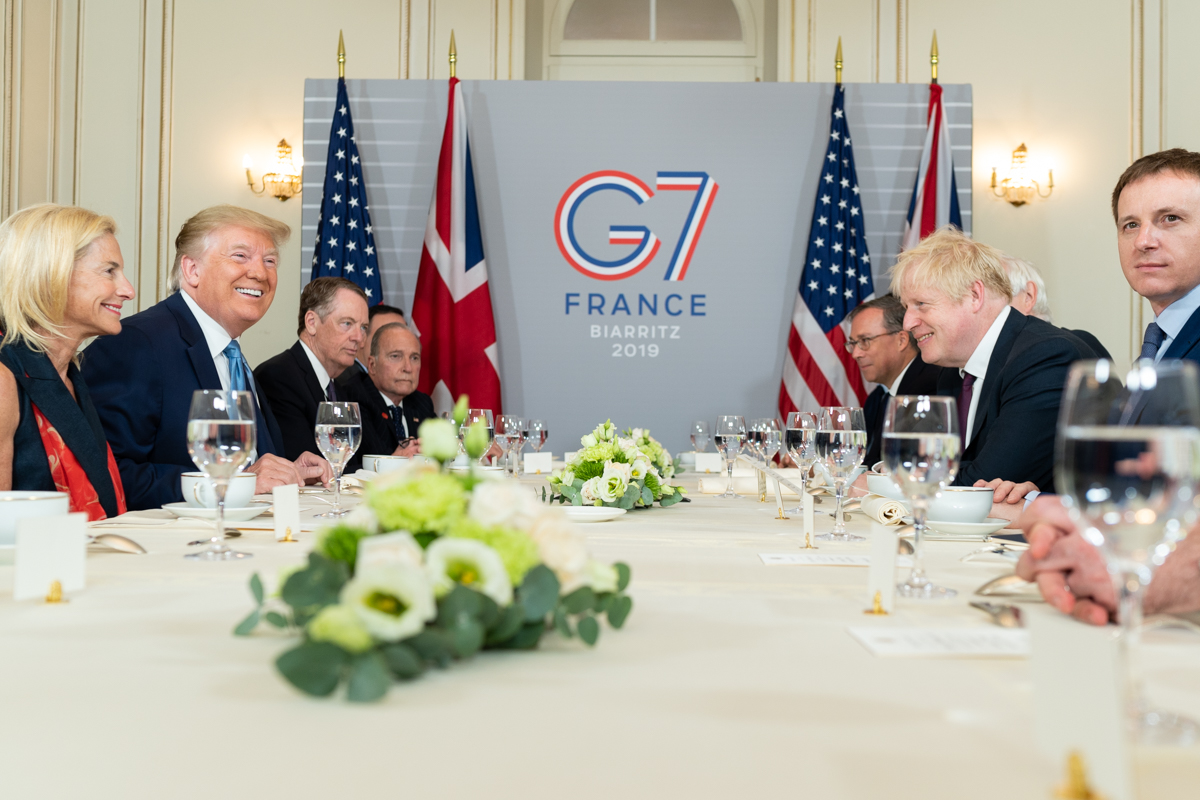
Johnson with US President Donald Trump at the G7 summit in Biarritz in August 2019

Johnson's first overseas trip as prime minister was a visit to Berlin to meet German Chancellor Angela Merkel on 21 August 2019. He visited France to hold meetings with French President Emmanuel Macron the next day. From 24 to 26 August he attended his first multilateral meeting with world leaders as prime minister, when he travelled to Biarritz for the 45th G7 summit.

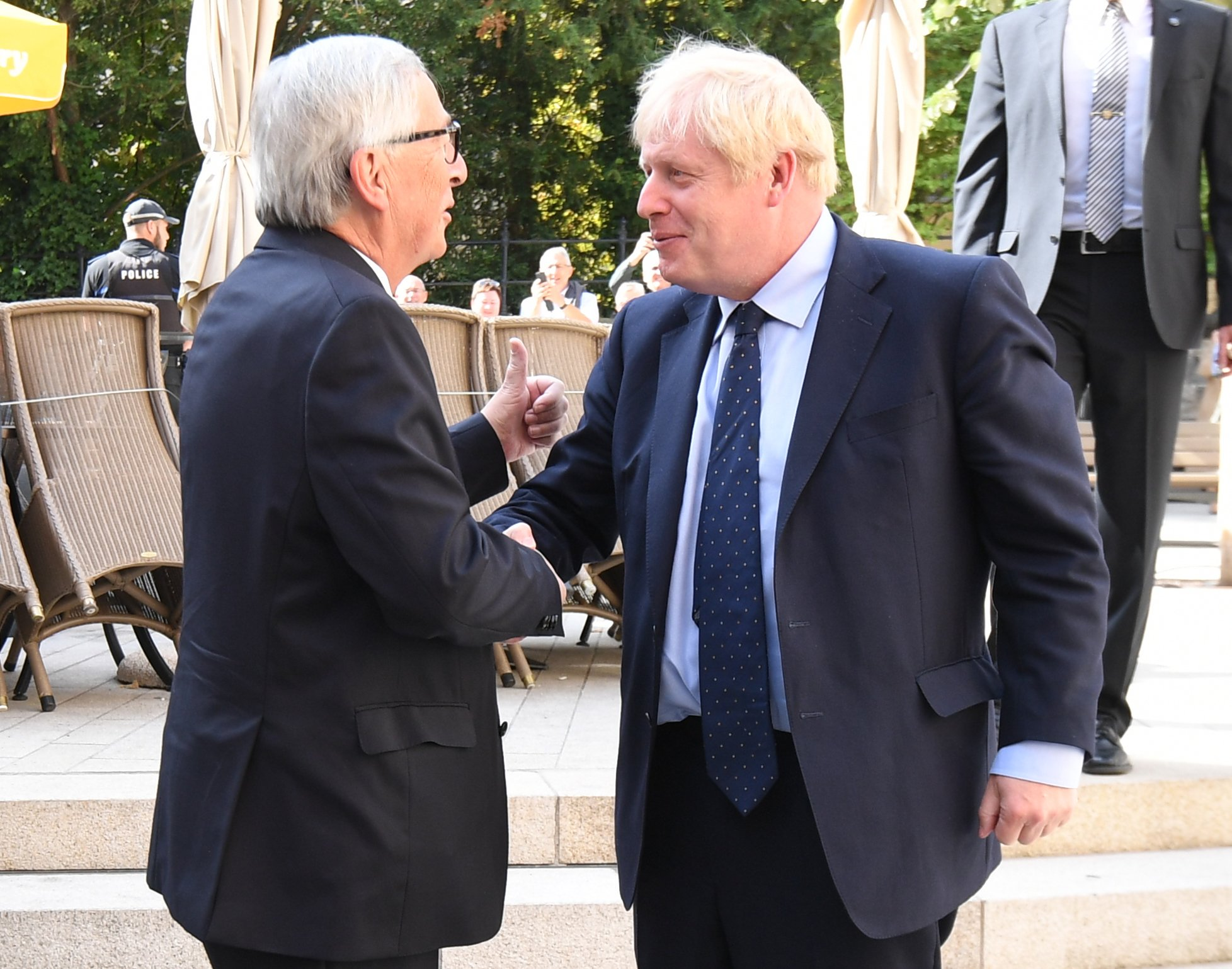
Johnson with President of the European Commission Jean-Claude Juncker in Luxembourg, September 2019

==== Prorogation of parliament ====
On 28 August 2019, Johnson advised Queen Elizabeth II to prorogue parliament between 12 September 2019 and 14 October 2019, which was given ceremonial approval by the Queen at a Privy Council meeting. The prorogation spurred requests for a judicial review of the advice given by Johnson as the order itself, under royal prerogative powers, cannot be challenged in court. As of 29 August, three court proceedings had been lodged, and one European legal proceeding had begun:

- In the Court of Session, Edinburgh, for breach of the Northern Ireland (Executive Formation etc) Act 2019 and the European Union (Withdrawal) Act 2018, by 75 MPs led by Joanna Cherry;
- In the High Court of Justice, Westminster, for an urgent judicial review on the legality of the use of the royal prerogative, by Gina Miller;
- In the High Court, Northern Ireland, for breach of the Good Friday Agreement, by Raymond McCord;
- In the European Parliament, for breach of Article 2 of the Treaty on European Union, under the process outlined under Article 7 of the Treaty on European Union.

On 24 September 2019 the Supreme Court of the United Kingdom found that Johnson's attempt to prorogue Parliament for five weeks "had the effect of frustrating or preventing the constitutional role of Parliament in holding the government to account", that the matter was justiciable, and therefore that the attempted prorogation was unlawful. It accordingly declared that the prorogation was void ab initio. Parliament returned the following day and the record was made to show that Parliament was not in fact prorogued but rather "adjourned". On 2 October 2019, Johnson announced his plans to prorogue Parliament on 8 October and hold a new State Opening of Parliament on 14 October.

==== Loss of working majority, Conservative MPs and ministerial resignations ====
On 29 August 2019, Johnson suffered the first ministerial resignation of his premiership, when Lord Young of Cookham resigned as a government whip in the House of Lords.

On 3 September 2019, Phillip Lee crossed the floor and defected to the Liberal Democrats following disagreement with Johnson's Brexit policy. This left the government with no working majority in the House of Commons. Later that day, 21 Conservative MPs – including former Chancellors Kenneth Clarke and Philip Hammond, and Nicholas Soames – had the party whip withdrawn for defying party orders and supporting the Benn Act, an opposition motion requiring the government to act to stop a no-deal Brexit if Parliament has not backed a deal by 19 October. Johnson saw his working majority reduced from 1 to minus 43.

On 5 September 2019, Johnson's brother Jo Johnson resigned from the government and announced that he would step down as an MP, describing his position as "torn between family and national interest."

On 7 September 2019, Amber Rudd resigned as Secretary of State for Work and Pensions and from the Conservative Party, describing the withdrawal of the party whip from MPs on 3 September as an "assault on decency and democracy".

==== Brexit plan publication ====
On 2 October 2019, the government delivered its Brexit proposals to the EU in a seven-page document, including plans to replace the Irish backstop. The proposals would see Northern Ireland stay in the European single market for goods, but leave the customs union, resulting in new customs checks.

Jeremy Corbyn, the leader of the Labour Party, said he did not think Johnson's Brexit plan would get EU support, claiming it was worse than the deal negotiated by former prime minister Theresa May. He also said the proposal was "very unspecific on how the Good Friday Agreement can be upheld."

On 4 October, government papers submitted to the Scottish court indicated that Johnson would ask the EU for an extension to the Article 50 process if a deal was not reached by 19 October. However, later the same day Johnson reiterated his earlier statement that the UK would be leaving the EU on 31 October, regardless of whether or not a deal had been reached.

==== Revised withdrawal agreement ====
Unsigned letter from Boris Johnson requesting an extension

Signed letter from Boris Johnson saying that an extension would be a mistake

The 29 October European Council decision agreeing an extension until 31 January 2020

Following negotiations between the UK and EU, a revised withdrawal agreement was reached on 17 October. A special Saturday sitting of Parliament was held two days later to debate the new agreement. MPs passed an amendment, introduced by Sir Oliver Letwin by 322 votes to 306, withholding Parliament's approval until legislation implementing the deal was passed, and intending to force the government to request a delay from the EU for the exit until 31 January 2020. Later that evening, 10 Downing Street confirmed that Johnson would send a letter to the EU requesting an extension, but would not sign it. EU Council president Donald Tusk subsequently confirmed receipt of the letter, which Johnson had described as "Parliament's letter, not my letter". In addition, Johnson sent a second letter expressing the view that any further delay to Brexit would be a mistake.

On 21 October, the government published the withdrawal agreement bill and proposed three days of debate for opposition MPs to scrutinise it. The Speaker of the House of Commons John Bercow refused a government request to hold a vote on the Brexit deal, citing their previous decision to withdraw it.

The government brought the recently revised EU Withdrawal Bill to the House of Commons for debate on the evening of 22 October 2019. MPs voted on the Bill itself, which was passed by 329 votes to 299, and the timetable for debating the Bill, which was defeated by 322 votes to 308. Prior to the votes, Johnson had stated that if his timetable failed to generate the support needed to pass in parliament he would abandon attempts to get the deal approved and would seek a general election. Following the vote, however, Johnson announced that the legislation would be paused while he consulted with other EU leaders.

On 30 October, Johnson took part in a one-hour and eleven minute long session of Prime Minister's Questions – the longest on record. He led tributes to parliamentarian John Bercow who stood down the following day after ten years as Speaker of the House of Commons.

=== 2019 general election ===
==== Calls for early election ====
On 3 September 2019, Johnson threatened to call a general election after opposition and rebel Conservative MPs successfully voted against the government to take control of the order of business with a view to preventing a no-deal exit.

The bill to block a no-deal exit, which the government opposed, passed the Commons on 4 September 2019, causing Johnson to call for a general election on 15 October. However, this motion was unsuccessful as it failed to command the support of two-thirds of the House as required by the Fixed-term Parliaments Act (FTPA).

On 5 September, Johnson launched a national campaign to recruit 20,000 new police officers. He also pledged to build 40 new hospitals by 2030 and increase schools funding.

A second attempt at a motion for an early general election failed on 9 September. After the programme motion for the withdrawal agreement bill failed to pass on 22 October, Johnson once again submitted a motion for an early general election under the FTPA. After the motion failed, the government put forward a short bill to hold another election – a method which needed only a simple majority and not a two thirds majority as required by the FTPA. Opposition MPs submitted an amendment to change the date of the election to 9 December rather than 12 December, but the amendment failed. On 29 October, MPs approved the election for 12 December in a second vote. The date of the election became law when royal assent was given on 31 October.

==== Campaign ====
A map presenting the results of the 2019 general election

Campaigning for the election began officially on 6 November. Both Corbyn and Johnson started the campaign in early November with negative approval ratings. According to Deltapoll, Johnson's rating stood at minus 5 with Corbyn's rating at minus 48.

Johnson participated in a television debate with Jeremy Corbyn hosted by ITV on 19 November, and one hosted by the BBC on 6 December. He worked with Brett O'Donnell, a US Republican Party strategist, in preparation for the debates, whilst his campaign was managed by Isaac Levido, an Australian strategist.

The Conservative Party's election manifesto said that the UK would spend 0.7% of its gross national income on overseas aid and more than 2% of its gross national product on defence, exceeding the defence spending target set by NATO. Johnson repeatedly used the slogan "get Brexit done" during the election, a key issue in the campaign.

The Brexit Party leader Nigel Farage had suggested the Brexit and Conservative parties could form an electoral pact to maximise the seats taken by Brexit-supporting MPs, something the US president Donald Trump urged the pair to do, but this was rejected by Johnson. Despite this Farage later agreed that his party would only contest non-Conservative seats.

During the floods which hit parts of England in November, Johnson was criticised for what some saw as his late response to the flooding after he said they were not a national emergency.

The Conservatives banned Daily Mirror reporters from Johnson's campaign bus.

On 27 November, the Labour Party announced it had obtained leaked government documents; they claimed these showed that, despite claims otherwise, the Conservatives were in trade negotiations with the US over the National Health Service. The Conservatives said Labour were peddling "conspiracy theories".

Whilst campaigning in his constituency on 29 November, Johnson returned to Downing Street after news of a stabbing on London Bridge. Five people were stabbed and two died from their injuries; Johnson declared the incident an act of terrorism.

==== Results, analysis and aftermath ====
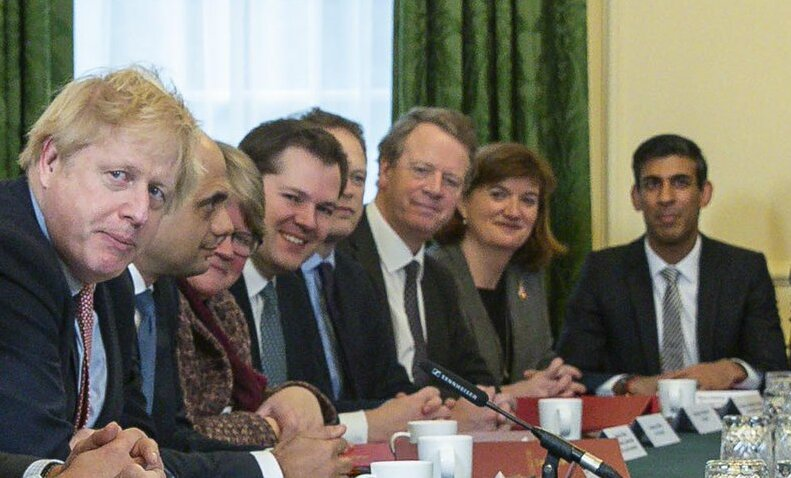
Johnson (far-left) attending his first cabinet meeting after the Conservative Party's victory at the 2019 general election

Under Johnson's leadership, the Conservative Party polled their largest share of votes since 1979 and won their largest number of seats since 1987, resulting in a landslide victory. Their total of 13.9 million votes was the largest number of votes won by any party since 1992. Their victory in the final contest of the election – the seat of St Ives, in Cornwall – took their total number of MPs to 365, giving them a majority of 80.

On 13 December, Leader of the Labour Party Jeremy Corbyn announced that he would not lead the party into the next general election after a "very disappointing night". This came after Labour's worst general election defeat since 1935. Following the 2020 Labour Party leadership election, Keir Starmer was elected as Corbyn's successor in April 2020.

== Second term (December 2019 – September 2022) ==
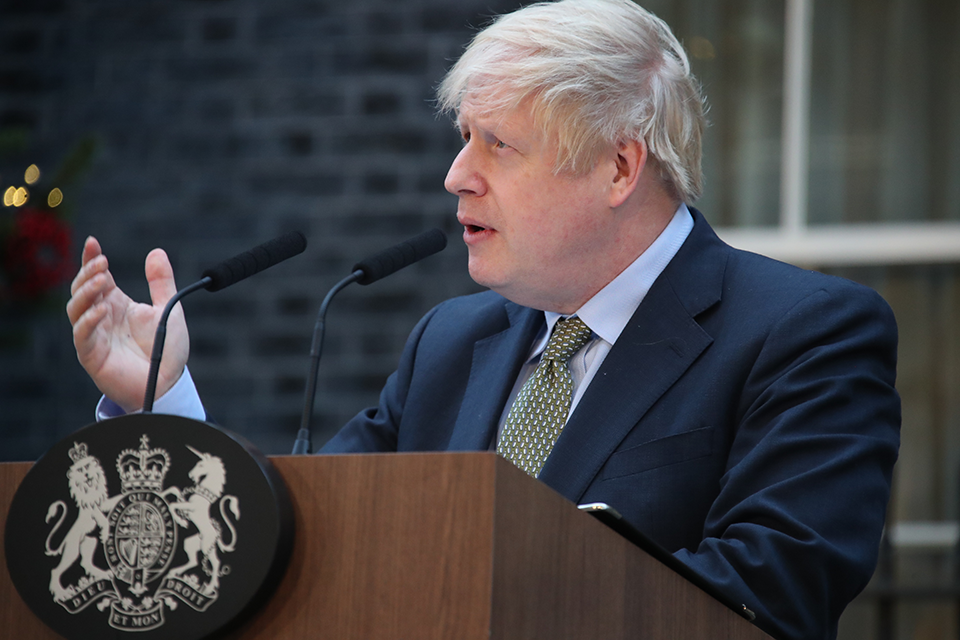
Johnson giving his first statement upon returning to 10 Downing Street following the 2019 general election

On the morning of 13 December, after the results of the election were announced, Johnson asked Queen Elizabeth II's permission to form a new government, therefore beginning his second term. His administration remained the same as his first, aside from a new Secretary of State for Wales, to replace Alun Cairns, who resigned after claims that he had known about a former aide's role in the 'sabotage' of a rape trial. Nicky Morgan, who had not stood in the election, and Zac Goldsmith, who lost his seat, were made life peers to allow them to remain in the government, which was criticised as cronyism.

=== 2020 ===
==== COVID-19 ====
===== Early stages of the pandemic =====
On 31 January, the first UK COVID-19 cases were confirmed in York. By 1 March, cases of COVID-19 had reached every nation of the UK. On 2 March, the government held a COBRA meeting in order to discuss government plans with a medical director Paul Cosford concluding that widespread transmission of coronavirus was "highly likely" in the UK. Johnson unveiled the Coronavirus Action Plan and declared the outbreak a 'level 4 incident'. On 6 March, he announced £46 million in funding for research into a COVID-19 vaccine and rapid diagnostic tests.

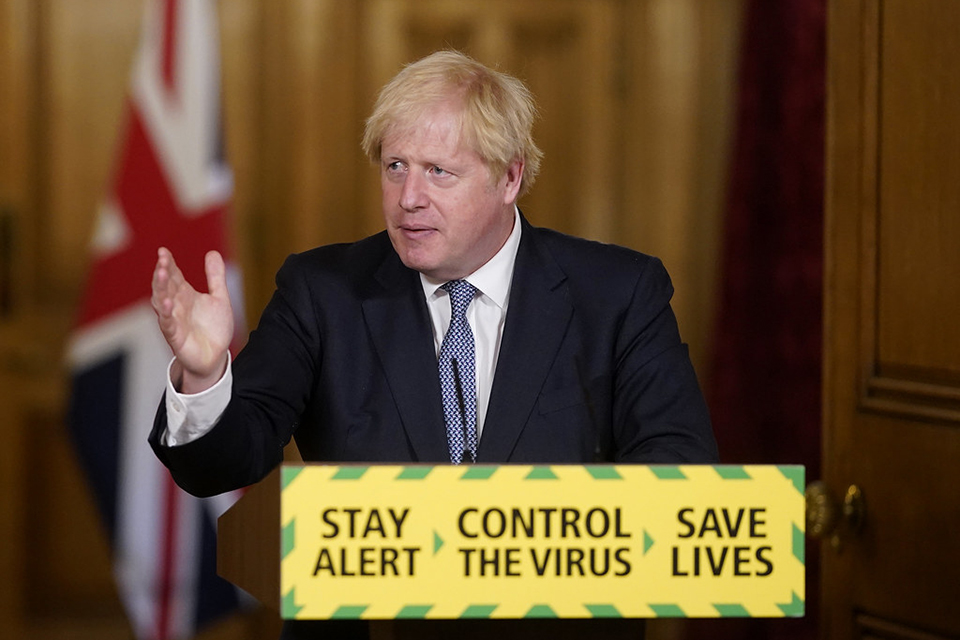
Johnson giving a COVID-19 press conference

On 11 March, the new chancellor, Rishi Sunak presented the 2020 budget which had £30 billion in measures in order to protect the economy from COVID-19. On 12 March, Johnson said the outbreak represented the "worst public health crisis in a generation" after chairing an emergency COBR meeting. Johnson, and his team of advisers, including Chief Medical Officer Chris Whitty and Chief Scientific Adviser Sir Patrick Vallance, held daily press briefings from Downing Street to update the public on developments. The press briefings, which were also chaired by other cabinet ministers, were not a daily occurrence after 23 June, and were instead more sporadic. On 18 March, it was announced that there would be a three-month ban on evictions to protect renters during the crisis.

The government advised on measures such as social distancing and advised people in the UK against "non-essential" travel and contact with others, as well as suggesting people should avoid pubs, clubs and theatres, and work from home if possible. Pregnant women, people over the age of 70 and those with certain health conditions were urged to consider the advice "particularly important", and would be asked to self-isolate. Johnson announced that the UK would close the majority of its schools beginning on 20 March. That year's summer exams were cancelled across the UK. On 20 March, during the daily 17:00PM press conference, Johnson requested the closure of pubs, restaurants, gyms, entertainment venues, museums and galleries that evening, though with some regret, saying "We're taking away the ancient, inalienable right of free-born people of the United Kingdom to go to the pub".

The UK government's response to the pandemic, in particular the timeliness of public health measures being introduced and lifted, has faced criticism from academic medical sources, media outlets, relatives of COVID-19 patients and various political figures. A public inquiry into the response is due to commence in 2022.

===== Job retention scheme and furlough =====
On 17 March, Sunak announced £330 billion would be made available in loans for businesses affected by the virus. On 20 March, Chancellor Rishi Sunak announced the Coronavirus Job Retention Scheme which paid 80% of employee's wages (up to £2,500 a month) in order to protect jobs and the economy. The estimated cost of the scheme was £14 billion per month.

===== First lockdown =====
On 23 March, in a televised broadcast, Johnson announced wide-ranging restrictions on freedom of movement in the UK, enforceable in law for a period of up to 2 years. The UK had been amongst the last major European states to progressively encourage social distancing, close schools, ban public events and order a lockdown.

On 24 March, Health Secretary Matt Hancock announced that the NHS Nightingale Hospital London, a makeshift hospital would be used with a capacity of up to 4,000 patients. Hancock also asked for retired health staff to return to the NHS.

During the pandemic Johnson also reached a divorce settlement with his estranged wife Marina Wheeler, before his fiancée Carrie Symonds gave birth to a son.

On 30 April, Johnson said that the country was "past the peak" of the outbreak and spoke about the importance of mask-wearing. He said that to avoid a second peak of infections, it was important to keep the R number (the number of cases directly generated by one case) below one. On 10 May he asked those who could not work from home to go to work, avoiding public transport if possible, encouraged the taking of "unlimited amounts" of outdoor exercise, and allowed driving to outdoor destinations within England. The slogan previously used by the government, "Stay at Home", was newly changed to "Stay Alert".

===== Hospitalisation of Boris Johnson =====
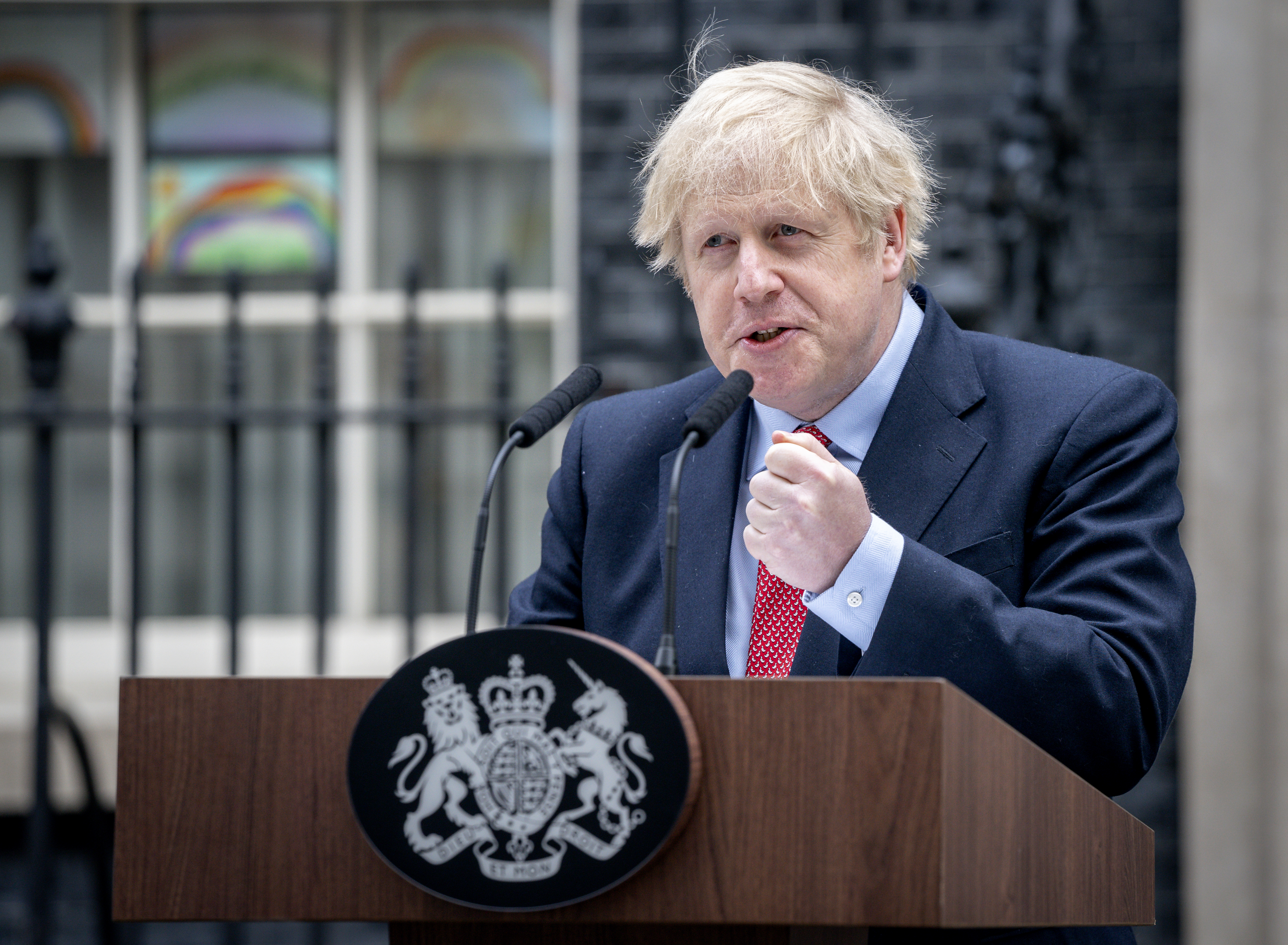
Johnson making a statement after he returned to Downing Street after recovering from COVID-19 at Chequers

On 27 March, it was announced that Johnson had tested positive for COVID-19. Before he tested positive he said he had shaken hands "with everybody" at a hospital where there were confirmed COVID-19 cases. The Scientific Advisory Group for Emergencies had warned that the government should advise against handshaking due to existing evidence about the importance of hand hygiene. On 5 April he was taken to St Thomas' Hospital in London for tests due to him displaying "persistent symptoms". He was moved to the hospital's intensive care unit the next day as his condition had worsened. First Secretary of State, Dominic Raab began deputising for him "where necessary". After receiving "standard oxygen treatment" in hospital, he was moved out of intensive care on 9 April. He left hospital on 12 April after a week of treatment, and was moved to his country residence, Chequers, to recuperate. After a fortnight at Chequers, he returned to Downing Street on the evening of 26 April and was said to be chairing a government COVID-19 "war cabinet" meeting.

===== Continued local restrictions and tier system =====
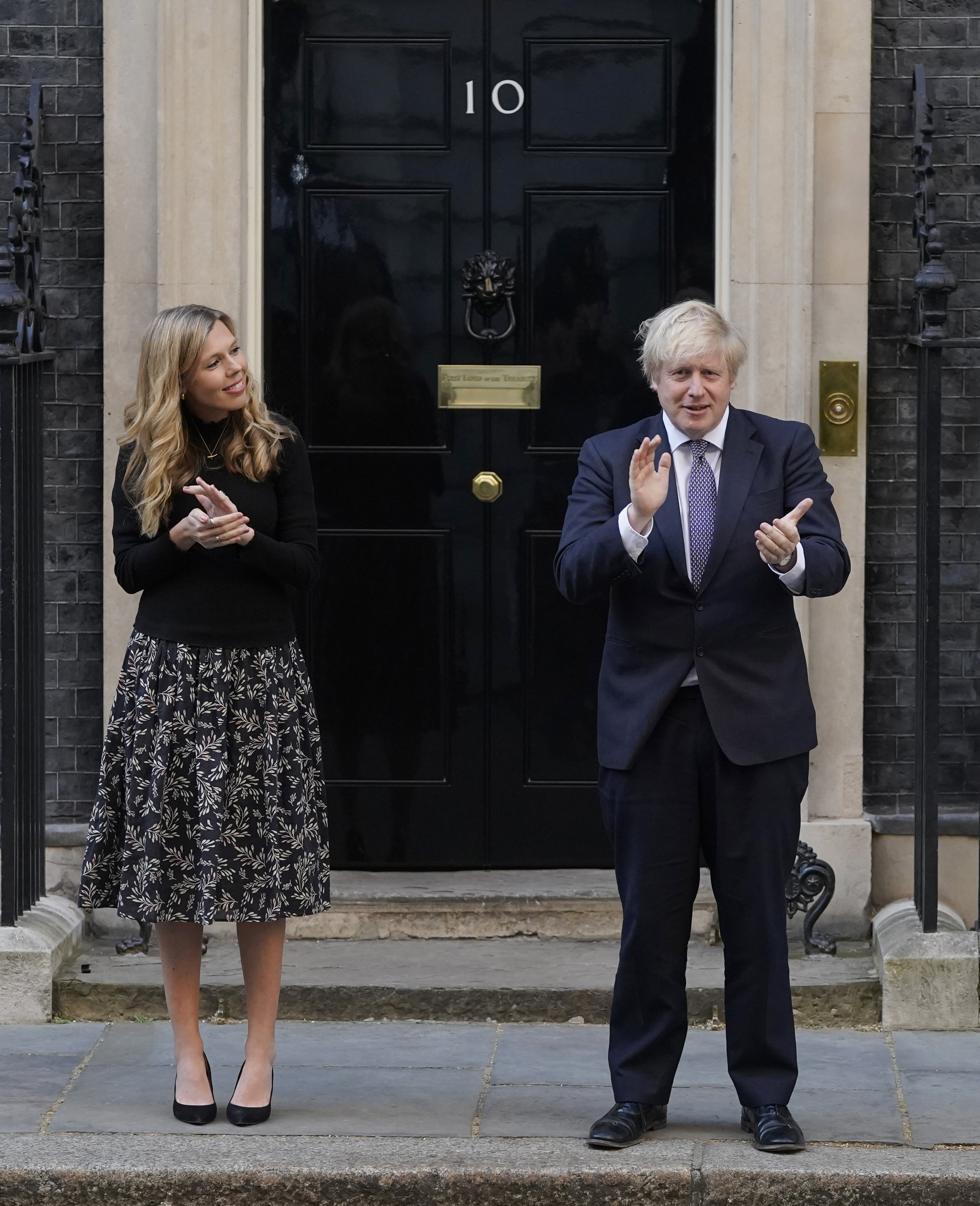
Johnson with his partner Carrie Symonds taking part in 'Clap for Our Carers' on the steps of 10 Downing Street, May 2020

Amid fears of a second peak, on 9 September it was announced that from 14 September, in new rules, gatherings of more than six people in England would become illegal, with a number of set out exceptions. Fines beginning at £100, reaching £3,200 as a maximum for repeated offences, would be issued to those failing to comply. Johnson announced more restrictions on 22 September, which the media termed a "second Covid shutdown". During this time England was also under certain additional local restrictions. These restrictions were replaced with a three-tier approach for England on 14 October.

===== Dominic Cummings scandal =====
In May 2020, reports emerged in the Daily Mirror and The Guardian of Johnson's chief advisor Dominic Cummings travelling from London to County Durham with his family during the first national lockdown in March 2020 whilst Cummings was experiencing symptoms of COVID-19. On 12 April, before Cummings returned to London, he also travelled 30 miles (50 kilometers) to Barnard Castle allegedly to test his eyesight after issues with his vision before returning to London the following day.

On 23 May, a statement from Downing Street said that Cummings' journey was essential. On 24 May, during a press conference, Boris Johnson said that he believed Cummings had acted "responsibly, legally and with integrity". On 25 May, Cummings held a press conference in the rose garden of 10 Downing Street to defend his decision. 45 Conservative MPs either called for Cummings to resign or be sacked. Durham Constabulary did investigate Cummings' movements and whether they had breached any COVID regulations. However, the Constabulary did not consider any offence to have been committed.

The scandal was followed by a decrease in confidence of the public for the Conservative government. A study by the UCL's Covid-19 Social Study found a significant decline in faith of the UK government response to COVID following Cummings's actions and Johnson's refusal to remove him. Cummings, and his ally Lee Cain, would later depart Downing Street in November 2020.

===== Eat Out to Help Out =====
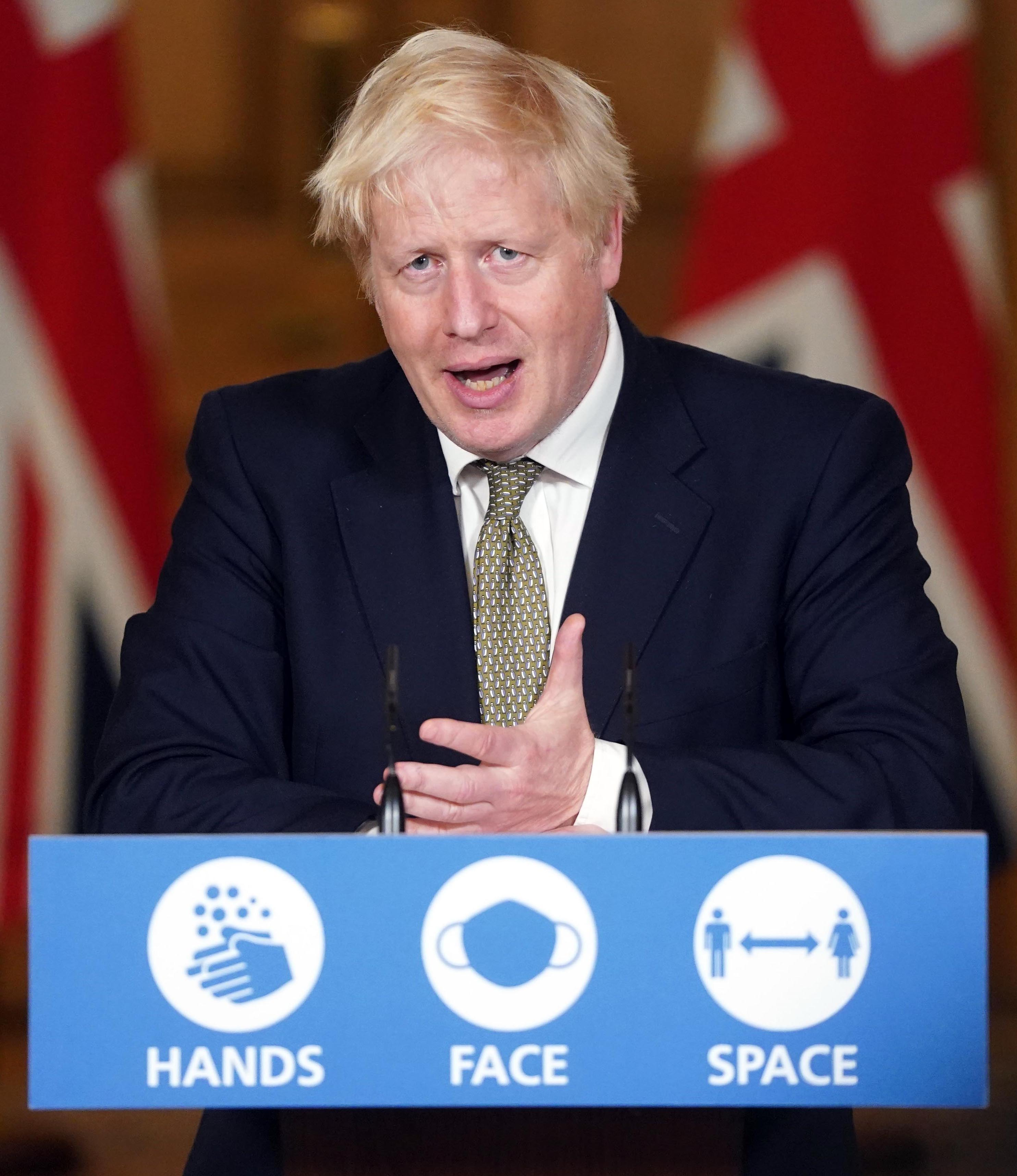
Johnson giving a COVID-19 press conference, October 2021

Eat Out to Help Out was a British government scheme to support and create jobs in the hospitality industry to counter the economic impacts of the COVID-19 pandemic. The scheme involved the government subsidising food and non-alcoholic drinks at participating cafes, pubs, and restaurants at 50%, up to £10 per person (per order). The offer, announced in July 2020, was available during the month of August 2020, from Monday to Wednesday each week.

In total, the scheme subsidised £849 million across 160 million subsidised meals. Some consider the scheme to be a success in boosting the hospitality industry, while others disagree. A 2021 study found that the scheme contributed to a rise in COVID-19 infections. On The Andrew Marr Show on 4 October 2020, Johnson acknowledged the possibility that "Eat Out to Help Out" could have helped spread COVID-19, saying:

I also think that it is important now, irrespective of whether Eat Out To Help Out you know, what the balance of there was, it unquestionably helped to protect many… there are two million jobs at least in the hospitality sector. It was very important to keep those jobs going. Now, if it, insofar as that scheme may have helped to spread the virus, then obviously we need to counteract that and we need to counteract that with the discipline and the measures that we're proposing. I hope you understand the balance we're trying to strike.

===== Second lockdown =====
In a press conference on 31 October, Johnson said that England would enter a four-week national lockdown beginning on 5 November. Non-essential shops and hospitality closed, but schools, colleges and universities remained open. By 16 November, despite not experiencing COVID-19 symptoms, Johnson was self-isolating after coming into contact with an MP who tested positive, leading him on 18 November to become the first prime minister to attend Prime Minister's Questions via video link. The lockdown ended from 2 December when a revised three-tier approach for England was put into force.

===== Vaccination procurement and approval =====
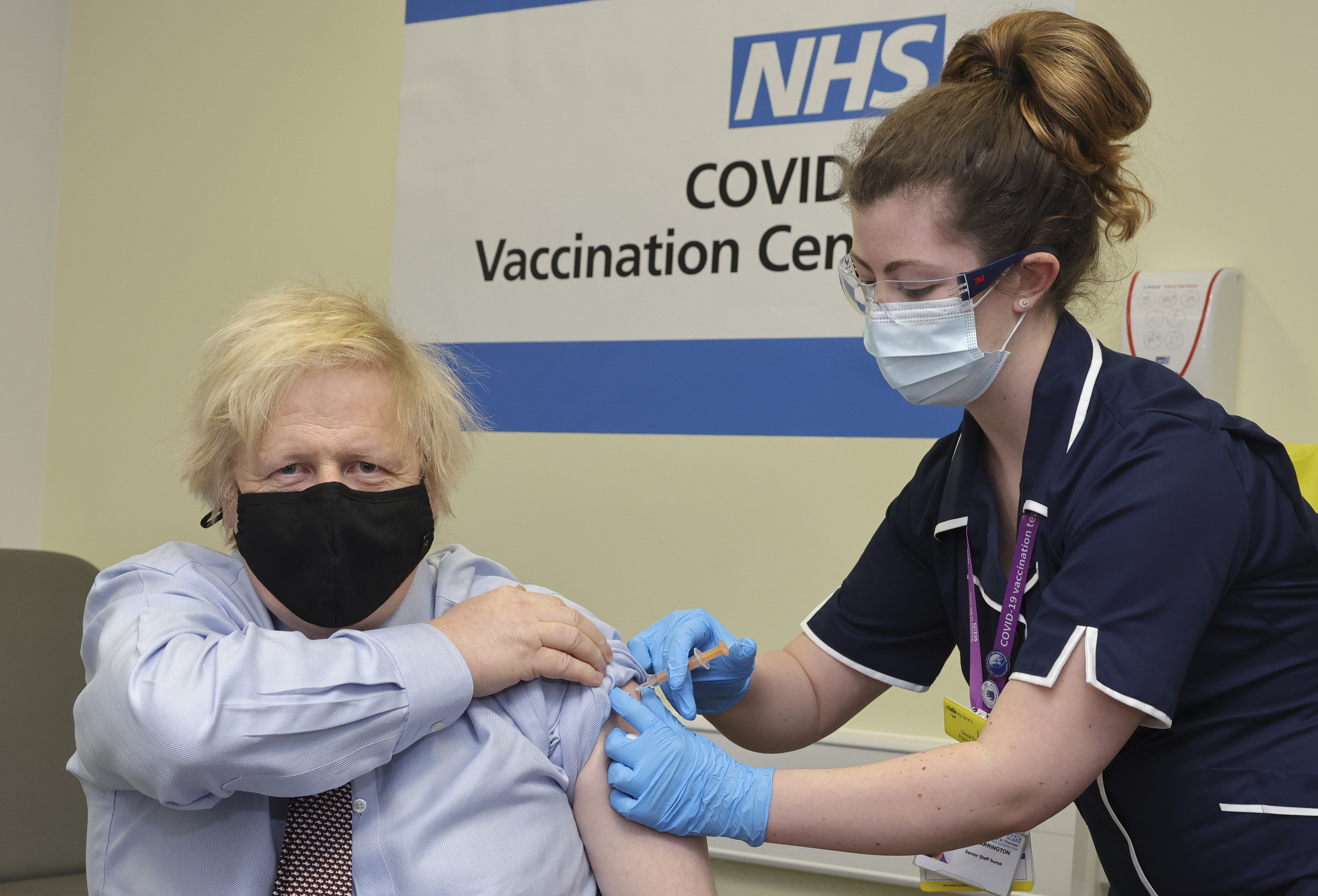
Johnson receiving the COVID-19 vaccine

On 2 December, it was announced that the COVID-19 vaccine developed by Pfizer and BioNTech had been approved by the Medicines and Healthcare products Regulatory Agency. Johnson announced that the UK would receive 800,000 doses of the vaccine the following week for the launch of the UK's vaccination programme. On 30 December, it was announced that the Oxford–AstraZeneca COVID-19 vaccine had been approved and would also be rolled out.

==== Domestic affairs ====
===== Cabinet reshuffle =====
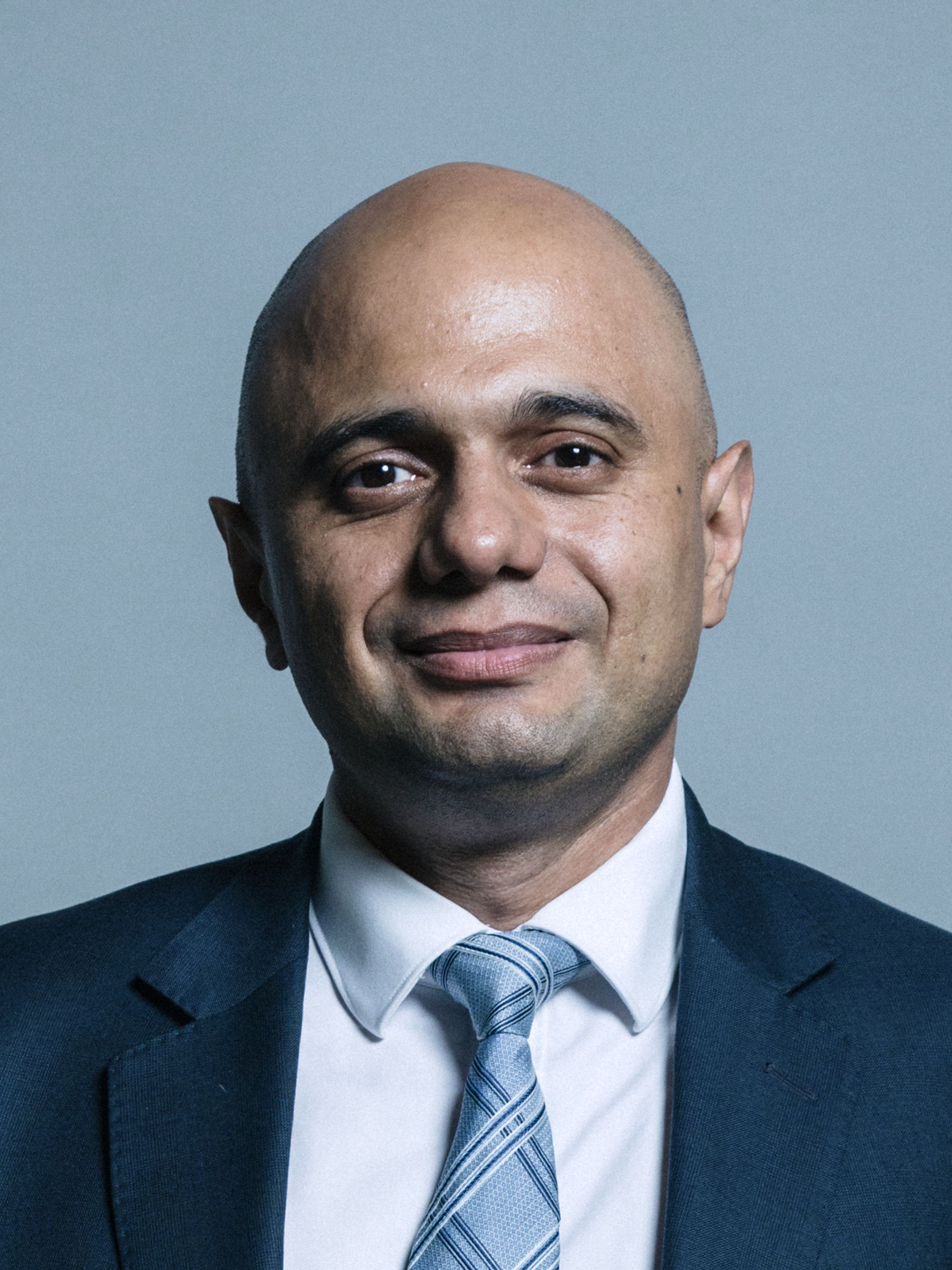
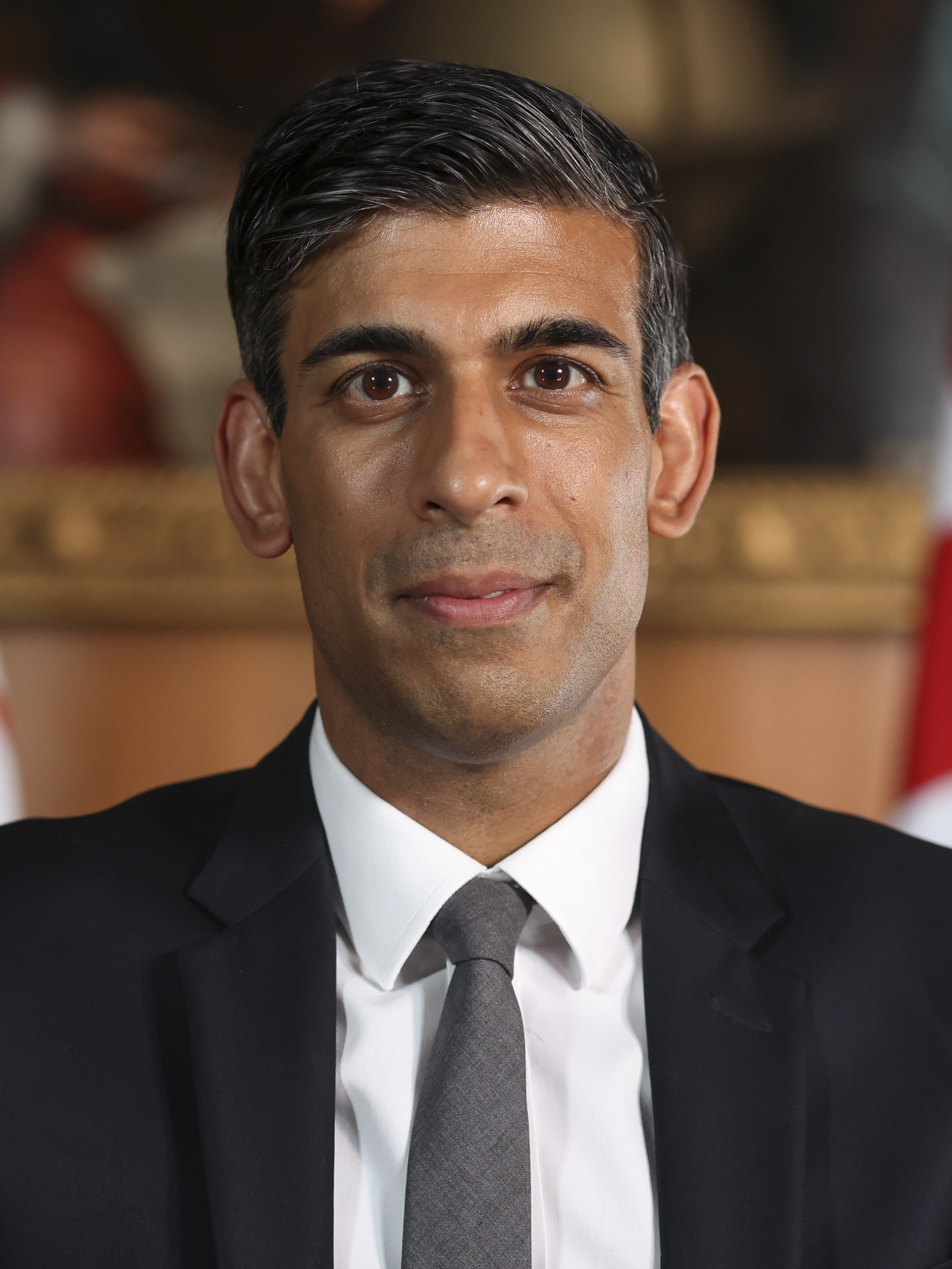
Sajid Javid (left) resigned as Chancellor and was replaced by Rishi Sunak (right)

Johnson conducted a cabinet reshuffle on 13 February when a number of senior ministers were sacked, including Northern Ireland Secretary Julian Smith, Business Secretary Andrea Leadsom, Environment Secretary Theresa Villiers and Attorney General Geoffrey Cox. Others leaving included Nicky Morgan and James Cleverly. In a surprise move, Sajid Javid resigned as Chancellor and was succeeded by Rishi Sunak. Javid's departure came from a refusal to comply with an order by Johnson to sack his advisory team and replace them with aides from Johnson's office. Steve Barclay, Alok Sharma, Brandon Lewis and Oliver Dowden changed their portfolios whilst Anne-Marie Trevelyan, Suella Braverman, George Eustice and Amanda Milling newly joined the cabinet.

===== Transport =====
On 27 February, a court ruling deemed a third runway at Heathrow Airport "unlawful". Johnson said he was not planning to appeal against the ruling. However, the court said that a third runway could be built in the future if it worked in line with the UK's commitments in the Paris Agreement. The Supreme Court lifted the ban on building a third runway a number of months later.

Johnson came under pressure to "pay back the trust of Northern voters" after his victory in the 2019 general election. This was a factor in him giving the go-ahead to the High Speed 2 (HS2) project on 11 February 2020. The rail line, capable of speeds above 186 mph, is scheduled to open in phases between 2028 and 2040. It has been criticised for its projected costs and impact on the environment. Additionally, Downing Street said that work was underway "by a range of government officials" to look into the prospects of building a bridge from Scotland to Northern Ireland.

===== Black Lives Matter =====
Johnson stated that he was "appalled and sickened" by the murder of George Floyd, which led to protests being held across the UK. He urged people to protest peacefully and said that the protesters who "attack[ed] public property or the police" would "face the full force of the law".

==== Foreign affairs ====
On 3 January 2020, a US airstrike in Iraq killed the Iranian general Qasem Soleimani. Johnson was not told about the attack by US president Donald Trump prior to it happening. He was criticised for not returning from his holiday in Mustique as tensions between Iran and the West rose.

On 16 June 2020, Johnson announced that the Department for International Development would merge with the Foreign and Commonwealth Office, to create a new department named the Foreign, Commonwealth and Development Office. The move was carried out on 2 September, but was criticised by the Labour Party and by former prime ministers David Cameron, Gordon Brown and Tony Blair.

During Johnson's premiership the UK has seen an increase in English Channel migrant crossings. In August 2020, it was reported that in 2020 so far almost 4,000 people had crossed the Channel illegally, using at least 300 small boats. On 6 August a record number of migrants arrived, at least 235. It was also observed that while it was originally mostly men arriving, young children and pregnant women were also arriving. By the end of 2020, about 635 boats had crossed the English Channel, carrying 8,438 people.

===== China =====
On 28 January, the UK government decided to let Huawei have a limited role in building its new 5G network and supplying new high-speed network equipment to wireless carriers, whilst ignoring the US government's warnings that it would sever intelligence sharing if they did not exclude the company. The UK government stated that they deemed Huawei as a high-risk vendor but decided against banning the company from its 5G network, and said instead that they had decided to "use Huawei in a limited way so we can collectively manage the risk". Several Conservative Party members, on their part, warned against using Huawei. Due in part to pressure from the US government, in July 2020 Johnson's government decided not to buy any of Huawei's equipment, and told mobile providers to remove the firm's 5G technology from their networks by 2027. In November 2020, the government announced that the installation of 5G equipment will no longer be permitted from September 2021.

During the Hong Kong–Mainland China conflict in July 2020, Johnson's government offered up to three million Hong Kong citizens the opportunity to live in the UK with a "route to citizenship" if they held British National (Overseas) passports.

===== Brexit =====
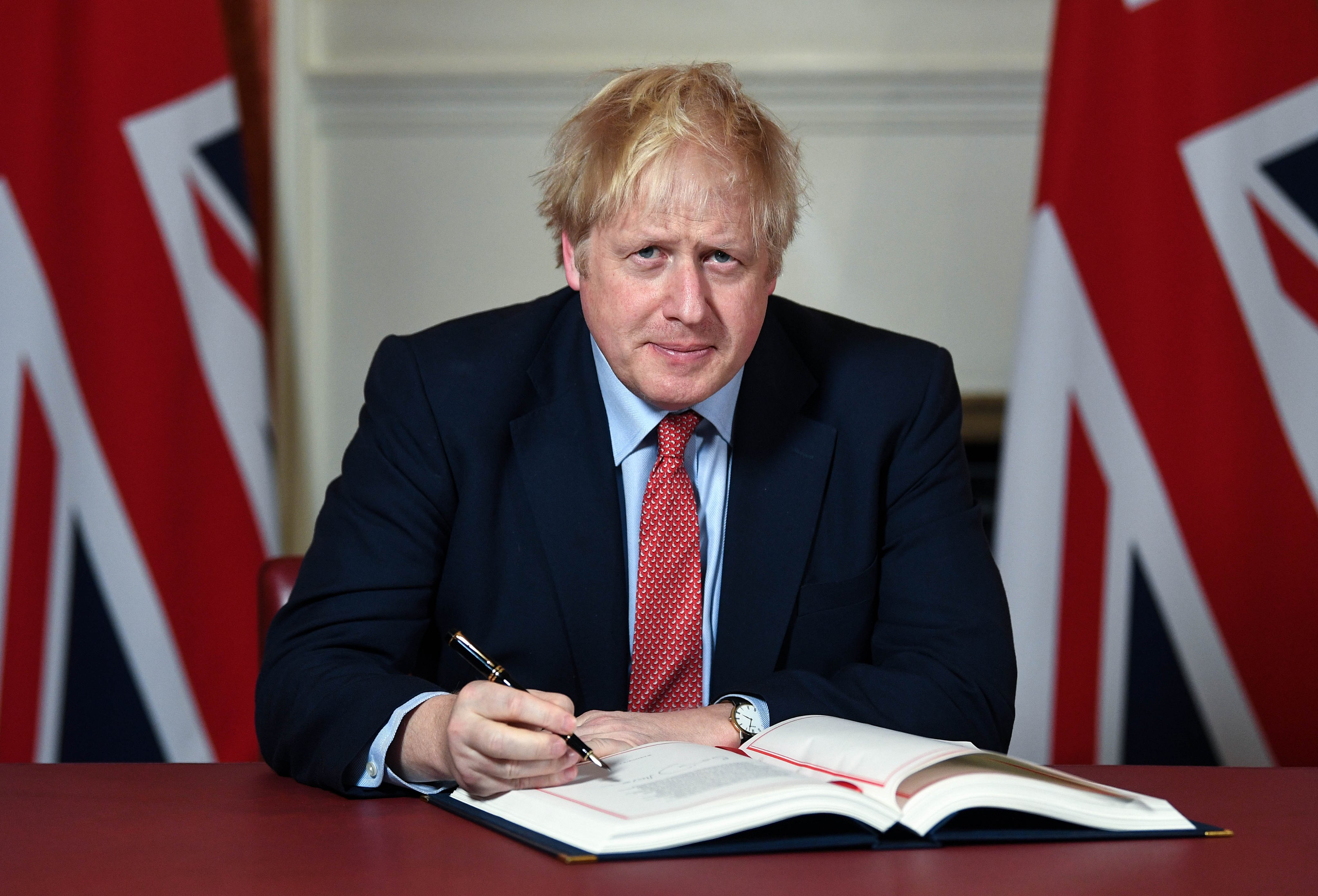
Johnson signing the Withdrawal Agreement, 24 January 2020

Johnson welcomed a decision by political parties in Northern Ireland to restore the Northern Ireland Assembly on the basis of negotiations between the British and Irish governments. Talks succeeded under Northern Ireland Secretary Julian Smith to create a 6th Northern Ireland Assembly, which resumed meeting on 11 January 2020. It followed a three-year hiatus with a new power sharing agreement between Sinn Féin and the DUP.

On 18 January 2020, Johnson revealed plans for the Brexit Day celebrations in Downing Street, and the commemorative coin which entered circulation on that day.

On 20 January, in its first defeat since the general election, Johnson's government lost three votes in the House of Lords over its Brexit legislation. However, two days later, he said the UK had "crossed the Brexit finish line" after parliament passed the EU bill for implementing the withdrawal agreement. On 23 January, the bill was given royal assent and the next day it was signed by European leaders in Brussels and by Johnson in Downing Street. The signing in Downing Street was witnessed by both British and European officials, including the prime minister's Europe advisor David Frost.

There was a vote on the UK government EU bill in the European Parliament on 29 January where it was ratified by 621 votes to 49.

The Department for Exiting the European Union was closed down at 11:01 pm on 31 January, a minute after the United Kingdom officially left the European Union. The Brexit transition period lasted until 31 December 2020, an end date that was included in Theresa May's withdrawal agreement. Under an article of the agreement, the UK-EU Joint Committee could have decided to extend the transition period by "up to two years", but Johnson expressed his wish to have signed a free-trade deal with the EU by the end of December. During this time the UK remained in the EU's Single Market and Customs Union.

The UK and EU trade negotiations were affected by the COVID-19 pandemic in that videoconferencing was employed by the two sides.

In July 2020 the newly reconstituted Intelligence and Security Committee report on Russia was released. It stated that the British government and intelligence agencies had failed to conduct any proper assessment of attempts by the Russian government to interfere with the 2016 EU membership referendum. It stated that the government "had not seen or sought evidence of successful interference in UK democratic processes". The committee's Stewart Hosie, an SNP MP, said "The report reveals that no one in government knew if Russia interfered in or sought to influence the referendum because they did not want to know". Yet, the report stated that committee members had said that no firm conclusion could be ascertained on whether the Russian government had or had not successfully interfered in the referendum.

On 4 September 2020 former Australian prime minister Tony Abbott was appointed by the government as an advisor to the Board of Trade. Opposition MPs called for him to have been rejected over his views on "homosexuality, women and climate change". Seven months after the UK left the EU, the country's first major post-Brexit trade agreement was signed, a deal with Japan, with Liz Truss on the British negotiating side. It was said that "99% of exports to Japan" would be "tariff-free" as a result of the deal.

The introduction of the UK Internal Market Bill to Parliament caused controversy as there were concerns about the impact of parts of the bill on the rule of law. The government ultimately withdrew these parts before enactment.

On 16 October 2020 Johnson said that the UK "must get ready" for no trade deal with the EU.

Following last-minute negotiations, it was announced on 24 December that a UK-EU trade deal had been agreed.

=== 2021 ===
==== COVID-19 ====
===== Third lockdown in England =====
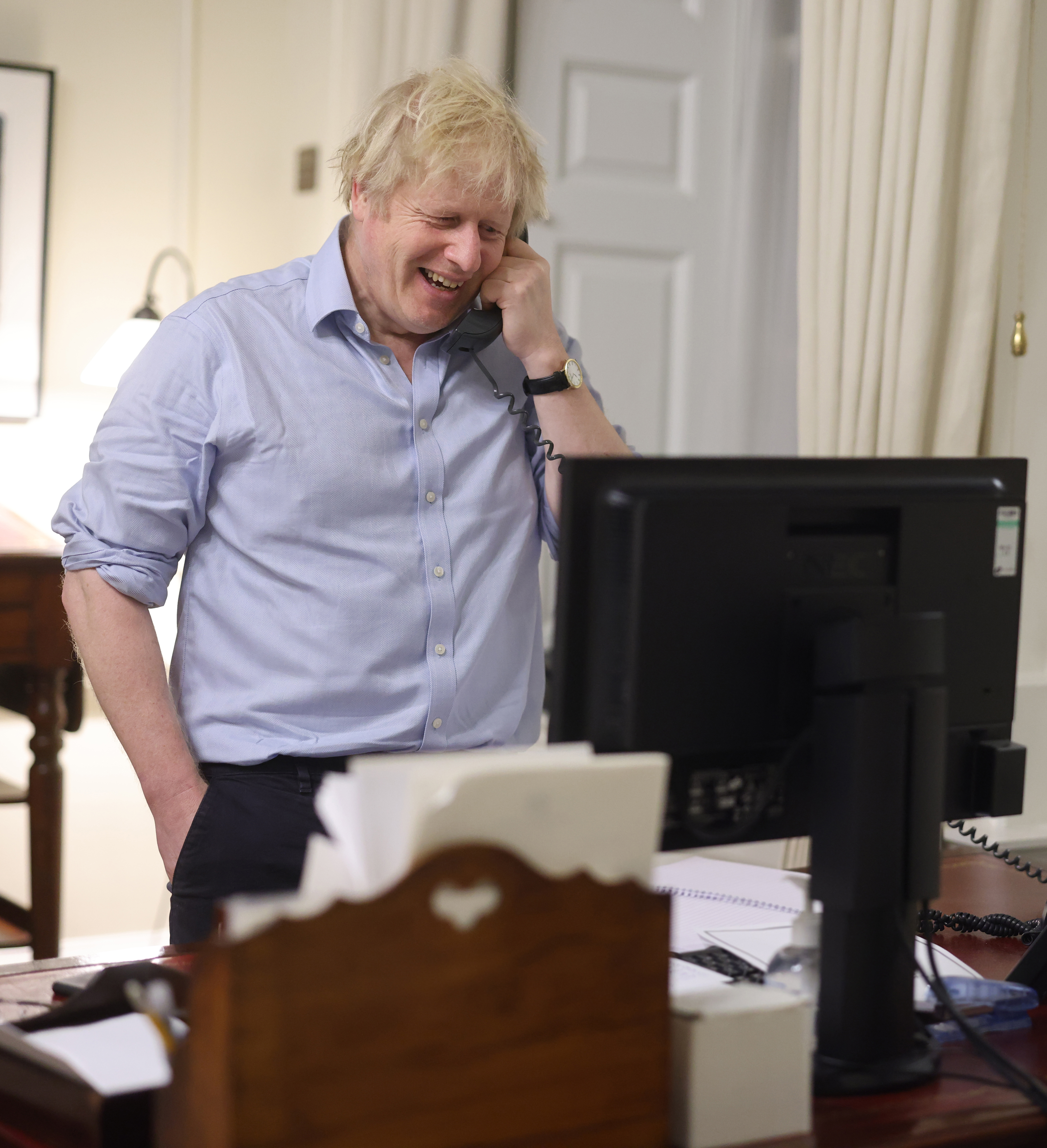
Johnson speaking to US President Joe Biden on the day of his inauguration, January 2021

On 4 January, Johnson announced that England would enter a third lockdown beginning the following day. Scotland also decided to enforce this lockdown. People were told only to leave their homes for limited reasons. All schools and colleges closed to the majority of pupils. At the time the restrictions were said to last until at least mid-February. Also on 4 January, an 82-year-old man named Brian Pinker became the first person to receive the Oxford–AstraZeneca COVID-19 vaccine. On 5 January, Rishi Sunak announced economic support for businesses during this lockdown with up to £9,000 in grants per property. Some business groups believed the help was a good start but didn't go far enough to prevent the collapse of some businesses. Health Secretary Matt Hancock confirmed the vaccination target of every adult in the UK to receive a dose of the vaccination by Autumn 2021 and all vulnerable groups to receive one by mid-February.

In January, the head of the COVID Recovery Group, Steve Baker MP, warned Boris Johnson that he may face a leadership challenge if COVID restrictions weren't lifted citing concerns surrounding civil liberties. Boris Johnson confirmed that all travel corridors into the UK would be closed starting on 18 January due to worries of potential new strains whilst confirming that all visitors would have to demonstrate proof of a negative COVID test before arriving.

In the March 2021 budget, Chancellor of the Exchequer Rishi Sunak announced that the furlough scheme would be extended until September 2021. By this period, the scheme had supported over 11 million jobs since its introduction in March 2020. Sunak also announced an extension of the Universal Credit £20 uplift, to be continued for an additional six months amongst other measures.

===== Start of reopening =====
On 22 February, Boris Johnson announced a four step plan for ending all COVID restrictions by 21 June. On 25 February, the COVID alert level was lowered from level 5 to 4. By 28 February, the milestone of 20 million first vaccinations being administered had been achieved. On 8 March, schools in England reopened, with secondary schools requiring masks in lessons. Johnson received his first dose of the AstraZeneca vaccine on 19 March and encouraged others to do the same, saying: "Everybody, when you do get your notification to go for a jab, please go and get it." On 29 March, outdoor met-ups and outdoor sports facilities would be re-opened.

On 7 April the Moderna COVID-19 vaccine began being rolled out. On 12 April, pub gardens and shops were reopened. By 12 April, all high risk individuals and over-50s had been offered at least the first COVID vaccine. By 24 April, over half the population had received at least one vaccine. On 5 May, the Government announced a £29.3 million increase in funding to help with vaccine development against future potential variants. On 10 May, the COVID alert level was lowered from 4 to 3 on the same day that zero COVID deaths were reported in England, Scotland and Northern Ireland. On 12 May, Johnson said an independent public inquiry into the handling of the pandemic would be held in spring 2022.

During a select committee hearing, Dominic Cummings claimed that thousands of people died due to COVID mistakes and that Boris Johnson was "unfit for the job". Equally, he accused Johnson of ignoring scientific advice and wrongly delaying lockdowns. Furthermore, Cummings accused Health Secretary Matt Hancock of "criminal, disgraceful behaviour that caused serious harm" and that he should have been fired for 15 to 20 different things. On 19 July, a date dubbed "Freedom Day" by the media, the majority of COVID-19 restrictions were lifted in England.

===== "Let the bodies pile high in their thousands" =====
In April 2021, Johnson denied allegations made by the Daily Mail that he had said he would rather have seen "bodies pile high in their thousands" than approve a third lockdown. The full remark was reported to have been "No more fucking lockdowns – let the bodies pile high in their thousands". He is alleged to have said it on 30 October 2020, one day before the announcement of the second national lockdown.

Sources told the BBC and Robert Peston of ITV News that the remark was made. According to Peston, the remarks were heard by a number of people. Both The Guardian and the BBC reported that the remark had been heard shouted from an office in Downing Street following a main meeting. Peston stated that two witnesses were prepared to swear under oath that the remarks were made. Former chief adviser Dominic Cummings said in a May select committee that he heard the remarks being made.

Johnson denied having made the remark, describing it as "total, total rubbish". Cabinet ministers Michael Gove and Ben Wallace also stated that the reports of the remarks were untrue. The reported remark was condemned by other British politicians and relatives of victims of the COVID-19 pandemic.

In a statement to the UK COVID-19 Inquiry, Eddie Lister, the Downing Street Chief of Staff at the time, confirmed that Johnson made the statement and called it "an unfortunate turn of phrase".

===== Omicron variant =====
In December 2021, more stringent restrictions for England were put forward by Johnson and the government. The restrictions, called "Plan B", were a partial renewal of previous measures due to the increased incidence of the SARS-CoV-2 Omicron variant. These proposals included face coverings to be required in more public settings, guidance to use remote work wherever possible, and requirements of COVID passports to enter a nightclub or other large venues. However, 40 Conservative MPs later voted against mandatory face coverings in the House of Commons and 100 voted against compulsory COVID passes – the largest parliamentary rebellion of Johnson's premiership. Eight Labour MPs, ten Liberal Democrat MPs and six Democratic Unionist MPs also voted against the proposals, as well as Green Party MP Caroline Lucas and independent MPs Rob Roberts and Jeremy Corbyn.

==== Domestic affairs ====
===== Downing Street refurbishment controversy =====
In April 2021, Cummings made allegations that Johnson had arranged for donors to "secretly pay" for renovations on the private residence at 11 Downing Street. Cummings wrote on his blog that the plans were "unethical, foolish, possibly illegal" and "almost certainly broke the rules on proper disclosure of political donations if conducted in the way he intended."

On 27 April Johnson asked the Cabinet Secretary, Simon Case, to hold a review about the refurbishment. On 28 April, the Electoral Commission announced it had opened a formal investigation into the allegations. On the same day Johnson insisted that he had not broken any laws over the refurbishment and had met the requirements he was obliged to meet in full. During Prime Minister's Questions, the leader of the opposition, Keir Starmer, asked: "Who initially paid for the redecoration of his Downing Street flat?"; Johnson responded: "I paid for Downing Street's refurbishment personally, Mr. Speaker."

On 28 May Lord Geidt published a report on the allegations in an annex to the register of interests. The report concluded that Johnson did not breach the Ministerial Code and that no conflict, or reasonably perceived conflict, of interest arose. However, Lord Geidt expressed that it was "unwise" for Johnson to have proceeded with refurbishments without "more rigorous regard for how this would be funded". Angela Rayner, Deputy Leader of the Labour Party, wrote to Lord Geidt asking for evidence of the lack of conflict of interest and said that it was "frankly scarcely believable" that Johnson did not know who was funding the refurbishments.

The Electoral Commission reported on 9 December that it found that the Conservative Party had failed to follow the law in not accurately reporting donations to the party from Lord Brownlow and imposed a £17,800 fine. The Herald say the commission's report outlines how in March all the money paid by Brownlow and his company had been reimbursed as had payments made by the Conservative Party and Cabinet Office. Downing Street had said at the time that the full cost of the works had been met personally by the prime minister. Following the publication of the report, The Guardian reported that Johnson had been accused of misleading Lord Geidt during his investigation due to apparent inconsistencies between the reports. Johnson had told Geidt that he did not know who had paid for the refurbishments until the story was reported in the media in February 2021, whereas the Electoral Commission found that he had messaged Lord Brownlow asking for extra funds in November 2020. Downing Street denied that there was any inconsistency stating that Johnson only contacted Brownlow in his role as the head of a blind trust collecting donations, but was not aware that Brownlow was also the source of the donations.

===== Local elections and Hartlepool by-election =====
On 6 May 2021, local and mayoral elections were held across the UK, as well as Senedd and Scottish Parliament elections, and a by-election in Hartlepool. Johnson's Conservatives substantially improved their vote shares in most of the country, and won Hartlepool for the first time in the constituency's history. These elections were widely seen as a boost to the future of Johnson and his party, and further secured his position.

===== Cabinet reshuffle =====
Johnson conducted a cabinet reshuffle on 15 September 2021, which saw Dominic Raab become Justice Secretary and Deputy Prime Minister and be replaced as Foreign Secretary by International Trade Secretary Liz Truss. Also changing their portfolios were Michael Gove, Steve Barclay and Oliver Dowden. Nadhim Zahawi, Anne-Marie Trevelyan and Nadine Dorries newly joined the cabinet, while Gavin Williamson, Robert Buckland, Robert Jenrick and Amanda Milling left the cabinet.

===== Energy crisis =====
In September 2021, a fuel supply crisis occurred in the UK, caused by panic buying triggered by media reports of a leaked government briefing discussing the shortage of heavy goods vehicle (HGV) drivers. This coincided with a rise in energy prices that Johnson said was a "short-term" problem caused by "the global economy coming back to life" after the COVID-19 pandemic. Economists of various political views, and the head of energy regulator Ofgem strongly disagreed. The UK government has turned to Qatar to seek a long-term natural gas deal to ensure a stable supply of liquefied natural gas (LNG) to the UK.

===== Owen Paterson affair =====
In November 2021, Johnson backed a motion to block the suspension of Owen Paterson, a Conservative MP found to have abused his position by the independent standards commissioner after undertaking paid lobbying on behalf of two companies. The motion called for the creation of a new Conservative-majority committee to examine reforms of the standards investigation process. Many Conservative MPs refused to support the motion, and 13 defied a three-line whip to vote against it. Following the announcement by opposition parties that they would boycott the new committee, and faced with a backlash in the media and from MPs of all parties, the government reversed its position and announced that a new vote would take place on whether Paterson should be suspended. Paterson announced his resignation as an MP the same day. At a meeting of the 1922 Committee, Johnson said that he made a mistake over his handling of the affair.

===== North Shropshire by-election =====
After Paterson resigned, a by-election was held in Paterson's former constituency of North Shropshire. The Liberal Democrat candidate, Helen Morgan, overturned a Conservative majority of nearly 23,000 to win the seat. The 34% swing was seventh largest in United Kingdom by-election history. Veteran Conservative backbencher Sir Roger Gale described the result "as a referendum on the prime minister's performance".

===== Events =====
Following the death of Prince Philip, Duke of Edinburgh on 9 April 2021, the government ordered that its communications and some aspects of ministerial activity would pause for a number of mourning days. Johnson married Carrie Symonds on 29 May in a secret ceremony at Westminster Cathedral.

==== Domestic policy ====
The 2021 Queen's Speech announced that the government will "level up opportunities across all parts of the United Kingdom, supporting jobs, businesses and economic growth and addressing the impact of the pandemic on public services", implementing an election manifesto pledge. Laws proposed in the Queen's Speech included a Higher Education (Freedom of Speech) Bill to combat deplatforming at universities, an Online Safety Bill to impose a statutory duty of care on online companies and empower Ofcom to block particular websites, and an Animal Welfare (Sentience) Bill to legally recognise animal sentience.

===== Social care =====
On 7 September Johnson announced plans for social care reforms, including a 1.25% rise in National Insurance to raise £36 billion over three years, and a cap of £86,000 on lifetime care costs in England. The following day MPs voted in favour of an NHS and social care tax rise by 319 votes to 248, a majority of 71.

===== Levelling up =====
The Ministry for Housing, Communities and Local Government was renamed the Department for Levelling Up, Housing and Communities under Gove, its secretary of state. Former Bank of England chief economist Andy Haldane was appointed as the head of the Levelling Up Taskforce.

==== Foreign affairs ====
===== Brexit =====
The EU–UK Trade and Cooperation Agreement, the UK-EU trade deal provisionally came into force on 1 January 2021. In October 2021, the Office for Budget Responsibility (OBR) estimated that Brexit would reduce the UK's potential GDP by 4% over the long term, a bigger economic impact than the pandemic which would result in approximately £40 billion worth in lost revenue for the Treasury per year. Furthermore, the OBR estimated an import and export intensity reduction of 15% due to Brexit.

===== G7 summit =====
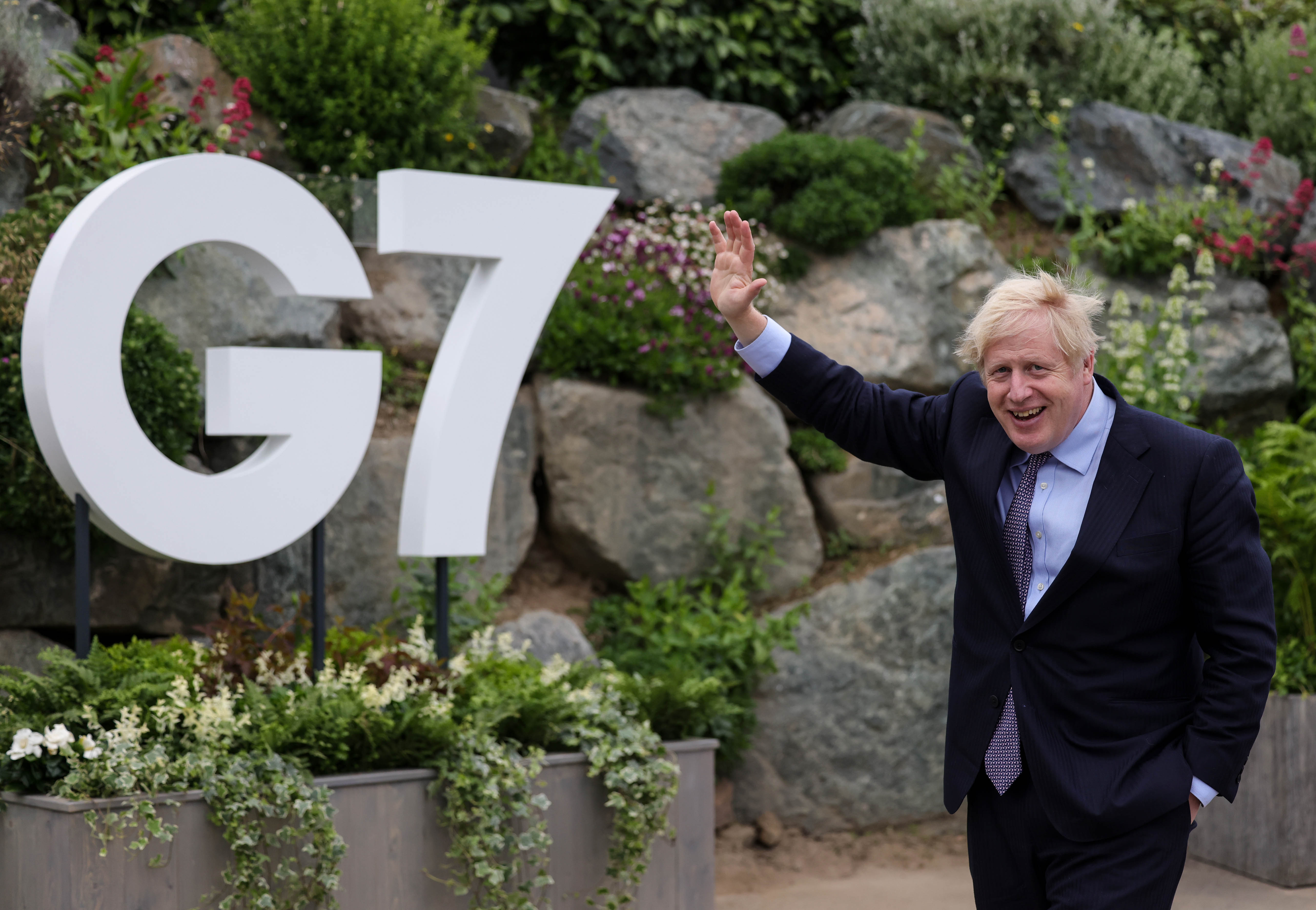
Johnson at the 47th G7 summit, which he chaired in June 2021

Johnson chaired the 47th G7 summit, which was held from 11 to 13 June 2021 in Cornwall, England. He invited leaders from India, South Korea, South Africa and Australia. Australia welcomed the official invitation. Moon Jae-in, President of South Korea, accepted the invitation and extended an invitation to Johnson to attend the Partnering for Green Growth and the Global Goals 2030 (P4G Summit) in May 2021, which Johnson accepted. Narendra Modi, Prime Minister of India, also accepted the invitation. It was suggested that Johnson is attempting to expand the G7 group, a meeting forum for the world's leading economies, to create the D-10, a forum for the world's ten leading democracies.

The 2021 summit was the first summit attended by Italian Prime Minister Mario Draghi and US President Joe Biden, and was the last summit attended by German Chancellor Angela Merkel. It was also the first and only summit for Japanese Prime Minister Yoshihide Suga.

===== Chagos dispute =====
The United Kingdom and Mauritius dispute the sovereignty of the Chagos Archipelago in the Indian Ocean. In February 2019, the International Court of Justice in The Hague issued an advisory opinion stating that the UK has an obligation to bring to an end its administration of the Chagos archipelago as rapidly as possible. In June 2020, 30 British MPs – including Labour, SNP and Liberal Democrats – signed a letter calling on Prime Minister Johnson to act immediately on the ICJ ruling. However, the Foreign Office rejected the advisory opinion. Johnson disputed Mauritian claims to sovereignty over the Chagos.

===== Migrant crossings =====
On 19 July, 430 people crossed the English Channel, making it the largest crossing on record. 1,850 people crossed in July alone, which was more than the total for the whole of 2019.

===== Withdrawal from Afghanistan =====
On 17 August, following the UK's removal of troops from Afghanistan and the fall of Kabul to the Taliban, Johnson announced a new scheme to resettle 20,000 Afghans in Britain. Parliament was recalled on 18 August and MPs gathered in the House of Commons chamber, with those previously haven spoken via video link unable to do so.

===== AUKUS =====
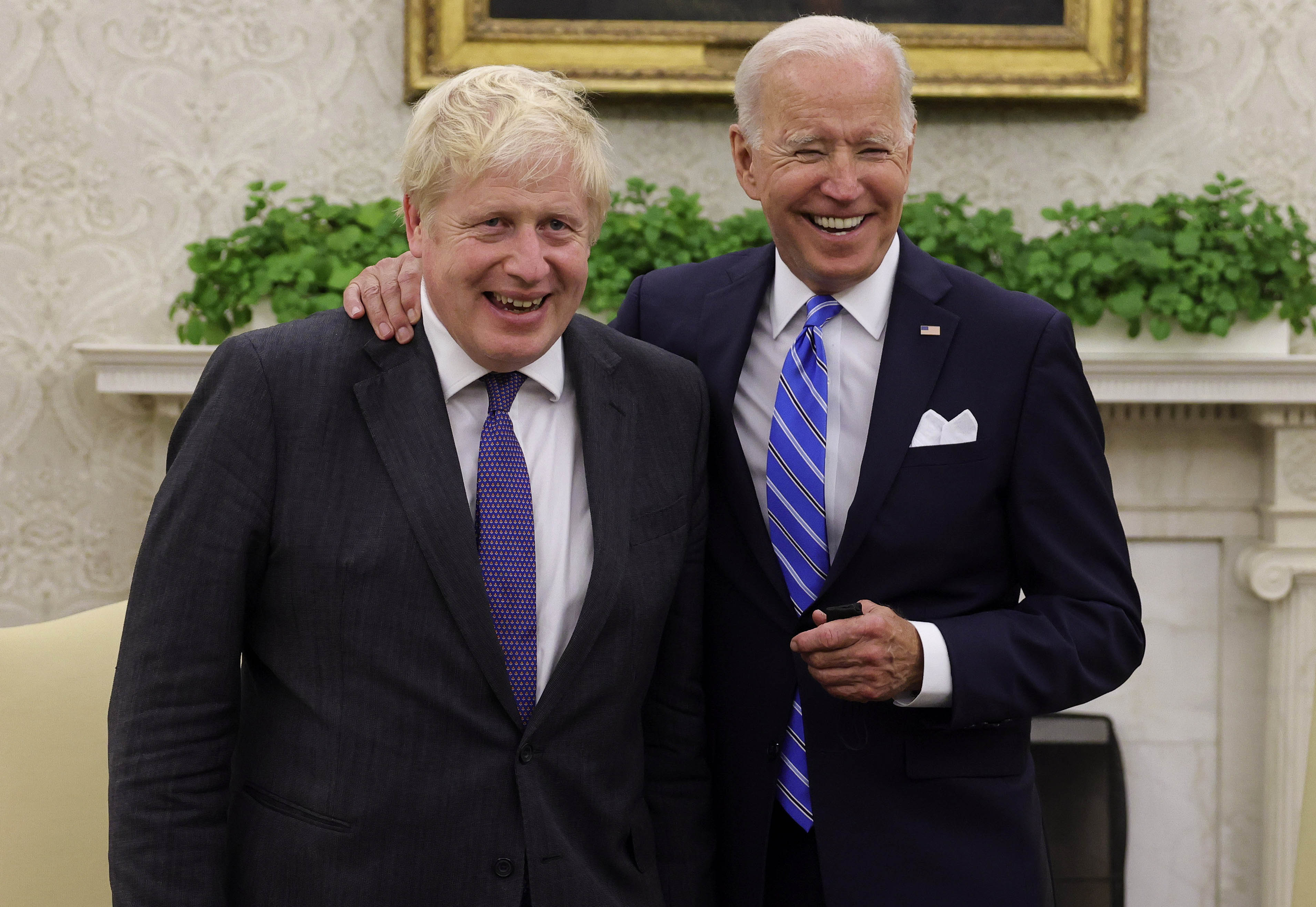
Johnson with U.S. President Joe Biden in the Oval Office

On 15 September, Johnson, Australian prime minister Scott Morrison and US president Joe Biden announced AUKUS, a security pact between the United Kingdom, Australia and the United States seen as an initiative to counter the perceived dominance of China in the Pacific. According to the pact, the US and UK would help Australia to acquire nuclear powered submarines. The agreement also includes cooperation on advanced cyber, artificial intelligence and autonomy, quantum technologies, undersea capabilities, hypersonic and counter-hypersonic, electronic warfare, innovation and information sharing.

French and Chinese officials criticised the agreement. Prime Minister Boris Johnson said that the deal would create "hundreds of high-skilled jobs" and "preserve security and stability around the world" but said that the relationship with France was "rock solid". Johnson responded to French anger on 21 September by saying "I just think it's time for some of our dearest friends around the world to prenez un grip about this and donnez-moi un break"; the latter being broken French for "get a grip and give me a break". He made further reference to the deal in his speech at the Conservative Party Conference the following month, touting it as "a supreme example of global Britain in action, of something daring and brilliant that would simply would not have happened if we'd remained in the EU", whilst acknowledging "a certain raucous squawkus from the anti-AUKUS caucus."

===== COP26 =====
The 26th United Nations Climate Change conference was hosted in the United Kingdom in Glasgow between 31 October and 13 November 2021, with the Cabinet Secretary Alok Sharma as the president of the conference. On 13 November 2021, the Glasgow Climate Pact was signed which pledged to 'phase down' the use of coal. It also agreed to pledge further cuts in CO_{2} emissions in 2022 to keep temperature rises within 1.5 °C. Furthermore, it was agreed to increase climate financing for developing countries.

=== 2022 ===
==== Domestic affairs ====
===== Cost of living crisis =====
The UK cost of living crisis is a period starting in late 2021 which intensified in mid-2022 in which prices for many essential goods in the United Kingdom began increasing faster than household income, resulting in a fall in real income. This is caused in part by a rise in inflation in the UK. While all in the UK are affected by rising prices, it most substantially affects low-income persons.

Both global and local factors have contributed to the UK's cost of living crisis. According to Bank of England governor Andrew Bailey, about 80% of the causes driving the cost of living crisis are global. These include the ongoing COVID-19 pandemic, an ongoing chip shortage, an energy crisis in 2021–2022, a supply chain crisis in 2021–2022 and the Russian invasion of Ukraine. The UK was reported to be among the worst affected among the world's advanced economies.

Causes unique to the UK include labour shortages related to foreign workers leaving due to Brexit, and additional taxes on households. Factors that have worsened the crisis since 1 April 2022 include Ofgem increasing the household energy price cap by 54%, an increase in National Insurance, and a rise in Council Tax. Household income, whether from wages or benefits, has not generally kept pace with rising prices. In April 2022, UK real wages fell by 4.5%, the sharpest fall since records began back in 2001.

By September 2022, the UK was the only G7 economy that had not reached pre-COVID-19 pandemic levels of GDP. In August 2022, a report by academics at the University of Oxford over the previous year found that Brexit had exacerbated labour shortages in the UK, most notably in the hospitality and support sectors. Alongside Brexit, the academics cited an increase in the early retirement of workers older than 50 as a factor in the shortages.

Based on an Office for National Statistics (ONS) survey between May and June 2022, it found that 52% of respondents had cut back on their energy use. According to a survey from the Food Foundation think tank published in February 2022, one million UK adults went a whole day without eating over the past month. In March 2022, at the start of the crisis, it was estimated that 6.7 million people were already using food banks in the UK. A further 9.9m across England, Wales and Northern Ireland – more than one in five people who responded to a survey – said they'd skipped a meal or cut down on portion sizes. The chief executive of the Trussell Trust (an NGO and charity that works to end the need for food banks), Emma Revie, says the expansion is partly down to the fall in benefits, once inflation is taken into account.

In response to the crisis, the Government announced several measures to help solve the crisis. A £400 energy grant was announced for all households. There was then a more targeted payment response for the more vulnerable in society in the form of a £650 payment to the 8 million lowest income households in the country, £300 for 8 million pensioner households and £150 for 6 million in non-means tested disability benefits. To help fund these energy support payments, Chancellor Rishi Sunak announced a windfall tax, to tax extraordinary profits of energy companies which aimed to raise about £5bn of revenue.

===== Inflation rise =====
Inflation started to rise at the end of 2021, affecting the cost of food, transport, electricity and other daily items. By June 2022, inflation in the UK reached 9.4%, the highest inflation rate since 1982. In August 2022, the Bank of England estimated that inflation could reach 13% by the end of 2022. In response, the Bank's Monetary Policy Committee voted 8–1 in favour of raising interest rates by 0.5 percentage points to 1.75 per cent on 4 August 2022, the biggest increase in 27 years. In June 2022, the OECD reported that the UK would be set to have the worst rate of economic growth in the G20 apart from Russia. The OECD attributed this to high inflation and tax increases.

There is no complete consensus amongst economists on the cause of the inflationary surge, however, most attribute it to product shortages resulting from global supply-chain problems, largely caused by the COVID-19 pandemic. Another factor regarding the rise in inflation was the 2022 Russian invasion of Ukraine. Before the invasion, Ukraine accounted for 11.5% of the world's wheat crop market, and contributed 17% of the world's maize crop export market, and the invasion caused wheat and maize from Ukraine unable to reach international market, causing shortage, and result in dramatic rise in prices, that exacerbated to foodstuffs and biodiesel prices.

===== Tax rises =====
The UK tax take is set to rise from 33.5% of GDP before the pandemic to 36.2% by the mid-2020s. That will be the highest share of national income taken by the state since the early 1950s. Corporation tax is also rising from 19% to 25%, income tax thresholds are being frozen in cash terms – dragging more workers into higher bands. On 7 September 2021, the Government had announced an increase of National Insurance (NI) rates by 1.25 percentage points (from 12% to 13.25%) for the 2022–23 tax year, breaking its 2019 manifesto promise. From 2023, a new health and social care levy charged at the same 1.25% rate would be introduced with NI rates reverting to their previous levels.

===== Conversion therapy =====
In early April 2022, Johnson announced his intention to ban conversion therapy for sexual orientation but not for transgender Britons, despite a previous commitment to end such treatment for all LGBT people. He defended his decision citing "complexities and sensitivities", adding that he thought trans women should not compete in women's sport or enter women's changing rooms.

==== June 2022 by-elections and local elections ====
Following heavy Conservative defeats in the 23 June by-elections in Wakefield and Tiverton and Honiton, by the Labour Party and the Liberal Democrats respectively, Oliver Dowden, the Chairman of the Conservative Party, resigned, saying: "We cannot carry on with business as usual" and "Somebody must take responsibility". Former party leader Michael Howard called for Johnson to resign, saying: "[Mr Johnson's] biggest asset has always been his ability to win votes but I'm afraid yesterday's results make it clear that he no longer has that ability. ... The best person in the Conservative Party to judge the mood, both of the party and of the electorate, is its chairman... I think the party, and even more importantly the country, would now be better off under new leadership." Johnson announced that had no intention of changing or resigning; senior Conservatives accused him of increasingly "delusional" behaviour. On 26 June 2022 Johnson said: "At the moment I'm thinking actively about the third term and what could happen then, but I will review that when I get to it."

==== Domestic policy ====
===== Repeal of the Fixed-term Parliaments Act =====
In December 2020, the government published a draft Fixed-term Parliaments Act 2011 (Repeal) Bill, later retitled the Dissolution and Calling of Parliament Bill when it was laid before Parliament in May 2021, which would ultimately repeal the 2011 Fixed-term Parliaments Act, revive the prerogative powers of the monarch to dissolve Parliament (at the request of the prime minister), and ensure that a Parliament is automatically dissolved five years after it first met (17 December 2024) and polling day being 25 working days later (24 January 2025).

The Dissolution and Calling of Parliament Bill was granted Royal Assent on 24 March 2022, meaning that the prime minister will again be able to request the monarch to dissolve Parliament and call an early election, with 25 working days' notice.

===== Elections Act =====
The Elections Act 2022 was introduced to the House of Commons in July 2021, and received Royal Assent in April 2022. The requirement would apply to UK general elections, English local elections, and police and crime commissioner elections in England and Wales.

This was the first time that voter photo identification for in-person voting in the United Kingdom was implemented. The act was criticised for permitting as acceptable voter identification "an Older Person's Bus Pass, an Oyster 60+ Card, a Freedom Pass", while not allowing 18+ student Oyster cards, national railcards, or student ID cards. Critics have said the list discriminates against younger people, who more often vote Labour. Between 2010 and 2018, there were just two convictions for voter fraud. According to academic research presented to the House of Commons, these changes may result in 1.1 million fewer voters at the next general election due to the photo ID requirement.

Another controversial amendment was granting the government new powers over the independent elections regulator. The Electoral Commission has said it is "concerned" about its independence from political influence in the future.

Key elements of the act were opposed by parliamentary committees, the House of Lords, the Electoral Commission, devolved governments, and academics. Changes proposed by the House of Lords were rejected by Boris Johnson's government. William Wallace, Baron Wallace of Saltaire, described it as a "nefarious piece of legislation" that is "shabby and illiberal".

==== Foreign affairs ====
===== Russian invasion of Ukraine =====
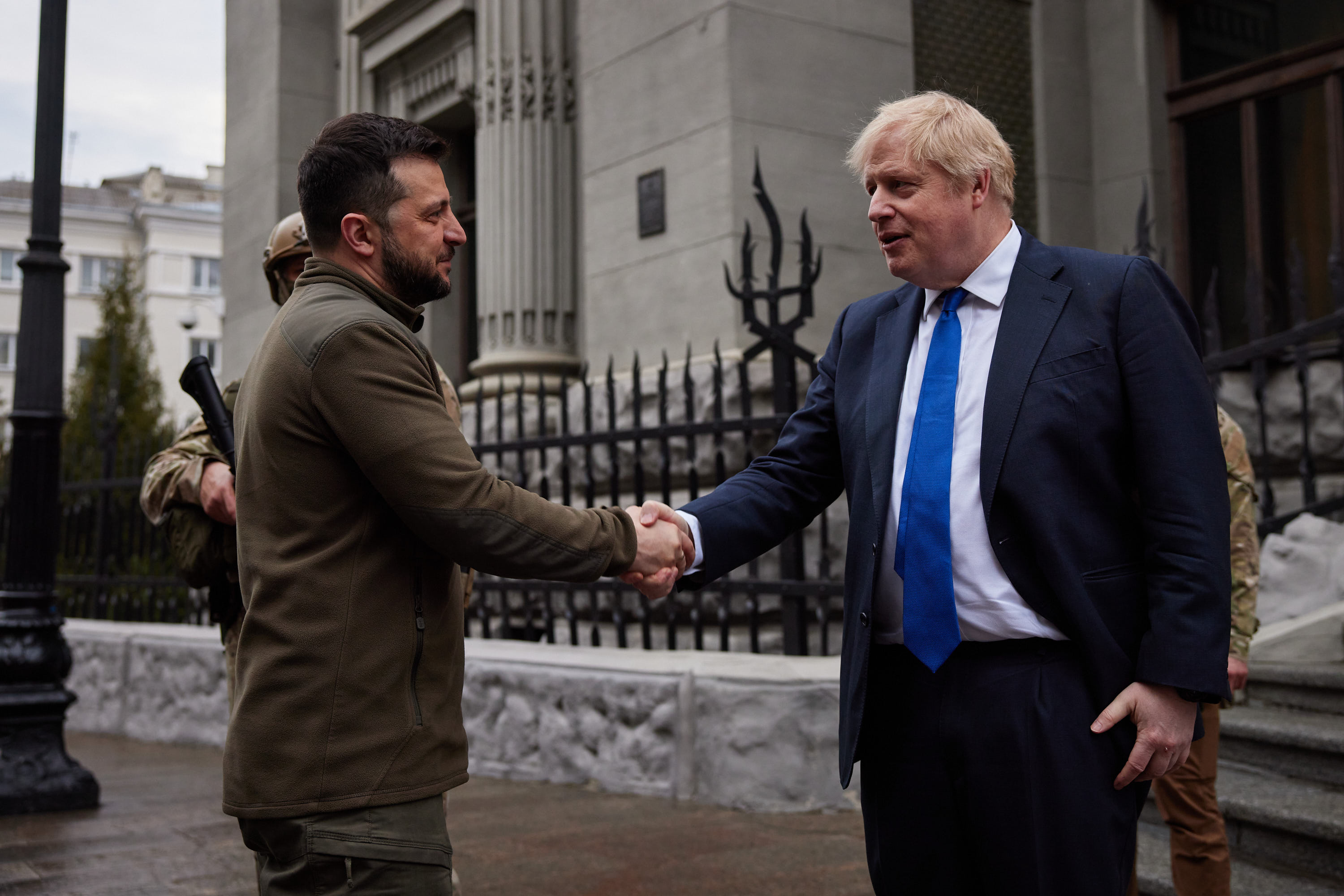
Johnson with Ukrainian President Volodymyr Zelenskyy during his visit to Kyiv in April 2022.

During the prelude to the Russian invasion of Ukraine, Johnson's government warned the Russian Government not to invade Donbas. Despite this, Johnson's Foreign Secretary Liz Truss told BBC News that British troops were "unlikely" to be deployed. In a phone call to President Vladimir Putin, Johnson urged him to "avoid bloodshed". Johnson and Putin agreed in a phone call to work towards a "peaceful resolution". On 1 February and 9 April 2022, Johnson arrived in Kyiv on a diplomatic visit, becoming the first leader of a major Western power to visit Kyiv during the crisis. He called the presence of the Russian Armed Forces near the Russia–Ukraine border "the biggest security crisis that Europe has faced for decades". On 20 February 2022, Johnson warned that Russia is planning the "biggest war in Europe since 1945" as Putin intends to invade and encircle Kyiv.

In response to the invasion, the UK Government placed several sanctions on the Russian Government. For example, the UK has excluded key Russian banks from the UK financial system, frozen the assets of all Russian banks, barred Russian firms from borrowing money, and placed limits on deposits Russians can make at UK banks. The UK also promised to phase out Russian oil imports by the end of 2022. The UK has also stopped the sale of "golden visas", which allowed wealthy Russians to get British residency rights. The UK increased import tariffs by 35% percent on a number of goods from Russia and Belarus.

On 8 March 2022, President Zelenskyy was invited to address the UK Parliament virtually where he thanked the UK for its support and urged the government to tighten sanctions on Russia. He compared the stand that Ukraine is taking against Vladimir Putin to that which the UK took against Germany in the Second World War. He said: "Just in the same way you didn't want to lose your country when Nazis started to fight your country, you had to fight." President Zelenskyy then evoked Winston Churchill's most famous speech of defiance, in which he promised to fight "on the beaches", saying: "We'll fight in the forests, on the shores, in the streets."

In March 2022, at the Conservative Party's spring conference in Blackpool, Johnson was criticised for comparing the struggle of Ukrainians fighting Russia's invasion to people in Britain voting for Brexit. Since the start of the crisis, the Government has provided £2.3 billion in military support to Ukraine.

===== Rwanda asylum policy =====
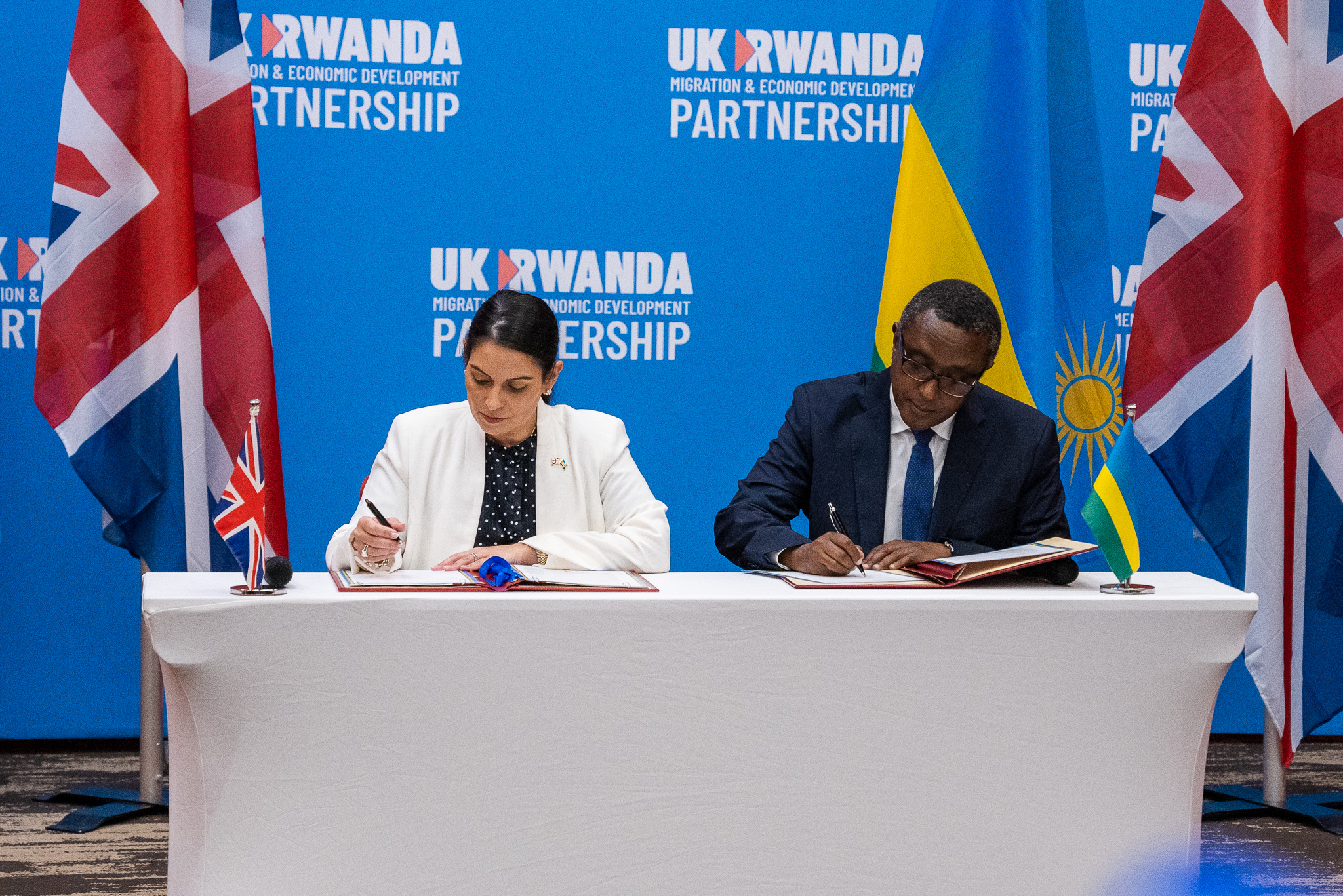
British home secretary Priti Patel (left) and Rwandan foreign minister Vincent Biruta (right) enacting the policy on 14 April 2022

The UK and Rwanda Migration and Economic Development Partnership was announced in April 2022. It is an immigration policy whereby individuals identified by the United Kingdom as being illegal immigrants or asylum seekers would be relocated to Rwanda for processing, asylum and resettlement. This policy originated in the backdrop of increased English Channel migrant crossings with more than 13,000 people having made the crossing from France between January and August 2022, with around 8,000 arriving since the Rwanda policy was launched. This came with growing political pressure to address the crossings. Those successful in claiming asylum will remain in Rwanda and not be permitted to return to the United Kingdom. The first flight under this plan received legal clearance from the High Court and was scheduled for 14 June 2022. A last-minute interim measure by the European Court of Human Rights (ECHR) led to the flight being cancelled, after stating that the High Court in London must first fully examine whether the removals policy is lawful. A hearing is scheduled for September 2022.

Its stated aims are to decrease the amount of migrant crossings in the English channel, stop human smuggling, and boost Rwandan investment and development. Johnson said it would "save countless lives" and would break the business model of "vile people smugglers". The United Kingdom will pay Rwanda an "economic transformation and integration fund" amounting to £120 million, and will also fund each immigrant between £20,000 and £30,000 for their relocation and temporary accommodation in the scheme.

On 10 June 2022, The Times reported that Prince Charles had privately described the plan as "appalling" and feared that it would overshadow the Commonwealth Heads of Government meeting in Rwanda on 23 June, where the Prince represented the Queen. The opposition criticised the scheme saying that in the past Rwanda had shot asylum seekers because they protested about food shortages, and had sent asylum seekers back to Syria and Afghanistan. The opposition also said that Patel was failing to get a better agreement with France to prevent people crossing the Channel because relevant relationships with France had broken down. In July 2022, the High Court heard that Whitehall officials had initially excluded Rwanda on human rights grounds from the list of potential partners for asylum transfers. One man on the flight that was cancelled due to legal challenges by the ECHR told the BBC he would "prefer to die" than be sent to Rwanda. In August 2022, the BBC reported that supportive ministers of the policy had been warned by their own advisers that the Rwandan government had previously tortured and killed political opponents.

==== Scandals ====
In January 2022 experts at the Centre for the Study of Corruption at the University of Sussex maintained Johnson's administration was more corrupt "than any UK government since the Second World War" and feared serious consequences for the UK if it continued.

===== Partygate =====
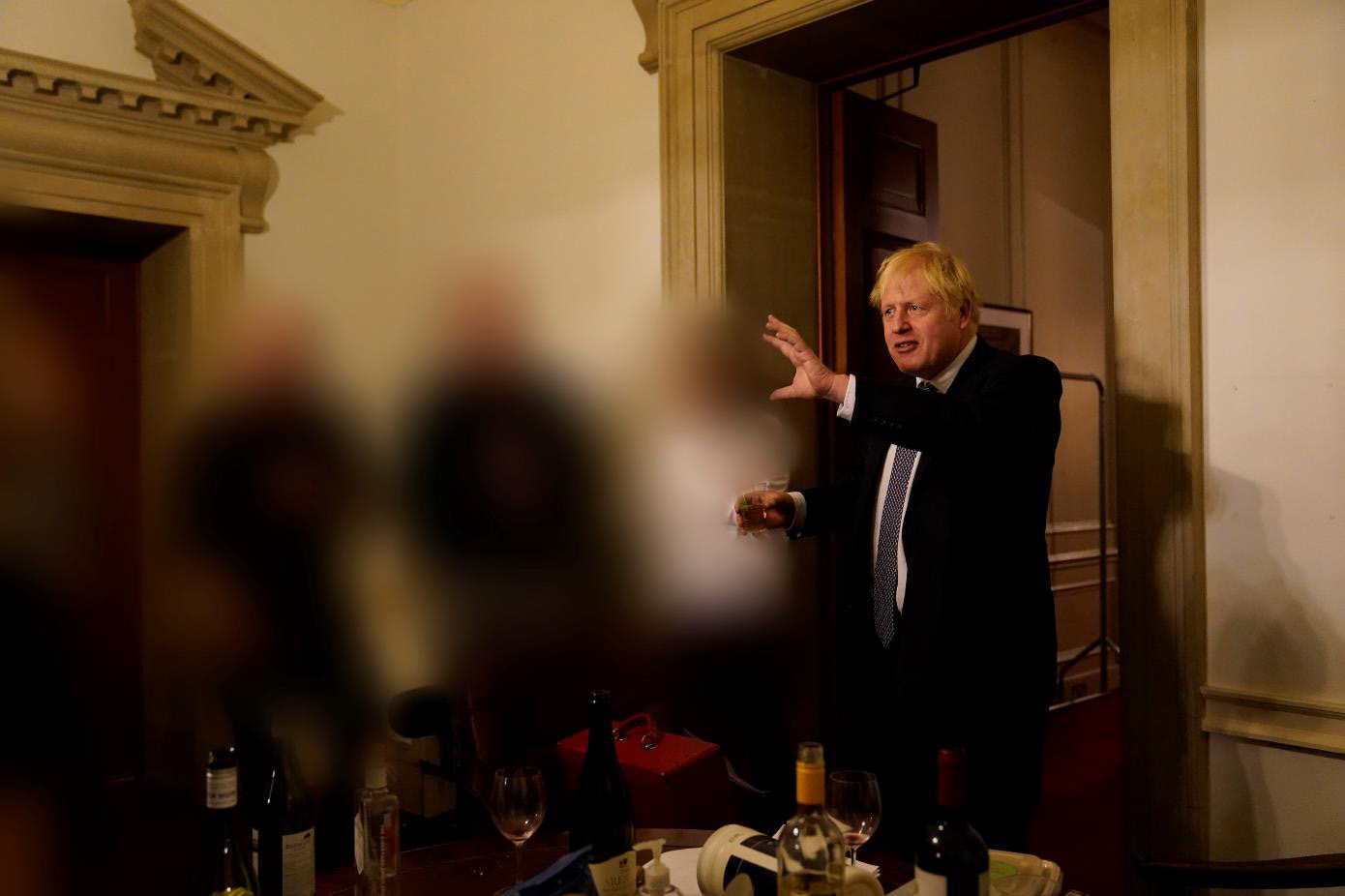
Johnson at one of the 2020 gatherings at which some attendees breached COVID-19 regulations. Reports of these gatherings led to the Partygate scandal, which ultimately played a role in Johnson's resignation as prime minister.

Beginning in December 2021, the media reported that there had been social gatherings by the Conservative Party and UK government staff during public health restrictions due to the COVID-19 pandemic. These included an occasion in which Johnson and the spouse of the prime minister of the United Kingdom Carrie Johnson were pictured with seventeen staff members having cheese and wine in the garden of 10 Downing Street during the first COVID-19 lockdown in the United Kingdom, which the prime minister's official spokesperson later said was a "work meeting". Johnson admitted attending "socially distanced drinks" organised by Martin Reynolds, Johnson's principal private secretary, during the same lockdown. Johnson said he thought it was a "work meeting", while Dominic Cummings, who was an adviser to Johnson at the time, said that he had warned the prime minister against it. There were other events reported involving Johnson and his staff. An inquiry into the allegations was begun by the cabinet secretary Simon Case, but after it was reported that his own office had held a party in December 2020, the inquiry was passed to Sue Gray, another senior civil servant. There was negative reaction against Johnson from Conservative MPs, with some calling for him to resign. Johnson said "nobody said this was something that was against the rules" and that he took "full responsibility for what took place". Johnson, his wife Carrie, and Chancellor of the Exchequer Rishi Sunak all received fixed penalty notices from the police.

Conservative Party rules mean that a confidence vote is triggered by 15% of MPs sending letters to 1922 Committee chairman Graham Brady. There were reports that the threshold would be reached imminently in January 2022. The Guardian reported that several Conservative MPs were waiting until Gray's report into the alleged parties before deciding whether to send letters to Brady. The Conservative MP Christian Wakeford defected to the Labour Party on 19 January 2022, saying that Johnson and the Conservative Party were "incapable of offering the leadership and government this country deserves". The New Statesman reported that some Conservative MPs were delaying sending letters to Brady after Wakeford's defection demonstrated that division in the Conservative Party benefitted Labour. Around the same time, the Conservative MP William Wragg said that his party's whips were using blackmail and threats of withdrawing funding in MPs' constituencies to secure their votes. Another Conservative MP, Nus Ghani, said that a whip had told her that her practice of Islam was discussed when deciding to fire her from her ministerial role in 2020. Wragg and Ghani were vice-chairs of the 1922 Committee, which was said to be considering reducing the period after an unsuccessful vote of no confidence before which a new vote could be triggered from twelve months to six months. The Times reported these as all being serious threats to Johnson being able to remain in his position.

Sunak was thought by some cabinet ministers to be "plotting against" Johnson. The Times reported that his supporters were planning for him to lend votes to another candidate so that the foreign secretary Liz Truss, seen as his main rival, would not reach the final two candidates. On 3 February 2022, when eight MPs had publicly announced that they had submitted letters of no confidence in Johnson, the Financial Times reported that "backbenchers estimate the actual number to be in the region of 30". After the Sue Gray report was published on 25 May, several Tory MPs called for Johnson to resign. By 31 May 17 Conservative MPs had publicly announced they had sent in a letter of no confidence to the 1922 committee. Forty-one Conservative MPs questioning Johnson's position. The Times reported that one rebel believed the true number of letters to be "up to 67", with another backbencher saying 190 MPs could vote against Johnson, enough to remove him.

====== Sue Gray report ======
In response to Partygate, the Cabinet Secretary and Head of the Home Civil Service Simon Case initiated and led an investigation into the allegations of partying during lockdown. A few days later he recused himself after it became known that an event had been held in his own office, and subsequently Sue Gray took over the investigation on whether Prime Minister Boris Johnson knew about and participated in gatherings at Downing Street.

Gray's initial findings were published on 31 January 2022. In the report, Gray condemned "a serious failure" in the standards of leadership, and also stated that a string of gatherings were "difficult to justify" while millions were unable to meet their friends and relatives. Publication of the full report was postponed pending the completion of an investigation by the Metropolitan Police. Gray's final report was delivered to Johnson on 25 May 2022 and it was published later that morning.

====== Fixed penalty notices ======
On 25 January 2022, the Metropolitan Police's chief commander, Cressida Dick, announced that they were commencing investigations into the Downing Street Parties. Dick stated that "potential breaches of Covid-19 regulations" at Downing Street and Whitehall over the last two years would be looked into. On 12 April 2022 the police made a second batch of (at least 20) referrals to the ACRO Criminal Records Office of fixed penalty notices (FPN) of £50 for breaches of COVID-19 regulations. Downing Street later confirmed that Johnson, as well as his wife and Sunak would be receiving fines. Therefore, Johnson became the first ever serving prime minister to have been sanctioned for breaking the law whilst in office. The police reported in May 2022 that their inquiries had resulted in 126 FPNs being issued. Matt Fowler of Covid-19 Bereaved Families for Justice said: "It's plain as day that there was a culture of boozing and rule breaching at the highest level of government, whilst the British public was making unimaginable sacrifices to protect their loved ones and communities". Keir Starmer called for Johnson to resign and Ed Davey suggested that Parliament be recalled to hold a no confidence vote in Johnson.

===== Jimmy Savile remarks relating to Keir Starmer =====
While speaking in the House of Commons on 31 January 2022, Johnson falsely blamed Starmer for the non-prosecution of Jimmy Savile, a DJ and television personality at the BBC who was a serial child sex offender, when Starmer was Director of Public Prosecutions (DPP) in the Crown Prosecution Service (CPS). Starmer was DPP in the years immediately prior to Savile's death but there is no evidence he was involved in the decision to not have him prosecuted. Johnson was heavily criticised for the comment and his policy adviser Munira Mirza resigned three days later, saying in her resignation letter that Johnson had made "a scurrilous accusation" against Starmer. Also on 3 February, during an interview with Sky News, Johnson would not apologise for his comment and tried to defend it by stating that, in 2013, Starmer apologised because the CPS had not investigated Savile; however, Johnson then said: "I totally understand that he [Starmer] had nothing to do personally with those decisions".

On 7 February, while Starmer and his colleague David Lammy were leaving Parliament, they were ambushed by a group of people who shouted abuse at Starmer including the words "traitor" and "Jimmy Savile". Two people, a man and a woman, were arrested after a traffic cone was thrown at police officers. Johnson tweeted that it was "absolutely disgraceful" and thanked the police for acting swiftly. Shayan Sardarizadeh for BBC Monitoring said that the protest was an attempt to recreate the Ottawa "freedom convoy" protests in the UK, and noted that the activists' references to Magna Carta indicated that the protesters were members of the sovereign citizen movement. Julian Smith, the former chief whip, and Simon Hoare were among Conservatives who called for Johnson to apologise. MP Kim Leadbeater and Brendan Cox, the sister and husband of murdered MP Jo Cox, warned against politicians lending credence to far-right conspiracy theories. The following day, a Downing Street source said that Johnson still would not apologise for the slur against Starmer.

Following the incident when activists forced police to protect Starmer and Lammy extremists issued multiple death threats against Starmer and other Labour MPs. The Center for Countering Digital Hate (CCDH) sent material to the Metropolitan Police. Imran Ahmed of the CCDH stated, "Every time a violent extremist makes a threat of violence and gets away with it, the norms of those groups worsen, and others are driven to newer depths of behaviour."

===== Lebedev meetings =====
During a select committee hearing on 6 July 2022, Boris Johnson confirmed that he had met Alexander Lebedev, a former KGB agent, on 28 April 2018, when he was Foreign Secretary, without any officials present. The meeting took place at a villa in Umbria, Italy, belonging to Alexander Lebedev's son Evgeny Lebedev, the day after a NATO summit in Brussels, Belgium, in the aftermath of the Salisbury poisonings. On 29 April 2018, the day after the meeting, The Guardian reported that Johnson travelled to Italy without a police escort. Whilst in Perugia Airport on 29 April 2018, fellow passengers on his flight reported that Johnson was "looking like he had slept in his clothes" as well as "struggling to walk in a straight line and telling other passengers he had had a heavy night." The meeting drew questions around national security from the opposition.

While Johnson was the Mayor of London, he took at least four trips to the villa of Evgeny Lebedev (a Russian-British businessman who owns Lebedev Holdings Ltd which owns the Evening Standard and The Independent) with Johnson quoted in 2011 as saying that "I am proud to call him a friend".

In July 2020, Johnson nominated Evgeny Lebedev as a cross-bench peer in the House of Lords which drew criticism with suggestions of cronyism. In March 2020, the House of Lords Appointments Commission had written to the prime minister advising him against granting Lebedev a lifetime seat in the Lords because the appointment posed a national security risk. Concerns were also raised by security services. In March 2020, two days after the initial rejection, Johnson was reported to have met Lebedev at his home. By June 2020, Cabinet Office officials advised that the security services no longer deemed his peerage as problematic and Lebedev assumed office into the House of Lords as a life peer on 17 December 2020. The Sunday Times reported that Johnson had gone ahead with granting the peerage despite the security service assessment which Johnson subsequently denied.

===== Sex scandals =====
In mid-2022, four sex scandals involving Conservative MPs were reported in the media along with the conviction for sexual assault of another. These scandals provoked conversations regarding the behaviour and culture in Westminster. In particular, the Chris Pincher scandal was cited as a key contributor in the July 2022 United Kingdom government crisis and the subsequent resignation of Boris Johnson as the leader of the Conservative Party.

In April 2022, David Warburton, the Conservative Member of Parliament (MP) for Somerton and Frome had the Conservative whip withdrawn pending the outcome of an investigation by Parliament's ICGS into allegations that he sexually harassed three women. Following his suspension, he said he had not been notified of the details of the allegations by the ICGS but that he denied them. Warburton allegedly asked for cocaine to be bought. The woman complainant said he got into bed with her, naked. She alleged that he ground against her and groped her breasts after she stated repeatedly she did not want sex with him.

In May 2022, an unnamed Conservative MP was ordered to keep away from Parliament as he had been arrested on suspicion of rape and other crimes. The MP remains anonymous and has not yet been charged as of August 2022.

====== Imran Ahmad Khan ======
In 2021, Imran Ahmad Khan, the Conservative Member of Parliament (MP) for Wakefield was charged under the Sexual Offences Act 2003 with having sexually assaulted a 15-year-old boy in 2008. Ahmad Khan denied the accusation "in the strongest terms". In response to the charge, the Conservative Party suspended the whip pending the outcome of the prosecution. On 11 April 2022, following a week-long trial in the Southwark Crown Court, he was convicted of sexual assault. The Conservative Party expelled Ahmad Khan from the party following the conviction. He resigned as an MP on 3 May and was jailed for 18 months on 23 May.

====== Neil Parish ======
On 29 April Neil Parish, the Conservative Member of Parliament (MP) for Tiverton and Honiton had the Conservative whip withdrawn after being accused of watching pornography on a personal mobile phone in the Commons chamber. Parish referred himself to the Commons Select Committee on Standards following the removal of the whip. The allegation was made by a female Conservative minister, and later corroborated by another unnamed MP.

Initially, Parish said that he might have viewed the pornography by mistake. He subsequently told the BBC that he had watched pornography in the Palace of Westminster on two occasions, first accidentally and then deliberately. He said that he had been initially looking at a website about tractors. According to Parish, he then reached "another website with a very similar name" and "watched for a bit". He said: "My crime – biggest crime – is that on another occasion I went in a second time ... that was [while] sitting waiting to vote."

On 30 April 2022, Parish announced his intention to resign as an MP, which triggered the 2022 Tiverton and Honiton by-election on 23 June 2022. On 4 May, he was appointed as Crown Steward and Bailiff of the Manor of Northstead, disqualifying him as an MP and vacating his seat.

====== Chris Pincher ======
On 30 June 2022, Chris Pincher, the Conservative Member of Parliament (MP) for Tamworth resigned as a Government Deputy Chief Whip after he admitted he had "drunk far too much" the night before at the Carlton Club, a private members' club, in St James's, London, and having "embarrassed myself and other people". It was alleged that he had groped two men. He was suspended as a Conservative MP but stayed in Parliament as an independent until his resignation as an MP in September 2023.

On 3 July 2022, six new allegations against Pincher emerged, involving behaviour over a decade. Three complaints are that Pincher made unwanted advances against other male MPs, one in a bar at the House of Commons and one in Pincher's parliamentary office. One complainant reportedly gave Downing Street details in February and expressed concerns over Pincher becoming a whip in charge of other MPs' welfare. Pincher maintained he had no intention of resigning as an MP.

In the following days, it emerged that Johnson had been briefed about Pincher's alleged misconduct in 2017, which Johnson had initially denied. Johnson was also alleged, by his former aid Dominic Cummings, to have described him as "Pincher by name, pincher by nature." On 5 July, the ex-top civil servant Simon McDonald published a letter to the Parliamentary Commissioner for Standards stating that the claim there had been no previous official complaints against Pincher were untrue. These false denials by Johnson and Pincher's appointment to deputy chief whip in spite of his history triggered a political scandal, which evolved into a government crisis resulted in Johnson announcing his intention to resign as Conservative Party leader and prime minister on 7 July 2022. Pincher continued to sit as an MP for another year, but did not make any further contributions in the House of Commons.

=== June 2022 confidence vote ===
On 6 June 2022, the publication of the Sue Gray report into Partygate and a widespread sense of general dissatisfaction towards Johnson's leadership among Conservative MPs for various disparate reasons, led to a vote of confidence among his Conservative colleagues. Graham Brady announced that the threshold of 54 letters of no confidence had been met and that a vote of confidence in Johnson would be held in the evening of the same day. A majority of Conservative MPs voted confidence in Johnson to continue as party leader. More than 40% of Conservative MPs voted no confidence, which The Guardian described as "a larger than expected rebellion".

Confidence vote of Boris Johnson
| Ballot → | 6 June 2022 |
| Confidence | 211 / 359 (59%) |
| No confidence | 148 / 359 (41%) |

==== Government crisis and resignation as leader ====
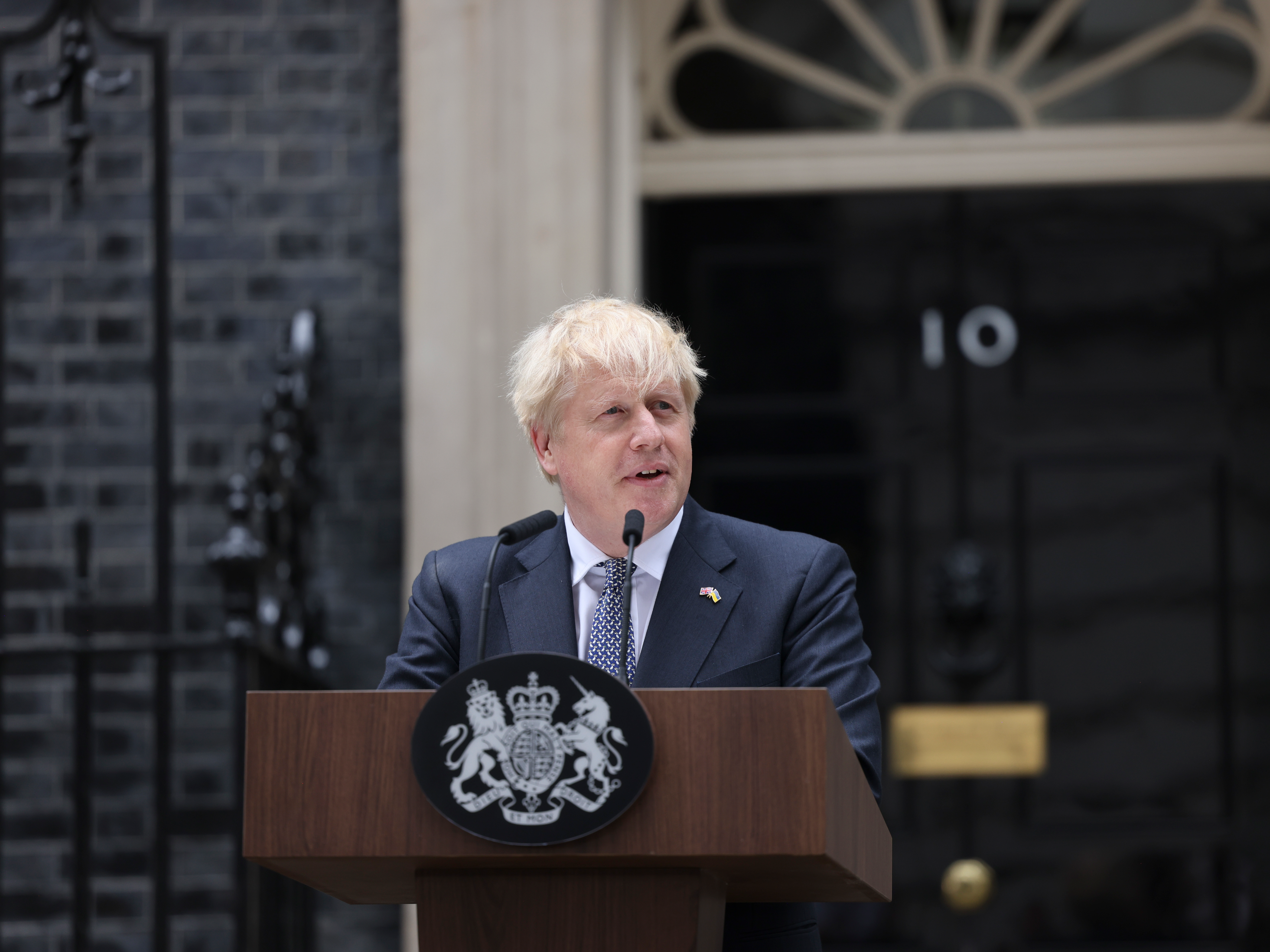
Johnson announces his resignation outside 10 Downing Street on 7 July 2022; he left office on 6 September.

In late June 2022, the Conservative MP Chris Pincher resigned as deputy chief government whip after allegations were made that he had groped two men. Johnson initially refused to suspend the whip from him, and his spokesperson defended his initial appointment, saying Johnson had not been aware of allegations against him. More allegations of groping were made against Pincher. The former permanent secretary to the foreign office Simon McDonald wrote that Johnson had been personally briefed on previous allegations against Pincher in 2019. On 4 July, Johnson admitted that he had known about allegations at the time he appointed him. Several ministers resigned on 5 July, including the chancellor of the Exchequer Sunak and the health secretary Javid. Several politicians who had been discussed as potential leadership candidates, including Truss, expressed their continuing support for Johnson. The journalist Tim Shipman wrote in The Times that the transport secretary Grant Shapps, who had kept records of supporters in the earlier confidence vote, told Johnson that he could only guarantee 28 votes of confidence if a new vote were called.

Johnson appointed the prospective leadership candidate Nadhim Zahawi as chancellor, with reports that Zahawi had threatened to resign unless he were given the role. He appointed Michelle Donelan as education secretary, Zahawi's previous role. Many more ministers resigned on 6 July. Several Conservative MPs, including the levelling-up secretary Gove, told Johnson he should resign. Johnson fired Gove the same day, citing disloyalty. The next day, Zahawi and Donelan called for Johnson to resign, with Donelan herself resigning from the cabinet. A poll by YouGov showed that 59% of Conservative Party members wanted Johnson to resign. Johnson announced his pending resignation on the same day, 7 July, saying a new leader would take office before October 2022. He would stay on as prime minister until his successor's election. Several Conservative MPs said he should step down as prime minister, and Starmer said he would call a parliamentary vote of no-confidence in the government if Johnson did not quickly resign as prime minister.

At Prime Minister's Questions on 13 July 2022, Johnson said that he would leave office "with my head held high." After the Labour Party called for a motion of no confidence, Johnson's government called a vote of confidence in itself, which they won. At his last Prime Minister's Questions, Johnson asked his successor to "stick by the Americans" and "stand by the Ukrainians," and quoted Arnold Schwarzenegger's "Hasta la vista, baby" catchphrase from the film Terminator 2: Judgment Day (1991) before receiving a standing ovation. Following the July–September 2022 Conservative Party leadership election, Johnson was succeeded as prime minister by Liz Truss, his foreign secretary.

== International prime ministerial trips ==
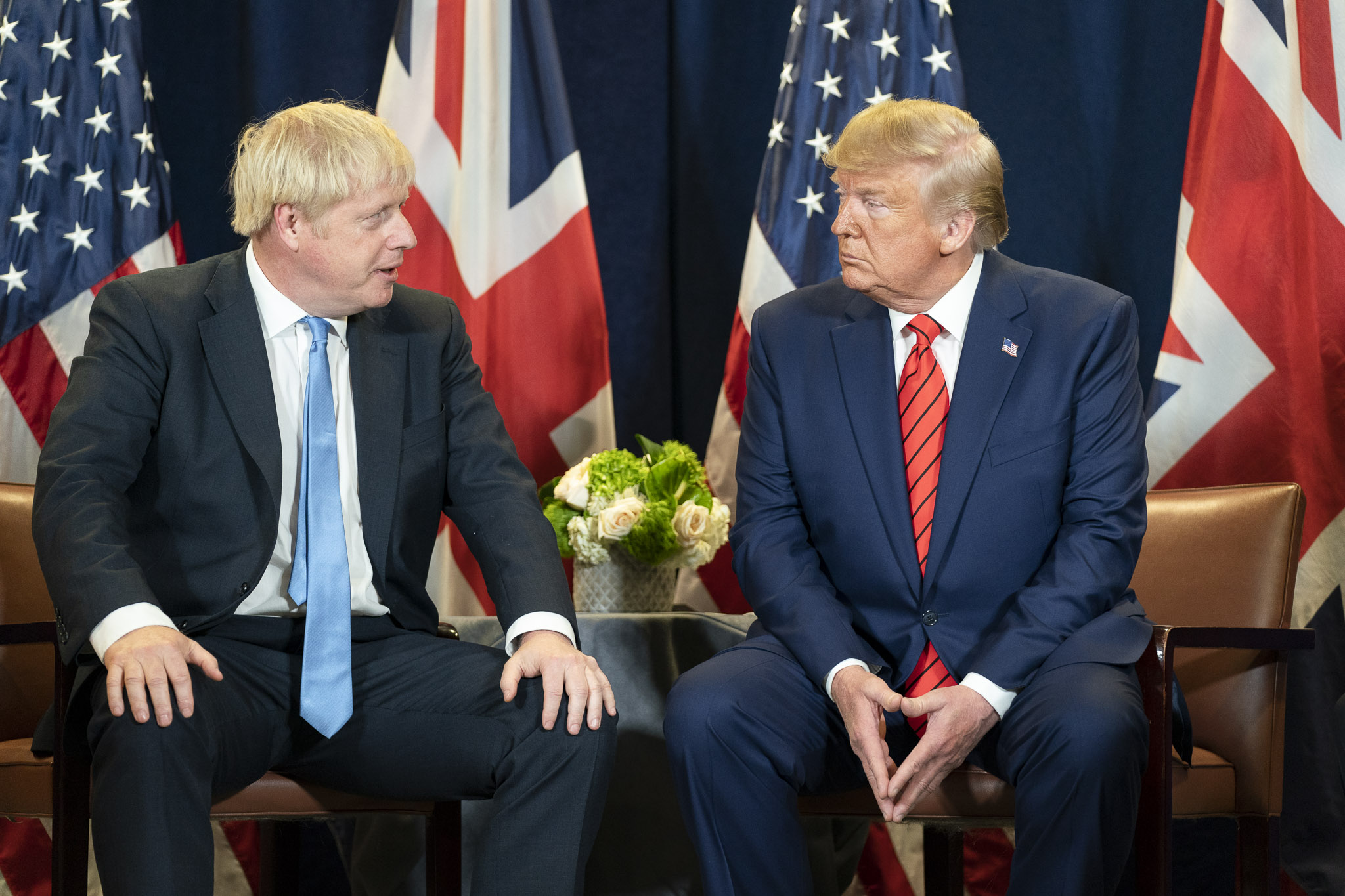
Johnson with President Donald Trump in New York City in 2019

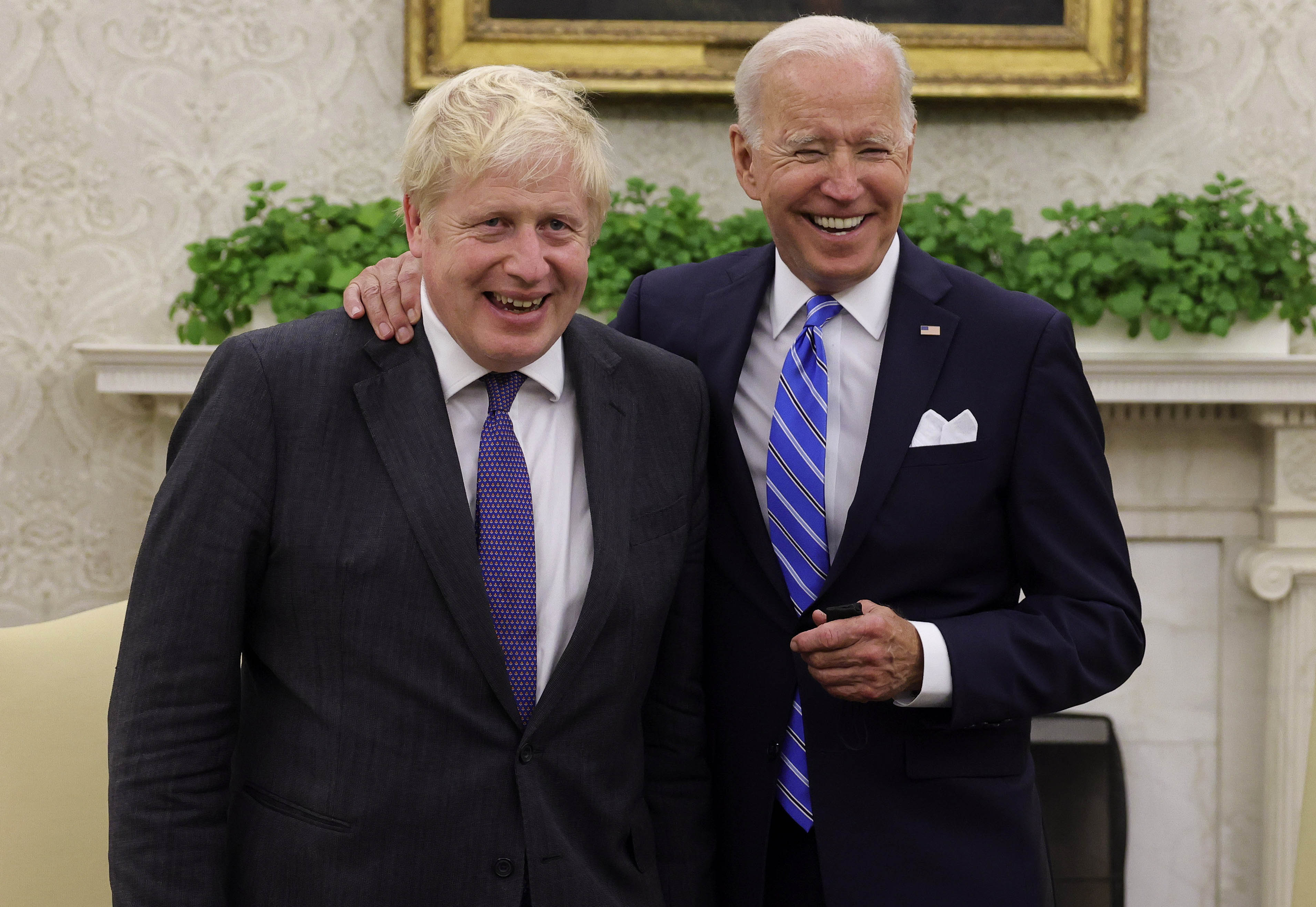
Johnson with President Joe Biden at the White House Oval Office in 2021

Johnson made 26 international trips to 18 countries during his premiership. The number of visits per country:

- One visit to Finland, India, Ireland, Italy, Luxembourg, Oman, Rwanda, Saudi Arabia, Spain, and Sweden
- Two visits to Estonia, France, Poland, the UAE and the United States.
- Four visits to Germany and Ukraine
- Five visits to Belgium

== See also ==
- 2010s in United Kingdom history
- 2020s in United Kingdom history
- Politics of the United Kingdom
- Boris Johnson as Foreign Secretary

== Sources ==
- Edwards, Giles; Isaby, Jonathan (2008). Boris v. Ken: How Boris Johnson Won London. London: Politico's. ISBN 978-1-84275-225-8.
- Fetzer, Thiemo (26 October 2021). "Subsidising the spread of COVID-19: Evidence from the UK'S Eat-Out-to-Help-Out Scheme*". The Economic Journal. 132 (643): 1200–1217. doi:10.1093/ej/ueab074. ISSN 0013-0133. PMC 8574521.
- Gimson, Andrew (2012). Boris: The Rise of Boris Johnson (2nd ed.). Simon & Schuster.
- Hutton, Georgina (22 December 2020). Eat Out to Help Out Scheme (PDF) (Report).
- Purnell, Sonia (2011). Just Boris: Boris Johnson: The Irresistible Rise of a Political Celebrity. London: Aurum Press Ltd. ISBN 978-1-84513-665-9.

British premierships
| Preceded by May | Johnson premiership 2019–2022 | Succeeded by Truss |
