= Out of the Blue =

Out of the Blue may refer to:

== Film and television ==
=== Film ===
- Out of the Blue (1931 film), a British musical by Gene Gerrard
- Out of the Blue (1947 film), an American comedy directed by Leigh Jason
- Out of the Blue: Live at Wembley, a 1980 concert film by Electric Light Orchestra
- Out of the Blue (1980 film), a Canadian film by Dennis Hopper
- Out of the Blue (television play), a 1991 British drama directed by Nick Hamm
- Out of the Blue (2003 film), an American documentary
- Out of the Blue (2006 film), a New Zealand film directed by Robert Sarkies
- Out of the Blue (2008 film), an Israeli film of 2008
- Out of the Blue (2013 film), an Italian comedy directed by Edoardo Leo
- Out of the Blue (2022 film), an American thriller written and directed by Neil LaBute

=== Television ===
- Out of the Blue (1979 TV series), an American sitcom
- Out of the Blue (1995 TV series), a British police drama
- Out of the Blue (1996 TV series), an American sitcom for teens
- Out of the Blue (1998 TV series), an Irish documentary series presented by Derek Davis
- Out of the Blue (2003 TV series), an Australian seafood and travel show
- Out of the Blue (2008 TV series), an Australian soap opera
- Out of the Blue (2011 TV series), a British programme co-hosted by Joanne Salley
- "Out of the Blue" (Battle for Dream Island), a 2024 animated web series episode
- "Out of the Blue" (El Chavo Animado), a season-three episode of El Chavo Animado
- "Out of the Blue" (A Remarkable Place to Die), a 2024 episode
- "Out of the Blue" (Sanctuary), a season-three episode of Sanctuary
- Out of the Blue Enterprises, or 9 Story USA, an American children's television company

== Music ==
=== Performers ===
- Out of the Blue (American band), a 1980s jazz ensemble
- Out of the Blue (British band), an all-male a cappella group from the University of Oxford and Oxford Brookes University
- Out of the Blue (Yale University), a co-ed a cappella group

=== Albums ===
- Out of the Blue (Alison Brown album) or the title song, 1998
- Out of the Blue (Anne Kirkpatrick album) or the title song, 1991
- Out of the Blue (Blue Mitchell album), 1959
- Out of the Blue (Carol Sloane album), 1962
- Out of the Blue (Claudia Carawan album), 2003
- Out of the Blue (Debbie Gibson album), or the title song (see below), 1987
- Out of the Blue (Donnie Iris album), 1992
- Out of the Blue (Electric Light Orchestra album), 1977
- Out of the Blue (Ferry Corsten album), released under the name System F, or the title song (see below), 2001
- Out of the Blue (Mike + The Mechanics album) or the title song, 2019
- Out of the Blue (Sonny Red album), 1960
- Out of the Blue (Systems in Blue album) or the title song, 2008
- Out of the Blue (EP), by the Angels, or the title song, 1979
- Out of the Blue, by "Blue" Gene Tyranny, 1977
- Out of the Blue, by Blue Raspberry, 2005
- Out of the Blue, by Blue Swede, 1975
- Out of the Blue, a West End musical cast recording released by Stage Door Records

=== Songs ===
- "Out of the Blue" (Debbie Gibson song), 1988
- "Out of the Blue" (Delta Goodrem song), 2004
- "Out of the Blue" (System F song), 1999
- "My My, Hey Hey (Out of the Blue)", by Neil Young, 1979
- "Out of the Blue", by Alan Parsons from The Time Machine, 1999
- "Out of the Blue", by Aly & AJ from Into the Rush, 2005
- "Out of the Blue", by the Band from The Last Waltz, 1978
- "Out of the Blue", by Chad Brownlee from Hearts on Fire, 2016
- "Out of the Blue", by David Gilmour from About Face, 1984
- "Out of the Blue", by Elton John from Blue Moves, 1976; closing theme of the TV series Top Gear, 1977–2001
- "Out of the Blue", by George Harrison from All Things Must Pass, 1970
- "Out of the Blue", by Julian Casablancas from Phrazes for the Young, 2009
- "Out of the Blue", by Michael Learns to Rock from Colours, 1993
- "Out of the Blue", by Miles Davis, 1951
- "Out of the Blue", by Robert Wyatt from Comicopera, 2007
- "Out of the Blue", by Roxy Music from Country Life, 1974
- "Out of the Blue", by Ryan Leslie from Ryan Leslie, 2009
- "Out of the Blue", by Tommy James and the Shondells, 1967
- "Out of the Blue", by Toyah from Dreamchild, 1997
- "Out of the Blue", by Wreckless Eric from Big Smash!, 1980
- "Out of the Blue", a composition by Hubert Bath used as theme music for Sports Report
- "Out of the Blue (Into the Fire)", by the The from Infected, 1986

== Other uses ==
- Out of the Blue (book), a 2022 biography of Liz Truss
- Out of the Blue (sculpture), a public art installation in Salt Lake City, Utah
- Out of the Blue, a 2008 novel by Belinda Jones
- Out of the Blue, a 2008 poetry book by Simon Armitage
- Out of the Blue, a musical by Shunichi Tokura
- Out of the Blue, an arts charity based at the Dalmeny Street drill hall

== See also ==
- Out of Blue, a 2018 film
- Out the Blue (disambiguation)
- Out of the Blues (disambiguation)
