= United Kingdom and the Russo-Ukrainian war =

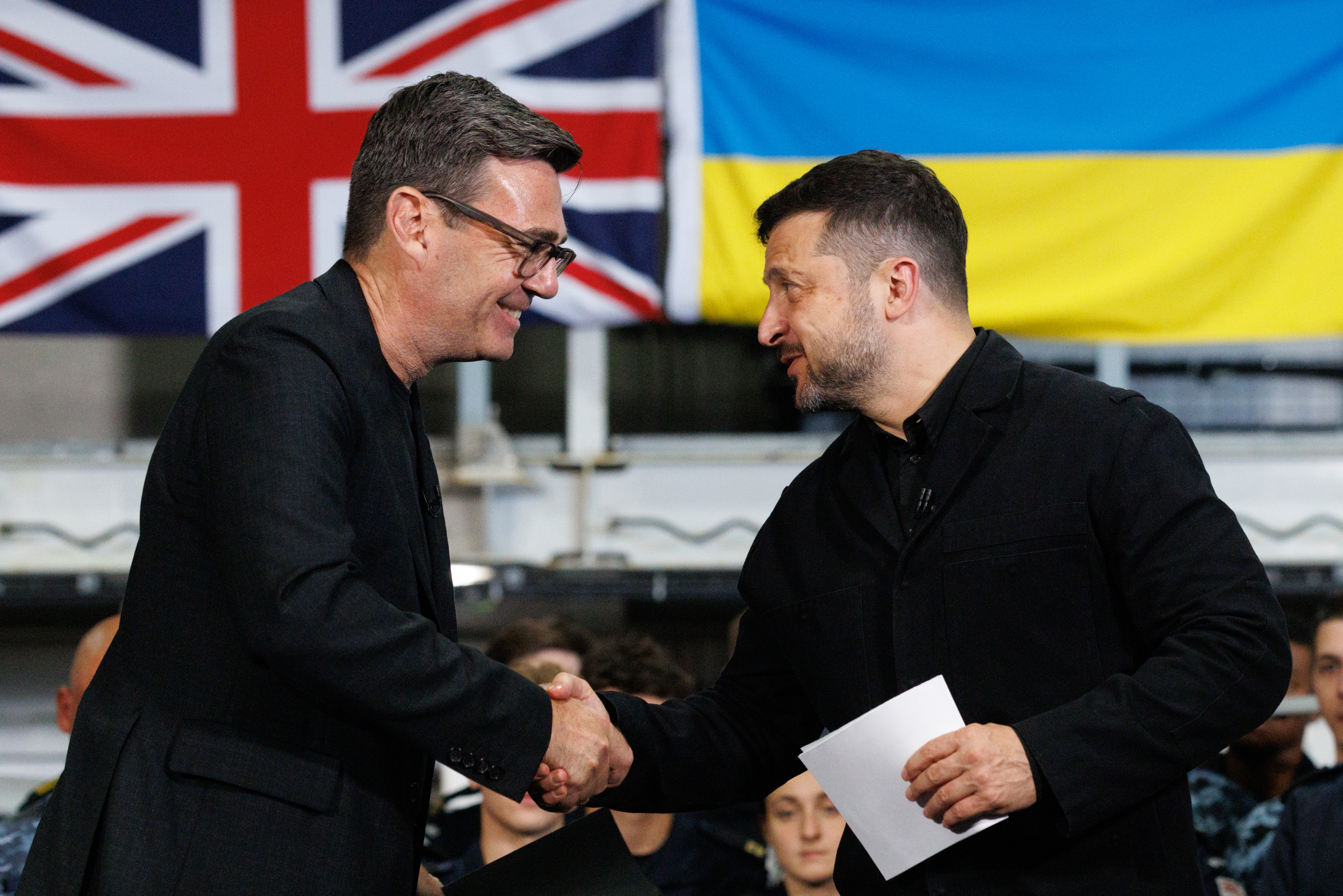
Prime Minister Andy Burnham with Ukraine President Volodymyr Zelenskyy, July 2026

The United Kingdom has supported Ukraine during the ongoing Russian invasion of Ukraine, during both Conservative and Labour governments. After it began on 24 February 2022, then Conservative Prime Minister Boris Johnson condemned the invasion, provided military and humanitarian aid to Ukraine, and sanctioned Russia and Belarus, the two countries most involved in invading Ukraine. Support to Ukraine has continued under prime ministers Liz Truss (who was Foreign Secretary at the time the invasion started), Rishi Sunak, Keir Starmer and incumbent Labour Prime Minister Andy Burnham.

Additionally in 2022, Nicola Sturgeon, the first minister of Scotland, and the Scottish Government provided both financial support and humanitarian aid to Ukraine during the invasion.

== History ==
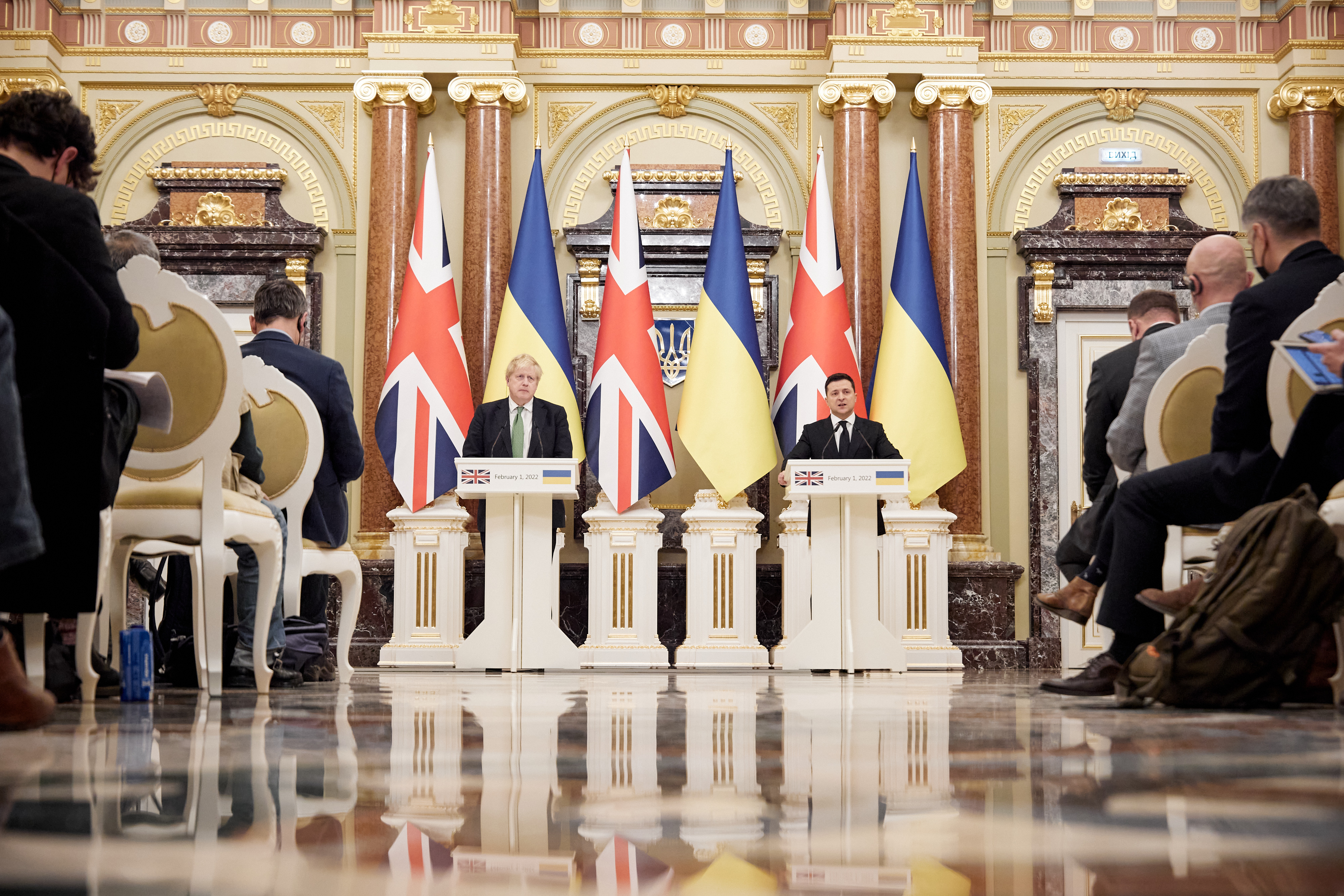
Boris Johnson and Zelenskyy during the former's visit to Ukraine twenty three days before the invasion, 1 February 2022

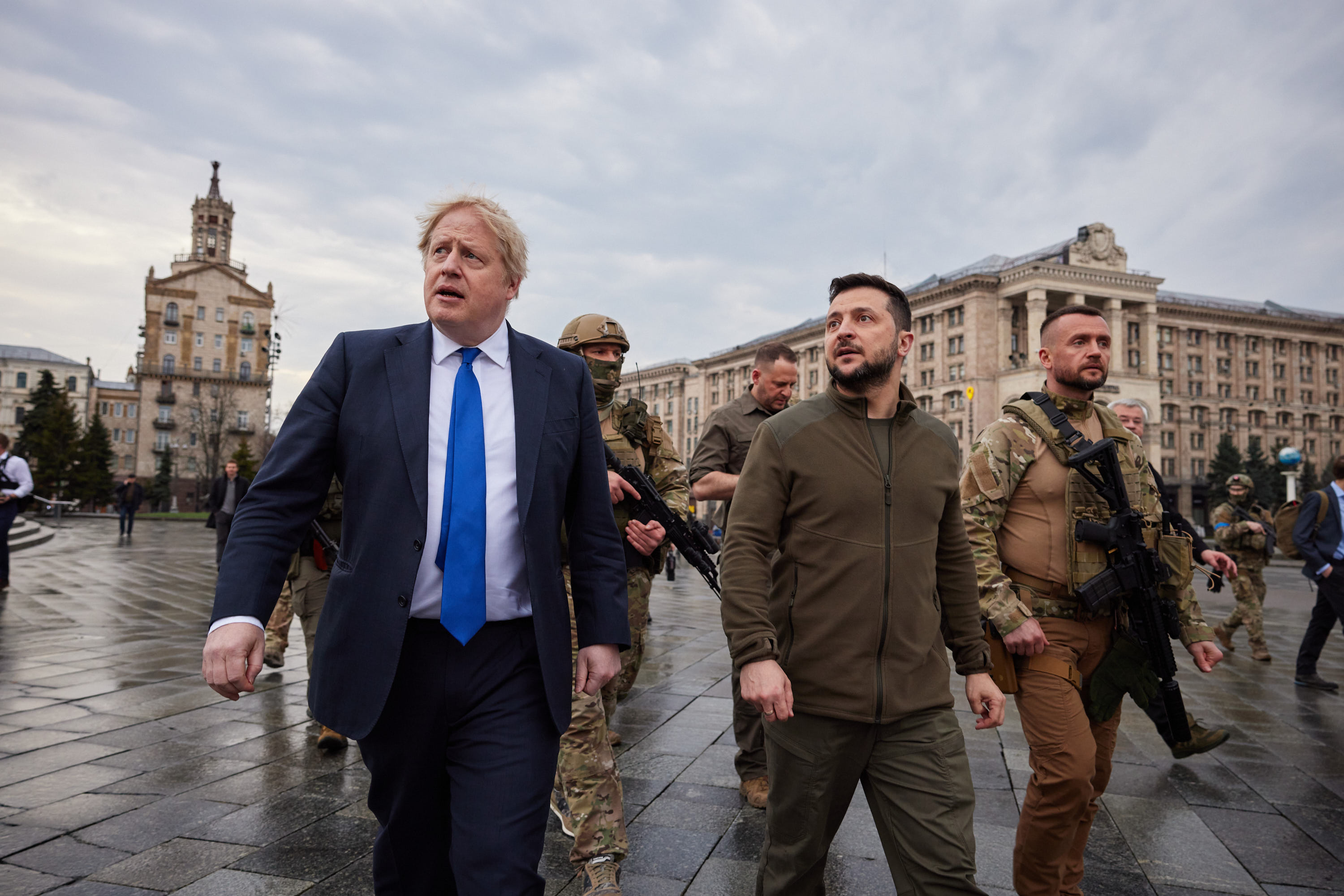
Boris Johnson walks on a street of war-hit Kyiv alongside Zelenskyy on 10 April 2022

In November 2021, Prime Minister Boris Johnson warned that the European Union faces "a choice" between "sticking up for Ukraine" and approving the Nord Stream 2 natural gas pipeline from Russia to Europe.

In early 2022 then foreign secretary Liz Truss turned her attention towards a build-up of Russian troops near the Russia–Ukraine border. Truss supported a plan which declassified a large amount of intelligence on Russia, releasing it to the public for the first time in order to weaken the Russian government in the event of an invasion. On 10 February 2022 she met the Russian foreign minister Sergey Lavrov in Moscow, becoming the first British minister to go on a diplomatic trip there since the 2018 Salisbury poisonings. The meeting was, according to Payne, a "disaster": Lavrov described it as being "between the dumb and the deaf", and the two ministers spoke over each other and found it difficult to communicate. Five days later, Truss stated that the world was on the "brink of war in Europe", which came to pass in the early hours of 24 February as Russia invaded Ukraine. Before the invasion and in its immediate aftermath, Truss advocated for sanctions on Russia and encouraged other G7 leaders to impose them; in March 2022 she stated that the sanctions would end only in the event of a "full ceasefire and withdrawal". Johnson praised Truss's actions, saying that "she was always terrific on Ukraine ... other governments faffed around ... she was very clear and focused".

During the prelude to the Russian invasion of Ukraine, Johnson's government warned the Russian Government not to invade Donbas. Johnson and Vladimir Putin agreed in a phone call to work towards a "peaceful resolution". On 1 February 2022, Johnson arrived in Kyiv on a diplomatic visit. He called the presence of the Russian Armed Forces near the Russia–Ukraine border "the biggest security crisis that Europe has faced for decades". The Kremlin denied that it wanted to attack Ukraine. On 20 February 2022, Johnson warned that Russia is planning the "biggest war in Europe since 1945" as Putin intends to invade and encircle Kyiv. On 21 February 2022, Johnson condemned Russia's diplomatic recognition of two self-proclaimed republics in Donbas.

Johnson condemned the Russian invasion of Ukraine, and ensured the UK joined in international sanctions on Russian banks and oligarchs. He later announced the UK would phase out Russian oil by the end of 2022. On 9 April 2022, Johnson travelled to Kyiv and met the President of Ukraine, Volodymyr Zelenskyy. On 16 April 2022, Russia's Ministry for Foreign Affairs banned Johnson and a number of senior British politicians from visiting Russia, saying that Britain aimed to isolate Russia politically and supply "the Kyiv regime with lethal weapons and coordinating similar efforts on the part of NATO".

Within Ukraine, Johnson is praised by many as a supporter of anti-Russian sanctions and military aid for Ukraine. On 3 May, Johnson virtually addressed the Ukrainian Parliament, becoming the first world leader to speak in Ukraine since the invasion. He pledged an extra £300m in military aid to Ukraine, praised Ukraine's resistance to Russia as its "finest hour" and said that the West had been "too slow to grasp what was actually happening" prior to Russia's invasion. In July 2022, Johnson warned that it would be a mistake to cease fire and freeze the conflict. In August 2022, Johnson blamed Putin for the emerging global energy crisis.

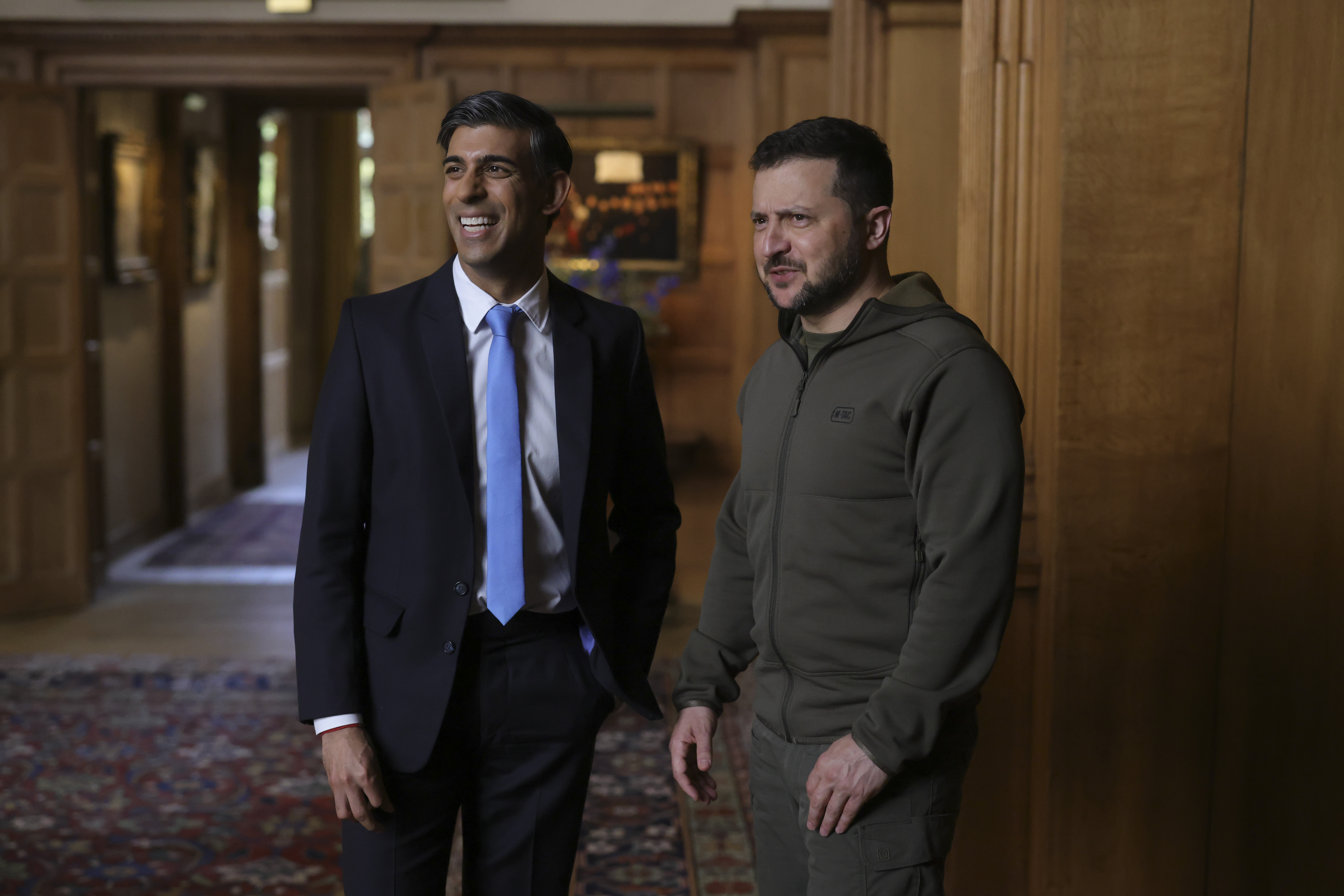
Rishi Sunak meets President of Ukraine Volodymyr Zelenskyy.

Following the 15 November missile explosion in Poland, Rishi Sunak met U.S. President Joe Biden and delivered a speech. and later met Zelenskyy, and pledged to give Ukraine £50 million in aid. After meeting Zelenskyy, Sunak said: "I am proud of how the UK stood with Ukraine from the very beginning. And I am here today to say the UK and our allies will continue to stand with Ukraine, as it fights to end this barbarous war and deliver a just peace." Sunak visited Ukraine on 12 January 2024 to sign a new U.K.-Ukraine Agreement on Security Cooperation with Zelenskyy promising £2.5 billion in military aid to Ukraine, including long-range missiles, artillery ammunition, air defence and maritime security, in addition to £200 million to be spent on military drones, making the United Kingdom the largest deliverer of drones to Ukraine out of any nation according to Downing Street.

David Cameron made his first working visit to Ukraine as foreign secretary on 16 November, meeting Zelenskyy in Kyiv, where he reiterated the UK's commitment to provide moral, diplomatic and "above all military support for... however long it takes". Cameron supported the February 2024 US Senate bill to allocate military aid to Ukraine Taiwan and Israel, saying that he did not want the West to "show weakness displayed against Vladimir Putin in 2008, when he invaded Georgia, or the uncertainty of the response in 2014, when he took Crimea and much of the Donbas—before coming back to cost us far more with his aggression in 2022".

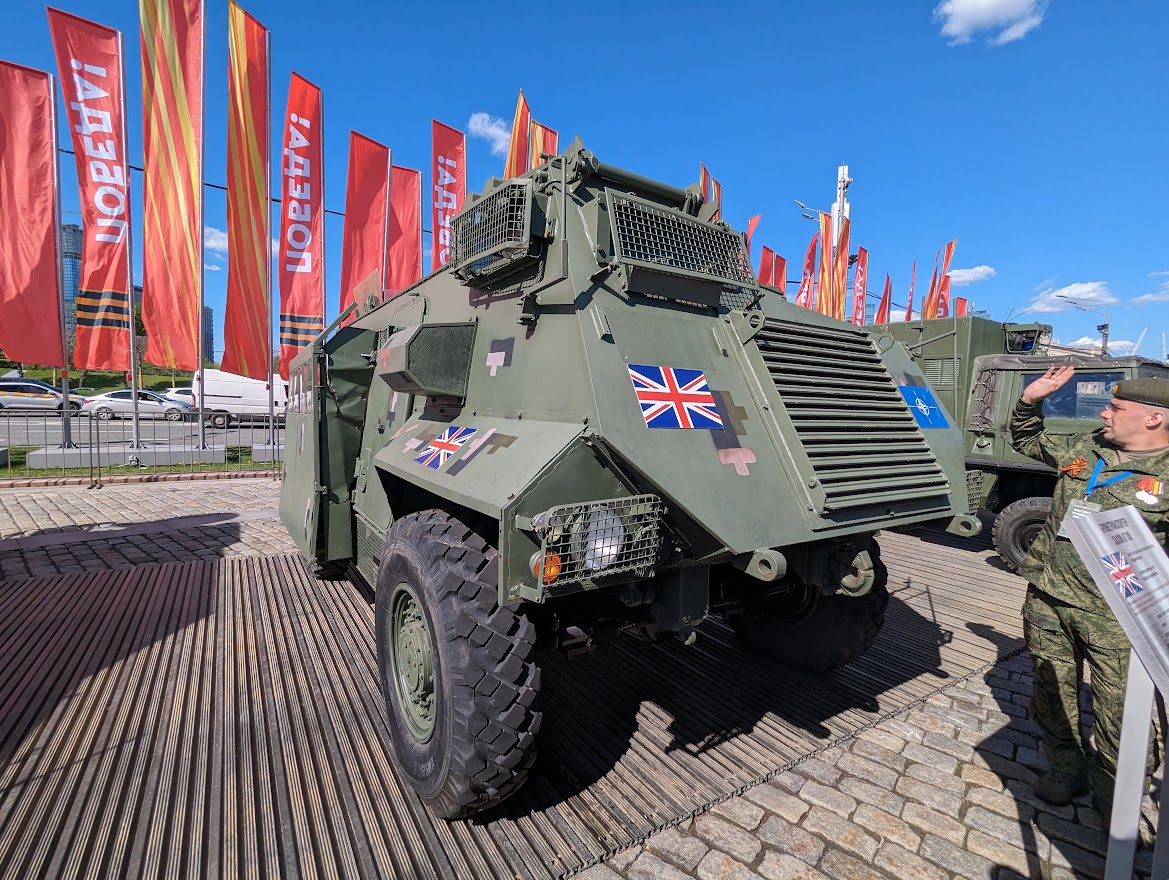
A captured AT105 Saxon in Ukrainian service on display at Moscow's Victory Park on Poklonnaya Hill, 2024

During the prelude to the Russian invasion of Ukraine, Keir Starmer met with Secretary General of NATO Jens Stoltenberg and said in an interview with the BBC that his predecessor Jeremy Corbyn was "wrong" to be a critic of NATO and that the Labour Party's commitment to NATO was "unshakeable"; he added that "stand united in the UK ... Whatever challenges we have with the [Boris Johnson's] government, when it comes to Russian aggression we stand together." Starmer called for "widespread and hard-hitting" economic sanctions against Russia. He also criticised the Stop the War Coalition in an op-ed for The Guardian, writing that the group's members were "not benign voices for peace" but rather "[a]t best they are naive, at worst they actively give succour to authoritarian leaders" such as Putin "who directly threaten democracies." In February 2023 he met Zelenskyy, and pledged support for Ukraine during the Russian invasion of the country; Starmer promised that if he became prime minister, there would be no change in Britain's position on the war in Ukraine. He also called for Russian leaders, including Putin, to be tried at The Hague for crimes against humanity. Starmer supported the International Criminal Court's issuance of an arrest warrant for Putin, after he was indicted in the ICC.

At the 2024 NATO summit, Starmer signalled that Ukraine could use Britain's donations to strike military targets inside Russia. In a meeting with Zelenskyy, Starmer called for an "irreversible" membership strategy for Ukraine to join NATO.

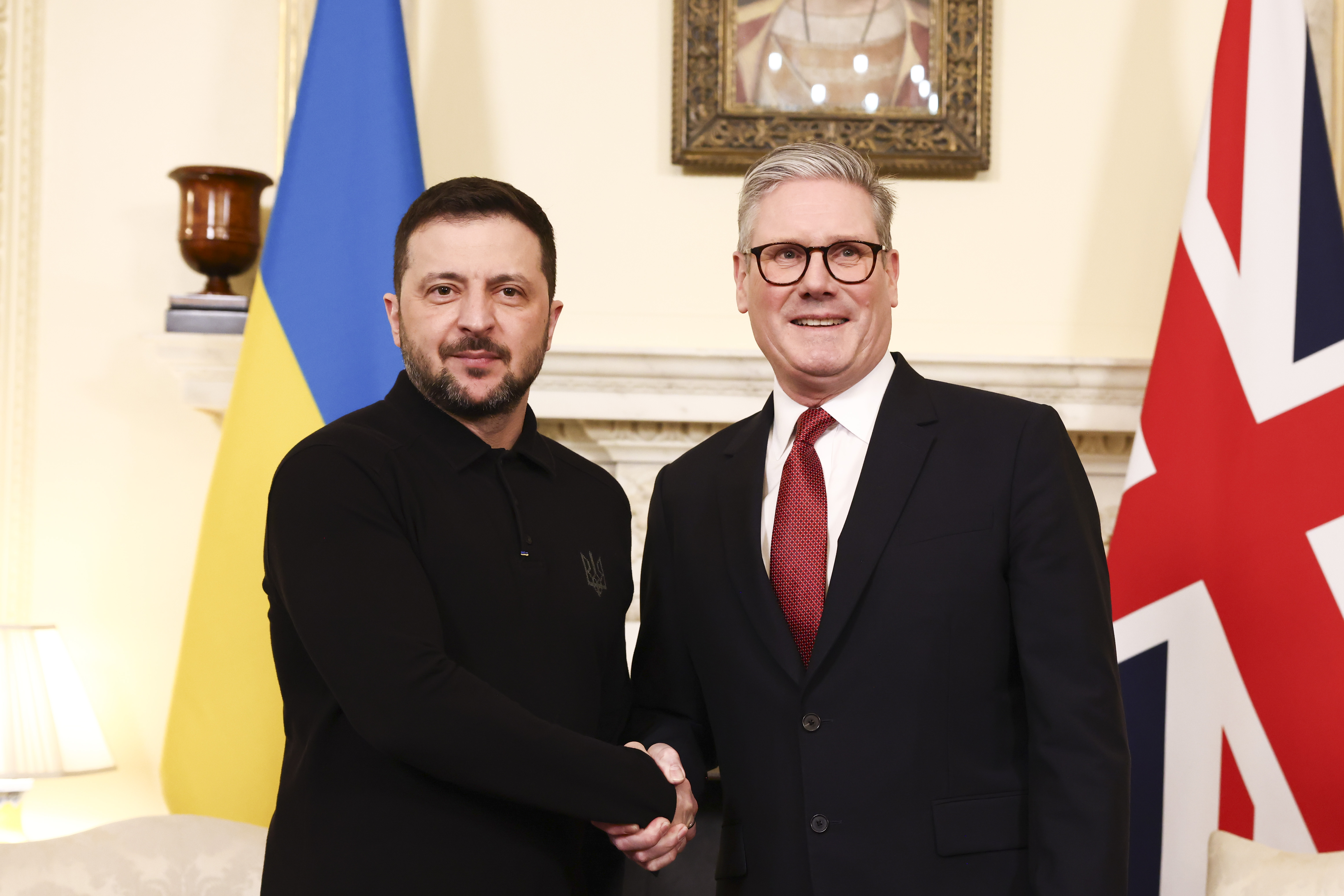
Keir Starmer with Ukraine President Volodymyr Zelenskyy, February 2025

In January 2025, Starmer announced that the UK would provide £4.5 billion in military support to Ukraine throughout 2025. He announced more military support for 2025 than in any previous year, including 150 artillery barrels and a new mobile air defence system called Gravehawk. On 16 January 2025, Starmer and Zelenskyy signed a landmark 100-Year Partnership Agreement in Kyiv.

In October 2025, Ukrainian forces successfully used British-supplied Storm Shadow missiles to strike a chemical plant in Bryansk, Russia. In December 2025, the Ukrainian military successfully targeted the Novoshakhtinsk oil refinery in Russia's Rostov region using Storm Shadow air-launched cruise missiles.

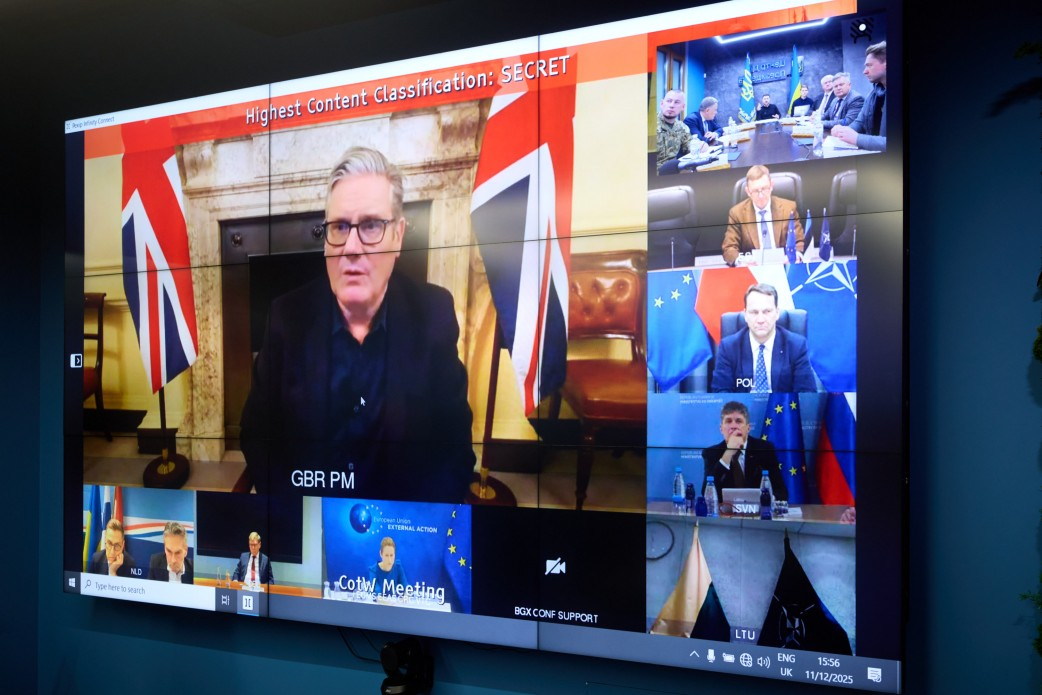
Starmer speaking at a virtual summit of the coalition of the willing on 11 December 2025

Starmer has actively urged NATO allies to "ramp up" the provision of long-range weapons. In 2025, Starmer's government significantly expanded the UK's commitment to Storm Shadow missiles through both replenishment of national stockpiles and new supplies for Ukraine. In October 2025, he hosted the coalition of the willing in London to push for increased deep-strike capabilities.

In December 2025, Lance Corporal George Hooley, a member of the Parachute Regiment died in Ukraine during a test of Ukrainian weapons which BBC News reported was said to be an armed interceptor drone. It is the first time a Parachute Regiment member had been confirmed in Ukraine; The i Paper reported he was working for the Special Forces Support Group.

=== Zelenskyy visits to the United Kingdom ===
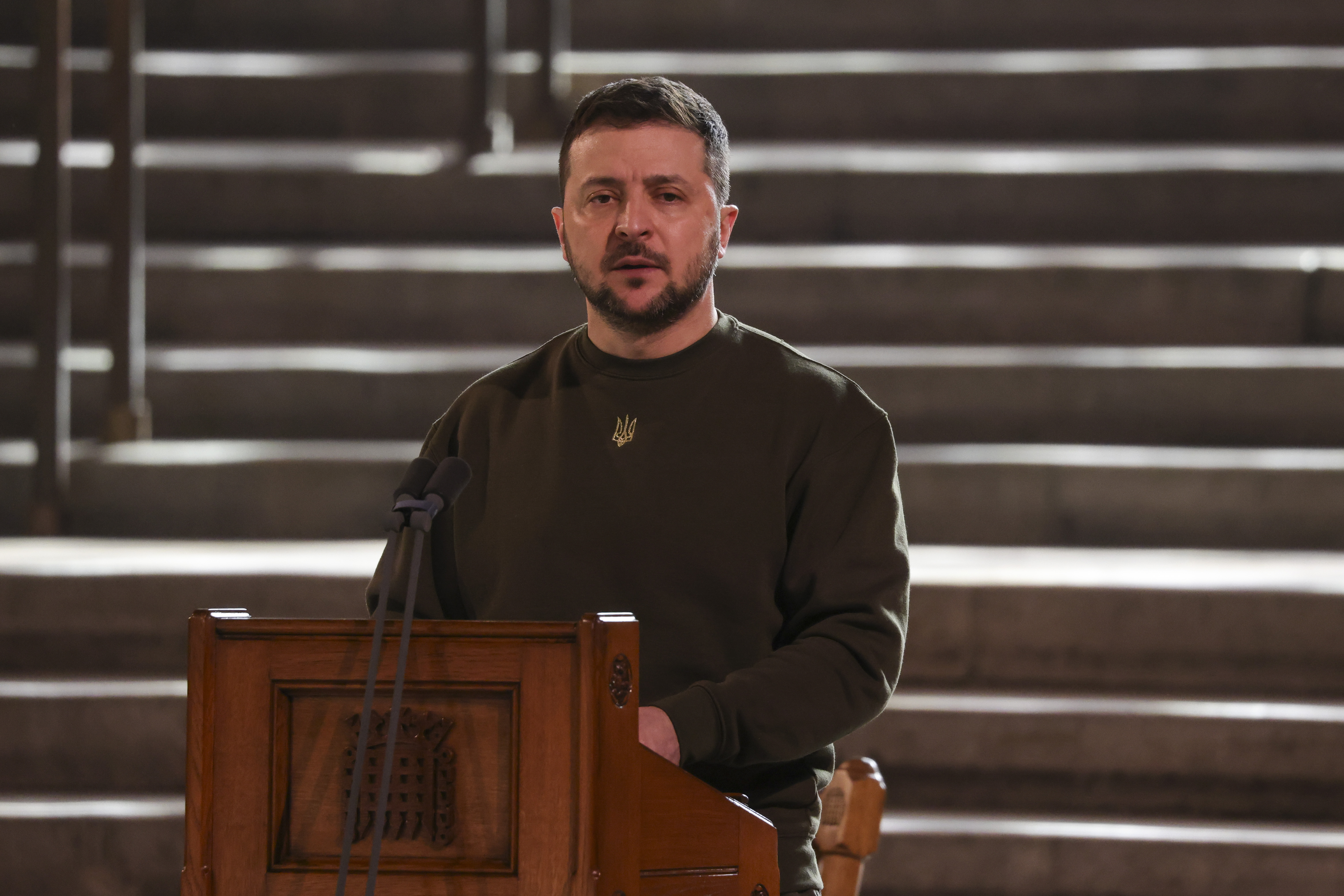
Zelenskyy addressing Members of Parliament from Westminster Hall in the Houses of Parliament

On 8 February 2023, Zelenskyy visited the United Kingdom. During his trip, Zelenskyy met Sunak. He also addressed Members of Parliament from Westminster Hall in the Houses of Parliament and had an audience with King Charles III. It was Zelenskyy's second trip outside Ukraine since the beginning of the Russian invasion of Ukraine, after his December 2022 visit to the United States.

On 15 May 2023, Zelenskyy arrived at Chequers in the United Kingdom and met with Sunak. The first world leader Sunak hosted at Chequers, the two embraced in the garden before holding two-hour-long talks inside. The two discussed fighter jet shipments, while Sunak promised more unmanned aerial drones and air defense missiles, including Storm Shadow cruise missiles.

== Aid to Ukraine ==
As of December 2025, the UK Government had committed £21.8 billion of support for Ukraine, £13 billion in military support, up to £5.3 billion in non-military support, and £3.5 billion of UK Export Finance. In addition it has stated it will sustain £3 billion a year in military aid until 2031, and 229,900 Ukrainian refugees have been supported in the UK. The UK has also made a loan of £2.26 billion to Ukraine as its share of the G7 Extraordinary Revenue Acceleration $50 billion loan. Some UK MOD military equipment has been gifted to Ukraine, which may need to be replenished at additional cost; £2 billion to replenish ammunition stocks and improve the munitions infrastructure was announced in March 2023. The UK National Wealth Fund also invested £113 million in the British-Ukrainian company UForce, which manufactures military drones used extensively in Ukraine.

=== Humanitarian aid to Ukraine ===
- £100 million of humanitarian aid announced on 23 February 2022.
- £40 million additional humanitarian aid announced on 27 February 2022.
- Additional £80 million in aid to help Ukraine deal with humanitarian crisis on 1 March 2022.
- £4 million in humanitarian aid to Ukraine on 28 February 2022.
- In co-operation with Australia the United Kingdom will send hygiene kits, solar lights, kitchen sets and blankets along with other basic necessities to displaced Ukrainians.
- UK announced the donation of a "fleet of ambulances" to Ukraine, on 6 April 2022.
- UK announced the amount it had donated through multilateral donor conferences for humanitarian aid totalled £394m so far on 9 April.
- On 6 May, the British government pledged £45 million to UN and humanitarian groups in and around Ukraine and additional medical supplies.
- As of 20 May, the British government has donated 11.07 million items of medicine and medical equipment to Ukraine.
- 4 July – The UK pledged to donate £10m for repairs to the Ukraine energy grid and for reconnecting homes and to guarantee £41m of European Bank for Reconstruction and Development (EBRD) loans to Ukrenergo, the Ukrainian national grid operator. The UK also committed an undisclosed sum to immediate life-saving assistance and demining operations through the £37m raised by the Partnership Fund for a Resilient Ukraine multi-donor fund. The Partnership Fund for a Resilient Ukraine was launched by the UK in December 2021 with the aim to raise £35m from donors over the next three years for support in the conflict ravaged areas of Ukraine, it is supported by Canada, Sweden, Switzerland, and the United States.
- On 15 July, the British government provided a £2.5 million package for the training of judges and forensic experts and for sending teams to the scenes of alleged Russian war crimes to aid Ukrainian prosecutors.
- On 19 August, the UK pledged £15m of funding to support the basic needs of 200,000 refugees in Ukraine and Poland.
- On 28 September, £300,000 donated to the HALO Trust by the Scottish Government.
- In conjunction with Poland, the United Kingdom support (£10m funding) the building of two villages in Western and central Ukraine for internally displaced civilians (March 2023).
- On 10 June 2023 the British government announced £16 million in humanitarian aid to Ukraine, £10 to the Red Cross movement, £5 million to the United Nations OCHA and £1 to the UN IOM
- 15 June the Welsh Government announced the donation of an airport fire truck to Kharkiv airport.
- 7 July 2023 15 Rapid intervention vehicles and two major foam firefighting vehicles were pledged by the Royal Air Force and the Welsh Government.
- 10 September 2023 the UK Hydrographic Office donated £1.6 million worth of equipment to the State Hydrographic Service of Ukraine.
- Training in protecting critical energy infrastructure provided by army Royal Engineer.
- £14 million grant to the Ukraine Energy Support Fund
- £8.5 million to the Red Cross Movement and the Ukraine Humanitarian Fund.
- Over 100 tonnes of medical supplies and equipment donated by South Central Ambulance Service since the February 2022.
- £2 million worth of medical equipment including ventilators, oxygen concentrators, suction pumps, patient monitors, volumetric pumps and heated humidifiers donated 5 April 2024.
- £20 million for the Ukraine Energy Support Fund announced 8 May 2024.

== See also ==
- United States and the Russo-Ukrainian war

== Sources ==
- Cole, Harry; Heale, James (2022). Out of the Blue: The Inside Story of the Unexpected Rise and Rapid Fall of Liz Truss. HarperCollins. ISBN 978-0-00-860578-0.
- Grierson, Jamie (15 February 2022b). "Russia-Ukraine crisis a 'dangerous moment for the world', warns Truss". The Guardian. Archived from the original on 15 February 2022.
- Payne, Sebastian (2022). The Fall of Boris Johnson: The Full Story. Macmillan Publishers. ISBN 978-1-03-501655-6.
- Philp, Catherine; Parfitt, Tom; Waterfield, Bruno (10 February 2022). "Sergey Lavrov dismisses Liz Truss meeting as 'like talking to a deaf person'". The Times. Archived from the original on 19 February 2022.
- "Ukraine war: Liz Truss says Russia sanctions should end only after withdrawal". BBC News. 27 March 2022. Archived from the original on 27 March 2022.
