= July–September 2022 Conservative Party leadership election =

British leadership election to replace Boris Johnson

- 12 July – 5 September 2022
- Turnout: 82.2% (▼5.2 pp)
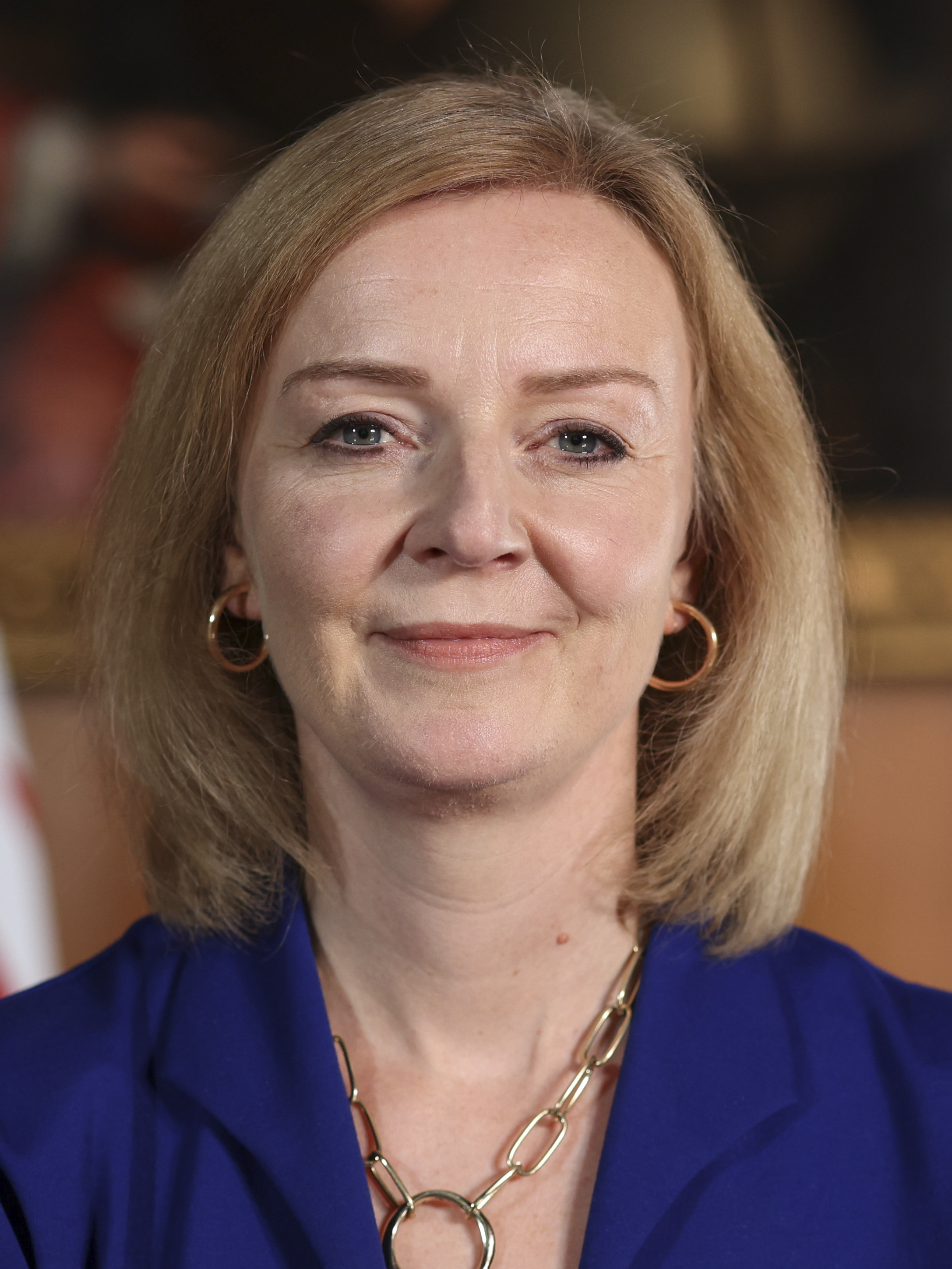

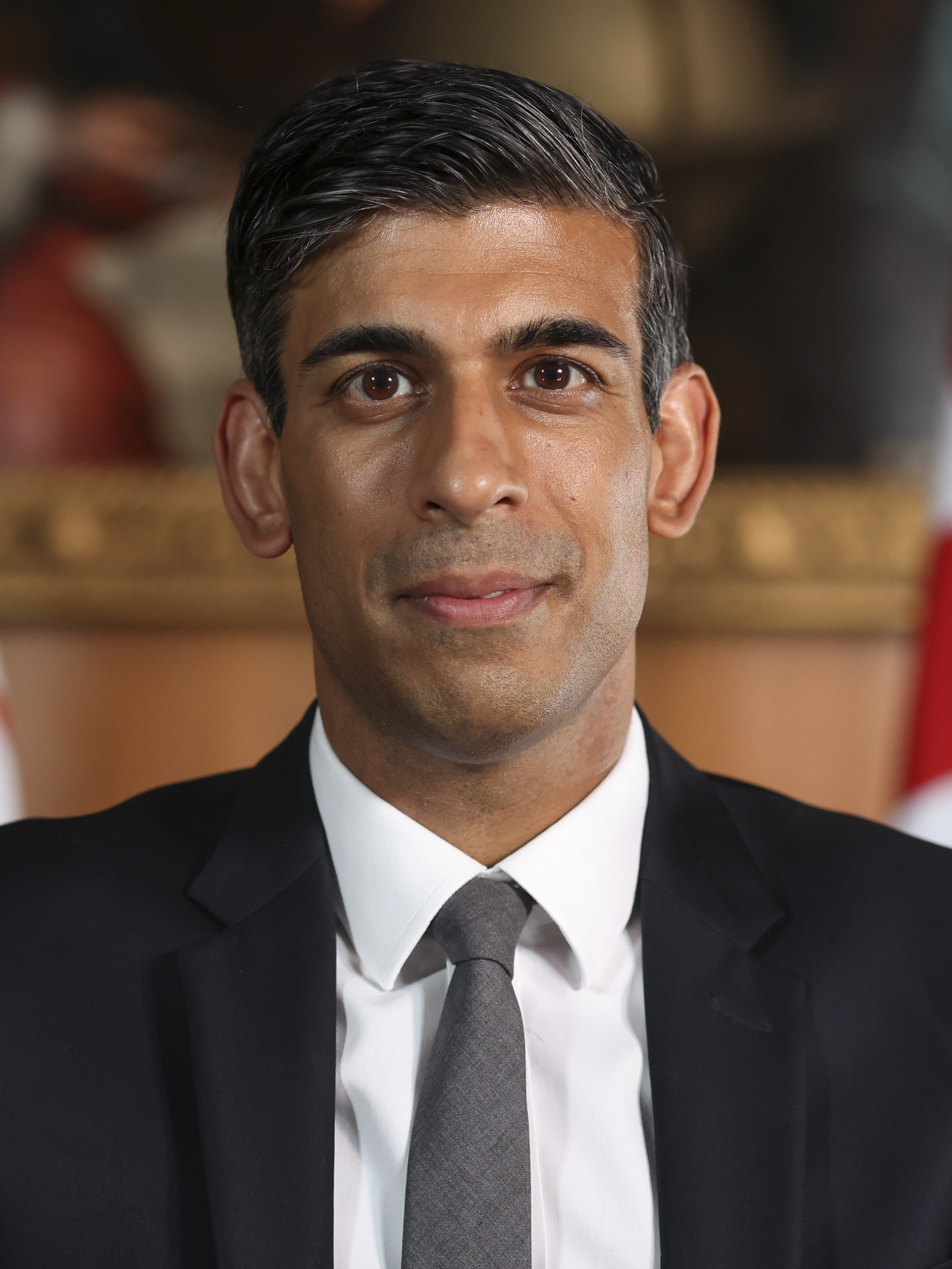
| Candidate | Liz Truss | Rishi Sunak |
| Fifth MPs' ballot | 113 (31.6%) | 137 (38.3%) |
| Members' vote | 81,326 (57.4%) | 60,399 (42.6%) |
Leader before election
Boris Johnson
Elected Leader
Liz Truss

The July–September 2022 Conservative Party leadership election was triggered by Boris Johnson's announcement on 7 July 2022 that he would resign as Leader of the Conservative Party and Prime Minister of the United Kingdom, following a series of political controversies. Liz Truss was elected to replace him.

In the 2019 Conservative Party leadership election, Johnson was elected to succeed Theresa May after she had been unable to secure a majority for her Brexit withdrawal agreement. After having lost his working majority to defections and his own suspensions of rebel Members of Parliament, Johnson called a general election on a platform of completing the UK's withdrawal from the European Union. In that general election, the Conservative Party won their biggest majority in Parliament since 1987, and Johnson was able to pass a revised version of May's withdrawal agreement.

In response to the COVID-19 pandemic in the UK, Johnson and his government had instituted public health restrictions, including limitations on social interaction, that Johnson and some of his staff were later found to have broken. The resulting political scandal (Partygate), one of many in a string of controversies that characterised Johnson's premiership, severely damaged his personal reputation. Johnson won a confidence vote by Conservative MPs in June 2022. The situation escalated with the Chris Pincher scandal in July 2022, and between 5 and 7 July, more than 60 government ministers, parliamentary private secretaries, trade envoys, and party vice-chairmen resigned in what was the largest mass resignation in British history. Many previously supportive MPs called for Johnson to resign. This brought about a government crisis, culminating on 7 July, when Johnson announced that he would resign as party leader. Johnson also announced that he would remain as prime minister until a successor was elected.

Voting took place between 13 July and 2 September. Following a series of MP ballots, the list of candidates was narrowed down to Liz Truss, who served as Foreign Secretary and Minister for Women and Equalities under Johnson's leadership, and Rishi Sunak, who served as Chancellor of the Exchequer until 5 July. On 5 September, Truss was elected to lead the party, and assumed the premiership on 6 September. In her victory speech, Truss thanked Johnson and stated that her new government would cut taxes and deal with the energy crisis. Truss later resigned after just 50 days in office amid an economic and political crisis, which made her the shortest-serving prime minister in British history. Truss was subsequently succeeded by Sunak, after he won the leadership contest to replace her.

== Background ==
=== Brexit and the 2019 leadership election ===
In the aftermath of the 2016 United Kingdom European Union membership referendum, David Cameron resigned the office of prime minister and was succeeded by Theresa May. As prime minister in the aftermath of the referendum, May began to negotiate a withdrawal agreement with the EU. After triggering Article 50, a legal process that started the UK's formal departure from the EU, she called an early general election, aiming to secure a larger Conservative majority to support her proposals for Brexit. However, the result of the election was a hung parliament, with the Conservatives losing their majority. To continue governing, May negotiated a confidence-and-supply agreement with the Democratic Unionist Party (DUP). In December 2018, the Conservative Party triggered a vote of no confidence in May. She told Conservative MPs that she would resign after the UK's withdrawal from the EU, and before the next election. She survived the vote with 200 Conservative MPs voting for confidence and 117 voting for no confidence. The leader of the Labour Party, Jeremy Corbyn, called a vote of no confidence against May in the House of Commons, which she survived by 325 votes to 306. May was unable to pass her Brexit withdrawal agreement through several Parliamentary votes, and announced her resignation in May 2019.

Ten Conservative MPs were nominated in the 2019 leadership election and they were: former Foreign Secretary Johnson, who had served as foreign secretary under May before resigning from her cabinet, foreign secretary Jeremy Hunt, environment secretary Michael Gove, health secretary Matt Hancock, the government chief whip Mark Harper, Home Secretary Sajid Javid, Leader of the House of Commons Andrea Leadsom, work and pensions secretary Esther McVey, Brexit secretary Dominic Raab and Development secretary Rory Stewart. The candidates went through sequential ballots of Conservative MPs until two candidates remained: Hunt and Johnson. Hunt and Johnson went to a vote by Conservative Party members, which saw Johnson elected with 66.4% of the vote to Hunt's 33.6% when the result was announced by the acting chairman of the 1922 committee, Dame Cheryl Gillan, at the Queen Elizabeth II Centre in Westminster on 23 July 2019.

=== 2019 general election ===
As prime minister, Johnson initially had a majority of a single vote. He lost this when the Conservative MP Phillip Lee crossed the floor on 3 September 2019 to join the Liberal Democrats, accusing Johnson's government of "aggressively pursuing a damaging Brexit in unprincipled ways". Twenty-one Conservative MPs voted to allow the House of Commons to consider a bill tabled by the Labour MP Hilary Benn that would require Johnson to seek an extension to date of the UK's withdrawal from the European Union from 31 October 2019 to 31 January 2020 if Parliament had not approved a withdrawal agreement or voted to allow the UK to leave the EU without a deal. Johnson removed the whip from the twenty-one MPs in what The Daily Telegraph described as "one of the biggest parliamentary bloodbaths in history". Shortly afterward Amber Rudd resigned from Johnson's cabinet and left the Conservative Party in protest, and Johnson's brother Jo Johnson resigned as a minister and announced that he would stand down as an MP.

Johnson sought an early general election, but was initially unsuccessful as a majority of MPs wanted to remove the possibility of the UK leaving the EU without a deal. After Benn's bill became law despite Johnson's opposition, he agreed an extension to the UK's withdrawal date and negotiated revisions to the withdrawal agreement. He went on to put forward the Early Parliamentary General Election Act 2019, which passed and resulted in the 2019 general election. The Conservative Party won a majority of eighty, with 365 seats. This was its largest majority since that of Margaret Thatcher in 1987, and the largest share of the vote since Thatcher's 1979 victory. They gained seats in the north of England that had been held by the Labour Party for decades.

=== COVID-19 pandemic and Partygate ===
Less than two months after the 2019 election, cases of COVID-19 (which was declared a pandemic by the World Health Organization in March 2020) had spread to the UK. The BBC wrote "The UK's failure to do more to stop Covid spreading early in the pandemic was one of the country's worst public health failures, a report by MPs says." A legally-enforced lockdown was announced on 23 March, banning all non-essential travel and contact with other people, and shutting schools, businesses, venues and gathering places. People were told to stay at home except for essential purposes and to keep apart in public. Those with symptoms, and their households, were told to self-isolate, while those considered at highest risk were told to shield. In late March, Johnson himself tested positive and was hospitalised with the disease. Johnson's government responded by enacting emergency powers and widespread societal measures including several lockdowns, and approved a vaccination programme that began in December 2020. While reception for Johnson's leadership during the crisis was mixed, the Conservative Party consistently, if narrowly at times, lead in the polls during the pandemic. However, the Conservatives' polling lead began to falter in November 2021 following the emergence of the Owen Paterson scandal, with Johnson backing an effort to overturn a parliamentary suspension that had been recommended after Paterson was judged to have breached rules relating to paid advocacy. While Johnson subsequently described his actions in supporting Paterson as a "total mistake", the incident dropped the Conservative Party to being roughly level with the Labour Party; the Conservatives would thereafter never regain a consistent polling lead for the remainder of Johnson's premiership.

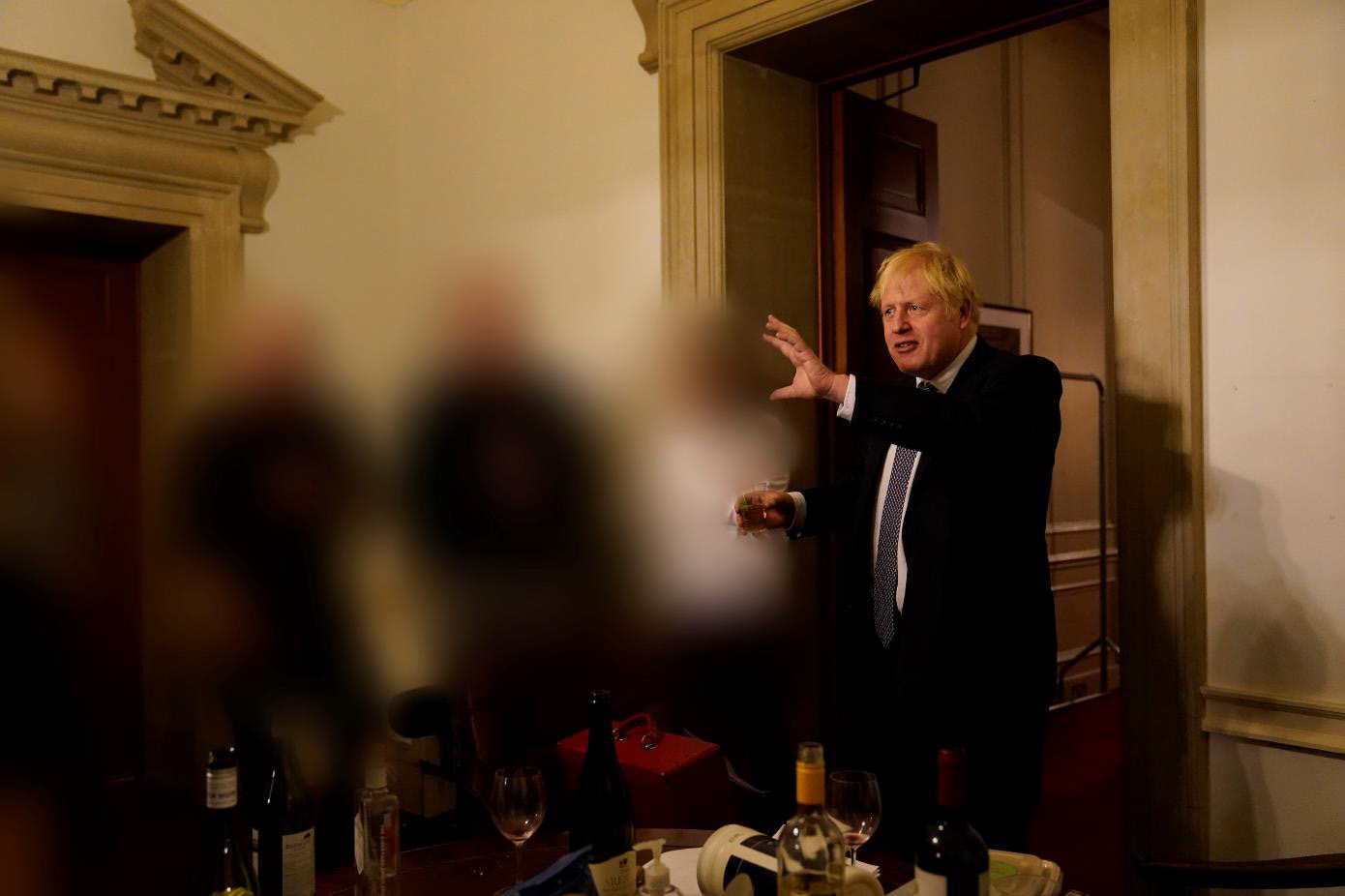
Johnson at one of the 2020 gatherings at which some attendees breached COVID-19 regulations. Reports of these gatherings led to the Partygate scandal, which ultimately played a role in Johnson's resignation as prime minister.

Beginning in December 2021, the media reported that there had been social gatherings by the Conservative Party and UK government staff during public health restrictions due to the COVID-19 pandemic. These included an occasion in which Johnson and the spouse of the prime minister of the United Kingdom Carrie Johnson were pictured with seventeen staff members having cheese and wine in the garden of 10 Downing Street during the first COVID-19 lockdown in the United Kingdom, which the prime minister's official spokesperson later said was a "work meeting". Johnson admitted attending "socially distanced drinks" organised by Martin Reynolds, Johnson's principal private secretary, during the same lockdown. Johnson said he thought it was a "work meeting", while Dominic Cummings, who was an adviser to Johnson at the time, said that he had warned the prime minister against it. There were other events reported involving Johnson and his staff. An inquiry into the allegations was begun by the cabinet secretary Simon Case, but after it was reported that his own office had held a party in December 2020, the inquiry was passed to Sue Gray, another senior civil servant. There was negative reaction against Johnson from Conservative MPs, with some calling for him to resign. Johnson said "nobody said this was something that was against the rules" and that he took "full responsibility for what took place". Johnson, his wife Carrie, and Chancellor of the Exchequer Rishi Sunak all received fixed penalty notices from the police.

Conservative Party rules mean that a confidence vote is triggered by 15% of MPs sending letters to Graham Brady, who chairs the 1922 Committee. There were reports that the threshold would be reached imminently in January 2022. The Guardian reported that several Conservative MPs were waiting until Gray's report into the alleged parties before deciding whether to send letters to Brady. The Conservative MP Christian Wakeford defected to the Labour Party on 19 January 2022, saying that Johnson and the Conservative Party were "incapable of offering the leadership and government this country deserves". The New Statesman reported that some Conservative MPs were delaying sending letters to Brady after Wakeford's defection demonstrated that division in the Conservative Party benefitted Labour. Around the same time, the Conservative MP William Wragg said that his party's whips were using blackmail and threats of withdrawing funding in MPs' constituencies to secure their votes. Another Conservative MP, Nus Ghani, said that a whip had told her that her practice of Islam was discussed when deciding to fire her from her ministerial role in 2020. Wragg and Ghani were vice-chairs of the 1922 Committee, which was said to be considering reducing the period after an unsuccessful vote of no confidence before which a new vote could be triggered from twelve months to six months. The Times reported these as all being serious threats to Johnson being able to remain in his position.

Sunak was thought by some cabinet ministers to be "plotting against" Johnson. The Times reported that his supporters were planning for him to lend votes to another candidate so that the foreign secretary Liz Truss, seen as his main rival, would not reach the final two candidates. On 3 February 2022, when eight MPs had publicly announced that they had submitted letters of no confidence in Johnson, the Financial Times reported that "backbenchers estimate the actual number to be in the region of 30". After the Sue Gray report was published on 25 May, several Tory MPs called for Johnson to resign. By 31 May 17 Conservative MPs had publicly announced they had sent in a letter of no confidence to the 1922 committee. Forty-one Conservative MPs questioning Johnson's position. The Times reported that one rebel believed the true number of letters to be "up to 67", with another backbencher saying 190 MPs could vote against Johnson, enough to remove him.

=== June 2022 confidence vote ===
On 6 June 2022, following the Platinum Jubilee of Elizabeth II, Graham Brady announced that the threshold of 54 letters of no confidence had been met and that a vote of confidence in Johnson would be held in the evening of the same day. A majority of Conservative MPs voted confidence in Johnson to continue as party leader. More than 40% of Conservative MPs voted no confidence, which The Guardian described as "a larger than expected rebellion".

Confidence vote of Boris Johnson
| Ballot → | 6 June 2022 |
| Confidence | 211 / 359 (59%) |
| No confidence | 148 / 359 (41%) |

=== Government crisis ===
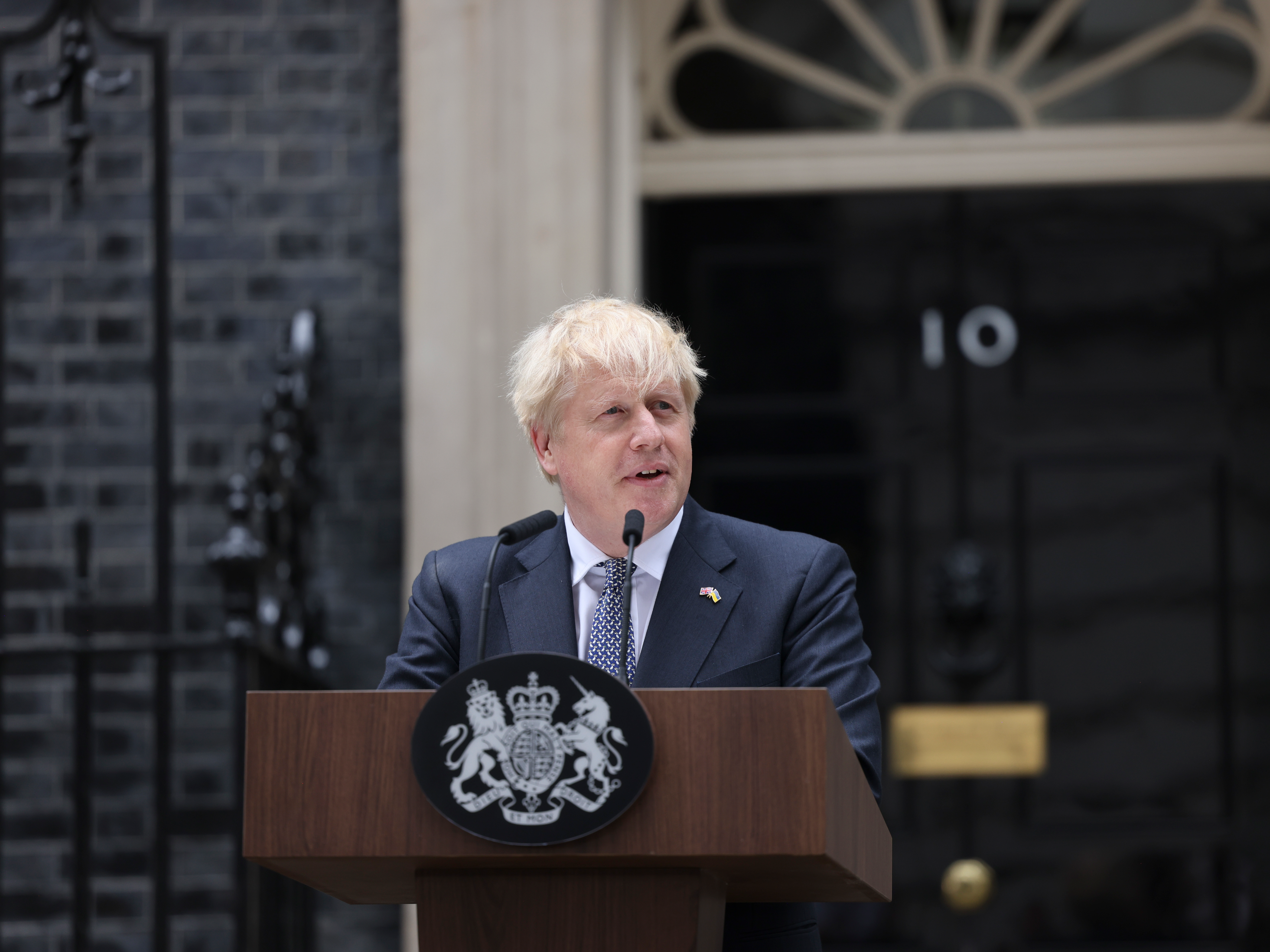
Johnson announces his pending resignation outside 10 Downing Street on 7 July 2022; he left office on 6 September.

In late June 2022, the Conservative MP Chris Pincher resigned as deputy chief government whip after allegations were made that he had groped two men. Johnson initially refused to suspend the whip from him, and his spokesperson defended his initial appointment, saying Johnson had not been aware of allegations against him. More allegations of groping were made against Pincher. The former permanent secretary to the foreign office Simon McDonald wrote that Johnson had been personally briefed on previous allegations against Pincher in 2019. On 4 July, Johnson admitted that he had known about allegations at the time he appointed him. Several ministers resigned on 5 July, including the chancellor of the Exchequer Sunak and the health secretary Javid. Several politicians who had been discussed as potential leadership candidates, including Truss, expressed their continuing support for Johnson. The journalist Tim Shipman wrote in The Times that the transport secretary Grant Shapps, who had kept records of supporters in the earlier confidence vote, told Johnson that he could only guarantee 28 votes of confidence if a new vote were called.

Johnson appointed the prospective leadership candidate Nadhim Zahawi as chancellor, with reports that Zahawi had threatened to resign unless he were given the role. He appointed Michelle Donelan as education secretary, Zahawi's previous role. Many more ministers resigned on 6 July. Several Conservative MPs, including the levelling-up secretary Gove, told Johnson he should resign. Johnson fired Gove the same day, citing disloyalty. The next day, Zahawi and Donelan called for Johnson to resign, with Donelan herself resigning from the cabinet. A poll by YouGov showed that 59% of Conservative Party members wanted Johnson to resign. Johnson announced his pending resignation on the same day, 7 July, saying a new leader would take office before October 2022. He would stay on as prime minister until his successor's election. Several Conservative MPs said he should step down as prime minister, and Keir Starmer, the leader of the Labour Party, said he would call a parliamentary vote of no-confidence in the government if Johnson did not quickly resign as prime minister.

== Election details ==
The process for the 2022 leadership election was approved by the 1922 Committee on 11 July. Nominations opened and closed on 12 July, with each candidate needing to have nominations from at least 20 Conservative MPs to reach the first ballot. Johnson, as the departing leader, was not eligible to run in the ensuing contest.

The first MP ballot was held on 13 July. Under the new rules enacted for the election, candidates would need to have at least 30 votes from MPs to avoid dropping out, eliminating Health and Social Care Select Committee chair Jeremy Hunt and Chancellor of the Exchequer Nadhim Zahawi, who accrued 18 and 25 MP votes respectively. In each subsequent round, beginning with the second on 14 July, the candidate with the fewest votes were to be eliminated. The third ballot took place on Monday 18 July, to eliminate one more candidate, and results were announced at 8 pm. The fourth ballot, reducing the field to three, was held on 19 July, with results presented at 3 pm, and the fifth on 20 July, with the final two names known at 4 pm. Finally, with only two candidates remaining, Conservative Party members were to vote to choose the next party leader on a one-member-one-vote basis, with the candidate receiving the majority of the votes winning.

A series of 12 public hustings were held for a 7-week period between July and August. Voting among Conservative Party members officially closed on 2 September.

On 5 September, it was announced that Liz Truss would become the Conservative leader and thus prime minister the next day. On 13 July, Johnson stated he plans to visit Queen Elizabeth II and resign on Tuesday 6 September, with the new prime minister likely to be appointed by the Queen later the same day. On 31 August, Buckingham Palace announced that the audiences to accept Johnson's resignation and appoint the new prime minister would take place at Balmoral Castle in Aberdeenshire, rather than Buckingham Palace as in the past.

== Campaign ==
On 6 July 2022, more ministers resigned than in any single day in modern history following criticism of the prime minister Boris Johnson's handling of the Chris Pincher scandal. This resulted in Boris Johnson's resignation statement on 7 July 2022 outside 10 Downing Street. Johnson appointed ministers to replace those who had resigned, some of whom were accused of being unsuitable and designed to "sabotage his successor's first weeks in office". A poll of Conservative members by YouGov showed that the defence secretary Ben Wallace was the favourite to win. However, on 9 July, he announced that he would not be running. Wallace had been endorsed by the Conservative MPs Graham Stuart and David Mundell.

Kemi Badenoch, who resigned as local government minister on 6 July, announced her candidacy on 8 July in an article for The Times in which she said she wanted to "tell the truth" and advocated "strong but limited government". She worked as a banker before becoming the MP for Saffron Walden in 2017. Badenoch campaigned for the UK to leave the European Union (EU) during the 2016 membership referendum. The Guardian described her as being on the right wing of the Conservative Party. She called the target of net zero carbon emissions "ill-thought through" and said that politicians had become "hooked on the idea of the state fixing the majority of problems". She was eliminated in the fourth round of voting.

Suella Braverman, the Attorney General for England and Wales, was the first Conservative MP to publicly declare her candidacy, announcing before Johnson resigned. She worked as a barrister before becoming the MP for Fareham in 2015. During an ITV interview with journalist Robert Peston, she called for Johnson to step down as prime minister but said she would not resign from his cabinet because she had a "duty and we need an Attorney in government". Braverman said the task of the next Conservative leader would be to "finish Brexit, deliver tax cuts and solve our energy crisis". After the first flight of the Rwanda asylum plan was stopped by an interim measure from the European Court of Human Rights (ECHR), she said she had "significant reservations about our relationship with the European Court of Human Rights". As a leadership candidate, she said she would leave the ECHR, which she accused of "thwarting our democracy". She was eliminated in the second round of voting and endorsed Liz Truss.

Rehman Chishti, the MP for Gillingham and Rainham, announced he was running on 10 July, saying he offered a "fresh start" and advocating "aspirational conservatism". He said lower taxes were important. He ended his campaign on 12 July, endorsing Tom Tugendhat, and then Rishi Sunak.

Jeremy Hunt announced his candidacy in The Sunday Telegraph on 10 July. Before he entered politics, he taught English in Japan, worked in public relations and founded a publishing business. He became the MP for South West Surrey in 2005 and supported the UK remaining in the EU during the 2016 membership referendum. Hunt had not served as a minister in Johnson's government, but had previously served as Foreign Secretary under May and as health secretary for several years under David Cameron and May. He criticised Johnson for investing in infrastructure instead of "wealth creation", and proposed policies including a moratorium on business rates in deprived areas and a cut to corporation tax to 15% instead of a proposed rise to 25%. He said he would maintain the rise in National Insurance rates and would not cut personal taxation until he "[got] the economy growing". He pledged to legalise fox hunting and to maintain the government policy of sending refugees to Rwanda, saying he hoped to expand the programme to other countries. Hunt said he would appoint the MP Esther McVey as his deputy prime minister for "broad appeal". He was eliminated in the first round of voting and endorsed Rishi Sunak.

Sajid Javid, who resigned as health secretary on 5 July saying it had become impossible to walk "the tightrope between loyalty and integrity", announced in The Sunday Telegraph on 10 July that he was running in the election. After his resignation, allies of Johnson said that Javid had argued for stronger pandemic restrictions to be applied around Christmas 2021 as well as a policy to require staff at large companies to either be vaccinated or to wear masks and get COVID-19 tests weekly. Javid said he would reverse the rise in National Insurance, temporarily cut fuel duty and cut corporation tax over the course of four years from 19% to 15% instead of a proposed rise to 25% funded by an "efficiency savings programme that would see 1% cut from all Whitehall spending, including on the NHS". He said he would continue the government policy of sending asylum seekers to Rwanda. Javid committed to keep the UK's net zero target and keeping the BBC licence fee. Before becoming an MP, Javid worked as an investment banker, during which time he had non-domiciled tax status. He was elected as the MP for Bromsgrove in 2010 and supported the UK remaining in the EU during the 2016 membership referendum. He ended his campaign on 12 July, endorsing Liz Truss.

Penny Mordaunt, the international trade minister, announced she was running on 10 July on social media. The video included footage of Oscar Pistorius, an athlete who was convicted of murder, and the British Paralympian Jonnie Peacock, who requested to be removed. A new version of the video was published with clips of Pistorius and Peacock removed. She worked in public relations before becoming the MP for Portsmouth North in 2010. The Telegraph described her as a "socially liberal Brexiteer". Several Conservative activists criticised her pro-transgender stance, including saying that trans women are women and that trans men are men. Along with Tugendhat, Mordaunt was seen as a candidate who could appeal to Scottish Conservative MPs. She was eliminated in the fifth round of voting and endorsed Liz Truss.

Grant Shapps, the transport secretary, announced his candidacy on 8 July in an article for The Times, emphasising that he had been loyal to Johnson and had not been preparing a leadership campaign "behind his back". He argued against the "unnecessary continuation" of spending and restrictions introduced due to the COVID-19 pandemic and proposed a policy platform including tax cuts and "state support to firms with high levels of energy consumption". He gave a target of the UK having the largest economy in Europe by 2050 by becoming a "low-tax, low-regulation economy", citing Singapore as a country to learn from. He also said he would raise defence spending from 2.3% to 3.0% of GDP and that the UK would need to prepare for "high-intensity warfare". Before becoming an MP, Shapps operated web marketing businesses, sometimes using pseudonyms. He became the MP for Welwyn Hatfield in 2005 and supported the UK remaining in the EU during the 2016 membership referendum. He said he would not argue about transgender people's rights, saying that gender transition was people's "choice and they will always have my support for me", describing himself as a libertarian. He ended his campaign on 12 July, endorsing Rishi Sunak.

Rishi Sunak, who resigned as chancellor on 5 July saying government should be "conducted properly, competently and seriously", announced he was running in a video posted to social media on 8 July, writing that he would "restore trust, rebuild the economy and reunite the country". He said that his values were "patriotism, fairness, hard work", and pledged to "crack down on gender neutral language". During the campaign, Sunak pledged to included tax cuts only when inflation was under control, scrapping of the 5% VAT rate on household energy for one year, introducing a temporary £10 fine for patients who fail to attend GP appointments, capping of refugee numbers, and a tightening of the definition of asylum.

Liz Truss, the foreign secretary, announced her candidacy in The Daily Telegraph on 10 July. Before becoming an MP, she worked as an accountant. She was elected as the MP for South West Norfolk in 2010 and supported the UK remaining in the EU during the 2016 membership referendum. She said she would cancel a planned rise in corporation tax and reverse the recent increase in National Insurance rates, funded by delaying the date by which the national debt is planned to fall, as part of a "long-term plan to bring down the size of the state and the tax burden". Her team said she was influenced by the former president of the United States Ronald Reagan and the former chancellor of the Exchequer Nigel Lawson.

Tom Tugendhat, the chair of the Foreign Affairs Select Committee, announced his candidacy in The Daily Telegraph on 7 July, highlighting his previous experience in the British Army. He said he would reverse the recent increase in National Insurance rates and cut fuel duty. Several Scottish Conservative MPs supported him, and he wrote in his leadership announcement that he would "stand up for the Union and Scotland's role within it". Before entering politics, Tugendhat had served as an intelligence officer in the Iraq War and the Afghanistan conflict. He became the MP for Tonbridge and Malling in 2015 and supported the UK remaining in the EU during the 2016 membership referendum. He was critical of Johnson, particularly over the fall of Kabul, and did not serve as a minister in his government. He said that lack of ministerial experience was not a problem as the role of prime minister was "not a management job, it's about having a vision". The Independent described him as "something of a hawk". He was seen as competing with a potential candidacy from the former foreign secretary Hunt for the support of the moderate One Nation Conservatives faction. Tugendhat pledged to maintain the government's policy of deporting asylum seekers to Rwanda. He said he admired Reagan as his "political hero". He was eliminated in the third round of voting and endorsed Liz Truss.

Nadhim Zahawi, whom Johnson had appointed as chancellor of the Exchequer after Sunak resigned on 5 July, was reported to have been working on a leadership campaign with the support of the political strategist Lynton Crosby and his allies, and to have accepted the role of chancellor instead of resigning to "as a way to get his message across" on cutting taxes. He announced his candidacy on 9 July. Before entering politics, he co-founded the polling firm YouGov and worked in the oil industry. He became the MP for Stratford-on-Avon in 2010 and supported the UK leaving the EU in the 2016 membership referendum. He said he would increase defence spending, as well as "protecting [children] from damaging and inappropriate nonsense being forced on them by radical activists". He announced he was considering cutting corporation tax, income tax and National Insurance, funded by 20% cuts to every government department. On 9 July, The Independent reported that HM Revenue and Customs were investigating his tax affairs, after the case had been transferred to them from the National Crime Agency's International Corruption Unit. Zahawi's spokesperson denied any wrongdoing and said he was "not aware of any formal investigation". Zahawi said he was "being smeared" and promised to publish his accounts annually if he became prime minister, but said releasing his previous accounts would not be "right". He was eliminated in the first round of voting and endorsed Liz Truss.

Stephen Bush, writing in the Financial Times on 11 July, described two lanes in the leadership context. There is an establishment lane, where Sunak has led ahead of candidates including Hunt, Javid, Shapps or Tugendhat. There is then a right-wing lane, where Truss has led ahead of candidates including Badenoch, Braverman, Zahawi or Patel. He characterised Mordaunt as between the two sides. Tara John of CNN noted several candidates going to lengths to display their anti-transgender positions, despite polling indicating that it is not a particularly important issue to the British public. Stonewall CEO Nancy Kelley called this "disproportionate and scary".

== Candidates ==
=== Nominated ===
Eight candidates were confirmed on 12 July, having gained the support of at least 20 other Conservative MPs:

| Candidate | Political office and constituency | Campaign | Date declared | Campaign progression | Proposer/ seconder | Ref. |
|---|---|---|---|---|---|---|
| Kemi Badenoch | Minister of State for Local Government, Faith and Communities (2021–2022); MP for Saffron Walden (2017–2024) | Website | 8 July 2022 | Eliminated after fourth ballot | Lee Rowley; Julia Lopez | |
| Suella Braverman | Attorney General for England and Wales (2020–2022); MP for Fareham (2015–2024) | Website | 6 July 2022 | Eliminated after second ballot; endorsed Liz Truss | David Jones; Miriam Cates | |
| Jeremy Hunt | Chair of the Health and Social Care Select Committee (2020–2022); MP for South West Surrey (2005–2024) | Website | 9 July 2022 | Eliminated after first ballot; endorsed Rishi Sunak | Esther McVey; Anthony Mangnall | |
| Penny Mordaunt | Minister of State for Trade Policy (2021–2022); MP for Portsmouth North (2010–2024) | Website | 10 July 2022 | Eliminated after fifth ballot; endorsed Liz Truss | Andrea Leadsom; Craig Tracey | |
| Rishi Sunak | Chancellor of the Exchequer (2020–2022); MP for Richmond (Yorks) (2015–2024) | Website | 8 July 2022 | Defeated at the Members' vote | Dominic Raab; Mel Stride | |
| Liz Truss | Foreign Secretary (2021–2022); MP for South West Norfolk (2010–2024) | Website | 10 July 2022 | Won at the Members' vote, becoming party leader and thus Prime Minister | Simon Clarke; Thérèse Coffey | |
| Tom Tugendhat | Chair of the Foreign Affairs Select Committee (2017–2022); MP for Tonbridge and Malling (2015–2024) | Website | 7 July 2022 | Eliminated after third ballot; endorsed Liz Truss | Anne-Marie Trevelyan; James Daly | |
| Nadhim Zahawi | Chancellor of the Exchequer (2022); MP for Stratford-on-Avon (2010–2024) | NZ4PM | 9 July 2022 | Eliminated after first ballot; endorsed Liz Truss | Brandon Lewis; Amanda Milling | |

=== Withdrew ===
The following MPs announced that they would seek the leadership of the Conservative Party but subsequently withdrew from the race before they could be nominated:

| Candidate | Political office and constituency | Campaign | Declared | Withdrew | Endorsed | Ref. |
|---|---|---|---|---|---|---|
| Rehman Chishti | Parliamentary Under-Secretary of State for North America, Sanctions and Consular Policy (2022); MP for Gillingham and Rainham (2010–2024) | | 10 July 2022 | 12 July 2022 | Tom Tugendhat, then Rishi Sunak | |
| Sajid Javid | Secretary of State for Health and Social Care (2021–2022); MP for Bromsgrove (2010–2024) | Website | 9 July 2022 | 12 July 2022 | Liz Truss | |
| Grant Shapps | Secretary of State for Transport (2019–2022); MP for Welwyn Hatfield (2005–2024) | Grant Shapps | 9 July 2022 | 12 July 2022 | Rishi Sunak | |

=== Publicly expressed interest ===
The following Conservative Party politicians publicly expressed interest in running for the leadership but did not stand:

- Steve Baker, MP for Wycombe (endorsed Braverman then Truss)
- John Baron, MP for Basildon and Billericay (endorsed Mordaunt then Sunak)
- Jake Berry, MP for Rossendale and Darwen (endorsed Tugendhat then Truss)
- Robert Buckland, MP for South Swindon and Secretary of State for Wales (endorsed Sunak then Truss)
- Nadine Dorries, MP for Mid Bedfordshire and Secretary of State for Digital, Culture, Media and Sport (endorsed Truss)
- Priti Patel, MP for Witham and Home Secretary
- Jacob Rees-Mogg, MP for North East Somerset and Minister of State for Brexit Opportunities and Government Efficiency (endorsed Truss)
- Bill Wiggin, MP for North Herefordshire (endorsed Badenoch)

=== Declined ===
The following Conservative Party politicians have been speculated as potential candidates for the leadership but declined to stand:

- David Davis, MP for Haltemprice and Howden (endorsed Mordaunt then Sunak)
- Simon Clarke, MP for Middlesbrough South and East Cleveland and Chief Secretary to the Treasury (endorsed Truss)
- James Cleverly, MP for Braintree and Secretary of State for Education (endorsed Truss)
- Tobias Ellwood, MP for Bournemouth East (endorsed Zahawi then Mordaunt)
- Michael Gove, MP for Surrey Heath (endorsed Badenoch then Sunak)
- Matt Hancock, MP for West Suffolk (endorsed Sunak)
- Mark Harper, MP for Forest of Dean (endorsed Sunak)
- Gillian Keegan, MP for Chichester and Minister of State for Care and Mental Health (endorsed Sunak)
- Kwasi Kwarteng, MP for Spelthorne and Secretary of State for Business, Energy and Industrial Strategy (endorsed Truss)
- Esther McVey, MP for Tatton (endorsed Hunt, running mate)
- Dominic Raab, MP for Esher and Walton, Secretary of State for Justice, Lord Chancellor, and Deputy Prime Minister (endorsed Sunak)
- Alexander Stafford, MP for Rother Valley (endorsed Truss)
- Ben Wallace, MP for Wyre and Preston North and Secretary of State for Defence (endorsed Truss)

== Timeline ==
Candidate status
| Candidate on membership ballot |
| Candidate eliminated during MP ballots |
| Candidate withdrew |
Events
| Boris Johnson announces resignation |
| Nominations close |
| MP ballots |
| First televised head-to-head debate |
| Postal ballots distributed to party members |
| Final leadership hustings |
| Results announced |

== Debates ==
| No. | Date and time | Location | Programme | Broadcaster | Presenter(s) | Viewers (millions) | Candidates | | | | | Ref. |
| P Participant O Out of race (eliminated or withdrawn) H Debate halted N No debate | | | | | | | Badenoch | Mordaunt | Sunak | Truss | Tugendhat | Ref. |
|---|---|---|---|---|---|---|---|---|---|---|---|---|
Prior to the final ballot of Conservative MPs
| 1 | 15 July 2022, 7:30 pm | Here East, Stratford, London | Britain's Next PM: The; Conservative Debate | Channel 4 | Krishnan Guru-Murthy | 1.85 | P | P | P | P | P | |
| 2 | 17 July 2022, 7pm | Riverside Studios, Hammersmith, London | Britain's Next Prime; Minister: The ITV Debate | ITV | Julie Etchingham | 3.06 | P | P | P | P | P | |
| 3 | 19 July 2022, 8pm (cancelled) | ~~Sky Campus, Isleworth,~~; ~~London~~ | ~~The Battle for No. 10~~ | ~~Sky News~~ | ~~Kay Burley~~ | N/A | O | N | N | N | O | |
Following the final ballot of Conservative MPs
| 4 | 25 July 2022, 9pm | Victoria Hall, Stoke-on-Trent | Our Next Prime Minister | BBC One | Sophie Raworth | 3.70 | O | O | P | P | O | |
| 5 | 26 July 2022, 6pm (Note: After the host Kate McCann fell ill, the debate was halted approximately halfway through the planned one-hour runtime and was not resumed.) | Ealing Broadcast Centre, Ealing, London | The Sun's Showdown: The Fight for No.10 | The Sun and TalkTV | ~~Harry Cole~~ (withdrew); Kate McCann | 0.14 | O | O | H | H | O | |

=== Public reaction ===
| Date(s) administered | Poll source | Sample size | Badenoch | Mordaunt | Sunak | Truss | Tugendhat | Don't Know |
|---|---|---|---|---|---|---|---|---|
Britain's Next PM: The Conservative Debate
| 15 July 2022 | Opinium | 1,159 | 12% | 12% | 25% | 6% | 36% | 9% |
Britain's Next Prime Minister: The ITV Debate
| 17 July 2022 | Opinium | 1,001 | 12% | 17% | 24% | 15% | 19% | 13% |
Our Next Prime Minister
| 25 July 2022 | Opinium | 1,032 | – | – | 39% | 38% | – | 23% |

== Public hustings ==
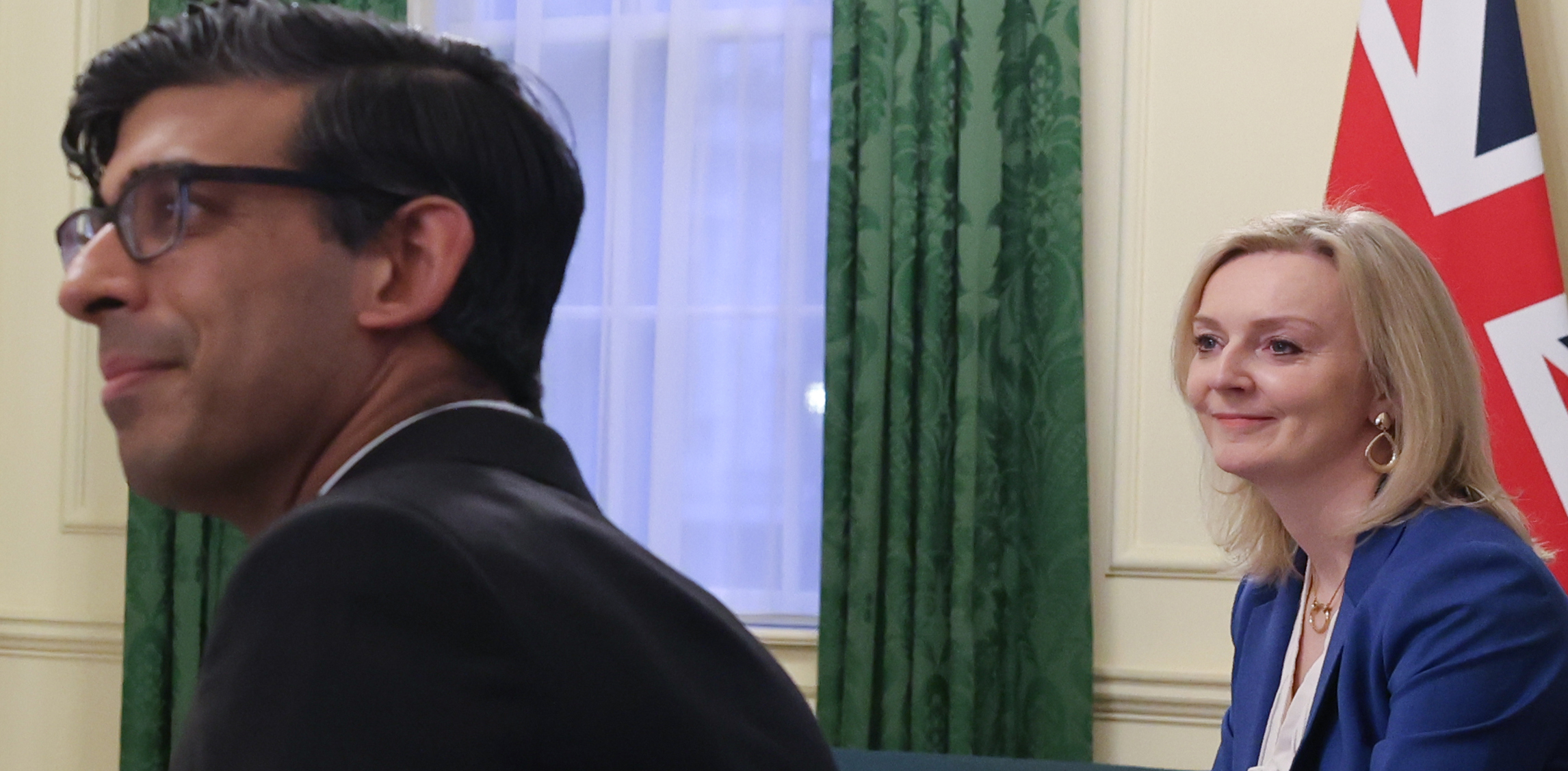
Rishi Sunak and Liz Truss, the final two candidates

Following the fifth ballot of Conservative MPs on 20 July, the final two candidates, Rishi Sunak and Liz Truss, were invited to take place in a series of hustings organised by the party. Each of the twelve events were held in a different nation or region of the UK, except for one extra in South West England and none in the East Midlands.

| Date | Moderator | Nation or Region | Venue | Map |
|---|---|---|---|---|
| 28 July 2022 | Nick Ferrari | Yorkshire and the Humber | Elland Road, Leeds, West Yorkshire | July–September 2022 Conservative Party leadership election is located in the United Kingdom |
| 1 August 2022 | Sebastian Payne | South West England | University of Exeter, Exeter, Devon | July–September 2022 Conservative Party leadership election is located in the United Kingdom |
| 3 August 2022 | Hannah Vaughan Jones | Wales | All Nations Centre, Cardiff, Wales | July–September 2022 Conservative Party leadership election is located in the United Kingdom |
| 5 August 2022 | Jimmy McLoughlin | South East England | Winter Garden Theatre, Eastbourne, East Sussex | July–September 2022 Conservative Party leadership election is located in the United Kingdom |
| 9 August 2022 | Tom Newton Dunn | North East England | The Hippodrome, Darlington, County Durham | July–September 2022 Conservative Party leadership election is located in the United Kingdom |
| 11 August 2022 | Camilla Tominey | South West England | Cheltenham Racecourse, Cheltenham, Gloucestershire | July–September 2022 Conservative Party leadership election is located in the United Kingdom |
| 16 August 2022 | Colin Mackay | Scotland | Perth Concert Hall, Perth, Perthshire | July–September 2022 Conservative Party leadership election is located in the United Kingdom |
| 17 August 2022 | Andrew Stephenson MP | Northern Ireland | Culloden Estate, Belfast, County Antrim | July–September 2022 Conservative Party leadership election is located in the United Kingdom |
| 19 August 2022 | Alastair Stewart | North West England | Manchester Central Convention Complex, Manchester, Greater Manchester | July–September 2022 Conservative Party leadership election is located in the United Kingdom |
| 23 August 2022 | John Pienaar | West Midlands | National Exhibition Centre, Birmingham, West Midlands | July–September 2022 Conservative Party leadership election is located in the United Kingdom |
| 25 August 2022 | Julia Hartley-Brewer | East of England | Holiday Inn Hotel, Norwich, Norfolk | July–September 2022 Conservative Party leadership election is located in the United Kingdom |
| 31 August 2022 | Nick Ferrari | Greater London | Wembley Arena, London, Greater London | July–September 2022 Conservative Party leadership election is located in the United Kingdom |

== Opinion polling ==
=== Sunak vs. Truss ===
| Dates conducted | Pollster | Sample size | Rishi Sunak | Liz Truss | Will not vote | Don't know |
|---|---|---|---|---|---|---|
| 18–25 Aug | techneUK | 801 Conservative Party members | 33% | 59% | 8% | |
| 18–25 Aug | techneUK | 801 Conservative Party members | 36% | 64% | N/A | |
| 12–17 Aug | YouGov | 950 Conservative Party members | 34% | 66% | N/A | |
| 16–17 Aug | Conservative Home (Note: The ConservativeHome Party Members' Survey is a self-selecting panel, not a demographically or geographically weighted poll. The panel is composed of over 3,300 members of the Conservative Party, who receive the survey by email.) | 961 Conservative Party members | 28% | 60% | 3% | 9% |
| 8–13 Aug | Opinium | 570 Conservative Party members | 39% | 61% | N/A | |
| 12 Aug | techneUK | 272 Conservative Party members | 33% | 60% | N/A | 7% |
| 5 Aug | techneUK | 261 Conservative Party members | 36% | 56% | N/A | 8% |
| 3–4 Aug | Conservative Home | 1,003 Conservative Party members | 26% | 58% | 1% | 12% |
| 29 Jul – 2 Aug | YouGov | 1,043 Conservative Party members | 31% | 69% | N/A | |
| 29 Jul – 2 Aug | YouGov | 1,043 Conservative Party members | 26% | 60% | 2% | 11% |
| 27–29 Jul | techneUK | 807 Conservative Party members | 43% | 48% | 9% | |
| 20–21 Jul | YouGov | 730 Conservative Party members | 38% | 62% | N/A | |
| 20–21 Jul | YouGov | 730 Conservative Party members | 31% | 49% | 6% | 15% |
| 18–19 Jul | Conservative Home | 845 Conservative Party members | 42% | 49% | N/A | 9% |
| 18–19 Jul | YouGov | 725 Conservative Party members | 35% | 54% | N/A | 10% |
| 12–13 Jul | YouGov | 879 Conservative Party members | 35% | 59% | N/A | 6% |
| 11–12 Jul | Conservative Home | 929 Conservative Party members | 34% | 51% | N/A | 14% |
| 6–8 Jul | Opinium | 493 Conservative Party members | 37% | 33% | 8% | 22% |
| 6–7 Jul | YouGov | 716 Conservative Party members | 38% | 43% | N/A | 19% |

=== Sunak vs. Truss vs. Johnson ===
| Dates conducted | Pollster | Sample size | Boris Johnson | Rishi Sunak | Liz Truss | Don't know |
|---|---|---|---|---|---|---|
| 12–17 Aug | YouGov | 950 Conservative Party members | 46% | 23% | 24% | 7% |
| 29 Jul–2 Aug | YouGov | 1,043 Conservative Party members | 40% | 23% | 28% | 9% |
| 25 Jul | Deltapoll | 1,588 Conservative Party voters | 40% | 29% | 24% | 7% |

=== Party members ===
Preferred leader

| Dates conducted | Pollster | Client | Sample size | Kemi Badenoch | Suella Braverman | Jeremy Hunt | Sajid Javid | Penny Mordaunt | Rishi Sunak | Liz Truss | Tom Tugendhat | Ben Wallace | Nadhim Zahawi | Others |
|---|---|---|---|---|---|---|---|---|---|---|---|---|---|---|
| 20–21 Jul 2022 | YouGov | N/A | 730 | 24% | 3% | 4% | – | 20% | 11% | 13% | 9% | – | 2% | 13% |
| 16 July 2022 | ConservativeHome | N/A | 851 | 31% | – | – | – | 18% | 17% | 20% | 10% | – | – | 3% |
| 13–14 Jul 2022 | techneUK | N/A | 238 | 9% | – | – | – | 23% | 34% | 21% | 5% | – | – | 8% |
| 12–13 Jul 2022 | YouGov | N/A | 879 | 15% | 5% | 4% | – | 27% | 13% | 13% | 8% | – | 1% | 14% Don't know on 8% None of the above on 6% |
| 12 July 2022 | techneUK | N/A | 248 | 4% | 2% | 15% | – | 15% | 29% | 19% | 4% | – | 4% | 10% |
| 12 July 2022 | ConservativeHome | N/A | 842 | 19% | 11% | 4% | 3% | 20% | 12% | 11% | 7% | – | 4% | 10% Other on 6% Grant Shapps on 2% Priti Patel on 2% |
| 6–9 Jul 2022 | Opinium | N/A | 493 | – | – | 9% | 10% | 10% | 25% | 21% | – | 12% | 6% | 59% Dominic Raab on 12% Michael Gove on 8% Priti Patel on 8% Someone else on 9% Don't know on 24% None of the above on 0% |
| 6–7 Jul 2022 | YouGov | N/A | 716 | – | – | 5% | 4% | 12% | 10% | 8% | 6% | 13% | 5% | 39% Don't know on 12% None of the above on 9% Michael Gove on 7% Dominic Raab on 7% Priti Patel on 3% Steven Barclay on 1% |
| 3 July 2022 | ConservativeHome | N/A | 755 | 6% | – | 6% | 3% | 16% | 5% | 14% | 7% | 16% | 7% | 21% Steve Baker on 6% Dominic Raab on 5% Michael Gove on 4% Priti Patel on 2% Sir Graham Brady on 2% Mark Harper on 1% |

Head-to-head

YouGov have asked Conservative Party members which candidate they would vote for under various head-to-head scenarios.

| Dates conducted | Pollster | Client | Sample size | Kemi Badenoch | Suella Braverman | Jeremy Hunt | Penny Mordaunt | Rishi Sunak | Liz Truss | Tom Tugendhat | Ben Wallace | Nadhim Zahawi | Don't know |
|---|---|---|---|---|---|---|---|---|---|---|---|---|---|
| 18–19 Jul 2022 | YouGov | N/A | 725 | 48% | – | – | 43% | – | – | – | – | – | 9% |
| 18–19 Jul 2022 | YouGov | N/A | 725 | 56% | – | – | – | 34% | – | – | – | – | 10% |
| 18–19 Jul 2022 | YouGov | N/A | 725 | 46% | – | – | – | – | 43% | – | – | – | 11% |
| 18–19 Jul 2022 | YouGov | N/A | 725 | – | – | – | 51% | 37% | – | – | – | – | 12% |
| 18–19 Jul 2022 | YouGov | N/A | 725 | – | – | – | 42% | – | 48% | – | – | – | 10% |
| 18–19 Jul 2022 | YouGov | N/A | 725 | – | – | – | – | 35% | 54% | – | – | – | 10% |
| 12–13 Jul 2022 | YouGov | N/A | 879 (Note: The head-to-heads which included Zahawi, Braverman or Hunt were shown to a random half of the sample.) | 30% | – | – | 59% | – | – | – | – | – | 10% |
| 12–13 Jul 2022 | YouGov | N/A | 879 | 49% | – | – | – | 40% | – | – | – | – | 11% |
| 12–13 Jul 2022 | YouGov | N/A | 879 | 37% | – | – | – | – | 54% | – | – | – | 10% |
| 12–13 Jul 2022 | YouGov | N/A | 879 | 44% | – | – | – | – | – | 42% | – | – | 14% |
| 12–13 Jul 2022 | YouGov | N/A | 879 | – | 25% | – | 63% | – | – | – | – | – | 12% |
| 12–13 Jul 2022 | YouGov | N/A | 879 | – | 42% | – | – | 45% | – | – | – | – | 13% |
| 12–13 Jul 2022 | YouGov | N/A | 879 | – | – | 16% | 77% | – | – | – | – | – | 13% |
| 12–13 Jul 2022 | YouGov | N/A | 879 | – | – | 25% | – | 57% | – | – | – | – | 18% |
| 12–13 Jul 2022 | YouGov | N/A | 879 | – | – | – | 67% | 28% | – | – | – | – | 6% |
| 12–13 Jul 2022 | YouGov | N/A | 879 | – | – | – | 55% | – | 37% | – | – | – | 9% |
| 12–13 Jul 2022 | YouGov | N/A | 879 | – | – | – | 64% | – | – | 26% | – | – | 10% |
| 12–13 Jul 2022 | YouGov | N/A | 879 | – | – | – | 70% | – | – | – | – | 18% | 12% |
| 12–13 Jul 2022 | YouGov | N/A | 879 | – | – | – | – | 35% | 59% | – | – | – | 6% |
| 12–13 Jul 2022 | YouGov | N/A | 879 | – | – | – | – | 39% | – | 48% | – | – | 12% |
| 12–13 Jul 2022 | YouGov | N/A | 879 | – | – | – | – | 41% | – | – | – | 41% | 18% |
| 12–13 Jul 2022 | YouGov | N/A | 879 | – | – | – | – | – | 57% | 36% | – | – | 7% |
| 6–7 Jul 2022 | YouGov | N/A | 716 | – | – | 23% | 53% | – | – | – | – | – | 24% |
| 6–7 Jul 2022 | YouGov | N/A | 716 | – | – | 18% | – | 56% | – | – | – | – | 25% |
| 6–7 Jul 2022 | YouGov | N/A | 716 | – | – | 25% | – | – | 55% | – | – | – | 20% |
| 6–7 Jul 2022 | YouGov | N/A | 716 | – | – | 22% | – | – | – | – | 58% | – | 20% |
| 6–7 Jul 2022 | YouGov | N/A | 716 | – | – | – | 40% | 38% | – | – | – | – | 22% |
| 6–7 Jul 2022 | YouGov | N/A | 716 | – | – | – | 34% | – | 40% | – | – | – | 26% |
| 6–7 Jul 2022 | YouGov | N/A | 716 | – | – | – | 26% | – | – | – | 48% | – | 26% |
| 6–7 Jul 2022 | YouGov | N/A | 716 | – | – | – | – | 38% | 43% | – | – | – | 19% |
| 6–7 Jul 2022 | YouGov | N/A | 716 | – | – | – | – | 30% | – | – | 51% | – | 19% |
| 6–7 Jul 2022 | YouGov | N/A | 716 | – | – | – | – | – | 29% | – | 48% | – | 26% |

=== Public ===
Preferred leader

| Dates conducted | Pollster | Client | Sample size | Rishi Sunak | Liz Truss | Tom Tugendhat | Jeremy Hunt | Sajid Javid | Penny Mordaunt | Suella Braverman | Nadhim Zahawi | Kemi Badenoch | Grant Shapps | Michael Gove | Ben Wallace | Dominic Raab | Don't Know | Other |
|---|---|---|---|---|---|---|---|---|---|---|---|---|---|---|---|---|---|---|
| 31 August 2022 | Electoral Calculus/Find Out Now | NA | 2,263 | 27% | 16% | NA | NA | NA | NA | NA | NA | NA | NA | NA | NA | NA | 57% | NA |
| 11 July 2022 | Electoral Calculus/Find Out Now | NA | 2,019 | 11% | 5% | 4% | 4% | 4% | 3% | 2% | 1% | 1% | 1% | NA | NA | NA | 52% | 13% |
| 6–7 Jul 2022 | YouGov | The Times | 1,687 | 13% | 3% | 2% | 4% | 4% | 2% | NA | 2% | NA | NA | 3% | 3% | 4% | 28% | 32% |

== Results ==
| Candidate | MPs' 1st ballot: 13 July 2022 | | MPs' 2nd ballot: 14 July 2022 | | | MPs' 3rd ballot: 18 July 2022 | | | MPs' 4th ballot: 19 July 2022 | | | MPs' 5th ballot: 20 July 2022 | | | Members' vote 22 July to 2 September 2022 | | |
| Candidate | Votes | % | Votes | ± | % | Votes | ± | % | Votes | ± | % | Votes | ± | % | Votes | % | % Votes cast |
|---|---|---|---|---|---|---|---|---|---|---|---|---|---|---|---|---|---|
| Liz Truss | 50 | 14.0 | 64 | +14 | 17.9 | 71 | +7 | 19.8 | 86 | +15 | 24.1 | 113 | +27 | 31.6 | 81,326 | 47.2 | 57.4 |
| Rishi Sunak | 88 | 24.6 | 101 | +13 | 28.2 | 115 | +14 | 32.1 | 118 | +3 | 33.1 | 137 | +19 | 38.3 | 60,399 | 35.0 | 42.6 |
| Penny Mordaunt | 67 | 18.7 | 83 | +16 | 23.2 | 82 | −1 | 22.9 | 92 | +10 | 25.8 | 105 | +13 | 29.3 | Eliminated | | |
| Kemi Badenoch | 40 | 11.2 | 49 | +9 | 13.7 | 58 | +9 | 16.2 | 59 | +1 | 16.5 | Eliminated | | | | | |
| Tom Tugendhat | 37 | 10.3 | 32 | −5 | 8.9 | 31 | −1 | 8.7 | Eliminated | | | | | | | | |
| Suella Braverman | 32 | 8.9 | 27 | −5 | 7.5 | Eliminated | | | | | | | | | | | |
| Nadhim Zahawi | 25 | 7.0 | Eliminated | | | | | | | | | | | | | | |
| Jeremy Hunt | 18 | 5.0 | Eliminated | | | | | | | | | | | | | | |
| Votes cast (Note: Due to rounding errors the sum of percentages may deviate.) | 357 | 99.7 | 356 | −1 | 99.4 | 357 | +1 | 99.7 | 355 | −2 | 99.4 | 355 | 0 | 99.2 | 141,725 | 82.2 | 100 |
| Spoilt ballots | 0 | 0.0 | 0 | 0 | 0.0 | 0 | 0 | 0.0 | 1 | +1 | 0.3 | 2 | +1 | 0.6 | 654 | 0.4 | |
| Abstentions | 1 | 0.3 | 2 | +1 | 0.6 | 1 | −1 | 0.3 | 1 | 0 | 0.3 | 1 | 0 | 0.3 | 30,058 | 17.4 | |
| Registered voters | 358 | 100.0 | 358 | 0 | 100.0 | 358 | 0 | 100.0 | 357 | −1 | 100.0 | 358 | +1 | 100.0 | 172,437 | 100.0 | |

Qualification
Rehman Chishti, Sajid Javid and Grant Shapps failed to secure the backing of at least 20 Conservative Party MPs to qualify for the first ballot. Eight candidates qualified for the first ballot.

First ballot
The MPs' first ballot was held on 13 July 2022. Nadhim Zahawi and Jeremy Hunt failed to reach the required support of 30 MPs. There was one abstention, namely Gavin Williamson, who arrived too late to vote.

Second ballot
The MPs' second ballot was held on 14 July 2022. Suella Braverman, with 27 votes, had the fewest votes and was eliminated from the leadership race.

Third ballot
The MPs' third ballot was held on 18 July 2022. Tom Tugendhat, with 31 votes, had the fewest votes and was eliminated from the leadership race.

Fourth ballot
The MPs' fourth ballot was held on 19 July 2022. Tobias Ellwood had lost the Conservative Party whip, making him ineligible to vote. Kemi Badenoch, with 59 votes, had the fewest votes and was eliminated from the leadership race.

Fifth ballot
The MPs' fifth ballot was held on 20 July 2022. The Conservative Party whip was temporarily restored to Tobias Ellwood, allowing him to vote. Penny Mordaunt, with 105 votes, had the fewest votes and was eliminated from the leadership race.

Members' vote
The final ballot, in which all Conservative Party members were eligible to vote, took place from 22 July to 2 September, with the results announced on 5 September. Liz Truss was declared winner, with 81,326 votes to Rishi Sunak's 60,399. In her victory speech, Truss thanked Johnson and stated that she would cut taxes. Truss was congratulated by world leaders including German Chancellor Olaf Scholz, president of the European Commission Ursula von der Leyen and Japanese Prime Minister Fumio Kishida.

== See also ==
- Truss ministry
- 2017 Fine Gael leadership election
