= Claudia Carawan =

American singer-songwriter and pianist

Claudia Carawan (born April 19, 1959, Alexandria, Virginia, United States) is an American singer-songwriter and pianist. Although she has been creating and performing music for more than 20 years, it took until 2003 before she released her debut album, Out of the Blue. It derives its sound from several styles including soul, R&B, reggae and jazz. Carawan is a cousin of the folk musician Guy Carawan.

== Discography ==
- Out of the Blue (2003)
- Fearless (2008)
- Unfinished Business • Li’l Ronnie & The Bluebeats Featuring Claudia Carawan (2013)
- Joy Rising (2013)
