= Out of the Blues =

Out of the Blues may refer to:

- Out of the Blues (album), by Boz Scaggs, 2018
- Out of the Blues: The Best of David Bromberg, an album by David Bromberg, 1977
- Out of the Blues, an album by Jean-Pierre Danel, 2010
- Out of the Blues, an album by Rita Coolidge, 1996
- "Out of the Blues", a song by Kelsea Ballerini from The First Time, 2015
- "Out of the Blues", a song by Indian Ocean from Indian Ocean, 1993

== See also ==
- Out of the Blue (disambiguation)
