= Out the Blue =

Out the Blue may refer to:

- "Out the Blue" (John Lennon song), 1973
- "Out the Blue" (Sub Focus song), 2012
- "Out the Blue", a song by Roll Deep from Winner Stays On

== See also ==
- Out of the Blue (disambiguation)
