= Out of the Blue (Claudia Carawan album) =

Studio album by Claudia Carawan
- Released: 2003
- Genre: soul, R&B, jazz
- Length: 48:09
- Label: Heart Over the Bar, Inc.
- Producer: Claudia Carawan, Grant Rutledge, Jody Boyd

Claudia Carawan chronology
Out of the Blue (2003)	Fearless (2008)

Out of the Blue is the debut of Claudia Carawan, and derives its sound from several styles including soul, old school R&B, reggae and jazz. The lyrics of the album lean heavily on messages of hope, love, and inspiration. The album was released to positive reviews; Andy Garrigue commented that "Both sultry and righteous, sassy and pouting, Carawan's got a hair raising set of pipes. She sets a mood impossible to ignore."

== Track listing ==
1. "The Journey" - 4:13
2. "The People Who Love You" - 4:09
3. "Love Came Home" - 4:56
4. "Everything I Need" - 5:00
5. "Guardian Angel" - 4:16
6. "Leap of Faith" - 3:54
7. "I Wish You Well" - 4:49
8. "It's Gonna Come Back To You" - 3:31
9. "Count Your Blessings (Instead of Sheep)" (Irving Berlin) - 4:25
10. "Brighter Day" - 6:14
11. "What a Wonderful World" (Bob Thiele / George David Weiss) - 2:42
