= Out of the Blue (book) =

2022 book by Harry Cole and James Heale

Out of the Blue: The Inside Story of the Unexpected Rise and Rapid Fall of Liz Truss
- Author: Harry Cole and James Heale
- Working title: Out of the Blue: The Inside Story of Liz Truss and Her Astonishing Rise to Power; Out of the Blue: The Inside Story of Liz Truss and Her Explosive Rise to Power
- Language: English
- Subject: Liz Truss
- Genre: Political biography
- Publisher: HarperCollins
- Publication date: 1 November 2022 (ebook); 24 November 2022 (print and audio)
- Publication place: United Kingdom
- ISBN: 978-0-008-60578-0

Out of the Blue: The Inside Story of the Unexpected Rise and Rapid Fall of Liz Truss is a non-fiction book about the British politician Liz Truss, written by Harry Cole and James Heale, published as an ebook on 1 November 2022 and in print and audio on 24 November.

Announced by HarperCollins as Out of the Blue: The Inside Story of Liz Truss and Her Astonishing Rise to Power shortly after Truss took office in September 2022, with a planned publication date of 8 December, it was re-titled Out of the Blue: The Inside Story of Liz Truss and Her Explosive Rise to Power amidst the October 2022 United Kingdom government crisis. Truss's announcement on 20 October that she would resign as Prime Minister of the United Kingdom prompted Cole and Heale to rewrite parts of the book and add a chapter at the end, and led to a second change to the book's title and the moving-up of its publication date.

== Drafting ==
=== Inception and initial drafting ===
Liz Truss became prime minister on 6 September 2022, following the resignation of Boris Johnson and her victory over Rishi Sunak in the Conservative leadership election. Two days later, The Guardian reported HarperCollins's intention to publish Out of the Blue: The Inside Story of Liz Truss and Her Astonishing Rise to Power, to be written by Harry Cole, the politics editor at The Sun, and James Heale, the diary editor at The Spectator, with a planned publication date of 8 December. While the publication is not an authorised biography, Andrew Anthony with The Guardian speculates that Truss was the source for a substantial amount of the book's information. According to Anthony, this might be due to Truss's frequent rumoured media leaks to Cole.

The book's blurb described it as about "the rise of the geeky teenage Lib Dem who transformed into the queen of the Brexiteers". The Bookseller quoted Cole and Heale as saying Truss "has been written off, belittled and undermined throughout her march to power", and expressing a desire to explain her rise to the prime minister's office.

Cole and Heale finished writing the original version of Out of the Blue in early October. It is the first published biography of Truss.

=== Government crisis and Truss's resignation ===
The government fell into crisis in October 2022. Robbie Griffiths of the Evening Standard speculated on 5 October that, with Out of the Blue set to be sent to the printers "in the next few days", Truss's "turbulent start to the job" put Cole and Heale in a difficult position. On 19 October, the subtitle was changed, replacing the word "astonishing" with "explosive"; the book was for a time pulled from Amazon in the United States for review. The same day, at Prime Minister's Questions, Leader of the Opposition Keir Starmer joked:

A book is being written about the Prime Minister's time in office. Apparently it's going to be out by Christmas. Is that the release date or the title?

Heale tweeted in response: "Your copy is in the post, thanks @Keir_Starmer". Private Eye accused Starmer of stealing the joke from the issue they had published that day, which referred to Out of the Blue as "Due out on 8 December. (The book, that is. Not its subject.)".

Truss announced her resignation a day later, making her the shortest-serving prime minister in British history. Soon after, Heale tweeted, "Back to the rewrites...". He said in an interview with Bloomberg News that he and Cole would edit the book and add a new chapter, titled "Into the Red". Truss's resignation also caused the cancellation of Cole and Heale's scheduled third interview with her.

Five days after Truss announced her resignation, HarperCollins announced a second change in subtitle, this time to The Inside Story of the Unexpected Rise and Rapid Fall of Liz Truss, and moved the publication date forward, to 1 November for the ebook edition and 24 November for the print and audio editions. In a press release, HarperCollins quoted Cole and Heale as saying, "The irony is not lost on us that our biography of a politician whose rise and fall was built upon her ability to shapeshift with startling speed, has itself now needed a lightning retool to keep up with her."

== Contents ==
Out of the Blue is prefaced with an authors' note, in which Cole and Heale remark that the book's production was rushed. As such, they warn the reader that the book does not match the quality of the work of an author such as Robert Caro, who profiled the US president Lyndon B. Johnson. The book is split into two parts, with the first detailing Truss's early life and path to the premiership and the second recounting her seven weeks as prime minister.

The start of Out of the Blue traces Truss's childhood through her time at university. Her parents were liberal and somewhat unconventional. As a child, Truss's mother Priscilla, took her to Greenham Common protests. Priscilla would wear a yellow banana costume; the book notes that the costume invited mockery from the younger Truss's peers. The book also highlights her polemical nature early on; Charlotte Ivers of The Times wrote in her review that the book seemingly indicated that Truss's "university and school years primarily consisted of starting fights with anyone and everyone she encountered".

Out of the Blue then recounts Truss's campaign for a seat in the House of Commons, covering the difficulties that arose due to her previously undisclosed affair with Mark Field, a former Conservative MP. While the book does note that the affair was much more damaging for Truss than it was for Field, it only cursorily mentions the more lurid allegations made against Truss. After being elected to the Commons in 2010, Truss becomes parliamentary under-secretary of state at the Department for Education under David Cameron. The book talks about her unsuccessful reform proposal that would have decreased the number of adults employed as caretakers.

After her early career, Out of the Blue covers Truss's stint as foreign secretary. The book notes her indulgences in the job, asking embassies to provide her with Sauvignon blanc wine, as well as to avoid mass-produced coffee and packaged sandwiches; it describes multiple instances in which Truss forwent sleep in favour of drinking, and then drinking espressos to get through the next day's meetings. The book also portrays her as having a penchant for media exposure over policy meetings, preferring photo ops to trade discussions with diplomats and having civil servants go to lengths to make sure she had good opportunities to post to Instagram.

== Reception ==
Reception for Out of the Blue was mixed, with reviewers assessing the book as having hasty and provocative prose, but also substantive and informative writing. While reviewing the book for The Times, Charlotte Ivers wrote that the book "makes for a fantastic read" but "bears more resemblance to the work of Armando Iannucci" than Robert Caro. Writing for The Guardian, Gaby Hinsliff refers to Out of the Blue's second half as "essentially a Sunday newspaper long read on acid" and says that overall that the prose is "clunky in places", but says that the first half is "very readable". Despite her criticism of the prose, Hinsliff compliments the substance of the book, continuing that "nobody is going to be buying this book for its literary elegance; the point is to rubberneck at what remains of the crash site". Ivers similarly commented that the book explained why Truss's premiership ended so quickly, writing that "Out of the Blue's strength is in showing the inevitability of its outcome (impressive, considering that most of it was written before said outcome)".

Out of the Blue was named as The Sunday Times political book of the year. The Guardian named it as one of the best political books of 2023.
