= Tom Newton Dunn =

English journalist (born 1973)

- Born: Thomas Zoltan Newton Dunn; 16 December 1973 (age 52); St Pancras, London, England
- Education: Marlborough College
- Alma mater: University of Edinburgh
- Occupation: Journalist
- Years active: 1996–present
- Spouse: Dominie Moss (m. 2004)
- Children: 2
- Parents: Bill Newton Dunn (father); Anna Arki (mother)

Thomas Zoltan Newton Dunn (born 16 December 1973), known as Tom Newton Dunn, is an English broadcast journalist and former newspaper journalist. He presented First Edition, an evening news programme on talkTV.

He was the political editor of The Sun from 2009 to 2020, having previously worked for ten years as a defence journalist and foreign reporter. In 2020 he became chief political commentator at Times Radio, before stepping down to join talkTV.

Prior to joining Times Radio, Newton Dunn regularly appeared on BBC News and Sky News, and was one of the hosts of BBC Radio 4's Week in Westminster. He also appeared on the former What the Papers Say.

== Early life and family ==
Newton Dunn was born in St Pancras, London, to Bill Newton Dunn, a Conservative and later Liberal Democrat Member of the European Parliament, and his Hungarian-born wife Anna Arki.

Through the mother of his father, his great-grandfather was cricketer Francis Brooke (cricketer, born 1884). His father's sister, Angela, married the son of former Conservative MP Gresham Cooke in September 1971; the older brother of Angela's husband is the father of George Monbiot; George Monbiot is Angela's nephew.

He was educated at Marlborough College, an independent school in Wiltshire. He studied English Literature at the University of Edinburgh, graduating with an undergraduate Master of Arts (MA Hons) degree.

Between 2005 and 2014, his mother ran the European Movement Speaker Service, which provided "Pro Europe speakers for educational establishments and civic societies to debate all aspects of Britain's membership of the EU". His father, who was a strong supporter of the UK adopting the Euro currency, defected from the Conservatives to the Liberal Democrats in 2000 due to the Conservatives' Euroscepticism.

== Career ==
Newton Dunn joined The Daily Telegraph as a diary reporter for the Peterborough column in 1996, moving to the Daily Mirror to join its graduate trainee scheme the following year. He spent several years (1999–2001) with the Mirror as a news reporter, before being made the paper's defence correspondent after the 9/11 terrorist attacks and covering the Afghanistan and Iraq Wars.

In 2004, he moved to The Sun as the paper's defence editor. He was promoted to the role of political editor there in 2009, although it was intended for him to remain involved in the title's defence coverage. During his time at The Sun, he was a broadcast commentator on politics, appearing on BBC Two's Sunday Politics programme, and occasionally hosting BBC Radio 4's The Week in Westminster. Newton Dunn has also been a panellist on Any Questions?, and reviewed the papers on Sky News. Before the programme's demise he sometimes hosted What the Papers Say.

It is reported that in 2017, when because of her mobility problems the Queen decided to watch the Remembrance Day ceremony from the balcony of the FCO, Newton Dunn tweeted that "it is the duty of the Queen to attend even if she has to crawl there." After his being rebuked by Sir Alan Duncan, the tweet was deleted.

Newton Dunn left The Sun to become a presenter and chief political commentator at the newly-formed Times Radio in summer 2020. He was replaced as political editor by Harry Cole. In March 2021 Newton Dunn briefly wrote a weekly political column for the Evening Standard in the slot left vacant by the departure of editor-in-chief George Osborne.

He moved to talkTV ahead of its launch, presenting an hour-long weekday news update called The News Desk . The programme was switched from its original 7pm timeslot to 10pm and renamed First Edition after only reaching small audiences. He secured the first interview with former chancellor Kwasi Kwarteng following the collapse of Liz Truss' government.

== Awards ==
Newton Dunn won the Scoop of the Year award at the 2008 British Press Awards for revealing the cockpit tapes behind the Matty Hull friendly fire incident. He also won Scoop of the Year for the Matty Hull friendly fire incident story at the 2007 What The Papers Say Awards.

In 2015, he won the Politics Journalism award at the annual British Journalism Awards for revealing the Plebgate scandal, which was successfully defended from a libel suit brought by Conservative MP and former Government Chief Whip Andrew Mitchell. He was threatened with arrest by the police if he didn't reveal his sources for Plebgate and did not do so.

== Far-right conspiracy theory incident ==
In December 2019, Newton Dunn wrote an article for The Sun titled "'HIJACKED LABOUR'", in which he reported that former British intelligence officers had produced a chart alleging that "Jeremy Corbyn is at the centre of an extraordinary network of hard-left extremists". It later emerged that the ultimate sources for these claims included the antisemitic, far-right websites Aryan Unity and the Millennium Report, the latter described by Vice as "an antisemitic conspiracy site known for publishing articles with titles like, 'The Jewish Hand in World Wars'". The 'HIJACKED LABOUR' thesis was described as a "far-right conspiracy theory" by Daniel Trilling in The Guardian. The left-wing magazines Tribune and Jacobin argued that such articles were a danger to journalists and those on the political left, with Jacobin calling the chart a "hit list".

Newton Dunn's article was deleted on the same day of its publication, without comment from him or his newspaper. The Independent Press Standards Organisation subsequently confirmed to The Guardian that it had received a complaint concerning the piece, and Peter Geoghegan of openDemocracy expressed his strong concern at his organisation being named as part of this alleged network. In February 2020, IPSO responded to the complaint and "decided that it [did] not raise a possible breach of the Editors' Code".

== Personal life ==
His wife is from Woodham Mortimer in Essex. They had sons in June 2009 and June 2011.

== Publications ==
Newton Dunn has ghost-written two non-fiction books by military veterans:

- Sniper One (2006) by Sgt. Dan Mills – ISBN 978-0141029016
- Apache (2008) by Ed Macy – ISBN 978-0007288175

Media offices
Preceded by George Pascoe-Watson	Political Editor of The Sun; 2009–2020	Succeeded by Harry Cole
