= Harry Cole (journalist) =

British journalist (born 1986)

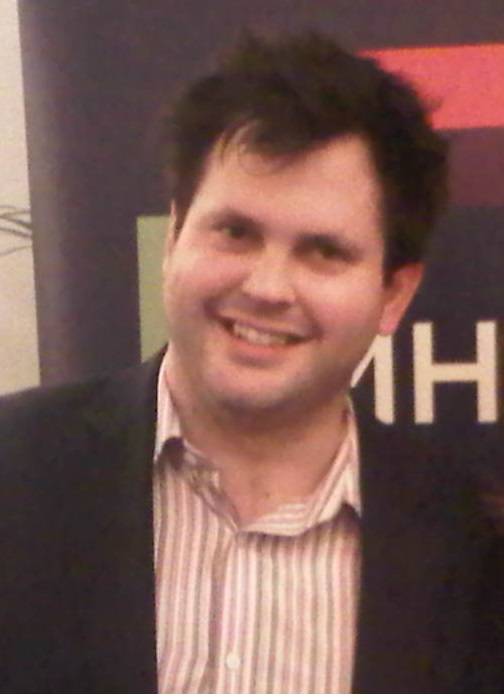
- Cole in 2012
- Born: 27 April 1986 (age 39)
- Education: Sevenoaks School; Tonbridge School
- Alma mater: University of Edinburgh
- Occupation: Journalist

Harry Cole (born 27 April 1986) is a British journalist who is the editor-at-large of the US edition of The Sun. From 2020 to 2025, he was the UK political editor, having previously been the deputy political editor of The Mail On Sunday.

== Early life and education ==
Cole was born on 27 April 1986. His early education was at Sevenoaks School and Tonbridge School, both private schools in Kent. He studied anthropology and economic history at the University of Edinburgh, graduating with an undergraduate Master of Arts (MA Hons) degree in 2009. While at university, he was Vice-Chairman and Treasurer of the Edinburgh University Conservative Association. and was Vice-President of Scottish Conservative Future. He also wrote the Tory Bear blog which focussed on right-wing political gossip.

He ran to become Edinburgh University Students' Association President in 2008. Cole withdrew his candidacy after the student newspaper The Journal reported that his campaign was behind the anonymous blog EUSAless which had criticised the union and other candidates including an attack on another candidate's sexual orientation. He had previously denied involvement when asked and had urged other candidates to sign a clean campaign pledge.

== Career ==
Paul Staines hired Cole initially as an intern for his right-wing website Guido Fawkes due to his involvement in EUSAless. His first major story was coverage of the United Kingdom parliamentary expenses scandal in 2009. Cole reported that Guido Fawkes made most of its money through selling stories to newspapers but this revenue stream dwindled after the Leveson Inquiry so he later became a diarist in the tabloid newspapers The Daily Star Sunday in 2012 and The Sun on Sunday in 2013. During his time at Guido Fawkes, he was also a contributing editor for The Spectator. He left Guido Fawkes in 2015 to become the Westminster Correspondent for The Sun. Cole then moved to The Mail on Sunday in 2018 as deputy political editor before returning to The Sun and replacing Tom Newton Dunn as its political editor in 2020.

Cole's stories include the then Health Secretary Matt Hancock's extramarital affair with his aide Gina Coladangelo and their breaking of COVID-19 social distancing restrictions in 2021 which won Scoop of the Year at the British Journalism Awards. In September 2022, it was announced that Cole and fellow journalist James Heale would be writing a book about the British Conservative Party politician Liz Truss who had recently become prime minister after winning the July–September 2022 Conservative Party leadership election called Out of the Blue. It was published in November 2022. Out of the Blue was named as The Sunday Times political book of the year. In 2023, the New Statesman named Cole as one of the 50 most influential right-wing figures in the UK.

He hosted Never Mind the Ballots, a weekly politics show by The Sun between March 2024 and June 2025. During the night of the 2024 United Kingdom general election, he presented The Sun's coverage of the election, previously interviewing both Rishi Sunak and Keir Starmer on the special Never Mind the Ballots episode "Election Showdown". Cole left his role as political editor to become the editor-at-large of the US edition of The Sun in June 2025. He was succeeded by Jack Elsom who had been the newspaper's chief political correspondent since 2021.

In September 2025, Cole interviewed Peter Mandelson amid the controversy surrounding his relationship with sex offender Jeffrey Epstein.

Media offices
Preceded by Tom Newton Dunn	Political Editor of The Sun; 2020–present	Incumbent
