= Keir Starmer as Leader of the Opposition =

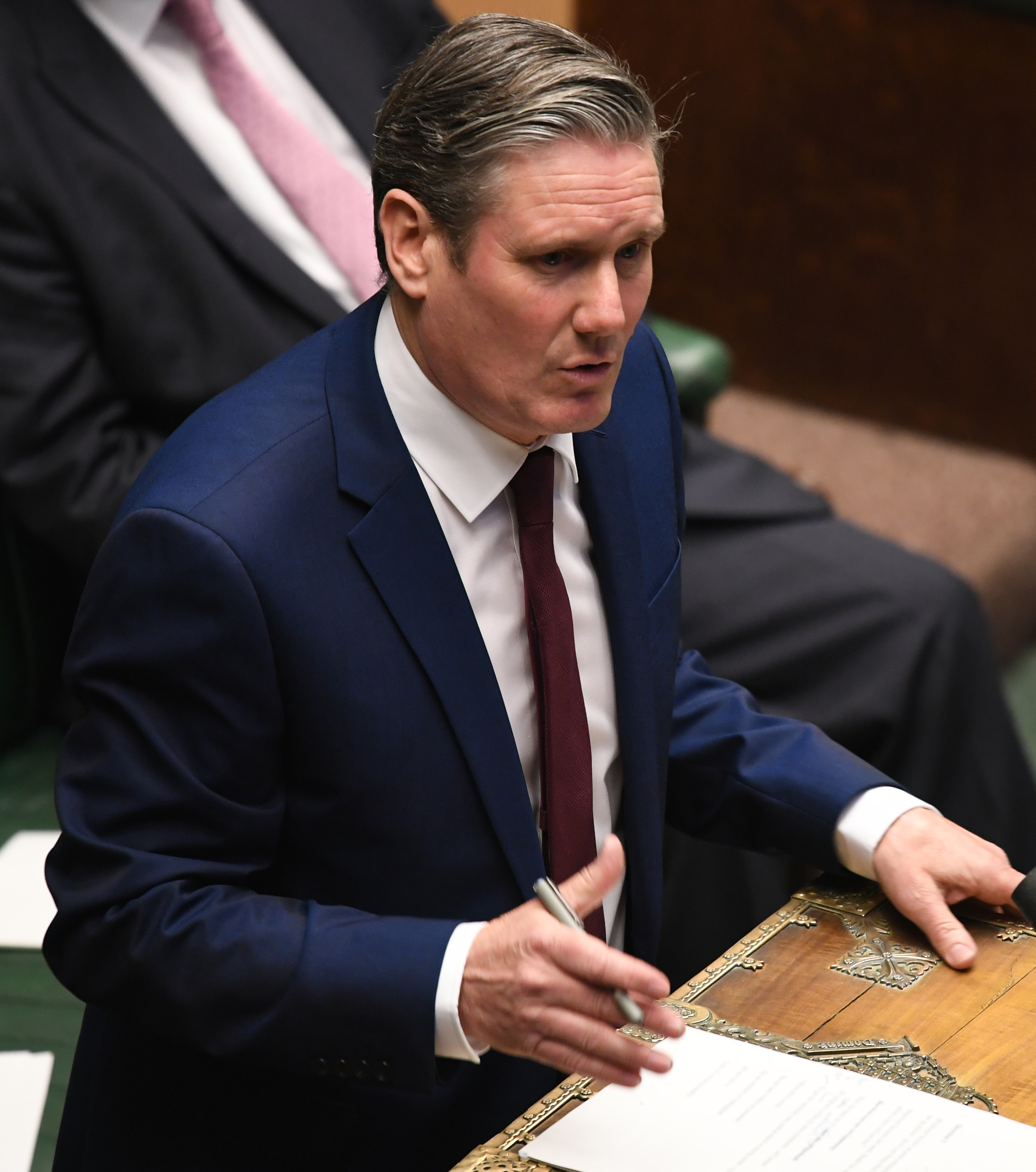
- Starmer in 2020
- Official Opposition leadership of Keir Starmer; 4 April 2020 – 5 July 2024
- Monarchs: Elizabeth II; Charles III
- Cabinet: Starmer shadow cabinet
- Party: Labour
- Election: 2020 (leadership); 2024 (general)
- Constituency: Holborn and St Pancras

Keir Starmer served as Leader of the Opposition from April 2020, following the resignation of Jeremy Corbyn after Labour's defeat at the 2019 general election and Starmer's election as Labour leader in the ensuing leadership election, until his party won a landslide victory at the 2024 general election in July 2024. During his tenure, Starmer moved Labour toward the political centre and emphasised the elimination of antisemitism within the party. Membership of the party under Starmer's leadership has more than halved: it fell from 550,000 in 2020 to 370,000 by 2023, and continued to fall in the following years, reaching 250,000 by the end of 2025.

Having become Leader of the Opposition amid the COVID-19 pandemic, Starmer said in his acceptance speech that he would refrain from "scoring party political points" and would work with the government "in the national interest". He later became more critical of the government's response to the pandemic following the Partygate scandal. Amid the historic number of ministers resigning from Boris Johnson's government in July 2022, Starmer proposed a vote of no confidence in the government, stating that Johnson could not be allowed to remain in office given the large-scale revolt by his own ministers. Starmer also criticised Johnson's government, as well as the governments of his successors Liz Truss and Rishi Sunak, for issues such as the Chris Pincher scandal and subsequent government crisis, the economic crisis resulting from the 2022 mini-budget and subsequent government crisis, the cost of living crisis and the National Health Service strikes and other industrial disputes and strikes.

As Labour leader, Starmer focused on repositioning the party away from the left, promising of economic stability, tackling small boat crossings, cutting NHS waiting times and ''rebuilding the NHS'', worker rights enrichment, energy independence and infrastructure development, tackling crime, improving education and training, reforming public services, renationalising the railway network, and recruiting 6,500 teachers. Starmer also pledged to end antisemitism in the party. During his time in office, Starmer was accused by members of his own party of marginalising the Labour left and denying genocide in Gaza. Under his leadership, Corbyn was expelled from the party. Labour made significant gains in the 2023 and 2024 local elections, and won a landslide victory in the 2024 general election. After Starmer became Prime Minister, he was succeeded as Leader of the Opposition by Sunak.

== Background ==
Keir Starmer was selected in December 2014 to be the Labour parliamentary candidate for the Labour UK constituency of Holborn and St Pancras, a safe seat, following the decision of the sitting MP Frank Dobson to retire. Starmer was elected at the 2015 general election with a majority of 17,048. Following Corbyn's win in the 2016 Labour leadership election in September, Starmer accepted a new post under Corbyn as Shadow Secretary of State for Exiting the European Union.

In the 2019 general election, Labour suffered its worst election defeat since 1935, with the Conservative Party earning an 80-seat majority. Labour won 203 seats, gaining 32.2% of the vote. This was the Labour Party's fourth consecutive general election defeat. Following Labour's defeat, Corbyn announced that he would stand down as Leader of the Labour Party. Starmer began to distance himself from Corbyn's leadership and many of the policies he put forward at the election, revealing in 2024 that he was "certain that we would lose the 2019 election". Following the party's defeat at the 2019 election, Corbyn announced that he would stand down as Leader of the Labour Party following a "process of reflection".

== Labour leadership bid ==
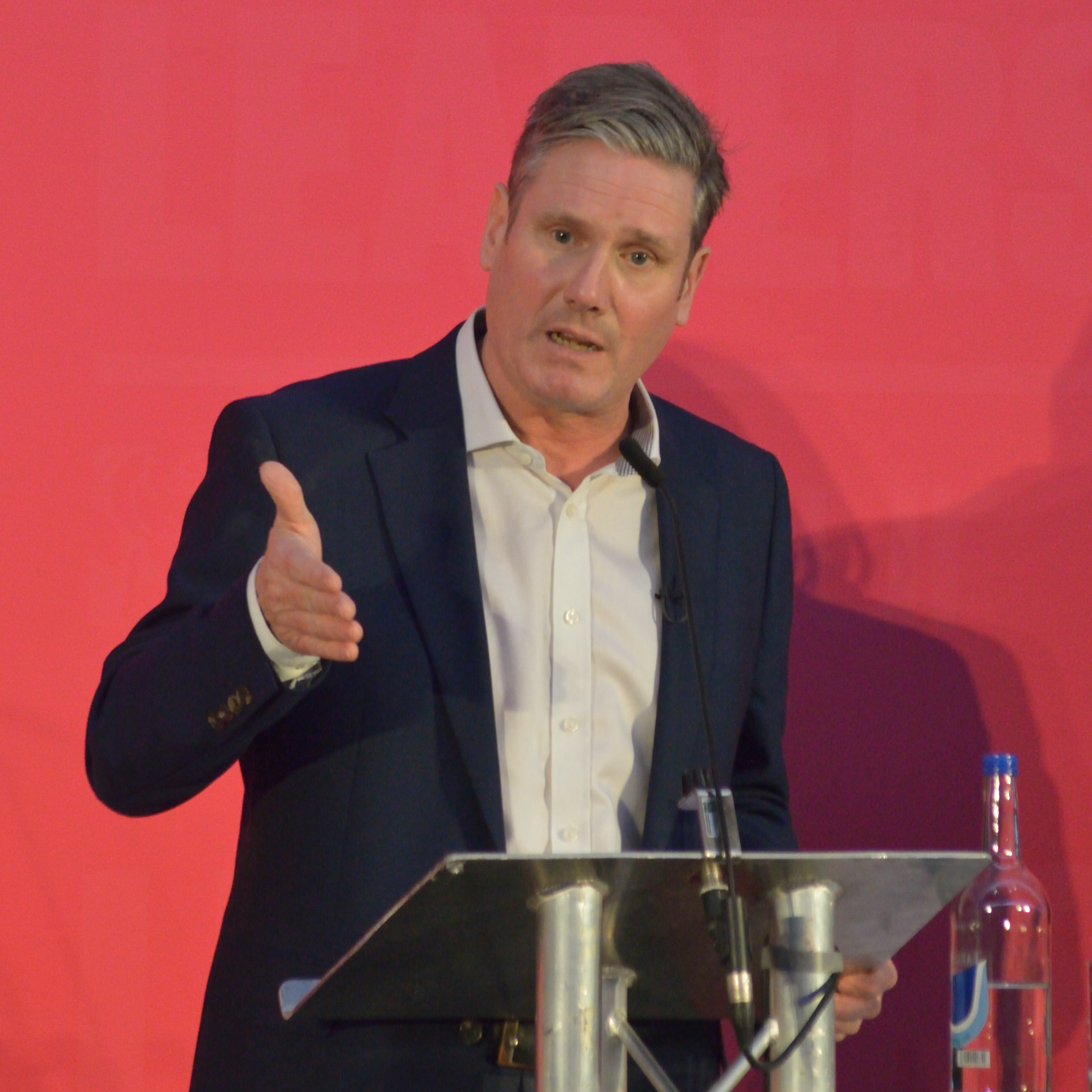
Starmer speaking at the 2020 Labour Party leadership election hustings in Bristol

On 4 January 2020, Starmer announced his candidacy for the 2020 Labour Party leadership election, following the resignation of Jeremy Corbyn after Labour's defeat at the 2019 general election. By 8 January, it was reported that Starmer had gained enough nominations from Labour MPs and MEPs to get onto the ballot paper, and that the trade union Unison was backing him. Unison, with 1.3 million members, said Starmer was the best placed candidate to unite the party and regain public trust. He also gained support from former Labour Prime Minister Gordon Brown and Mayor of London Sadiq Khan.

During the leadership election, Starmer ran a left-wing platform. He positioned himself in opposition to austerity, stating that Corbyn was "right" to position Labour as the "party of anti-austerity". He indicated he will continue with the Labour policy of scrapping tuition fees as well as pledging "common ownership" of rail, mail, energy and water companies and called for ending outsourcing in the NHS, local governments and the justice system. Supporters of Rebecca Long-Bailey criticised Starmer for releasing details of his campaign donations on the register of members' interests rather than independently, as Long-Bailey and Lisa Nandy had done, which meant that some details of his donors were not published until after the election had ended. Starmer went on to win the leadership contest on 4 April 2020, defeating Long-Bailey and Nandy, with 56.2% of the vote in the first round, and subsequently became Leader of the Opposition.

== Tenure as Leader of the Opposition ==
It is the honour and the privilege of my life to be elected as leader of the Labour Party. It comes at a moment like none other in our lifetime. Under my leadership we will engage constructively with the Government, not opposition for opposition's sake. Not scoring party political points or making impossible demands. But with the courage to support where that's the right thing to do. I want to thank Rebecca and Lisa for running such passionate and powerful campaigns and for their friendship and support along the way. I want to thank our Labour Party staff who worked really hard and my own amazing campaign team, full of positivity, with that unifying spirit. I want to pay tribute to Jeremy Corbyn, who led our party through some really difficult times, who energised our movement and who's a friend as well as a colleague. And to all of our members, supporters and affiliates I say this: whether you voted for me or not I will represent you, I will listen to you and I will bring our party together.

— Keir Starmer's acceptance speech, April 2020

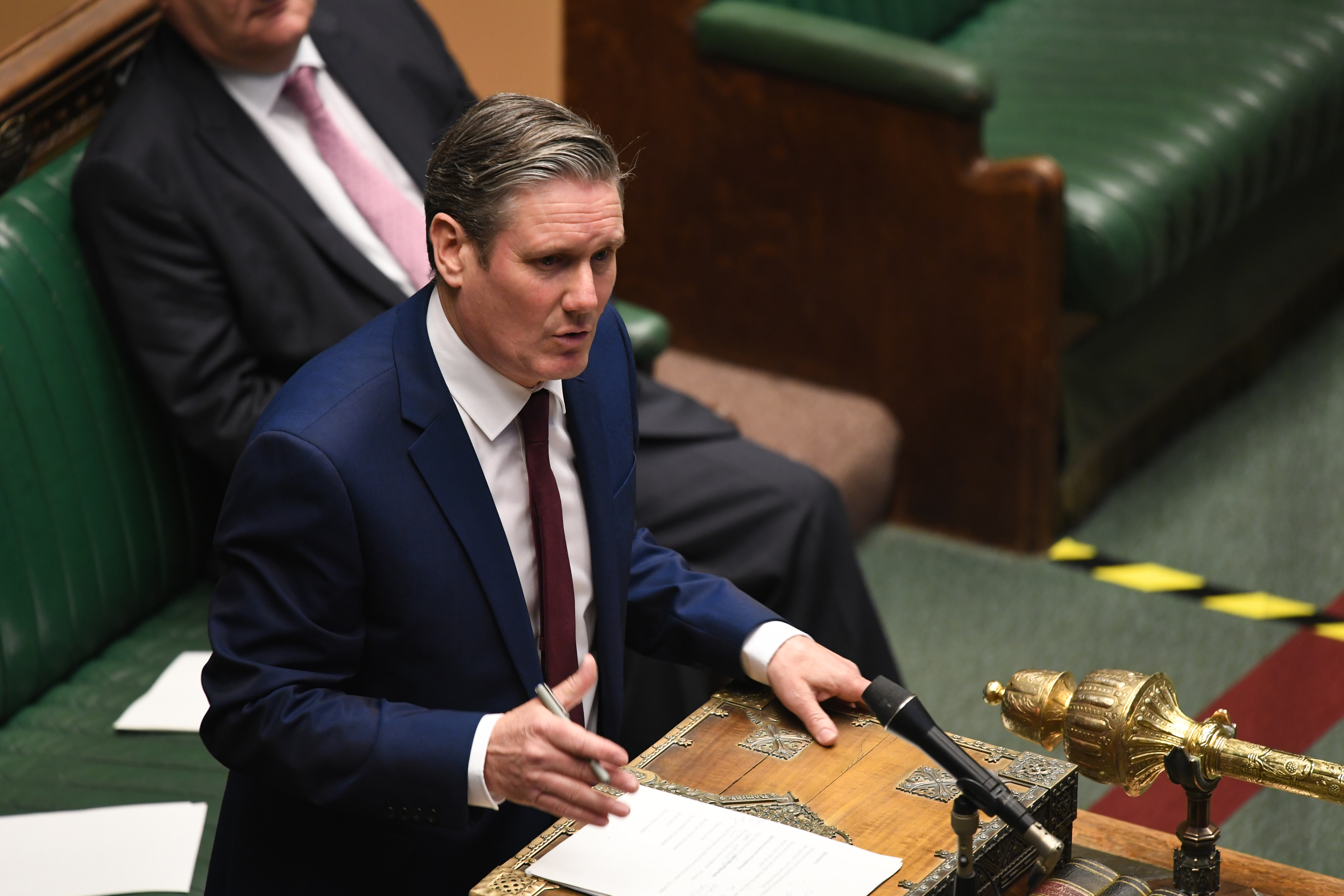
Starmer speaking during Prime Minister's Questions, 22 April 2020

Having become the Leader of the Opposition amid the COVID-19 pandemic, Starmer said he would refrain from "scoring party political points" and would work with Boris Johnson's government "in the national interest". He later became more critical of the government's response to the pandemic following the Partygate scandal. Starmer also criticised Johnson's government, as well as the governments of his successors Liz Truss and Rishi Sunak, for issues such as the Chris Pincher scandal and subsequent government crisis, the economic crisis resulting from the 2022 mini-budget and subsequent government crisis, the cost of living crisis and the National Health Service strikes and other industrial disputes and strikes. Amid the historic number of ministers resigning from Johnson's government in July 2022, Starmer proposed a vote of no confidence in Johnson's government, stating that Johnson could not be allowed to remain in office given the large-scale revolt by his own ministers. Starmer's questioning strategy against Johnson, Truss and Sunak was similar to that of a prosecutor.

=== Policies ===
Starmer's tenure saw the party move closer towards the political centre. Speaking at the party's annual conference in 2021, the first time Starmer addressed the annual conference in person since becoming the leader, he presented his focus on stronger economy and tougher stances on crime, repositioning the party away from the previous leadership. By 2022, Starmer had dropped most of the socialist policies he advocated during his leadership run, including pledges made to nationalise water and energy, scrap tuition fees, and defend free movement within the EU. Starmer responded to criticism in 2023 by stating that they remained "important statements of value and principle", but cited the COVID-19 pandemic, the Russian invasion of Ukraine and the economic crisis resulting from the 2022 mini-budget as having meant that these pledges have had to be adapted.

Under Starmer's tenure, the party still supports the renationalisation of Britain's railways, and has pledged to create a publicly owned energy company, Great British Energy, to "compete with private industry and promote clean energy", differentiated from full nationalisation of the energy industry as previously pledged. In February 2023, Starmer set out five "national missions" as the basis for Labour's manifesto for the 2024 general election: achieving the highest sustained growth in the G7 by the end of his first term, establishing the UK as a "clean energy superpower" with zero-carbon electricity by 2030; enacting health and care reform, improving the justice system, and dismantling the barriers to opportunity" with education and childcare reforms. Upon becoming Labour leader, he tasked Brown with recommending British constitutional reforms. The report was published in 2022 and was endorsed and promoted by Starmer, and recommended the abolition of the House of Lords, extending greater powers to local councils and mayors, and deeper devolution to the countries of the United Kingdom. In November 2022, Starmer said that he would strip politicians of the power to appoint people to the House of Lords in the first term of a Labour government, adding that the public's trust in the political system had been undermined by successive Conservative leaders granting peerages to "lackeys and donors". Labour's 2024 election manifesto Change, however, did not recommend abolition to the House of Lords, instead committing only to removal of the remaining hereditary peers from the chamber, setting a mandatory retirement age of 80, and beginning a consultation on replacing the Lords with a "more representative" body.

==== Antisemitism reforms ====
Following past accusations of new antisemitism in the party during Corbyn's tenure, Starmer pledged to end antisemitism in the party during his acceptance speech, saying "Anti-semitism has been a stain on our party. I have seen the grief that it's brought to so many Jewish communities. On behalf of the Labour Party, I am sorry. And I will tear out this poison by its roots and judge success by the return of Jewish members and those who felt that they could no longer support us."

In April 2020, an internal party report on antisemitism (The Work of the Labour Party's Governance and Legal Unit in Relation to Anti-semitism, 2014–2019) was leaked. It was made during the end of Corbyn's leadership, intended for submission to the EHRC, and dated March 2020. It detailed that there was a tangible issue with antisemitism in the party, but factional hostility to Corbyn hampered efforts to tackle it. In January 2023, it was reported that the Information Commissioner's Office (ICO) were not going to take action against the Corbyn-supporting authors of the report, which leaked with unredacted confidential information, and that the Labour Party would pursue a civil case against them. This internal report led to the Forde Report.

In October 2020, following the release of the Equality and Human Rights Commission (EHRC)'s report into antisemitism in the party, Starmer accepted its findings in full and apologised to Jews on behalf of the party. The report said that there was "a culture within the party which, at best, did not do enough to prevent antisemitism and, at worst, could be seen to accept it". The report also found that the party had broken equality laws due to the handling of antisemitism complaints. Starmer added that the findings were "hard to read" and that it had "been a day of shame for the Labour Party".

Later that day, Corbyn stated that "the scale of the problem was also dramatically overstated for political reasons". He was later suspended over his response to the report. Some on the left of the party called for Corbyn's suspension to be lifted. On 14 November 2022, it was reported that the leadership of the Labour Party would not restore the whip to Corbyn, preventing him from standing for election on behalf of the Labour Party. This led to speculation Corbyn could stand for election as the Mayor of London or in his current parliamentary constituency as an independent candidate, in opposition to Labour. In March 2023, Labour's National Executive Committee (NEC) voted 22 to 12 on a motion from Starmer to prevent the Labour Party from endorsing Corbyn as a candidate for the party at the next general election.

On 17 July 2022, the Forde Report was published, having been commissioned by Starmer at the beginning of his leadership. It described how groups within Labour had sought to hinder Corbyn while leader of the Labour Party and said that during his leadership it broke into factions which supported or opposed him, though this factionalism had decreased since Starmer took leadership. The report said that groups within the party who were in support and opposition to Corbyn both sought to use allegations of antisemitism in the party during his leadership to further their political interests. The report detailed bullying, racism, and sexism within the party.

The report also said many of those within the party from whom it gathered evidence were concerned the party operated a "hierarchy of racism or of discrimination", with more resources being allocated to investigate claims of antisemitism, amid their surge and political importance, compared to other forms of discrimination. Starmer was criticised for his lack of response to the report and the problems within the party that it highlighted, in particular anti-black racism.

In February 2023, Starmer's antisemitism reforms resulted in the party no longer being monitored by the EHRC. After having previously resigned from the party in February 2019 citing the handling of antisemitism allegations in the party, former Labour MP Luciana Berger rejoined in February 2023. Berger accepted an apology from Starmer, adding that the party had "turned a significant corner".

=== Shadow Cabinet appointments ===
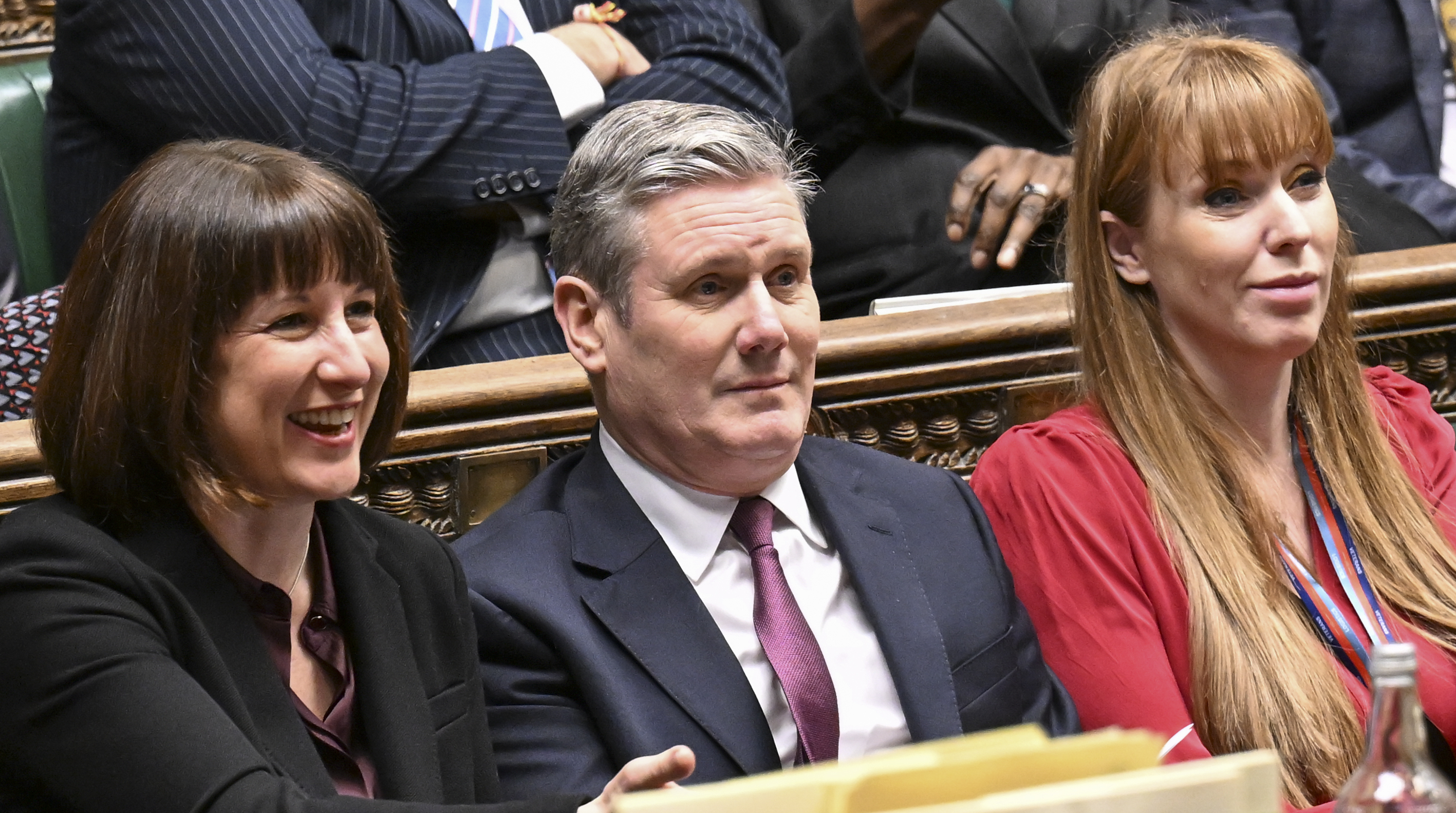
Starmer with Rachel Reeves and Angela Rayner at Prime Minister's Questions, 7 February 2024

His Shadow Cabinet appointments included MPs associated with the various wings of the party. Angela Rayner was appointed deputy labour leader and shadow deputy prime minister, while Rachel Reeves and Yvette Cooper were appointed as shadow chancellor and shadow home secretary, respectively. Miliband was appointed shadow climate change and net zero secretary. Other notable appointments included David Lammy as shadow foreign secretary and Wes Streeting as shadow health secretary. A reshuffle of the Shadow Cabinet was undertaken in September 2023, which was described by the media as being dominated by Blairites and demoting MPs on the soft left.

==== May 2021 Shadow Cabinet reshuffle ====
In the aftermath of relatively poor results in the 2021 local elections, Starmer carried out a May 2021 shadow cabinet reshuffle. Starmer dismissed Angela Rayner as Chair of the Labour Party and National Campaign Coordinator following the elections. The move was criticised by John McDonnell, former Shadow Chancellor of the Exchequer, and Andy Burnham, Mayor of Greater Manchester. The major outcome of the reshuffle was the demotion of the Shadow Chancellor, Anneliese Dodds. Rachel Reeves was appointed as the new Shadow Chancellor and Angela Rayner succeeded Reeves as Shadow Chancellor of the Duchy of Lancaster. Nick Brown was dismissed as Chief Whip and replaced by his deputy, Alan Campbell. Valerie Vaz departed as Shadow Leader of the House of Commons and was replaced by Thangam Debbonaire, who in turn was succeeded as Shadow Secretary of State for Housing by Lucy Powell. On 11 May 2021, Starmer's Parliamentary Private Secretary (PPS) Carolyn Harris resigned, which The Times reported was after allegedly spreading false rumours about the private life of Angela Rayner prior to her dismissal. Sharon Hodgson was appointed as Starmer's new PPS.

==== November 2021 Shadow Cabinet reshuffle ====
The November 2021 shadow cabinet reshuffle, which was considered a surprise, included the promotion of Yvette Cooper and David Lammy to Shadow Home Secretary and Shadow Foreign Secretary, respectively, while Miliband was moved from Shadow Secretary of State for Business and Industrial Strategy to Shadow Secretary of State for Climate Change and Net Zero. The appointment of Cooper in particular was described by some commentators as a sign of Labour further splitting from the Corbyn leadership and moving to the right. The BBC's Laura Kuenssberg and Robert Peston of ITV News said that the reshuffle aimed to "combine experience and youth" and end "the fatuous project of trying to ... placate Labour's warring factions", and instead chose "shadow ministers for their perceived ability". In the New Statesman, journalist Stephen Bush suggested that Starmer had "removed underperforming shadow cabinet ministers and rewarded his biggest hitters – but the resulting shadow cabinet looks to be less than the sum of its parts."

==== 2023 Shadow Cabinet reshuffle ====
In September 2023, Starmer reshuffled his shadow cabinet for the third time since taking over as leader. Starmer's deputy Angela Rayner received the shadow levelling up post, replacing Lisa Nandy who was demoted to the shadow minister for international development. The most senior members of the shadow cabinet remained in their positions. Rosena Allin-Khan, who was the shadow minister for mental health before the reshuffle, resigned from the Shadow Cabinet, criticising shadow Health Secretary Wes Streeting's advocacy for outsourcing the NHS to the private sector. She also said that Starmer did "not see a space for a mental health portfolio in a Labour cabinet". The reshuffle coincided with the start of the tenure of Sue Gray as Starmer's new chief of staff.

Writers from The Guardian and Politico said that the Blairite wing of the party had prospered in the reshuffle to the detriment of the soft left of the party. One shadow minister, said of the reshuffle, "It's all the Blairites" and called it "an entirely factional takeover". Starmer said that he was putting his "strongest possible players on the pitch" ahead of the upcoming general election. Tom Belger writing for LabourList described the reshuffle as a continuing of "Labour's right-ward march".

=== Other events ===
==== Beergate ====
The Beergate political controversy involved an event in Durham on 30 April 2021, attended by Starmer and Rayner, could have been in breach of COVID-19 lockdown restrictions. Starmer said that the event complied with the rules for work gatherings, with a pause for food. The police, after investigating, cleared the Labour attendees, including Starmer and Rayner of any wrongdoing.

==== Breach of code of conduct ====
In August 2022, Parliamentary Commissioner for Standards, Kathryn Stone, found that Starmer had breached the MPs' code of conduct eight times by failing to register interests on eight occasions. Stone had launched the investigation in June after complaints that Starmer had been late to register income and hospitality, and said that the breaches were "minor and/or inadvertent." A Labour spokesperson subsequently stated that Starmer had apologised, with Starmer having previously stated he was "absolutely confident" that there was "no problem."

==== Slur by Boris Johnson ====
While speaking in the House of Commons on 31 January 2022, Johnson falsely blamed Starmer for the non-prosecution of Jimmy Savile, a DJ and television personality at the BBC who was a serial child sex offender, when Starmer was Director of Public Prosecutions (DPP) in the Crown Prosecution Service (CPS). Starmer was DPP in the years immediately prior to Savile's death but there is no evidence he was involved in the decision to not have him prosecuted. Johnson was heavily criticised for the comment and his policy adviser Munira Mirza resigned three days later, saying in her resignation letter that Johnson had made "a scurrilous accusation" against Starmer. Also on 3 February, during an interview with Sky News, Johnson would not apologise for his comment and tried to defend it by stating that, in 2013, Starmer apologised because the CPS had not investigated Savile; however, Johnson then said: "I totally understand that he [Starmer] had nothing to do personally with those decisions".

On 7 February, while Starmer and his colleague David Lammy were leaving Parliament, they were ambushed by a group of people who shouted abuse at Starmer including the words "traitor" and "Jimmy Savile". Two people, a man and a woman, were arrested after a traffic cone was thrown at police officers. Johnson tweeted that it was "absolutely disgraceful" and thanked the police for acting swiftly. Shayan Sardarizadeh for BBC Monitoring said that the protest was an attempt to recreate the Ottawa "freedom convoy" protests in the UK, and noted that the activists' references to Magna Carta indicated that the protesters were members of the sovereign citizen movement. Julian Smith, the former chief whip, and Simon Hoare were among Conservatives who called for Johnson to apologise. MP Kim Leadbeater and Brendan Cox, the sister and husband of murdered MP Jo Cox, warned against politicians lending credence to far-right conspiracy theories. The following day, a Downing Street source said that Johnson still would not apologise for the slur against Starmer.

Following the incident when activists forced police to protect Starmer and Lammy extremists issued multiple death threats against Starmer and other Labour MPs. The Center for Countering Digital Hate (CCDH) sent material to the Metropolitan Police. Imran Ahmed of the CCDH stated, "Every time a violent extremist makes a threat of violence and gets away with it, the norms of those groups worsen, and others are driven to newer depths of behaviour."

==== 2022 NATO and Ukraine policy dispute ====
Shortly before the Russian invasion of Ukraine in February 2022, 11 Labour backbench MPs signed a letter by the Stop the War Coalition that accused the UK government of "sabre-rattling" and said that NATO "should call a halt to its eastward expansion and commit to a new security deal for Europe which meets the needs of all states and peoples", whilst also arguing that NATO was an aggressive organisation due to military actions taken by its members outside its borders in the past. The MPs were asked by the party whips, representatives of the leadership tasked with maintaining discipline among Labour MPs, to remove their names from the statement under threat of being expelled from the party and all quickly agreed to do so. A spokesperson for the Labour Party said that this action ensured that every Labour MP understood that their party was on the side of "Britain, Nato, freedom and democracy". At around this time, Young Labour's Twitter account was suspended after it criticised the leadership policy towards NATO. In an interview with the BBC in March 2022, Starmer was asked whether he would be hoping that MPs who backed Stop the War "won't be standing at the next election or if they do whether [he would] be fully supporting them to do so". After repeatedly being accused of not answering the question, Starmer gave the answer of "well, they are Labour MPs and of course I support them, but all of our MPs will go through a process for selection into the next election".

==== Industrial action policy disputes ====
The summer of 2022 saw significant amounts of industrial unrest. Starmer instructed members of his shadow cabinet to refrain from joining picket lines; some Labour MPs appeared on picket-lines including frontbenchers Kate Osborne, Paula Barker, Peter Kyle, and Navendu Mishra. The Labour Party's contingents in the Scottish and Welsh parliaments also took a different approach. Sam Tarry, Shadow Minister for Buses and Local Transport, was dismissed on 27 July after appearing on a rail strike picket. He said in a TV interview that workers should receive a pay rise in line with inflation though Labour policy was that pay increases should be based on negotiation. A spokesperson for the party said that "Sam Tarry was sacked because he booked himself onto media programmes without permission and then made up policy on the hoof." His dismissal was criticised by trade union leaders and Tarry wrote in an opinion piece for the i that "failing to join the striking rail workers on a picket line would have been an abject dereliction of duty for me as a Labour MP."

==== Rishi Sunak attack ads ====
A month before the 2023 local elections in April 2023, several attack ads were produced by Labour targeting Rishi Sunak and the Conservative Party's record in government as a whole, focusing on issues such as crime, the economy, and health and social care. One of these ads featured the controversial claim that Sunak did not want child sex abusers to be jailed, which referred to the Conservatives' record on prosecuting child sex abusers. The figures covered the period starting in 2010 – five years before Sunak became an MP and 11 years before he became prime minister – and ending in 2022. Other attack ads accused Sunak of being soft on gun crime and suggesting thieves should not be punished, and another referred to Sunak's wife Akshata Murty and her previously held non-dom tax status.

Labour's decision to target Sunak personally caused upset amongst current and former MPs from a wide range of parties, with Liberal Democrat leader Ed Davey saying that parties "should not have personal attacks on other politicians". Senior Conservative MP Tobias Ellwood called the attack "appalling" and said politicians "should be better than this", while former Labour Home Secretary David Blunkett said it was "deeply offensive". Journalist Andrew Marr called the attack ads "disgraceful", saying "Attack ads are fundamental to politics. But the smear campaign against Rishi Sunak is a strategic and moral error."

When asked about the controversial claim, Sunak said politicians should offer "less talk, more action". Starmer responded by backing the message "no matter how squeamish it might make some feel" by saying: "I make no apologies for highlighting the failures of this government. This argument that because they've changed the prime minister five times that somehow the PM doesn't bear responsibility for 13 years of grief for many people I just don't think stacks up." Wes Streeting said it was "perfectly reasonable to challenge a Conservative prime minister on the abysmal failure of 13 years of Conservative government".

In September 2023, another attack ad targeting Sunak was released, this time accusing him of not believing schools should be safe. The ad was released amid the government's investigation of the extent of problems with crumbling concrete, which effected dozens of schools.

==== Diane Abbott's suspension and whip restoration ====
In April 2023, after writing an article in The Observer, former Shadow Home Secretary Diane Abbott was suspended as a Labour MP pending an investigation. In the article, Abbott claimed that although "many types of white people with points of difference" such as Jewish, Irish or Traveller people can experience prejudice, they are not subject to racism "all their lives". Abbott later apologised for the article, saying that she had erroneously sent an early draft of her article. A Labour Party statement said that the comments were "deeply offensive and wrong". Starmer said that she was suspended due to anti-Semitism. The Labour Party National Executive Committee concluded its inquiry into her comments in December 2023 and issued her with a "formal warning". The Labour Party restored the whip on 28 May 2024. Abbott said she had been barred from standing as a Labour Party candidate at the 2024 general election, but Starmer later said she would be "free" to stand as a Labour candidate.

==== Neal Lawson's possible expulsion ====
In June 2023, Neal Lawson, the chair of the centre-left think tank, Compass, faced possible expulsion from the Labour Party after 44 years of membership due to tweeting in 2021 in favour of other political parties working together with Labour against the Conservatives. In response to being notified of his possible expulsion, Lawson said that the party had become obsessed with "petty tyranny" and under the leadership of Keir Starmer the party had been captured by a clique who are "behaving like playground bullies". Labour MP Jon Cruddas accused the party under Starmer of being right-wing, illiberal and of enacting a "witch-hunt", calling the decision regarding Lawson a "disgrace".

==== Gaza war ====
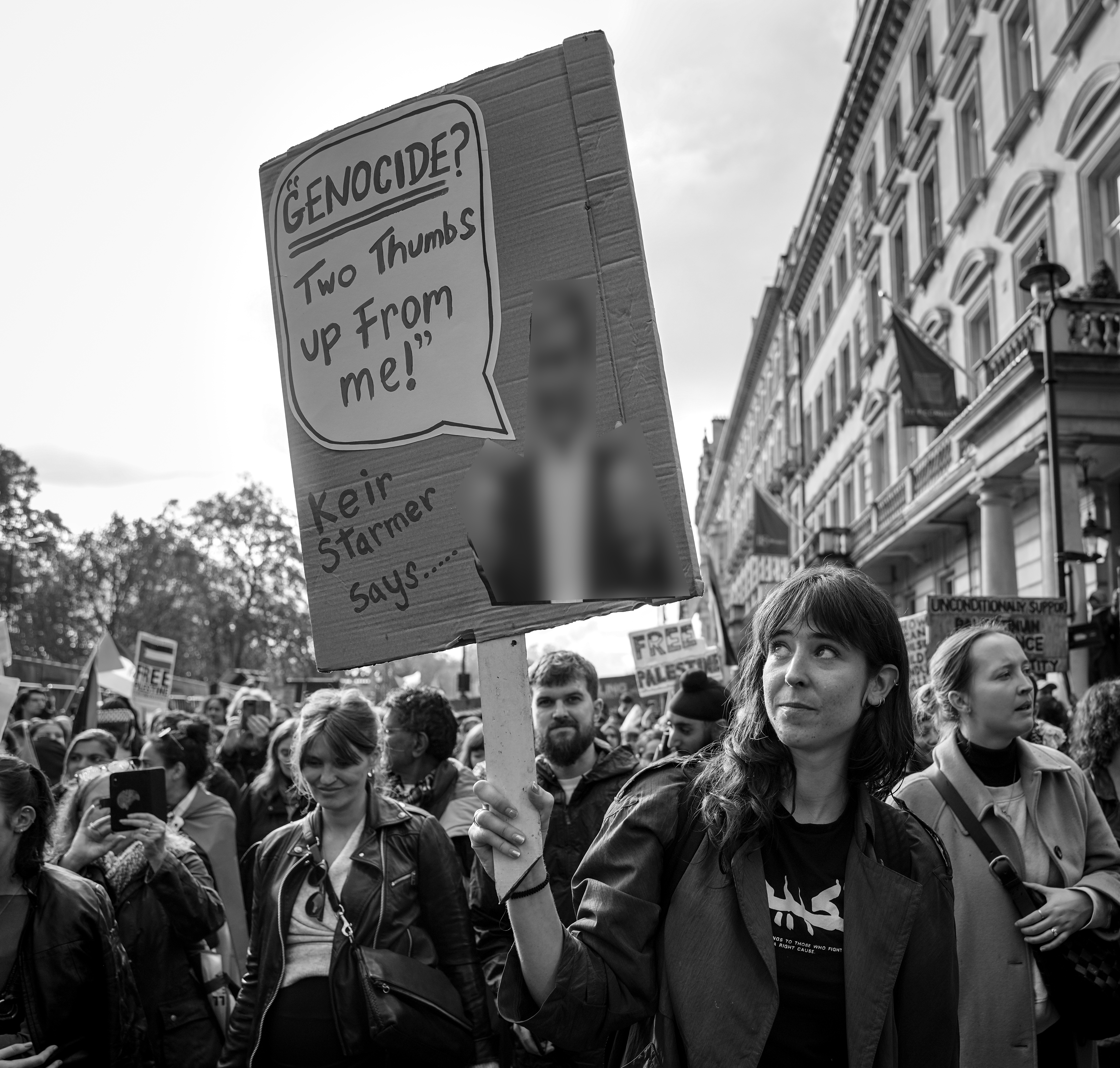
Protestor holding a sign saying Starmer supports the genocide of Palestinians during the Gaza war

In October 2023, Hamas launched a surprise attack on Israel that devolved into a war and a growing humanitarian crisis in the Gaza Strip and a strong case of ongoing genocide against the Palestinian people at the hands of Israeli forces. Starmer expressed support for Israel, condemned "terrorists of Hamas", and said, "This action by Hamas does nothing for Palestinians. And Israel must always have the right to defend her people." In an interview with LBC on 11 October 2023, Starmer was asked whether it would be appropriate for Israel to totally cut off power and water supplies to the Gaza Strip, with Starmer replying that "I think that Israel does have that right" and that "obviously everything should be done within international law". On 20 October, after criticism and resignations of Labour councillors, Starmer said that he only meant that Israel had the right to defend itself. Starmer had said that a ceasefire would only benefit Hamas for future attacks, instead calling for a humanitarian pause to allow aid to reach Gaza. As of 6 November 2023, 50 of Labour's councillors had resigned over the issue.

On 16 November 2023, Starmer suffered a major rebellion when 56 of his MPs (including ten frontbenchers) defied a three-line whip in voting for a Scottish National Party (SNP) motion proposed by Stephen Flynn to support an immediate ceasefire in Gaza. Prior to the vote, Starmer stated that Labour MPs with positions in his Shadow Cabinet would be sacked if they voted in favour of the ceasefire vote. This then led to the loss of ten frontbenchers, including eight shadow ministers. In December 2023, Starmer followed Prime Minister Rishi Sunak in changing his stance by calling for a "sustainable ceasefire" in relation to Gaza, which also came after the Foreign Secretary David Cameron's same change in position. Starmer stated his support for a "two-stage" "two-state solution". The Labour Party under Starmer suspended several parliamentary candidates and MPs, including Graham Jones, Andy McDonald, Azhar Ali and Kate Osamor, for allegedly making anti-Semitic comments about Israel during the Israel-Hamas war, or for describing its conduct as genocide. Jones said Britons who go to Israel to fight for the Israel Defense Forces "should be locked up". Osamor wrote that there was an "international duty" to remember the victims of the Holocaust and that "more recent genocides in Cambodia, Rwanda, Bosnia and now Gaza" should also be remembered. On 18 February 2024, Starmer called for a "ceasefire that lasts" and said it must "happen now", having previously declined to call for one.

==== Starmer and Sunak's PMQ exchange about transgender rights ====
In February 2024, in response to Starmer's alleged backtracking on "defining a woman" at Prime Minister's Questions, Sunak said that "in fairness, that was only 99% of a U-turn", referring to previous comments made by Starmer that "99.9% of women" do not have a penis. This was said on the same day that the mother of murdered transgender teenager Brianna Ghey was present at the Commons, and was harshly criticised by Starmer, LGBT groups (including Stonewall) and relatives of Ghey. Starmer reacted by deriding Sunak for including that in his answer while Ghey's mother was "in this chamber". In response to Ghey's father's request for an apology, Sunak said it was Starmer's linking the comments to the murder that was "the worst of politics".

Esther Ghey, who was not in the public gallery to hear Sunak's remark, later declined requests for comment adding that she was concentrating on "creating a lasting legacy" for her daughter. Both Sunak and Starmer were criticised. Sunak's response was called a joke by some media outlets, and was criticised by some opposition MPs and Conservatives. Starmer's response was criticised by minister for women and equalities, Kemi Badenoch, who said it showed Labour were "happy to weaponise" Ghey's murder.

==== General election betting scandal ====
During the 2024 general election campaign, allegations were made that illicit bets were placed by political party members and police officers, some of whom may have had insider knowledge of the date of the general election before Rishi Sunak, the Prime Minister at the time, publicly announced when it would be held. The allegations started with a report in The Guardian saying that Conservative candidate and Parliamentary Private Secretary to the Prime Minister, Craig Williams, had placed a £100 bet on 19 May 2024 that the election would be in July, three days before Sunak announced the general election to the public. In response, the Gambling Commission opened an inquiry into alleged betting offences relating to the day of the election. Later, further allegations, or admissions of political betting, were made involving police officers, Conservative members, a Labour member, and a Liberal Democrat member.

==== Free gifts and hospitality controversy ====
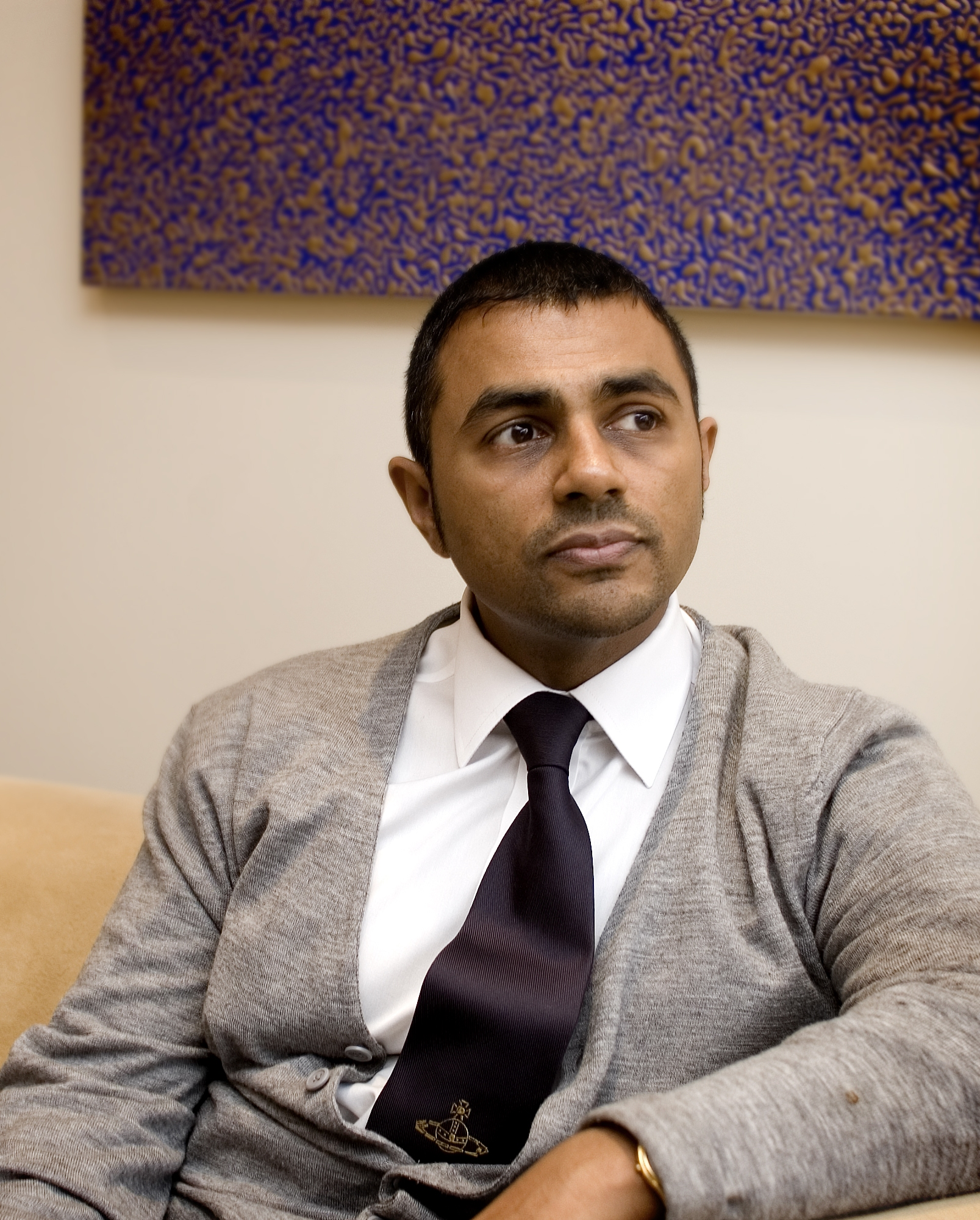
Waheed Alli, Baron Alli pictured in 2010

It was reported in September 2024 that Starmer, during his tenure as Leader of the Opposition, had accepted over £107,145 worth of gifts, benefits, and hospitality since the 2019 general election, including tickets to Arsenal F.C. matches and Taylor Swift concerts, two-and-a-half times more than any other MP. Starmer announced he would no longer accept clothes from donors. Starmer later admitted to accepting accommodation worth £20,000 from Labour donor Waheed Alli, Baron Alli between May and July 2024, stating that the offer was for somewhere his son could study peacefully for his GCSEs. The exams that year finished in mid-June.

Starmer's use of accommodation provided by Alli sparked further controversy when it was reported that a video calling for Brits to stay at home that Starmer had filmed in December 2021, during the third wave of the COVID-19 pandemic, had been filmed in a flat belonging to Alli. On 27 September The Guardian reported that Starmer had received an additional £16,000 worth of clothes as a gift from Alli in late 2023 and early 2024. Although those gifts had been declared in time, they had been declared as money "for the private office" of Starmer, and not as clothing. Starmer stated that there was a "massive difference between declarations and corruption," saying that "all MPs get gifts".

== Party management ==
=== EHRC report, exclusion of Corbyn and antisemitism reforms ===
In October 2020, following the release of the Equality and Human Rights Commission (EHRC)'s report into antisemitism in the party, Starmer accepted its findings in full and apologised to Jews on behalf of the party. The report said that there was "a culture within the party which, at best, did not do enough to prevent antisemitism and, at worst, could be seen to accept it". The report also found that the party had broken equality laws due to the handling of antisemitism complaints. Starmer added that the findings were "hard to read" and that it had "been a day of shame for the Labour Party".

Later that day, Jeremy Corbyn stated that "the scale of the problem was also dramatically overstated for political reasons". He was later suspended over his response to the report. Some on the left of the party called for Corbyn's suspension to be lifted. On 14 November 2022, it was reported that the leadership of the Labour Party would not restore the whip to Corbyn, preventing him from standing for election on behalf of the Labour Party. This led to speculation Corbyn could stand for election as the Mayor of London or in his current parliamentary constituency as an independent candidate, in opposition to Labour. In March 2023, Labour's National Executive Committee (NEC) voted 22 to 12 on a motion from Starmer to prevent the Labour Party from endorsing Corbyn as a candidate for the party at the next general election.

In February 2023, Starmer's antisemitism reforms resulted in the party no longer being monitored by the EHRC.

After having previously resigned from the party in February 2019 citing the handling of antisemitism allegations in the party, former Labour MP Luciana Berger rejoined in February 2023. Berger accepted an apology from Starmer, adding that the party had "turned a significant corner".

=== 2021 party governance changes ===
In the run up to Labour's conference in September 2021, the party announced plans to reform its governance structure with changes including the return of its older electoral college which would give MPs, members and trade unions a third of the vote each in future leadership elections. Starmer's spokespeople said that this was a way to strengthen the party's link with the trade union movement but commentators described the changes as an attempt to increase the power of MPs and trade unions at the expense of the general membership, along with being a symbolic act to draw a distinction between Starmer and Corbyn.

Starmer gave up on the electoral college after it failed to gain the support of trade unions; the party's executive committee agreed to send a series of more modest reforms to conference, including increasing the percentage of Labour MPs a candidate would need the support of to get on the leadership election ballot, banning the party's newest members from voting, and making it harder for members to deselect MPs. These changes were later passed by a small margin. The Bakers, Food and Allied Workers' Union voted to end its affiliation to Labour dating back to early in the party's history, commenting that it had "travelled away from the aims and hopes of working-class organisations like ours" under Starmer's leadership.

=== Forde Report ===
In April 2020, an internal party report on antisemitism (The Work of the Labour Party's Governance and Legal Unit in Relation to Anti-semitism, 2014–2019) was leaked. It was made during the end of Corbyn's leadership, intended for submission to the EHRC, and dated March 2020. It detailed that there was a tangible issue with antisemitism in the party, but factional hostility to Corbyn hampered efforts to tackle it. In January 2023, it was reported that the Information Commissioner's Office (ICO) were not going to take action against the Corbyn-supporting authors of the report, which leaked with unredacted confidential information, and that the Labour Party would pursue a civil case against them. This internal report led to the Forde Report.

On 17 July 2022, the Forde Report was published, having been commissioned by Starmer at the beginning of his leadership. It described how groups within Labour had sought to hinder Corbyn while leader of the Labour Party and said that during his leadership it broke into factions which supported or opposed him, though this factionalism had decreased since Starmer took leadership. The report said that groups within the party who were in support and opposition to Corbyn both sought to use allegations of antisemitism in the party during his leadership to further their political interests. The report detailed bullying, racism, and sexism within the party.

The report also said many of those within the party from whom it gathered evidence were concerned the party operated a "hierarchy of racism or of discrimination", with more resources being allocated to investigate claims of antisemitism, amid their surge and political importance, compared to other forms of discrimination. Starmer was criticised for his lack of response to the report and the problems within the party that it highlighted, in particular anti-black racism.

=== Election candidate selection process controversy ===
In October and November 2022, Starmer was accused of designing and using Labour's new selection process for parliamentary candidates to prevent Corbyn-supporting, left-wing, or disloyal prospective MPs from being able to stand at the 2024 general election.

Party members who supported Corbyn said that under Starmer's leadership, they were being targeted for exclusion by the selection process. Under the selection system, step one is to get onto a 'longlist', which will then be refined down to a 'shortlist'. BBC News says that unnamed potential candidates have said that party employees are being "tasked" to search their online activities for reasons to keep them off the 'longlist'. One unnamed Labour MP from the left of the party said of the party leadership that they were "drunk on power" and that they went "beyond anything from the Blair years". The party defended this activity saying it was for quality control purposes. John McTernan, a former advisor for Tony Blair, supported the activity, saying Labour needs to return "good MPs" with "mainstream Labour values" for the coming election adding that under Corbyn, too much "flotsam and jetsam" became Labour MPs. A Labour representative said "Due diligence is about weeding out candidates who could cause electoral damage".

On 13 November 2022, The Guardian said that under Starmer, the way the selection panel has "exerted tight control" over how candidates are selected for shortlisting had become "extraordinary". Starmer "allies" say that selection vetting needs to be tougher as there has recently been a lot of MPs "suspended, arrested or [...] embarrassed for ill-advised tweets". The Guardian added that the measures often appear to be factional even though previous scandals have not solely involved candidates from the party's left. The co-chair of Momentum, Hilary Schan, said how times were hard for the left in the Labour party, amid the "controversy over party selections" in which candidates from the left wing of the party were "excluded from shortlists". New Statesman credits Starmer's campaign director, Morgan McSweeney, with the idea of "marginalising left-wingers" using a more stringent selection process. In 2023, the paper went on to rank McSweeney as the third most influential left wing figure in the UK, describing him as Starmer's "most trusted aide".

On 27 January 2023, HuffPost reported that after an encounter with the leaders of Scottish Labour and Welsh Labour, Starmer had "been forced into a U-turn" over the candidate selection process. Scotland's Anas Sarwar and Wales's Mark Drakeford were said to be "frustrated" for not being consulted over the idea of imposing the process used in England on the Scottish and Welsh branches of the party. Following the exchange, it is reported that it was agreed that any new process would have to be agreed jointly. The fear of the proposed English system was that it was designed to prioritise candidates close to the leadership, and to block candidates on the left of the party, thus be used to "stitch up" the candidate shortlists. Starmer's aides characterised the English checks as being used to weed out candidates who may be unsuitable to stand for parliament or who may risk damaging the party's reputation.

=== Party membership numbers and finances ===
Starmer inherited a party membership of 552,835 when he replaced Jeremy Corbyn as leader in April 2020. By the time of the NEC vote seven months later, that had dropped by 56,874, more than 10%, to 495,961, but still the largest of any UK party.

By the end of 2021, membership had fallen to 432,213, a drop of more than 21% since Starmer became leader, but still more than double the membership of the Conservative Party. Momentum, a left-wing campaign group, said Starmer's "factional" leadership was to blame as it alienated trade unions. Starmer dismissed this, saying it followed the pattern of membership going up before an election and flattening off again after. Labour therefore made a £5 million loss in 2021 leading to some staff redundancies with the loss in membership fees as well as ongoing legal battles with former staff being key factors for this loss. In July 2023, it was revealed that the party's membership had fallen further to 399,195.

By the second quarter of 2022, the Labour Party received more than £10.4 million including a £3 million donation from supermarket baron David Sainsbury and a £2.2 million donation from business tycoon Gary Lubner. Labour also received £2.7 million from public donations and trade unions.

In 2023, Labour membership fell by 37,000 people, to a total of about 370,000 – the lowest in 10 years. In the first months of 2024, the party suffered another sharp drop, of 23,000, in apparent reaction to the party's pro-Israeli stance during the ongoing Gaza war and the announcement that green investment pledges would be abandoned.

== Local elections and general election ==
=== Local election results ===
Starmer considered quitting after the party's mixed results in the 2021 local elections, the first local elections of his leadership, but later felt "vindicated" by his decision to stay on, saying "I did [consider quitting] because I didn't feel that I should be bigger than the party and that if I couldn't bring about the change, perhaps there should be a change. But actually, in the end, I reflected on it, talked to very many people and doubled down and determined, no, it is the change in the Labour Party we need".

During Starmer's tenure as opposition leader, his party suffered the loss of a previously Labour seat in the 2021 Hartlepool by-election, followed by holds in the 2021 Batley and Spen by-election, 2022 Birmingham Erdington by-election and 2022 City of Chester by-election, and a gain from the Conservatives in the 2022 Wakefield by-election. During the 2023 local elections, Labour gained more than 500 councillors and 22 councils, becoming the largest party in local government for the first time since 2002. Labour made further gains in the 2024 local elections, including winning the West Midlands mayoral election.

=== 2024 general election ===
On 22 May 2024 Sunak unexpectedly announced that a general election would be held on 4 July 2024. Labour entered the general election with a large lead over the Conservatives in opinion polls, and the potential scale of the party's victory was a topic of discussion during the campaign period. In June 2024, Starmer released the Labour Party manifesto Change, which focuses on economic growth, planning system reforms, infrastructure, what Starmer describes as "clean energy", healthcare, education, childcare, and strengthening workers' rights. It pledges a new publicly owned energy company (Great British Energy), a "Green Prosperity Plan", reducing patient waiting times in the NHS, and renationalisation of the railway network (Great British Railways). It includes wealth creation and "pro-business and pro-worker" policies. The manifesto also pledged to give votes to 16-year olds, reform the House of Lords, and to tax private schools, with money generated going into improving state education.

In July 2024 Starmer led Labour to a landslide victory in the general election, ending fourteen years of Conservative government with Labour becoming the largest party in the House of Commons. Labour achieved a 174-seat simple majority and a total of 411 seats, (Note: The figure does not include Lindsay Hoyle, the speaker of the House of Commons, who was included in the Labour seat total by some media outlets. By longstanding convention, the speaker severs all ties to their affiliated party upon being elected speaker.) the party's third-best result in terms of seat share following the 1997 and 2001 general elections. The party became the largest in England for the first time since 2005, in Scotland for the first time since 2010, and retained its status as the largest party in Wales.

In his victory speech, Starmer thanked party workers for their hard work – including nearly five years of revamping and rebranding Labour in the face of Conservative dominance – and urged them to savour the moment, but warned them of challenges ahead and pledged his government would work for "national renewal":

We did it! You campaigned for it, you fought for it, you voted for it and now it has arrived. Change begins now. And it feels good, I have to be honest. Four-and-a-half years of work changing the party. This is what it is for – a changed Labour Party ready to serve our country, ready to restore Britain to the service of working people. And across our country people will be waking up to the news, relieved that a weight has been lifted, a burden finally removed from the shoulders of this great nation. And now we can look forward. Walk into the morning, the sunlight of hope, pale at first but getting stronger through the day, shining once again, on a country with the opportunity after 14 years to get its future back. We said we would end the chaos and we will. We said we would turn the page and we have. Today we start the next chapter, begin the work of change, the mission of national renewal and start to rebuild our country.
