= 2022 vote of confidence in the Conservative Party leadership of Boris Johnson =

2022 vote of confidence in Boris Johnson

2022 Conservative Party confidence vote
- 6 June 2022
- Turnout: 100% (Conservative MPs)
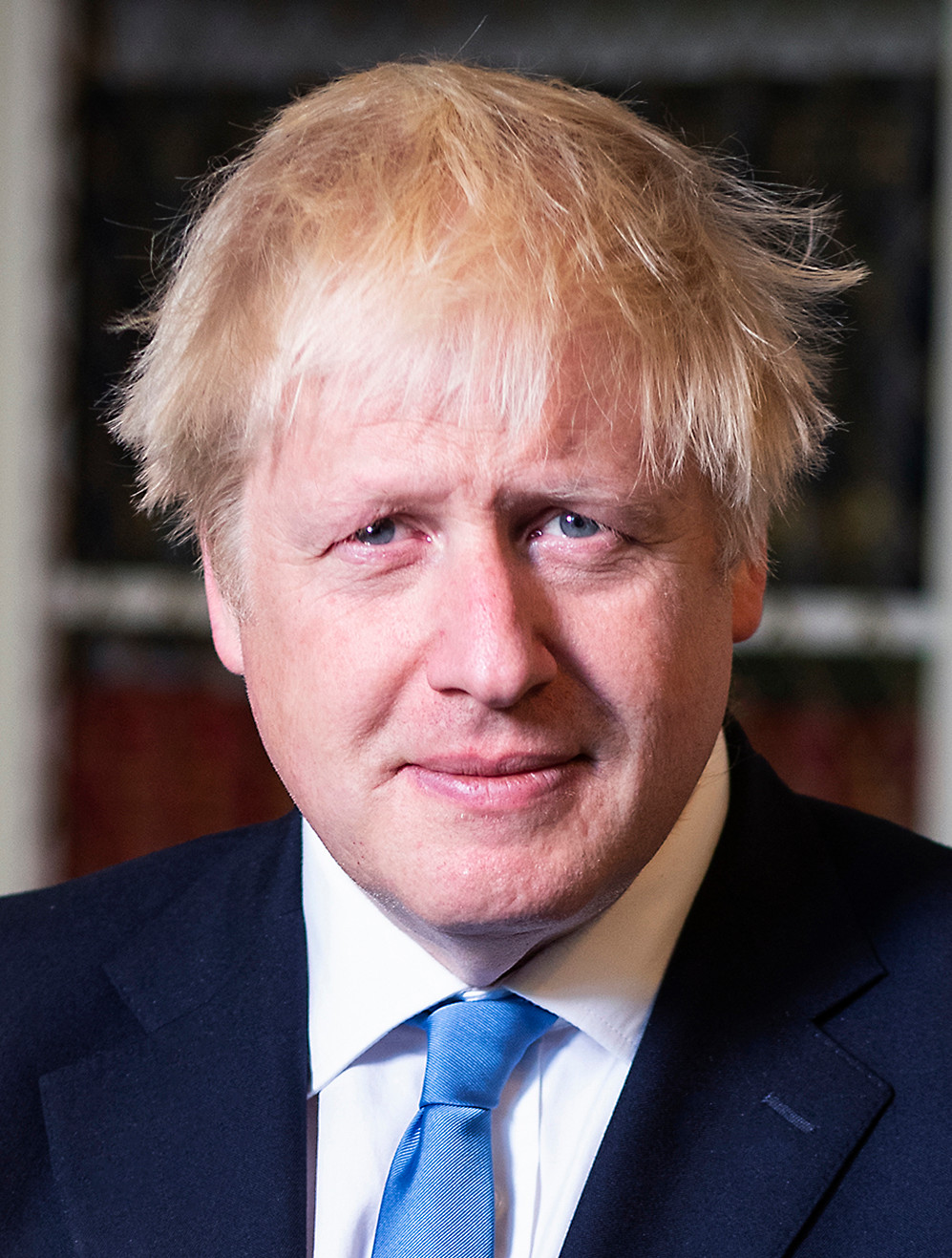

Candidate	Boris Johnson	No confidence
MPs' ballot	211 (58.8%)	148 (41.2%)
Leader before election
Boris Johnson
Elected Leader
Boris Johnson

On 6 June 2022, a vote of confidence was held amongst Conservative Party MPs on the prime minister, Boris Johnson's, leadership of their party. Johnson won the vote with the support of 211 Conservative members of Parliament, 58.8% of the total. Out of 359 MPs, 148 (41.2%) voted against him.

Despite this, just over a month later, on 7 July, following another scandal and mass resignations from his government, Johnson announced he would resign. He remained in the role until 6 September, when his successor Liz Truss was elected by members of the party, three months to the day from the vote.

== Background ==
Before the vote of confidence, Johnson's administration was criticised over a number of parties that occurred at government buildings (including the prime minister's official residence at 10 Downing Street, as well as other Downing Street offices) at a time when such meetings were prohibited due to the COVID-19 pandemic. The ensuing scandal, dubbed "Partygate", led to pressure on Johnson to resign as prime minister. Other controversies, such as the refurbishment of the prime minister's official apartment and accusations of corruption during the Owen Paterson scandal (where Conservative lawmakers attempted to delay Paterson's suspension for corruption), also increased pressure on Johnson to resign.

On 14 January it was reported that 30 Conservative MPs had submitted letters of no confidence (in Johnson) to the 1922 Committee. On 6 June 2022, following the Platinum Jubilee of Elizabeth II, the chairman of the 1922 Committee, Sir Graham Brady, announced that the threshold of 54 letters of no confidence had been met and that a vote of confidence would be held in the evening of the same day. According to party rules, he could not face another vote of confidence for 12 months. In line with agreed procedure, the vote was held by secret ballot.

The following Conservative MPs publicly said that they had submitted letters of no confidence in Johnson:

#	MP	Constituency	Announced	Ref.
1	Roger Gale	North Thanet	17 December 2021	
–	~~Douglas Ross~~	~~Moray~~	~~12 January 2022~~ (Note: Ross announced that he had withdrawn his letter in on 10 March 2022, in light of the Russian invasion of Ukraine earlier that year.)	
2	William Wragg	Hazel Grove	20 January 2022	
3	Peter Aldous	Waveney	1 February 2022	
4	Tobias Ellwood	Bournemouth East	2 February 2022	
5	Anthony Mangnall	Totnes	2 February 2022	
6	Gary Streeter	South West Devon	2 February 2022	
7	Aaron Bell	Newcastle-under-Lyme	4 February 2022	
8	Nick Gibb	Bognor Regis and Littlehampton	4 February 2022	
9	Nigel Mills	Amber Valley	13 April 2022	
10	Caroline Nokes	Romsey and Southampton North	13 April 2022	
11	Mark Harper	Forest of Dean	19 April 2022	
12	Steve Brine	Winchester	25 May 2022	
13	Stephen Hammond	Wimbledon	26 May 2022	
14	Bob Neill	Bromley and Chislehurst	27 May 2022	
15	Anne Marie Morris	Newton Abbot	28 May 2022 (Note: Marie Morris initially said that she had submitted a letter on 30 January 2022, while sitting as an independent MP after having the whip withdrawn earlier that month. She later resubmitted a letter when she had the Conservative whip restored on 28 May 2022.)	
16	Elliot Coburn	Carshalton and Wallington	30 May 2022	
17	Andrew Bridgen	North West Leicestershire	30 May 2022 (Note: Bridgen initially said that he had submitted a letter on 13 January 2022, before announcing that he had withdrawn it on 16 March 2022 in light of the Russian invasion of Ukraine earlier that year. He later announced that he had resubmitted a letter on 30 May 2022.)	
18	John Stevenson	Carlisle	31 May 2022	
19	Jesse Norman	Hereford and South Herefordshire	6 June 2022	

At that stage, former Foreign Secretary Jeremy Hunt was seen by bookmakers as the most likely next leader of the party, followed by incumbent Foreign Secretary Liz Truss. Rishi Sunak, the Chancellor of the Exchequer who had previously been seen as Johnson's most likely successor, was seen as less likely following reporting about his family's tax status and his receipt of a fine for breaking COVID-19 lockdown restrictions. A poll by the market research firm Opinium found that 59% of voters thought that Conservative MPs should vote to remove Johnson, while 28% of voters thought that they should vote to retain confidence in him. A poll by YouGov found that 42% of Conservative Party members thought that MPs should vote to remove Johnson, while 53% thought they should not. 61% of members thought that the next election would result in a Conservative-led government if Johnson remained in post, while 72% thought that a different leader would deliver a Conservative-led government.

== Result ==
A majority of Conservative MPs voted that they had confidence in Johnson to continue as party leader. 211 of the 359 Conservative MPs (58.8%) voted in support of Johnson and (41.2%) of MPs voted no confidence in him, which The Guardian described as "a larger than expected rebellion".

Compared to previous Conservative leaders, Johnson's 58.8% confidence level is lower than the 63% that Theresa May received in her 2019 vote of confidence, higher than the 45% that Iain Duncan Smith received in a 2003 vote, lower than the 66% that John Major received when he resigned as leader and stood again for leadership in 1995, and lower than the 84% share of the vote that Margaret Thatcher received, under the previous process where an MP had to challenge the leader in a ballot, and in which Sir Anthony Meyer challenged Thatcher in the 1989 leadership election.

Confidence vote of Boris Johnson
Ballot →	6 June 2022
Confidence	211 / 359 (59%)
No confidence	148 / 359 (41%)

== Reactions ==
On 6 June, Johnson called the result of the vote "extremely good" and was reported to be planning a cabinet reshuffle to reward his supporters in the vote. William Hague, former leader of the Conservatives, said the votes "show a greater level of rejection than any Tory leader has ever endured and survived". Lee Anderson, a Conservative MP, said that Johnson had been the "victim of a witch hunt led by the BBC".

According to the Conservative parliamentary group's informal rules, the only other option for Conservatives to remove him from power, within the next twelve months, is for the cabinet to ask him to resign, but the Financial Times thought this was unlikely as he has selected cabinet members for their loyalty to him, and their careers depend closely on his. His Conservative opponents did not see the result as ending their campaign against Johnson, although they had no other constitutional options to challenge him within the party. Philip Dunne, former health minister and ally of Jeremy Hunt (who lost against Johnson in the 2019 party leadership election) said "this is not over".

There was discussion among Conservative MPs, including Tobias Ellwood, of changing the 1922 committee rules to allow another challenge. Johnson's predecessor, Theresa May stepped down after she was told that if she did not, the rules would be changed.

On 27 June 2022 Johnson referred to the confidence vote, in which 41.2% of the Conservative MPs voted against him, saying "I've got a new mandate from my party which I'm absolutely delighted with ... it's done".

On 30 June, Deputy Chief Whip Chris Pincher resigned over new and historic allegations of sexual misconduct. Johnson denied he had been made aware of the historic allegations prior to his appointment of Pincher, which emerged to be false.

One month after the vote of confidence, from 5 to 7 July 2022, 62 of the United Kingdom's 179 government ministers, parliamentary private secretaries, trade envoys, and party vice-chairmen resigned from their governmental positions, culminating in Johnson's resignation on 7 July.
