= Labour Party leadership of Keir Starmer =

The Labour Party leadership of Keir Starmer may refer to:

- Keir Starmer as Leader of the Opposition (2020–2024)
- Keir Starmer as Prime Minister (2024–present)
