= July 2022 United Kingdom government crisis =

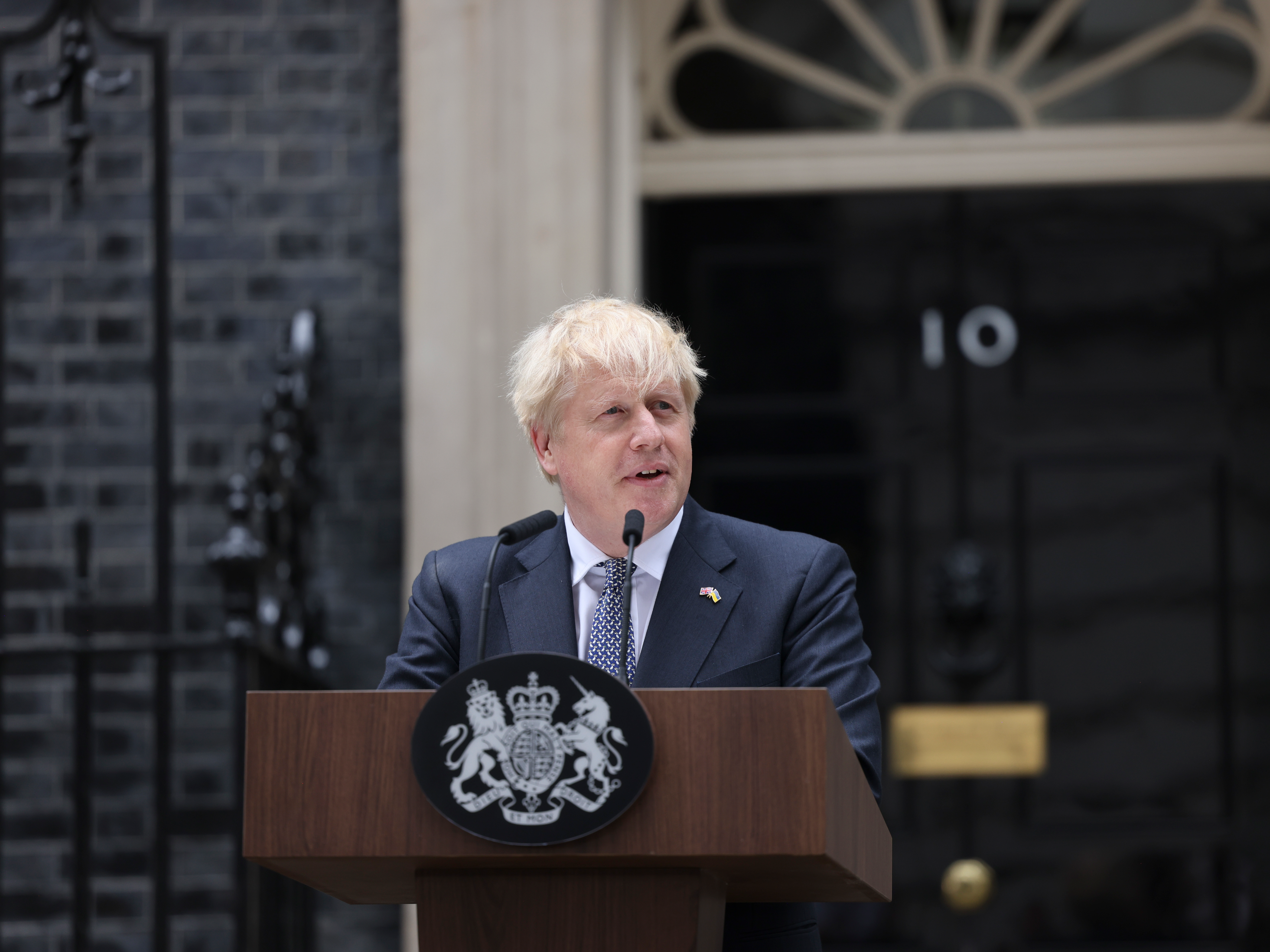
- Boris Johnson announcing his intention to resign as Conservative leader on 7 July 2022
- Date: 5–7 July 2022
- Cause: Owen Paterson scandal; Partygate scandal and alleged misleading of parliament; Conservative by-election defeats in 2021–22; Chesham and Amersham; North Shropshire; Tiverton and Honiton; Wakefield; 2022 local elections; Chris Pincher scandal
- Participants: Conservative Party MPs
- Outcome: Resignations of ministers; Resignation of Boris Johnson; 2022 British cabinet reshuffle; July–September 2022 Conservative Party leadership election; 2022 vote of confidence in the Johnson ministry

In early July 2022, 62 of the United Kingdom's 179 government ministers, parliamentary private secretaries, trade envoys, and party vice-chairmen resigned from their positions in the second administration formed by Boris Johnson as Prime Minister, culminating in Johnson's resignation on 7 July. Johnson's premiership had been considered in danger for months after several scandals, but it was the Chris Pincher scandal that was identified to have spurred on the resignations. Considered the "last straw" for the Prime Minister, the scandal arose after it was revealed that Johnson had promoted his Deputy Chief Government Whip Chris Pincher, who was publicly facing multiple allegations of sexual assault, to the position despite knowing of the allegations beforehand.

Since mid-2021, Johnson's premiership had been impacted by controversies over his actions relating to Owen Paterson's lobbying and the Partygate scandal. These, combined with impacts on electoral performance, led to the governing Conservative Party holding a vote of confidence in Johnson's leadership in June 2022, which he won, although he was politically weakened. On 5 July, following the Chris Pincher scandal, both Rishi Sunak and Sajid Javid, respectively Chancellor of the Exchequer and Secretary of State for Health and Social Care, resigned almost simultaneously. A large number of other members of the government also resigned, leading to speculation over whether Johnson would continue as prime minister. Conservative and opposition MPs, including some members of Johnson's Cabinet, called for Johnson himself to resign. Keir Starmer, Leader of the Opposition, criticised Johnson and Conservatives who remained in cabinet at Prime Minister's Questions. During the crisis, sixty Members of Parliament (MPs) had resigned from government and party positions. Johnson also dismissed Michael Gove, Secretary of State for Levelling Up, Housing and Communities, who had refused to publicly affirm his support for him.

After previously saying he would remain as Conservative Party leader to see through the party's manifesto pledges, Johnson announced on 7 July that he would resign as leader but remain as Prime Minister in a caretaker capacity until a new party leader was elected, with the results of the July–September 2022 Conservative Party leadership election being released on 5 September 2023. After the opposition called for a motion of no confidence to the government with Johnson as PM, Johnson's government called a vote of confidence in itself with no reference to the PM, which they won. On 5 September, Liz Truss was elected leader of the Conservative Party and succeeded Johnson as prime minister on 6 September 2022. Truss would resign as leader of the Conservative Party on 20 October 2022 amid another government crisis, making her the shortest-serving prime minister in British history. Truss would be succeeded by Sunak, after he won the leadership contest to replace her.

== Background ==
In June 2021, the Conservative Party unexpectedly lost the safe seat of Chesham and Amersham to the Liberal Democrats after a successful round of local elections. This was the first big defeat for both Johnson and the Conservatives since the 2019 Brecon and Radnorshire by-election, also a Liberal Democrats gain. The following month, despite the Conservatives being heavily favoured to win the Batley and Spen by-election, the seat was narrowly retained by the Labour Party, with the Conservatives' surprise loss blamed in part on a scandal that saw health secretary Matt Hancock forced to resign the weekend prior to the by-election, after admitting to breaching social distancing regulations during an extramarital affair. While the by-election defeats were generally seen as being embarrassing for the government, they were by and large not regarded as a sign of imminent danger, as the Conservatives continued to command a strong lead in opinion polls, with press coverage primarily focusing on possible challenges to Labour leader Keir Starmer by allies of previous leader Jeremy Corbyn.

In October 2021, it emerged that Conservative MP Owen Paterson had two second jobs, both based in Northern Ireland and gained through contacts gained while Shadow Northern Ireland Secretary, and both of which had involved him advocating for government contracts or changes in standards on behalf of the companies. The Commons Select Committee on Standards found that these breached paid advocacy rules and called for Paterson to be suspended from the House for thirty days, which would have triggered a recall petition. When these recommendations were voted on in the Commons, Conservative MP Andrea Leadsom attached a controversial amendment to delay Paterson's suspension and instead launch a review into the Commons Standards Process itself; the amendment passed. When it emerged that other parties would refuse to take part, this idea was dropped and the government began to prepare for a vote on the suspension. Paterson resigned on 5 November, before such a vote could occur, triggering the 2021 North Shropshire by-election, which the Liberal Democrats unexpectedly won.

In late 2021, the Partygate scandal began after details started to emerge about a number of parties held by government and Conservative Party staff in 10 Downing Street in 2020 and 2021, in violation of COVID-19 public health restrictions. In January 2022, the Metropolitan Police announced that it would open an investigation into the gatherings, and the civil servant Sue Gray was announced to be leading a Cabinet Office inquiry. Gray's final report in May 2022 described multiple events, including excessive drinking and a lack of respect shown to cleaning and security staff. She concluded that senior political and civil service leadership "must bear responsibility for this culture". Public disquiet over the events led to a decline in public support for Boris Johnson, the government and the Conservatives.

In May 2022, another round of local elections took place, resulting in big gains for the Labour Party and the Liberal Democrats, and losses for the Conservatives, including the councils of Westminster and Wandsworth which had been Conservative since the premiership of James Callaghan. In early June 2022, a vote of confidence in Johnson's leadership of the Conservative Party was held. The sudden rise in letters to Graham Brady, chairman of the 1922 Committee, which made this vote possible was partially as a result of an incident before the Platinum Jubilee National Service of Thanksgiving, where Johnson was booed by crowds outside St Paul's Cathedral. Johnson won the vote with the support of 59% of the Conservative MPs (211–148).

The Conservatives lost two seats in by-elections on 23 June 2022 in Wakefield and Tiverton & Honiton, with a 13% swing to Labour and 30% swing to the Liberal Democrats respectively. This led to the resignation of Oliver Dowden as Chairman of the Conservative Party, who said in his resignation letter that "we cannot carry on with business as usual".

In late June 2022, the Chris Pincher scandal erupted after the Conservative MP Chris Pincher resigned from his position as Deputy Chief Whip due to allegations that he sexually assaulted two men. A few days later, a number of new allegations against him emerged, including allegations that his behaviour had previously been reported to 10 Downing Street and that Johnson had ignored those allegations.

== Collapse of the government ==
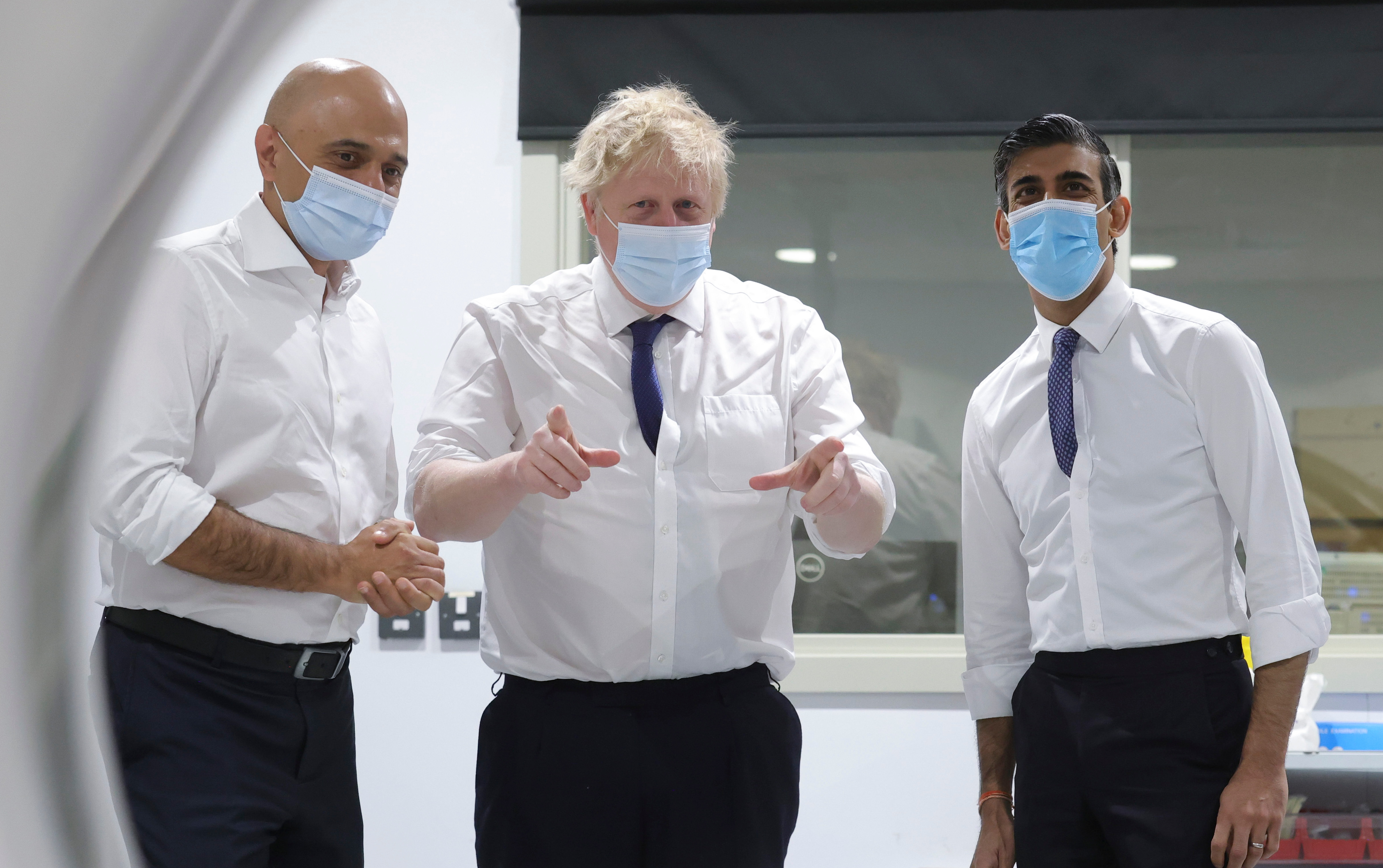
Sajid Javid (left) and Rishi Sunak (right) (the first two cabinet members to resign on 5 July) pictured with Boris Johnson (centre)

On 5 July 2022, Health Secretary Sajid Javid and Chancellor Rishi Sunak resigned following Johnson's admission that it was a mistake to appoint Member of Parliament (MP) Chris Pincher to the role of Deputy Chief Whip following allegations of sexual harassment stretching back at least twelve years. The resignations of Javid and Sunak caused numerous junior ministers and among the Parliamentary Private Secretary (PPS) to also resign, most of whom cited a lack of honesty and integrity on the part of Johnson. In the following 24 hours, 36 MPs resigned from their roles in government. This marked both the largest number of ministerial resignations in a 24-hour period since the British Empire Economic Conference in 1932, and the largest number of such resignations on record. Despite the historic mass resignation of his ministers and his own later on, Johnson stated that he had a "colossal mandate" from the public, referencing the 2019 UK general election results where the Conservative Party won the highest percentage for any party since 1979, and would not stand down immediately.

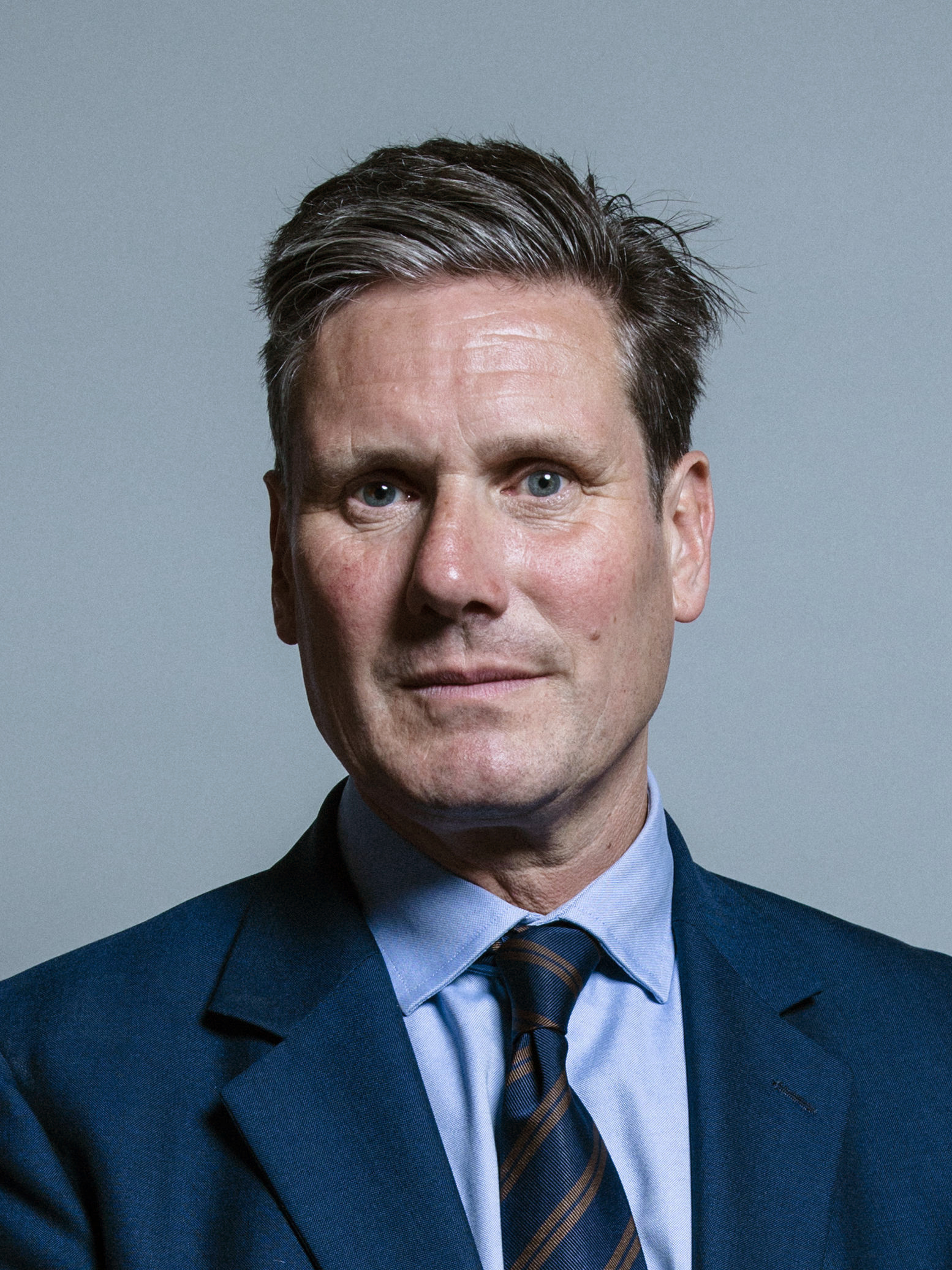
In a scathing Prime Minister's Questions quip, Leader of the Opposition Keir Starmer famously described the remaining cabinet ministers loyal to Boris Johnson as the "Charge of the Lightweight Brigade"

The following day, Johnson faced attacks from both the Opposition and Government benches during Prime Minister's Questions, during which he ruled out resigning. Keir Starmer called Johnson a "pathetic spectacle" and criticised those who remained in his cabinet, saying; "As for those who are left – only in office because no one else is prepared to debase themselves any longer. The charge of the lightweight brigade." After Tim Loughton asked Johnson the question "does the Prime Minister think there are any circumstances in which he should resign?", Johnson responded by saying "the job of a Prime Minister in difficult circumstances when he's been handed a colossal mandate is to keep going! And that's what I'm going to do!". Following the conclusion of Prime Minister's Questions, Johnson faced further questions from more MPs during a meeting of the Liaison Committee, during which it was revealed that members of the Cabinet, including newly appointed Chancellor Nadhim Zahawi and Priti Patel, the Home Secretary, had gathered inside 10 Downing Street to call on Johnson to resign. Following this revelation, other members of Johnson's cabinet, such as Nadine Dorries (Secretary of State for Digital, Culture, Media and Sport), also gathered at Number 10 reportedly to support Johnson.

It was widely reported that the 1922 Committee could change their rules in order to allow Johnson to face a second motion of no confidence, though the Committee later ruled out doing so before previously scheduled elections on 11 July. Several MPs reportedly submitted letters to the 1922 Committee expressing a loss in confidence in Johnson, and the committee's chairman Graham Brady was among those seen heading into Number 10, reportedly offering "wise counsel", which has been widely interpreted as advice to resign.

On the evening of 6 July, despite further senior ministers, including formerly loyal allies such as Patel, Michael Gove (Secretary of State for Levelling Up, Housing and Communities), and Grant Shapps (Secretary of State for Transport), reportedly urging the Prime Minister to resign, Number 10 released a statement reiterating that Johnson would not step down voluntarily. That same day, Johnson dismissed Gove for alleged "disloyalty" after he urged Johnson to resign. Later that evening, Simon Hart (Secretary of State for Wales) resigned from the cabinet, stating he had "no other option left".

Suella Braverman, Attorney General for England and Wales, joined calls for Johnson to resign but refused to resign from her position in government, citing her sense of duty, and the government's need for an attorney. She also stated she would stand in any upcoming Conservative leadership contest. Fay Jones, MP for Brecon and Radnorshire, announced that if Johnson did not step down by 7 July, she would resign from her role as PPS to the Leader of the House of Commons. Two of the parliamentary private secretaries who resigned that evening, Mike Freer (Finchley and Golders Green) and Peter Gibson (Darlington), both gay men, mentioned government policy on LGBT+ rights in their resignation letters.

Brandon Lewis, Secretary of State for Northern Ireland, resigned on the morning of 7 July. (Note: Some news outlets incorrectly reported him resigning on the evening of 6 July.) His resignation letter stated that "honesty, integrity and mutual respect" were not "being upheld" in government. Nadhim Zahawi, the newly appointed Chancellor, called for Johnson's resignation the same morning. Michelle Donelan also resigned, two days after being appointed Secretary of State for Education, making her the shortest-serving cabinet member in British history.

Constituencies of MPs who resigned or were dismissed

The resignations led to many government departments losing nearly all of their responsible Ministers. The Department for Education only had Parliamentary Under Secretary of State Baroness Barran remaining, with all other responsible ministers having resigned.

=== Support for Johnson ===
Conservative MPs who publicly expressed support for Johnson include Nadine Dorries (Culture Secretary), Jacob Rees-Mogg (Minister of State for Brexit Opportunities and Government Efficiency), Alister Jack (Secretary of State for Scotland), Conor Burns (Minister of State for Northern Ireland), Lia Nici (Parliamentary Private Secretary to the Prime Minister), Justin Tomlinson (Deputy Chairman of the Conservative Party), Peter Bone (Wellingborough MP), and Daniel Kawczynski (Shrewsbury & Atcham MP).

Justice Secretary and Deputy Prime Minister Dominic Raab and Foreign Secretary Liz Truss made no statements either in support of or in condemnation of the Prime Minister.

== Resignation of Boris Johnson ==
Late at night on 6 July, having previously said that he would "keep going" despite the resignations, Johnson made the decision that he would stand down the following morning.

On 7 July, it was announced that Johnson would make a statement, in which he would resign as Leader of the Conservative Party, with suggestions that he would also announce his intention to stay in-post as prime minister until the Conservative Party Conference in October. It was reported that Johnson had phoned the Queen in the morning, to tell her of his intention to resign.

In a July 2022 cabinet reshuffle, Greg Clark was appointed as Gove's replacement as Secretary of State for Levelling Up, Housing and Communities, and Kit Malthouse was appointed as Chancellor of the Duchy of Lancaster. James Cleverly was appointed Secretary of State for Education, replacing Michelle Donelan. Robert Buckland replaced Simon Hart as Secretary of State for Wales, and Shailesh Vara took Lewis' role as Secretary of State for Northern Ireland. Andrew Stephenson was made minister without portfolio. Johnson publicly announced his resignation as party leader and prime minister at 12:30 on 7 July, and stated he would remain as prime minister until a new party leader is elected.

At Prime Minister's Questions on 13 July 2022, Johnson said that he would leave office "with my head held high". After the opposition called for a motion of no confidence to the government with Boris Johnson as PM, Johnson's government called a vote of confidence in itself with no reference to the PM, which they won.

== Reactions ==
=== Domestic ===
Liz Truss, Foreign Secretary, made a statement following the Prime Minister's departure, calling it "the right decision" and calling for "calmness and unity". Kwasi Kwarteng, Business Secretary, described the situation as "depressing", and called for a new leader "as soon as practicable". In the 2010s, Theresa May and David Cameron also each announced their resignation as prime minister with the promise to act on it after the election of a new Conservative Party leader, with May acting on the resignation two months after the announcement.

Keir Starmer, Leader of the Opposition, criticised Johnson and Conservatives who remained in Cabinet, saying that remaining loyal to the Prime Minister meant that they did not have "a shred of integrity". He also mockingly called Johnson's new frontbench the "Charge of the Lightweight Brigade". He also said he would bring a motion of no confidence in the Conservative government if Johnson did not leave office immediately. Nicola Sturgeon and Mark Drakeford, respectively First Minister of Scotland and First Minister of Wales, called for Johnson to resign. Starmer confirmed he would table a motion of no confidence on 12 July. This was blocked by the government, as the motion also expressed no confidence in Johnson specifically, in addition to the government. A no-confidence motion in the Johnson ministry that did not mention the PM was announced on 13 July, and was debated on 18 July. The government won the vote with 347 ayes and 238 noes, with 50 MPs abstaining.

There were calls from former Conservative ministers and senior Conservative members for Johnson to step down immediately, with a proposal for Deputy Prime Minister Dominic Raab to take over until a new leader is elected. This included former Conservative Prime Minister John Major. Former Deputy Prime Minister Michael Heseltine echoed Major's opinion. Some members of the party supporting Johnson's immediate removal from office proposed that former Conservative Prime Minister Theresa May, as well as Raab, or more unlikely former Scottish Conservative leader Ruth Davidson, could be reappointed in a caretaker capacity. Some Conservative MPs feared that Johnson's behaviour was similar to Donald Trump's attempts to overturn the 2020 U.S. presidential election and his refusal to concede to Joe Biden, the 46th President of the United States. Lord Sumption, a former UK Supreme Court justice, described the crisis as a "failed constitutional coup" in which important constitutional conventions had been knowingly broken by the Prime Minister.

=== International ===
Micheál Martin, Ireland's Taoiseach, sent his best wishes to Johnson but urged a "pulling back" from the Northern Ireland Protocol Bill's unilateral action, stating that Ireland–United Kingdom relations had been "strained and challenged in recent times". Sinn Féin leader Mary Lou McDonald said Johnson "will not be missed", describing Johnson's interactions with Ireland as "wholly negative", adding that "under his leadership, we've seen an attack on the Good Friday Agreement, threat after threat to break international law".

Dmitry Peskov, the press secretary for Vladimir Putin, President of Russia, reacted positively to the news by stating that Johnson "doesn't like us. We don't like him either." Russian foreign ministry spokesperson Maria Zakharova said that the "moral of the story" was to "not seek to destroy Russia", adding that Johnson had been "hit by a boomerang launched by himself". Volodymyr Zelenskyy, President of Ukraine, expressed his sadness upon learning the news and commented: "Not only me, but also all of the Ukrainian society sympathises with you a lot." Zelenskyy thanked Johnson for his support during the 2022 Russian invasion of Ukraine.

Joe Biden, President of the United States, stated that the US and the UK would remain "the closest of friends and allies" and that "the special relationship" between the two countries "remains strong and enduring". Biden also expressed hope that Johnson's successor will remain dedicated to supporting Ukraine. White House officials refused to comment further on Johnson's departure, stating that they were "not going to comment on another government's democratic process".

== List of departures ==
Key:

Cabinet ministers and ministers that attend cabinet are listed in bold
PPS: Parliamentary Private Secretary

No. (Note: Numbers assigned do not necessarily strictly correspond to the actual order of resignation but are an approximation of the order.)	Image	MP	Constituency	Office	Resignation
**5 July**
1		**Sajid Javid**	Bromsgrove	Secretary of State for Health and Social Care	Letter
2		**Rishi Sunak**	Richmond (Yorks)	Chancellor of the Exchequer	Letter
3		Andrew Murrison	South West Wiltshire	Prime Ministerial Trade Envoy to Morocco	Letter
4		Bim Afolami	Hitchin and Harpenden	Vice Chairman of the Conservative Party for Youth	Statement
5		Saqib Bhatti	Meriden	PPS to the Department of Health and Social Care	Letter
6		Jonathan Gullis	Stoke-on-Trent North	PPS to the Northern Ireland Office	Letter
7		Nicola Richards	West Bromwich East	PPS to the Department for Transport	Letter
8		Virginia Crosbie	Ynys Môn	PPS to the Office of the Secretary of State for Wales	Letter
9		Theo Clarke	Stafford	Prime Ministerial Trade Envoy to Kenya	Letter
10		Alex Chalk	Cheltenham	Solicitor General for England and Wales	Letter
**6 July**
11		Will Quince (Note: He was later re-appointed by Johnson.)	Colchester	Parliamentary Under-Secretary of State for Children and Families	Letter
12		Laura Trott	Sevenoaks	PPS to the Department for Transport	Statement
13		Robin Walker	Worcester	Minister of State for School Standards	Letter
14		John Glen	Salisbury	Economic Secretary to the Treasury	Letter
15		Victoria Atkins	Louth and Horncastle	Minister of State for Prisons and Probation	Letter
16		Jo Churchill	Bury St Edmunds	Parliamentary Under-Secretary of State for Agri-Innovation and Climate Adaptation	Letter
17		Stuart Andrew	Pudsey	Minister of State for Housing	Letter
18		Felicity Buchan	Kensington	PPS to the Department for Business, Energy and Industrial Strategy	Letter
19		Selaine Saxby	North Devon	PPS to HM Treasury	Letter
20		Claire Coutinho	East Surrey	PPS to HM Treasury	Statement
21		David Johnston	Wantage	PPS to the Department for Education	Statement
22		Kemi Badenoch	Saffron Walden	Minister of State for Local Government, Faith and Communities and Minister of State for Equalities	Letter
23		Neil O'Brien	Harborough	Parliamentary Under-Secretary of State for Levelling Up, The Union and Constitution	Letter
24		Alex Burghart	Brentwood and Ongar	Parliamentary Under-Secretary of State for Apprenticeships and Skills	Letter
25		Lee Rowley	North East Derbyshire	Parliamentary Under-Secretary of State for Business and Industry	Letter
26		Julia Lopez	Hornchurch and Upminster	Minister of State for Media, Data, and Digital Infrastructure	Letter
27		Mims Davies	Mid Sussex	Parliamentary Under-Secretary of State for Employment	Letter
28		Duncan Baker	North Norfolk	PPS to the Department for Levelling Up, Housing and Communities	Statement
29		Craig Williams	Montgomeryshire	PPS to HM Treasury	Letter
30		Rachel Maclean	Redditch	Minister for Safeguarding	Letter
31		Mark Logan	Bolton North East	PPS to the Northern Ireland Office	Letter
32		Mike Freer	Finchley and Golders Green	Parliamentary Under-Secretary of State for Exports	Letter
33		Mark Fletcher	Bolsover	PPS to the Department for Business, Energy and Industrial Strategy	Letter
34		Sara Britcliffe	Hyndburn	PPS to the Department for Education	Letter
35		Peter Gibson	Darlington	PPS to the Department for International Trade	Letter
36		Ruth Edwards	Rushcliffe	PPS to the Office of the Secretary of State for Scotland	Letter
37		David Duguid	Banff and Buchan	Prime Ministerial Trade Envoy to Angola and Zambia	Statement
38		James Sunderland	Bracknell	PPS to the Department for Environment, Food and Rural Affairs	Statement
39		Jacob Young	Redcar	PPS to the Department for Levelling Up, Housing and Communities	Letter
40		**Michael Gove**	Surrey Heath	Secretary of State for Levelling Up, Housing and Communities	Dismissed
41		David Mundell	Dumfriesshire, Clydesdale & Tweeddale	Prime Ministerial Trade Envoy to New Zealand	Statement
42		James Daly	Bury North	PPS to the Department for Work and Pensions	Letter
43		Danny Kruger	Devizes	PPS to the Department for Levelling Up, Housing and Communities	Statement
44		**Simon Hart**	Carmarthen West and South Pembrokeshire	Secretary of State for Wales	Letter
45		Edward Argar	Charnwood	Minister of State for Health	Letter
46		Gareth Davies	Grantham and Stamford	PPS to the Department of Health and Social Care	Statement
47		James Davies	Vale of Clwyd	PPS to the Department of Health and Social Care	Letter
**7 July**
48		**Brandon Lewis**	Great Yarmouth	Secretary of State for Northern Ireland	Letter
49		Helen Whately	Faversham and Mid Kent	Exchequer Secretary to the Treasury	Letter
50		Damian Hinds	East Hampshire	Minister of State for Security and Borders	Letter
51		George Freeman	Mid Norfolk	Parliamentary Under-Secretary of State for Science, Research and Innovation	Letter
52		Guy Opperman	Hexham	Parliamentary Under-Secretary of State for Pensions and Financial Inclusion	Letter
53		Chris Philp	Croydon South	Parliamentary Under-Secretary of State for Tech and the Digital Economy	Letter
54		James Cartlidge	South Suffolk	Parliamentary Under-Secretary of State for Justice	Letter
55		**Michelle Donelan**	Chippenham	Secretary of State for Education	Letter
56		Caroline Johnson	Sleaford and North Hykeham	Vice Chairman of the Conservative Party for Women	Letter
57		Luke Hall	Thornbury and Yate	Deputy Chairman of the Conservative Party	Letter
58		Rob Butler	Aylesbury	PPS to the Foreign, Commonwealth and Development Office	Letter
59		Rebecca Pow (Note: Pow's resignation letter was officially submitted after Johnson had announced his resignation. Pow later tweeted that, while she had informed the Prime Minister of her intention to resign prior to his announcement, she had been unable to submit her letter in person due to her self-isolating with coronavirus.)	Taunton Deane	Parliamentary Under-Secretary of State for Nature Recovery and the Domestic Environment	Letter
60		Jack Brereton	Stoke-on-Trent South	PPS to the Secretary of State for International Trade	Letter
61		Richard Graham	Gloucester	Prime Ministerial Trade Envoy to Indonesia, Malaysia and the Philippines	Letter
62		Fay Jones	Brecon and Radnorshire	PPS to the Leader of the House of Commons	Statement
63		Boris Johnson	Uxbridge and South Ruislip	Prime Minister of the United Kingdom	Statement

== See also ==
- 2018 British cabinet reshuffle
- October 2022 United Kingdom government crisis
- 1940 British war cabinet crisis
- Westland affair
