= 2022 vote of confidence in the Johnson ministry =

Vote of confidence in the government of Boris Johnson

In July 2022, a motion of confidence in the second Johnson ministry was tabled in the House of Commons. The motion, debated on 18 July, was laid by the government itself after it had refused to allow time for a Labour Party no-confidence motion. The Government won the vote on 18 July, but the Prime Minister resigned in September.

== Background ==
A motion of no confidence was first proposed by Keir Starmer, the Leader of the Labour Party and Leader of the Opposition, during the July 2022 United Kingdom government crisis in which a historic number of ministers resigned from the government. This resulted in the announcement that Johnson would resign as Prime Minister of the United Kingdom after the Conservative Party leadership election, which ended on 5 September. Starmer stated that Johnson could not be allowed to remain in office, given the large-scale revolt by his own ministers. The threat of bringing a no confidence motion to the House of Commons was first made on 7 July, at the height of the government crisis.

Labour had intended to present the motion on 12 July, using the following wording: "That this House has no confidence in Her Majesty's Government while the Rt Hon Member for Uxbridge and South Ruislip remains Prime Minister." This was blocked by the government due to its explicit mention of the Prime Minister. The refusal to find time to debate the motion was described by a Labour spokesperson as a "totally unprecedented and an appalling abuse of power". On 13 July, it was announced that the government would bring a motion of confidence in itself.

During questions to the Leader of the House of Commons, Thangam Debbonaire, the Shadow Leader of the House of Commons, criticised the Government for rejecting Labour's motion with no justification in Erskine May: Parliamentary Practice and mentioning that the Conservatives put forward a very similar motion in 1965. Mark Spencer responded, defending the Government's position by saying that the Government has given Labour the confidence vote it requested with "constitutionally accepted" wording. The Government replaced the wording as follows: "That this House has confidence in Her Majesty's Government." An amendment was also tabled by Liberal Democrats leader Ed Davey to replace the wording with the following: "That this House has no confidence in Her Majesty's Government and in the Prime Minister, and demands that the Prime Minister resign from office immediately."

Tobias Ellwood, the chair of the parliamentary Defence Select Committee, was suspended from the Conservative whip on 19 July after being absent from the vote. He was temporarily given the whip back to vote in the leadership election on 20 July, but then had the whip suspended again. On 14 October 2022, Ellwood had the Conservative whip restored.

== Division ==
The motion, 'That this House has confidence in Her Majesty's Government' was passed by 347 votes to 238: a majority of 109.

Motion of confidence
Ballot →	18 July 2022
Required majority →	318 out of 635 voting MPs (Note: Based on 650 MPs minus seven Sinn Féin MPs who follow a policy of abstentionism and eight others: the Speaker Lindsay Hoyle, the Deputy Speakers (Eleanor Laing, Rosie Winterton, and Nigel Evans), who do not vote; and the tellers (for the Ayes, Chris Heaton-Harris and Michael Tomlinson, and for the Noes, Mary Glindon and Taiwo Owatemi), whose votes are not taken into account (total 15).)
Ayes: • Conservative (340); • DUP (6); • Independent (1)	347 / 635
Noes: • Labour (181); • SNP (37); • Lib Dem (12); • Plaid Cymru (3); • Alliance (1); • Green (1); • SDLP (1); • Independent (2)	238 / 635
Abstentions: • Labour (16); • Conservative (14); • SNP (7); • Alba (2); • DUP (2); • Lib Dem (2); • SDLP (1); • Independent (6)	50 / 635
Sources: Hansard

== See also ==
- 2019 vote of confidence in the May ministry
- 2022 vote of confidence in the Conservative Party leadership of Boris Johnson
- Confidence motions in the United Kingdom
- List of votes of no confidence in British governments
- 2024 United Kingdom general election
