= Chris Pincher scandal =

2022 political controversy in the United Kingdom

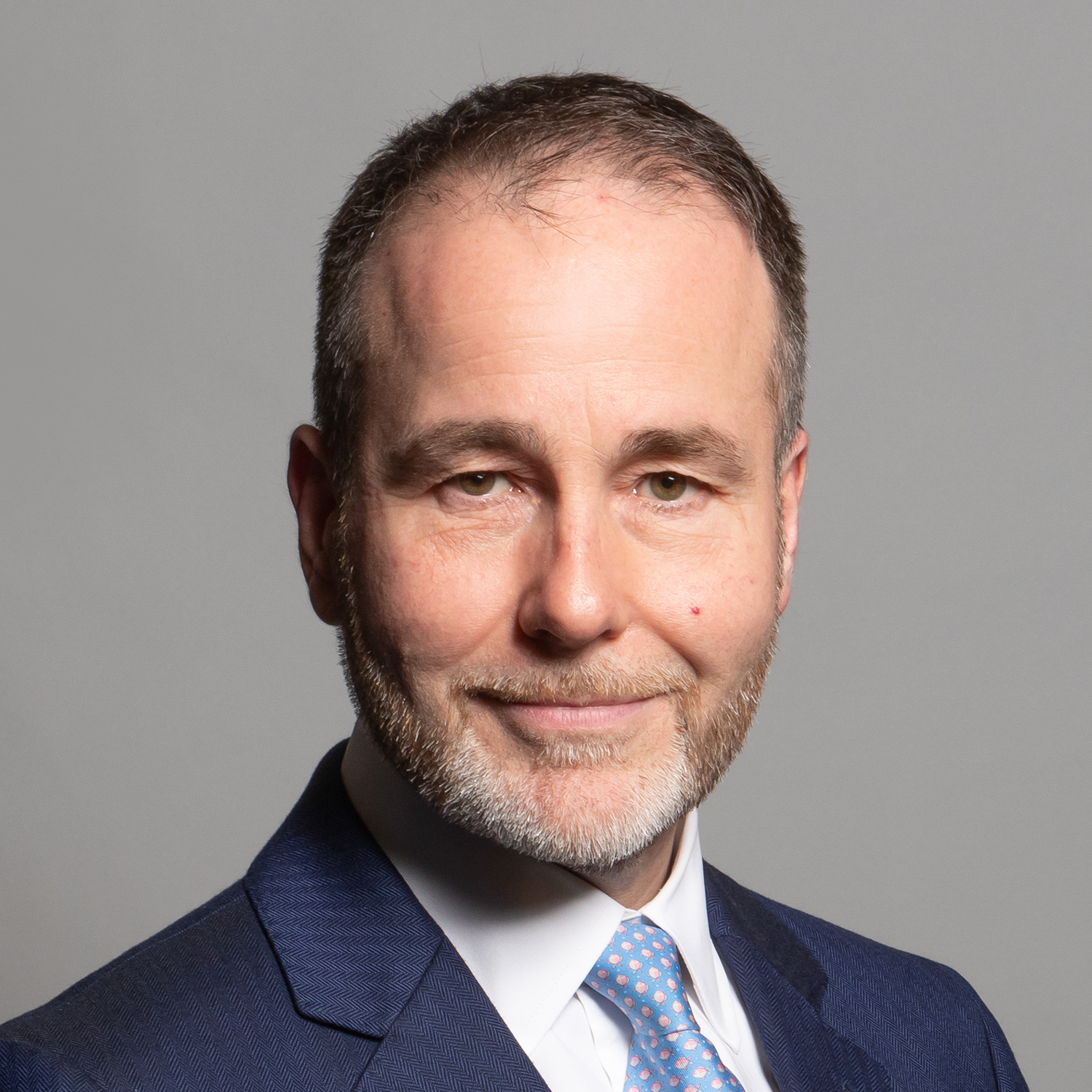
Chris Pincher, at the centre of the scandal over accusations of sexual misconduct

The Chris Pincher scandal was a political controversy in the United Kingdom related to allegations of sexual assault and misconduct by the former Conservative Party Deputy Chief Whip, Chris Pincher. In early July 2022, allegations of Pincher's misconduct emerged, including allegations that pre-dated his appointment as Deputy Chief Whip. The government initially denied that, at the time of Pincher's appointment, Prime Minister Boris Johnson had any knowledge of any specific complaints about Pincher of a similar nature. Johnson later had to admit that that was not the case, raising questions about the earlier denials and why Johnson nevertheless had chosen to appoint him as Deputy Chief Whip.

The scandal sparked a major crisis for Johnson's government, with ministers, and a larger number of government staff, resigning on 5–7 July 2022, followed by Johnson's announcement on 7 July that he would resign as party leader. Following a Parliamentary Standards Commission report released in July 2023 that recommended Pincher be suspended from the service of the House of Commons for 8 weeks, Pincher appealed the verdict and lost his appeal in September 2023, upon which he resigned his seat in Parliament.

== Background ==
Chris Pincher had served as Member of Parliament (MP) for Tamworth since 2010 as a member of the Conservative Party. In February 2022, Pincher was appointed as Deputy Chief Whip by Boris Johnson.

== Incidents ==
=== 2017 incident ===
On 5 November 2017, Pincher resigned as Comptroller of the Household (Assistant Whip) and voluntarily referred himself to the Conservative Party's complaints procedure and the police, as part of the 2017 Westminster sexual misconduct allegations. He was accused of sexual assault by former Olympic rower and Conservative candidate Alex Story.

In 2017, Story alleged that he had been the subject of unwanted sexual advances from Pincher in 2001, when Pincher invited Story to his flat, where Pincher massaged his neck and talked about his "future in the Conservative Party", before changing into a bathrobe. Recounting the episode, Story said that Pincher's advances had made him seem like a "pound shop Harvey Weinstein". (Note: In 2017, the American film producer Harvey Weinstein had been accused of rape, sexual assault and sexual abuse, leading to the #MeToo movement against sexual abuse, sexual harassment, and rape culture; "pound shop" is a reference to British high street discount stores such as Poundland.) Pincher said that "I do not recognise either the events or the interpretation placed on them" and that "if Mr Story has ever felt offended by anything I said then I can only apologise to him". Pincher was also accused of "touching up" former Labour MP Tom Blenkinsop, who told him to "fuck off". On 23 December 2017, the Conservative Party's investigating panel determined that Pincher had not breached the code of conduct.

=== June 2022 incident ===
Pincher resigned as a Government Deputy Chief Whip on 30 June 2022, saying he had "drunk far too much" the night before at the Carlton Club, a private members' club, in St James's, London, and having "embarrassed myself and other people". It was alleged that he sexually assaulted two men. Labour's deputy leader Angela Rayner said that "the latest episode" showed that standards in public life had dropped under Boris Johnson. Rayner maintained Johnson should explain why Pincher was made a parliamentary whip and how he could stay a Conservative MP. There were calls, from unnamed Conservative MPs, for a by-election to be held in Pincher's seat, (Note: This could only happen if Pincher chose to resign as an MP, was subject to a successful recall petition, or was disqualified as an MP, such as by receiving a custodial sentence of longer than a year.) as the events were considered "much worse" than when the former Conservative MP Neil Parish was caught watching pornography in the House of Commons earlier in the year. Labour Shadow Home Secretary Yvette Cooper said the full truth was needed about events and allegations, asking for the whip to be withdrawn from Pincher as a start, and saying that standards in public life were involved. Liberal Democrat Wendy Chamberlain said the allegations were so serious it was hard to see how Pincher could stay an MP. She called for a thorough investigation and for Pincher to lose the Conservative whip.

He was suspended as a Conservative MP, but it was reported that he would retain his seat in parliament as an 'independent' member of it. Rayner said Johnson had been "dragged kicking and screaming into taking any action at all." Shadow Minister of State at the Cabinet Office Baroness Chapman of Darlington said what Johnson knew when he appointed Pincher, who is a party ally, as whip is unclear. "We want to know who knew what and when and why those decisions were made the way they were. I don't think anybody in Westminster believes that Boris Johnson did not know about the allegations about Mr Pincher." BBC News reported that "Two police forces investigated allegations of sexual assault by a man believed to be the MP Christopher Pincher."

=== Further allegations in July 2022 ===
On 3 July 2022, six new allegations against Pincher emerged, involving behaviour over a decade. Three complaints were that Pincher made unwanted advances against other MPs, one in a bar at the House of Commons and one in Pincher's parliamentary office. One complainant reportedly gave Downing Street details in February and expressed concerns over Pincher becoming a whip in charge of other MPs' welfare. Pincher maintained he had no intention of resigning as an MP.

Johnson allegedly referred to Pincher as "handsy" and Dominic Cummings said Johnson joked about him being "Pincher by name, pincher by nature" in 2020. Labour MP Jonathan Reynolds said: "I think we've got to acknowledge what the consistent problem is and it is a Conservative party that repeatedly chooses to do what is politically expedient over what is right. It's clear from what we know this morning that Chris Pincher should never have been put back into the whip's office."

Ministers initially said that Johnson was unaware of any specific complaints against Pincher when he was appointed as deputy chief whip. Later, Downing Street said Johnson was aware at the time of media reports and allegations that were "either resolved or did not progress to a formal complaint". The BBC subsequently reported that an official complaint and subsequent investigation into Pincher, while he was at the Foreign Office (July 2019 to February 2020), had confirmed his misconduct, and that Johnson had been made aware of the matter at that time. Sir Simon McDonald, former Permanent Under-Secretary of State for Foreign Affairs, later said that the prime minister had been briefed "in person" about Pincher in a letter described in a Guardian editorial as an "extraordinary, devastating intervention", saying about the denial by 10 Downing Street: "This is not true." McDonald said that in the summer of 2019, a group of officials had "complained to me about Mr Pincher's behaviour. In substance, the allegations were similar to those made about his behaviour at the Carlton Club."

The treatment of alleged victims was also subject to controversy when it emerged that one of Pincher's alleged victims was asked about their sexuality by the Assistant Government Whip Sarah Dines. Upon being asked if he was gay, the alleged victim replied "What's that got to do with it? But yes, I am." She responded "Well, that doesn't make it straightforward." Dines was criticised for asking such a question, and for her response.

Tamworth Conservative deputy mayor Daniel Cook said Pincher sexually assaulted him in 2005 and 2006, and that he had lodged a complaint with the Conservative Party.

== Subsequent government crisis ==
In an interview with BBC's Chris Mason on 5 July 2022, Johnson said he had appointed Pincher to a government position and had been told about a misconduct complaint against him. Johnson said he had made a "bad mistake" by not acting on the information. Chancellor of the Exchequer Rishi Sunak and Secretary of State for Health and Social Care Sajid Javid resigned minutes later. The vice-chair of the Conservative Party, Bim Afolami resigned the same day along with Saqib Bhatti, Jonathan Gullis and Nicola Richards from their positions as parliamentary private secretaries. Alex Chalk also resigned as Solicitor General for England and Wales.

The following day Will Quince resigned as Parliamentary Under-Secretary of State for Children and Families. Shortly after, John Glen announced his resignation as Economic Secretary to the Treasury. Stuart Andrew also resigned as the Minister of State for Housing. There had been 60 resignations of MPs from government positions, 30 by ministers, and Michael Gove had been dismissed, by the middle of 7 July. More ministers resigned on 6 July 2022 than had ever before resigned on a single day. On 7 July, following further resignations, Johnson resigned as leader of the Conservative Party, but remained in office as Prime Minister until 6 September, upon the election of his successor, Liz Truss.

== Standards Committee investigation ==
The Standards Commissioner investigated whether Pincher harmed the House of Commons by "causing significant damage" to its reputation. He then sent his report to the Commons Select Committee on Standards, who could either change or approve that recommendation.

On 6 July 2023, the Committee recommended an 8-week suspension. Pincher appealed their decision, but lost the appeal in September 2023. Before this went to a vote of all MPs, Pincher resigned his seat.

== See also ==
- List of political scandals in the United Kingdom
