= Prime Ministerial Trade Envoy =

Position in British foreign policy

United Kingdom Trade Envoy (formerly Prime Minister's Trade Envoy) is a position in British foreign policy, within the Department for International Trade since 2016, and formerly with the UK Trade & Investment government department from 2003 to 2016.

Trade Envoys are appointed by the Prime Minister in order to promote British business and trade interests abroad. The Special Representative for International Trade and Investment is a currently dormant position previously held by a member of the British royal family, who had the responsibility of representing the Sovereign for trade purposes. Following the 2012 Cabinet reshuffle, Ken Clarke was made a roving trade envoy, focusing on promoting British expertise to emerging economies, in particular China and Brazil.

Between September 2012 and November 2013, Lord Marland served as the Prime Minister's trade envoy. Upon his suggestion, and in collaboration with the Foreign and Commonwealth Office, the post was expanded in November 2012, when David Cameron announced the creation of eight new trade envoys to selected high-growth and developing markets. Additional representatives of the British government were appointed in March 2014 following the success of the initial programme. On 23 August 2021 a further set of envoys were announced, including prominent Brexiteers Lord Botham and Kate Hoey. The appointment of Ian Botham as a Prime Ministerial Trade Envoy was viewed by some people as unexpected, as he has no experience of economic or trade matters. When he was first appointed to the House of Lords, Botham had said that he would join discussions "when they are debating something I know about – like sport or the countryside", but that there was "[n]ot much point if it’s a trade deal with Japan".

In January 2025, Business Secretary Jonathan Reynolds appointed 32 trade envoys, covering 79 markets.

== Current Trade Envoys ==
Region	Portfolio	Name	Party	Start
Africa	Anglophone West Africa (Nigeria and Ghana) (formerly Nigeria)	Florence Eshalomi; MP for Vauxhall and Camberwell Green	Labour	28 January 2025
Africa	East Africa	Kate Osamor; MP for Edmonton and Winchmore Hill	Labour Co-op	28 January 2025
Africa	Francophone West Africa (formerly Morocco and Francophone West Africa)	Ben Coleman; MP for Chelsea and Fulham	Labour	28 January 2025
Africa	Horn of Africa (formerly Ethiopia)	The Baroness Ramsey of Wall Heath; Life peer	Labour	26 January 2026
Africa	North Africa (Egypt and Algeria)	Yasmin Qureshi; MP for Bolton South and Walkden	Labour	28 January 2025
Africa	South Africa and Mauritius (formerly Southern Africa)	Calvin Bailey; MP for Leyton and Wanstead	Labour	28 January 2025
Oceania	Australia	The Lord Spellar; Life peer	Labour	28 January 2025
Oceania	New Zealand	Carolyn Harris; MP for Neath and Swansea East	Labour	28 January 2025
East and Southeast Asia	Indonesia and ASEAN	Naz Shah; MP for Bradford West	Labour	28 January 2025
East and Southeast Asia	Japan	Sharon Hodgson; MP for Washington and Gateshead South	Labour	28 January 2025
East and Southeast Asia	Malaysia, Philippines, Singapore and Brunei	George Freeman; MP for Mid Norfolk	Conservative	28 January 2025
East and Southeast Asia	South Korea	John Slinger; MP for Rugby	Labour	28 April 2026
East and Southeast Asia	Taiwan	The Lord Faulkner of Worcester; Life peer	Labour	28 January 2025
East and Southeast Asia	Thailand, Vietnam, Cambodia and Laos	Matt Western; MP for Warwick and Leamington	Labour	28 January 2025
South Asia	Bangladesh	The Baroness Winterton of Doncaster; Life peer	Labour	28 January 2025
South Asia	Pakistan	Catherine West; MP for Hornsey and Friern Barnet	Labour	26 January 2026
South Asia	Sri Lanka	The Lord Hannett of Everton; Life peer	Labour	28 January 2025
West and Central Asia	Azerbaijan and Central Asia	The Lord Alderdice; Life peer	Liberal Democrats	28 January 2025
West and Central Asia	Israel	The Lord Austin of Dudley; Life peer	Non-affiliated	5 October 2020
West and Central Asia	Jordan, Kuwait and Palestine	The Lord McNicol of West Kilbride; Life peer	Labour	28 January 2025
West and Central Asia	Türkiye	Daniel Zeichner; MP for Cambridge	Labour	26 January 2026
Europe	France	Chris Murray; MP for Edinburgh East and Musselburgh	Labour	26 January 2026
Europe	Germany	Feryal Clark; MP for Enfield North	Labour	26 January 2026
Europe	Italy	Catherine McKinnell; MP for Newcastle upon Tyne North	Labour	26 January 2026
Europe	Switzerland and Liechtenstein	David Pinto-Duschinsky; MP for Hendon	Labour	28 January 2025
Europe	Ukraine	Alex Sobel; MP for Leeds Central and Headingley	Labour Co-op	28 January 2025
North America	Argentina, Paraguay and Uruguay (formerly Southern Cone)	Fabian Hamilton; MP for Leeds North East	Labour	28 January 2025
North America	Central America	Jessica Morden; MP for Newport East	Labour	28 January 2025
North America	Commonwealth Caribbean	Paulette Hamilton; MP for Birmingham Erdington	Labour	28 January 2025
North America	Mexico	Dan Carden; MP for Liverpool Walton	Labour	28 January 2025
South America	Andean	The Lord Liddle; Life peer	Labour	28 January 2025
South America	Brazil	The Lord Evans of Sealand; Life peer	Labour	14 March 2025
