= Downing Street refurbishment controversy =

2021 British political controversy

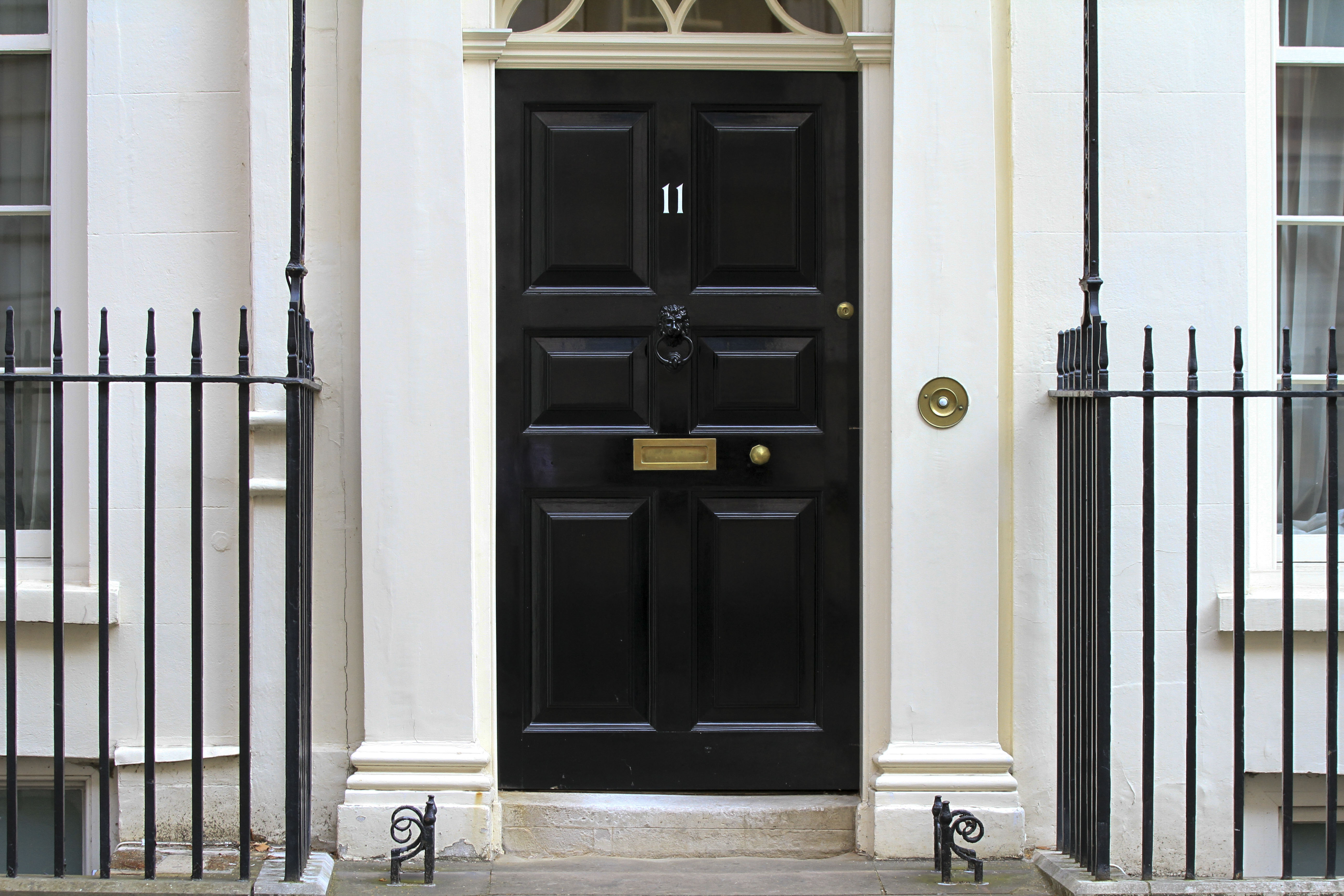
Photograph of the entrance to 11 Downing Street

The financing of the 2020 refurbishment of the flat above 11 Downing Street, the official residence of the British Chancellor of the Exchequer, became the subject of a controversy in 2021 when allegations were made in the press as to whether an undisclosed loan was used initially to help finance it. An Electoral Commission inquiry found that the Conservative Party had not accurately reported donations to the party and imposed a £17,800 fine on the party. The commission also said that the full cost of the works had been repaid in full in March 2021. The Conservative Party had said at the time that the Prime Minister had met the full cost of the works.

== Background ==
Traditionally, the British Prime Minister resides at 10 Downing Street and the Chancellor resides at 11 Downing Street. However, starting with Tony Blair there has been a reversal of this tradition, as the private residential apartment above 11 Downing Street is larger than the one above 10 Downing Street. Following his election in 2019, Boris Johnson and his girlfriend Carrie Symonds decided to reside at Number 11. Johnson hired Soane Britain, an interior design company headed by Lulu Lytle, to redecorate the apartment. Refurbishment began in April 2020, whilst Johnson was hospitalised with COVID-19.

The Prime Minister receives an annual allowance of £30,000 to maintain and furnish his private residence above 11 Downing Street. Any expenses above this amount must be covered by the Prime Minister himself. Johnson's renovations in 2020 cost £112,549. The Ministerial Code requires members of parliament to report loans and donations to the Electoral Commission within 28 days. No such reports for the financing of the refurbishment were submitted by May 2021.

== Allegations ==
In April 2021, the Prime Minister Boris Johnson's former aide, Dominic Cummings, made allegations that the prime minister had arranged for donors to "secretly pay" for renovations on the private residence at 11 Downing Street. On 23 April 2021, Cummings published a statement on his blog that the plans were "unethical, foolish, possibly illegal" and "almost certainly broke the rules on proper disclosure of political donations if conducted in the way he intended".

Dominic Grieve, former Attorney-General and Conservative Party MP, described Johnson as a "vacuum of integrity" and called on Johnson to explain how the refurbishments were paid for. Douglas Ross, leader of the Scottish Conservatives, said that Johnson should resign if the investigations find he has broken the Ministerial Code over the flat renovations.

== Rebuttals ==
On 23 April 2021, Lord True, Minister of State for the Cabinet Office said in a written answer in the House of Lords that "any costs of wider refurbishment in this year have been met by the prime minister personally".

On 28 April 2021, Johnson insisted he had not broken any laws over the refurbishment and had met the requirements he was obliged to meet in full. During Prime Minister's Questions, Sir Keir Starmer, the then Leader of the Opposition, also specifically asked "Who initially paid for the redecoration of his Downing Street flat?" and Johnson responded "I paid for Downing Street's refurbishment personally, Mr. Speaker."

== Investigations ==
On 27 April 2021, Johnson asked the Cabinet Secretary, Simon Case, to hold a review of how the refurbishment was paid for. On 28 April 2021, the Electoral Commission announced it had opened a formal investigation into the allegations.

=== Lord Geidt's report ===
Lord Geidt was appointed by Boris Johnson as the Independent Adviser on Ministers' Interests in April 2021. On 28 May 2021, Lord Geidt published a report on the allegations, in an annexe to the register of interests. The report concluded that Johnson did not breach the Ministerial Code and that no conflict, or reasonably perceived conflict, of interest arose. However, Lord Geidt expressed that it was "unwise" for Johnson to have proceeded with refurbishments without "more rigorous regard for how this would be funded". Angela Rayner, Deputy Leader of the Labour Party, wrote to Lord Geidt asking for evidence of the lack of conflict of interest and said that it was "frankly scarcely believable" that Johnson did not know who was funding the refurbishments.

In November 2021, it was reported that academic staff at King's College, London, where Lord Geidt held a position as Council chair, wrote an open letter complaining that Lord Geidt had undisclosed or unmanaged conflicts of interest, namely failing to disclose that he had worked for the Sultan of Oman when KCL had "multiple partnerships" with Oman state bodies, and had failed to manage the conflicts in Geidt holding positions at BAE Systems and Schroders when the KCL endowment fund had investments in those companies.

=== Electoral Commission report ===
The Electoral Commission reported on 9 December 2021 that it found that the Conservative Party had failed to follow the law in not accurately reporting donations to the party from Lord Brownlow and imposed a £17,800 fine on them. The Herald say the commission's report outlines how in March all the money paid by Brownlow and his company had been reimbursed as had payments made by the Conservative Party and Cabinet Office. Downing Street had said at the time that the full cost of the works had been met personally by the Prime Minister. Following the publication of the report, The Guardian reported that Johnson had been accused of misleading Lord Geidt during his investigation due to apparent inconsistencies between the reports. Johnson had told Geidt that he did not know who had paid for the refurbishments until the story was reported in the media in February 2021, whereas the Electoral Commission found that he had messaged Lord Brownlow asking for extra funds in November 2020. Downing Street denied that there was any inconsistency stating that Johnson only contacted Brownlow in his role as the head of a blind trust collecting donations, but was not aware that Brownlow was also the source of the donations. Labour MP Margaret Hodge wrote to the Parliamentary Standards Commissioner, Kathryn Stone asking her to investigate.

== See also ==
- 2021 in United Kingdom politics and government
- Premiership of Boris Johnson
