= 2021 in United Kingdom politics and government =

== Events ==
=== January ===
- 8 January – Kwasi Kwarteng is appointed Secretary of State for Business, Energy and Industrial Strategy, replacing Alok Sharma who became the new President for COP26. Kwarteng is replaced as Minister of State for Business, Energy and Clean Growth by Anne-Marie Trevelyan, the former Secretary of State for International Development. He also became the first black politician of any party to have been appointed Secretary of State.
- 11 January – James Brokenshire takes a leave of absence as Minister for Security.
- 11 January – Michelle Ballantyne becomes the Leader of Reform UK Scotland.
- 21 January – Former Brexit Party Member of the European Parliament Robert Rowland dies in a diving accident.
- 23 January – Paul Davies resigns as leader of the Welsh Conservatives following a possible breach of COVID-19 regulations. Darren Miller also resigns from the Conservative front bench over the same issue.
- 24 January – Andrew RT Davies is appointed leader of the Welsh Conservatives following a short discussion between Conservative Senedd members.

=== February ===
- 3 February – Neale Hanvey is appointed as the Scottish National Party's Shadow Minister for COVID Vaccine Deployment.
- 6 February – Neale Hanvey is sacked from the Frontbench Team of Ian Blackford.
- 26 February – A Supreme Court ruling agrees unanimously against a legal challenge made by Shamima Begum.
- 27 February – Anas Sarwar defeats Monica Lennon in the 2021 Scottish Labour leadership election.

=== March ===
- 2 March – The following ministerial appointments are made: Suella Braveman is designated as a Minister on Leave, Michael Ellis replaces her as acting Attorney General for England and Wales and Advocate General for Northern Ireland. Lucy Frazer replaces Ellis as Solicitor General for England and Wales, and joins the Privy Council.
- 9 March – Metropolitan police officer Wayne Couzens is arrested for the murder of Sarah Everard. He was an officer within the Diplomatic Services unit. He had also previously worked in other government departments. He is later sentenced to life.
- 10 March – Patrick Grady MP resigns as SNP Chief Whip.
- 11 March – A by-election was held in the ward of Aird and Loch Ness to elect one candidate to win a seat on the Highland Council.
- 16 March – Labour MP for Hartlepool Mike Hill resigns from the House of Commons due to his employment tribunal later in the year following allegations of sexual harassment and victimisation.
- 18 March – A by-election was held in the ward of Helensburgh and Lomond South to elect one candidate to win a seat on Argyll and Bute Council.
- 23 March – The Committee on the Scottish Government Handling of Harassment Complaints of the Scottish Parliament releases its final report.
- 26 March – The public launch of the Alba Party, founded by former Scottish National Party leader Alex Salmond.
- 27 March – A number of defections to the Alba Party from the Scottish National Party; sitting MPs Kenny MacAskill and Neale Hanvey. Former MP Corri Wilson also defects.
- 27 March – A number of parliamentarians have sanctions placed on them by China; MPs Iain Duncan Smith, Nusrat Ghani, Tim Loughton, Tom Tugendhat, Neil O'Brien and peers Baroness Kennedy and Lord Alton, who are all members of the Inter-Parliamentary Alliance on China.

=== April ===
- 13 to 15 April – 2021 Lord Speaker election
- 20 April – Conservative MP Johnny Mercer is sacked as Minister for Veterans by Boris Johnson.

=== May ===
- 1 May – John McFall, Baron McFall of Alcluith becomes the Lord Speaker
- 5 May – French fishermen protest off Jersey as part of the Jersey fishing licences dispute.
- 6 May:
  - A series of elections took place for local councils and directly elected mayors in England, as well as police and crime commissioners in England and Wales
  - Welsh Parliament election
  - Scottish Parliament election
  - London Assembly election
  - London mayoral election
  - 2021 Hartlepool by-election
  - The National Assembly for Wales officially changes its name to Senedd Cymru/Welsh Parliament.
- 8 May – Steve Aiken resigns as the leader of the Ulster Unionist Party.
- 9 May – 2021 Shadow Cabinet reshuffle
- 11 May – 2021 State Opening of Parliament
- 13 May –
  - 2021 Airdrie and Shotts by-election
  - Lord Benyon is appointed Parliamentary Under-Secretary of State for Rural Affairs and Biosecurity.
- 14 May – May 2021 Democratic Unionist Party leadership election
- 28 May – Edwin Poots becomes Leader of the Democratic Unionist Party.

=== June ===
- 11 to 13 June: 47th G7 summit is held at Carbis Bay, Cornwall.
- 17 June – Edwin Poots resigns as leader of the Democratic Unionist Party, having only been in position for 21 days, triggering a new leadership contest: see June 2021 Democratic Unionist Party leadership election. Paul Givan becomes First Minister of Northern Ireland.
- 17 June – 2021 Chesham and Amersham by-election.
- 22 June – Jeffrey Donaldson is elected unopposed in the June 2021 Democratic Unionist Party leadership election.
- 26 June – Matt Hancock resigns as Secretary of State for Health and Social Care.

=== July ===
- 1 July – 2021 Batley and Spen by-election.
- 2 July – Angela Merkel makes a visit to the UK, her last as Chancellor of Germany.
- 5 July – Jonathan Bartley stands down as leader of the Green Party of England and Wales.
- 7 July – James Brokenshire tenders his resignation as Minister for Security to Prime Minister Boris Johnson, stating his recovery from lung cancer was "taking longer than expected"

=== August ===
- 13 August – Damian Hinds returned to government as Minister of State for Security following the resignation of James Brokenshire on health grounds.
- 18 August – Parliament was recalled due to the situation in Afghanistan.
- 19 August – 2021 Wiltshire Police and Crime Commissioner by-election
- 31 August – The Scottish National Party and the Scottish Greens sign a power sharing agreement.

=== September ===
- 2 September – The 2021 Green Party of England and Wales leadership election begins.
- 15 September – Boris Johnson carries out his second major cabinet reshuffle, same day, AUKUS is announced
- 17 September – Liberal Democrats annual conference opens in Canary Wharf.
- 23 September – 2021 Green Party of England and Wales leadership election ends.
- 25 September – The 2021 Labour Party Conference opens in Brighton, East Sussex.
- 27 September – Andy McDonald resigns from the Shadow Cabinet of Keir Starmer.

=== October ===
- 1 October – It is announced that Carla Denyer and Adrian Ramsay won the 2021 Green Party of England and Wales leadership election.
- 1 October – Reform UK conference opened in Manchester.
- 3 October – The 2021 Conservative Party Conference opens in Manchester.
- 7 October – Conservative MP for Old Bexley and Sidcup James Brokenshire dies from lung cancer at the age of 53.
- 13 October – Labour MP for Leicester East Claudia Webbe found guilty of harassment. The Labour Party called on her to resign from parliament.
- 15 October – Conservative MP for Southend West David Amess is murdered after being stabbed at a constituency surgery at a Methodist church in Leigh-on-Sea. Police are investigating it as a terror attack.
- 27 October – October 2021 United Kingdom budget was unveiled by Chancellor Rishi Sunak.
- 31 October – 2021 United Nations Climate Change Conference (COP26) begins in Glasgow.

=== November ===
- 4 November – Owen Paterson, Conservative MP for North Shropshire announces his resignation from parliament.
- 4 November – Claudia Webbe MP for Leicester East expelled from the Labour Party following sentencing.
- 24 November – November 2021 English Channel disaster
- 25 November – 2021 North Yorkshire Police, Fire and Crime Commissioner by-election
- 27 November – Boris Johnson announces new measures for England in response to the new SARS-CoV-2 Omicron variant

=== December ===
- 2 December – Old Bexley and Sidcup by-election
- 16 December – 2021 North Shropshire by-election

== Events in the year ==
- Greensill scandal
- Westminster Christmas parties controversy

== Deaths ==
- 4 January – Kay Ullrich, Scottish politician (b. 1943)
- 8 January – Michael Shaw, Baron Shaw of Northstead, English politician (b. 1920)
- 23 January – Robert Rowland, English politician (b. 1966)
- 24 January – Bobby McKee, Northern Irish politician (b. 1941)
- 2 February – Maureen Colquhoun, English politician; first openly lesbian British MP (b. 1928)
- 6 February – Andrew Fraser, Baron Fraser of Corriegarth, Scottish politician and peer (b. 1946)
- 4 April – Dame Cheryl Gillan, politician, MP (since 1992), Secretary of State for Wales (2010–2012) (b. 1952).
- 6 April – Peter Ainsworth, politician, MP (1992–2010) (b. 1956)
- 9 April – Ian Gibson, politician, MP (1997–2009) (b. 1938)
- 12 April – Shirley Williams, politician, MP (1964–1979, 1981–1983), Secretary of State for Education and Paymaster General (1976–1979) (b. 1930)
- 17 April – Frank Judd, Baron Judd, politician, MP (1966–1979) (b. 1935).
- 24 April – Trevor Smith, Baron Smith of Clifton, politician and life peer (b. 1937)
- 15 May – George Little, Scottish-Canadian politician (b. 1937)
- 18 June – Andrew Welsh, Scottish politician, MP (1974–1979, 1987–2001), MSP (1999–2011) (b. 1944).
- 20 June – Gordon Dunne, politician, MLA (2011–2021) (b. 1959).
- 24 June – Dick Leonard, journalist and politician, MP (1970–1974) (b. 1930).
- 7 July – Elystan Morgan, Baron Elystan-Morgan, Welsh politician, MP (1966–1974) and member of the House of Lords (1981–2020) (b. 1932).
- 2 August – Peter Smith, Baron Smith of Leigh, politician and life peer, member of the House of Lords (since 1999) (born 1945).
- 18 August – Austin Mitchell, politician, MP (1977–2015) (b. 1934).
- 27 August – Noel Cringle, Manx politician, President of Tynwald (2000–2011) (b. 1937).
- 9 September – Bruce McFee, Scottish politician, MSP (2003–2007), complications from a stroke (b. 1961).
- 24 September – Grey Ruthven, 2nd Earl of Gowrie, Irish-born politician, businessman, and arts administrator, chancellor of the Duchy of Lancaster (1984–1985) (b. 1939).
- 1 October – Sir Dennis Walters, politician, MP (1964–1992) (b. 1928).
- 7 October – James Brokenshire, politician, MP (since 2005), secretary of state for Northern Ireland (2016–2018) and housing, communities and local government (2018–2019), lung cancer (b. 1968).
- 15 October – Sir David Amess, politician, MP (since 1983), stabbed (b. 1952).
- 17 October – Ernie Ross, politician, MP (1979–2005) (b. 1942).
- 26 October – Isabel Turner, Scottish-born Canadian politician, mayor of Kingston, Ontario (2000–2003), pneumonia (b. 1936).
- 31 October – Sir Jim Lester, politician, MP (1974–1997) (b. 1932).
- 7 November – Sir John Butterfill, politician, MP (1983–2010) (b. 1941).
- 1 December – Bertram Bowyer, 2nd Baron Denham, politician, member of the House of Lords (1949–2021) and captain of the Honourable Corps of Gentlemen-at-Arms (1979–1991) (b. 1927).
- 2 December – Bill McKenzie, Baron McKenzie of Luton, politician and life peer, member of the House of Lords (since 2004) (b. 1946).

== See also ==
- General politics timelines by year
  - 2020 in politics and government
- Other UK timelines by year
  - 2020 in the United Kingdom
- Decade articles
  - 2010s in political history
  - 2010s in United Kingdom political history
- Other country timelines
  - 2021 in United States politics and government
- Draft articles:
  - 2020s in United Kingdom political history

=== Specific situations and issues ===
- Premiership of Boris Johnson
- Chancellorship of Rishi Sunak
