= 2021 in United States politics and government =

Events in 2021 pertaining to politics and government in the United States.

== Events ==
=== January ===
- January 1
  - Congress overrides President Donald Trump's veto of the National Defense Authorization Act for Fiscal Year 2021 (NDAA).
  - Trump vetoes a bipartisan drift net fishing bill.
- January 3
  - Nancy Pelosi is reelected Speaker of the United States House of Representatives.
  - Donald Trump is caught on tape pressuring Georgia election officials to "find" 11,780 votes to overturn the election results.
- January 4 – British District Judge Vanessa Baraitser rules that extradition of Julian Assange to the United States would be "oppressive" because of Assange's mental health.
- January 5
  - Elections
    - 2020–21 United States Senate election in Georgia: ABC News and NBC News declare Jon Ossoff (D) the winner. Democrats will control both chambers of Congress for the first time since 2010.
    - 2020–21 United States Senate special election in Georgia: The Associated Press declares Raphael Warnock (D) the winner.
  - The Republican-controlled Pennsylvania State Senate refuses to seat Senator Jim Brewster (D-Allegheny).
- January 6 – The 117th United States Congress convenes to certify the Electoral College results of the 2020 presidential election. Thousands of Trump supporters threaten "wild protests". Capitol police are forced to evacuate several buildings as mobs of Trump supporters storm them in protest. 1 unarmed protester is shot.
- January 7
  - Biden names Judge Merrick Garland Attorney General.
  - Congress certifies the Biden-Harris victory.
- January 8 – Speaker Pelosi says she spoke to Joint Chiefs of Staff Chairman Mark Milley to ask what was being done to rein in an "unhinged" president so he does not use the nuclear launch codes. She also called on Vice President Pence to use the Twenty-fifth Amendment to remove the president.
- January 12
  - 2021 efforts to remove Donald Trump from office: House calls upon Vice President Pence to invoke the Twenty-fifth Amendment. Pence says he will not.
  - Secretary of State Mike Pompeo was forced to cancel his trip to Europe as leaders refuse to meet with him.
- January 13
  - All House Democrats and ten Republicans vote to impeach Donald Trump a second time.
  - Former Michigan governor Rick Snyder is charged for his role in the Flint water crisis.
- January 14 – Andrew Yang declares his candidacy for mayor of New York City.
- January 15 – President-elect Joe Biden names Eric Lander head of the Office of Science and Technology Policy, which will become a Cabinet-level post.
- January 17 – Small groups of right-wing protesters demonstrate in heavily fortified state capitals.
- January 18
  - Vice President-elect Kamala Harris resigns her Senate seat.
  - Martin Luther King Jr. Day demonstrations: Hundreds of armed gun-rights advocates representing Boogaloo bois, Black Panthers, Proud Boys and other groups march in Richmond, Virginia. Yelling but no violence reported. A peaceful demonstration in New York became violent in the evening as Black Lives Matter advocates clashed with police outside New York City Hall. Twenty-nine people were arrested and eleven police officers were injured.
- January 19
  - Secretary of State Pompeo says China's policy toward the Uyghurs and other Muslims amounts to genocide.
  - Joe Biden and Kamala Harris's first act upon arrival in Washington, DC is to attend a memorial for the 400,000 victims of COVID-19 at the Lincoln Memorial Reflecting Pool.
- January 20
  - Inauguration of Joe Biden: In heavily fortified Washington, DC, the new President of the United States offers a silent prayer for the 400,000 victims of COVID-19 and stresses the need for unity. "Politics doesn't have to be a raging fire, destroying everything in its path. Every disagreement doesn't have to be a cause for total war. And we must reject the culture in which facts themselves are manipulated, and even manufactured," he said. Vice President Mike Pence, members of the Supreme Court, and former presidents Barack Obama, George W. Bush, and Bill Clinton were in attendance with their spouses.
  - Kamala Harris makes history as the first female and woman of color Vice President of the United States.
  - Donald Trump skips the inauguration and arrives in Mar-a-Lago, Florida, at 11:00 a.m.
  - Democrats take over the Senate as Raphael Warnock (GA), Jon Ossoff (GA), and as well as Alex Padilla (CA) are sworn in.
- January 21 – A New York state judge rules that Attorney General Tish James can continue its case that leaders of the National Rifle Association of America (NRA) misused funds and engaged in self-dealing. The organization had argued the case should be resolved in federal court in Albany.
- January 25
  - The Supreme Court of the United States (SCOTUS) dismisses two cases that asserted former President Trump violated the Emoluments Clause of the Constitution, saying the cases are "moot". In another case, the Court ruled against a Texas ban on nearly all abortions during the pandemic. Senator Rob Portman declines to run for re-election in the 2022 midterms, dealing a huge blow to Republicans' efforts to take back the Senate in 2022, due to Portman's high popularity in the state compared to its usual swing state status.
  - The House of Representatives delivers its impeachment article to the Senate.
- January 27 – The Department of Homeland Security (DHS) issues a nation-wide National Terrorism Advisory warning though April 30 because of concerns about violent extremists, COVID-19 restrictions, the 2020 election results, and police use of force.
- January 28 – Multiple Members of Congress, including Representatives Ted Lieu (D-CA) and Alexandria Ocasio-Cortez (D-NY) and Senators Elizabeth Warren (D-MA) and Ted Cruz (R-TX) call for an investigation into the GameStop short squeeze and the role Robinhood played in it.
- January 30 – Defense Secretary Lloyd Austin fires all members of 42 DoD advisory boards, many stacked with Trump loyalists, until a review is completed.

=== February ===
- February 1 – House Speaker Nancy Pelosi (D-CA) and Senate Majority Leader Chuck Schumer (D-NY) introduce a joint resolution paving the way for President Biden's $1.9T Comprehensive American Rescue Plan.
- February 2 – Senate Majority Leader Schumer (D-NY) and Minority Leader Mitch McConnell (R-KY) agree to a power-sharing agreement allowing for confirmation of President Biden's nominees. Senators Joe Manchin (D-WV) and Kyrsten Sinema (D-AZ) have agreed not to vote to eliminate the filibuster.
- February 4 – Congresswoman Marjorie Taylor Greene (R-GA) is removed from all committee assignments on a 230–199 vote including 11 Republicans and all 219 Democrats.
- February 9 – Second impeachment trial of Donald Trump begins.
- February 12
  - White House Deputy Press Secretary TJ Ducklo is suspended for a week without pay after threats and misogynistic comments he made to Politico reporter Tara Palmeri are made public.
  - New York leaders question Governor Andrew Cuomo′s handling of nursing home admissions during the early days of the COVID-19 pandemic. A New York Post article cited Melissa DeRosa, a top Cuomo, admitting that the state hid data on nursing home deaths "so President Donald Trump's administration couldn't use it against New York".
- February 13
  - Impeachment trial
    - The Senate votes 55–45 to call witnesses in the Trump trial. They later agreed to accept a written, sworn deposition from Congresswoman Jaime Herrera Beutler (R-WA) instead.
    - The former president is acquitted with the vote of 48 Democrats, two Independents, and seven Republicans in favor and 43 Republicans against conviction. 67 votes were needed to secure a conviction.
  - TJ Ducklo resigns from the White House press corps.
- February 14 – President Biden reestablishes the White House Office of Faith-Based and Neighborhood Partnerships with Melissa Rogers as head.
- February 16 – Poor planning leads to a shortage of natural gas, which is reflected in a massive power outage in Texas including at least 23 deaths during a cold snap.
- February 17 – Mayor Tim Boyd of Colorado City, Texas resigns after mocking people for asking for assistance following water, heat, and electrical shortages during February 2021 North American ice storm.
- February 18
  - Senator Ted Cruz (R-TX) admits that his family vacation to Mexico during the Texas power crisis was a mistake.
  - South Carolina Governor Henry McMaster (R) signs a restrictive abortion law.
- February 19 – The U.S. formally rejoins the Paris Agreement on climate.
- February 23
  - In a committee hearing, Senator Ron Johnson (R-WI) rejects expert testimony that suggests the storming of the Capitol was planned and organized by right-wing extremists and instead blames women, children, and antifa.
  - U.S. District Judge for the Southern District of Texas Drew B. Tipton issues a preliminary injunction halting President Biden's deportation freeze. In a separate action, the administration struggles to explain how Biden's child separation policy is different from Trump's "kids in cages" policy.
- February 24 – Acting Capitol Police chief Yogananda Pittman warns that militia groups want to "blow up the Capitol" during the next State of the Union address.
- February 25 – Biden nominates three Democrats to the Board of Governors of the United States Postal Service.
- February 25
  - President Biden orders an airstrike on Iranian-backed militias in Syria in retaliation for rocket attacks on U.S. targets in Iraq. Local sources say 22 were killed and the number of deaths is expected to increase.
  - The Parliamentarian of the United States Senate rules that a provision calling for a minimum wage increase in the American Rescue Plan cannot be considered under Reconciliation procedures due to the Byrd Rule. Democrats vow to look for other ways to pass legislation raising the minimum wage from $7.25 to $15.00.
- February 25–28 – Donald Trump is the featured speaker at the annual Conservative Political Action Conference (CPAC) meeting in Orlando. Trump condemns Biden as a poll shows 55% of attendees would support a Trump candidacy in 2024.

=== March ===
- March 2 – Texas Governor Greg Abbott (R) removes COVID-19 health restrictions including the mask mandate and opens businesses. Mississippi Governor Tate Reeves (R) follows suit. President Biden condemns them for "Neanderthal thinking".
- March 3 – The House passes the George Floyd Justice in Policing Act, 220–212. It also passes HR 1, the For the People Act by a vote of 220–210.
- March 4
  - Planned second attack on the Capitol by QAnon and Trump supporters, according to Congressman Adam Smith (D-WA). The House cancels its session. The event fizzled out.
  - The Senate takes up debate on the American Rescue Plan Act of 2021. Senator Ron Johnson (R-WI) insists the clerks read it aloud for no apparent reason.
  - Florida lawmakers ask the Department of Justice to investigate vaccination policies that allegedly favor Governor Ron DeSantis′s wealthy political supporters and campaign contributors.
- March 5 – Both chambers of the New York State Legislature vote to limit Governor Andrew Cuomo′s (D) emergency powers to deal with the COVID-19 pandemic in New York. Cuomo is under investigation regarding underreporting nursing home deaths during the early stages of the pandemic and another alleging sexual misconduct.
- March 6 – The Senate votes 50-49 along party lines to approve the COVID-19 relief bill (American Rescue Plan Act of 2021) including $1,400 stimulus checks. Dan Sullivan (R-AK) was absent. The bill has to be repassed by the House before President Biden can sign it.
- March 7 – While commemorating Bloody Sunday during the 1965 Selma to Montgomery march, President Biden signs an executive order directing federal agencies to expand access to voter registration and election information.
- March 10 – Marcia Fudge (D-OH) casts a vote to join the House majority in approving the COVID-19 relief bill and then steps down to become United States Secretary of Housing and Urban Development shortly after the Senate approves her nomination, 66–34. The Senate also approves Merrick Garland as United States Attorney General on a 70–30 vote and Michael S. Regan at the EPA (66–34).
- March 11 – President Biden officially signs the COVID-19 relief bill (American Rescue Plan Act of 2021) into law.
- March 12 – The United States Senate approves the nomination of Representative Deb Haaland to be the Secretary of Interior (51–40). Haaland is the first Native American to hold a position in the President's cabinet.
- March 18 – Congressman Chip Roy (R-TX) advocates lynching in the wake of the 2021 Atlanta spa shootings that killed eight women, including six Asian American women.
- March 20 – Spring breakers riot in response to a state of emergency issued in Miami, Florida.
- March 30
  - The Republican-controlled Kentucky General Assembly overrides the governor's veto of a law in order to undermine democratic succession in the United States Senate.
  - Arizona declares a state holiday to honor World War II code talkers; it will be celebrated on August 14.
- March 30 – Biden nominates eleven candidates to the federal judiciary.
- March 31 – New York legalizes recreational marijuana.

=== April ===
- April 14:
  - U.S. Special Presidential Envoy for Climate John Kerry became the first senior official of Biden administration to visit China. In his later visit to South Korea, Kerry announced his support of the Japanese recent decision to dump radioactive water of the Fukushima nuclear plant to the Pacific, which the South Korean government protested to the US.
  - President Biden announces that US troops from Afghanistan would be withdrawn by September 11, 2021.

=== May ===
- May 28 – Senate Republicans filibuster an independent bipartisan January 6 commission to investigate the 2021 United States Capitol attack.

=== June ===
- June 7–8 — Vice President Harris travels to Guatemala and Mexico to discuss immigration issues with Presidents Alejandro Giammattei and Andrés Manuel López Obrador, respectively.
- June 8
  - President Biden travels to Carbis Bay, Cornwall, England for the Group of Seven (G7) summit.
  - Senate Republicans filibuster the Paycheck Fairness Act, which would combat pay discrimination against women and LGBTQ+ workers.

=== July ===
- July 9 – Illinois becomes the first U.S. state to require teaching history about Asian Americans in public schools.

=== August ===
- August 10
  - New York Governor Andrew Cuomo announces his resignation, effective two weeks later, following a state Attorney General report on his sexual misconduct.
  - The Senate passes the INVEST Act, 69–30.

==== September ====
- September 11 - scheduled 2021 Withdrawal of U.S. troops from Afghanistan.
- September 30 – 2020 census results will become available, allowing states to draw districts. Previous deadlines of April 30 for federal redistricting and July 31 for state redistricting have been pushed back.

October

==== November ====
- November 2 – 2021 United States elections. New Jersey and Virginia hold their state elections in years that are one more than a multiple of 4, including 2021. Mayors across the country will also be elected on this day, and there will be some ballot questions.

December

== Issues ==
Note: The following is a summary of key political issues in 2021.

=== Climate change and environment ===
NASA says that 2020 is tied with 2016 for the hottest year on record.

President Joe Biden signed an executive order rejoining the Paris Agreement on climate change within hours of his inauguration on January 20, signalling that he intends to prioritize the issue. He signed another order revoking the Keystone Pipeline and is expected to halt oil and gas leasing in the Arctic National Wildlife Refuge.

=== Census ===
President Biden revoked two Trump directives related to the 2020 census. One tried to determine the citizenship status of U.S. residents through administrative records, and the other sought to exclude undocumented immigrants from the numbers used for apportioning congressional seats among the states.

=== Drug reform ===
Arizona became the fifteenth state to legalize recreational marijuana on January 22, 2021. Voters in New Jersey, South Dakota, and Montana also approved making possession of recreational marijuana legal last November.

Advocates are expected to push for marijuana and drug reform at the federal level as well as reforms in bank laws that would make the business easier and safer in those areas that already allow the sale of marijuana. Democratic Senators Chuck Schumer (NY), Cory Booker (D-NJ), and Ron Wyden (D-OR) have said they plan to introduce legislation removing marijuana from a federal list of prohibited drugs in 2021.

=== Election law ===
Both Democrats and Republicans support major changes to election laws, but their perspectives and proposed solutions are diametrically opposite. Republicans want an investigation of irregularities in the 2020 elections and more restrictions on mail-in voting. The Texas Legislature Georgia General Assembly, North Carolina General Assembly, and other red-state legislatures have already begun pushing for tighter restrictions. Democrats want national rules to make voting more uniform and accessible across the nation. They would mandate early voting and same-day registration along with other reforms. Also, under HR-51, if passed, would allow 16 year olds to vote and members of congress to use campaign funds for personal use. Voters would not have to show ID to vote.

=== Foreign policy ===
==== China ====
China became increasingly aggressive militarily and on trade under the Trump administration. Secretary of State nominee Antony Blinken has made it clear that the U.S.-Chinese relation will be his most important challenge. He promised to address the issue from a position of strength. Defense Secretary Lloyd Austin also said China is a top priority.

==== Middle East and Afghanistan ====
Biden White House national security adviser Jake Sullivan said that the United States would review its peace agreement with the Taliban to withdraw its remaining 2,500 soldiers from the War in Afghanistan by May. President Biden intends to sign an executive order to review Forever Wars in Afghanistan, Iraq, and elsewhere.

Tensions with Iran heat up on the anniversary of the Assassination of Qasem Soleimani on January 3.

As the Yemeni Civil War rages, Mike Pompeo declared the Houthi movement a terrorist organization. President Biden suspended that for a month in January so the policy can be reviewed. If the designation sticks, international banking with Yemen is likely to halt, leading to a famine in a country where 80% of the people already face food insecurity.

The Biden administration reversed Trump policies on Palestine–United States relations, restoring relations the country and promising aid.

==== Russia ====
President Biden is expected to be tougher on Russia than Donald Trump was. Biden hopes to work with Russia on an extension of the New Strategic Arms Reduction Treaty (New START).

==== Nuclear proliferation ====
The Treaty on the Prohibition of Nuclear Weapons (TPNW) went into effect on January 22, 2021, but critics note that no actual nuclear power has signed it. The Biden administration is concerned about North Korea and weapons of mass destruction and is determined that Iran will not gain nuclear capability. The U.S. hopes for an extension of the New START agreement with Russia. Russia agreed to discuss New START and the two countries exchanged documents after a Biden-Putin phone call on January 25.

=== Health ===
2021 begins with 346,000 pandemic-related deaths, according to the Centers for Disease Control and Prevention (CDC). Over 20 million people had been infected and 4.2 million have received the first vaccine dose by January 2, well behind the projected 20 million doses by the end of 2020. Democrats plan to increase spending to support a more robust government effort to combat the virus and to provide economic support for individuals, government entities, small businesses, and schools.

=== Immigration ===
Among his first acts as president, Joe Biden halted construction of the border wall, froze deportations of undocumented immigrants, and proposed comprehensive immigration reforms. Republicans are expected to fight changes from Trump-era policies.

=== Minimum wage ===
Twenty states and 32 cities raised their minimum wage to $15/hour or more on January 1, and five states and 18 entitites are expected to follow suit later in 2021. The fight to increase the federal minimum wage to $15 promises stiff resistance from business interests.

=== Terrorism ===
Fears of domestic terrorism outweigh foreign threats following the storming of the Capitol on January 6. More than 20,000 National Guard troops were called upon to help provide security for the January 20 inauguration of President Biden, and although there were no significant incidents in Washington or state capitals, 5,000 remained for the Trump impeachment trial. At least 135 suspect have been arrested and 400 identified as of January 26 in the attack. DHS issued a terrorist advisory starting January 27.

== See also ==
=== Country overviews ===
- United States
- History of United States
- History of modern United States
- Outline of United States
- Government of United States
- Politics of United States
- Years in United States
- Timeline of United States history

=== Related timelines for current period ===
- 2021
- 2020s in political history
- 2021 in the United States
- 2021 in United Kingdom politics and government
- 2021 in Mexican politics and government
- 2020s
