= 2010s in the United Kingdom =

Events from the decade 2010s in the United Kingdom.

There were four prime ministers during this time (Brown, Cameron, May, Johnson). However, Brown and Johnson were collectively in power for less than a year of this decade, the vast majority of the decade being under Cameron and May's premierships. There were four general elections (2010, 2015, 2017, 2019) and three parties (Labour, Conservatives, Liberal Democrats as a junior coalition partner) had been in government during this time. The decade began with the last months of an unpopular Labour government that had been in power for 13 years had overseen the 2008 financial crisis, and the 2010 United Kingdom general election that resulted in the first hung parliament in 36 years. The decade ended with a Parliamentary deadlock over the issue of Brexit that ultimately led to the resignation of Theresa May as prime minister. Boris Johnson decided that leading a minority government was unviable, and Parliament arranged for an early general election (the first winter election since 1974), which produced the biggest Conservative majority since 1987.

Notable trends during the 2010s included an increase in euroscepticism culminating in a vote by a small margin in favour of leaving the EU in the 2016 Brexit referendum, four electoral victories for the Conservative Party and a concomitant decline in electoral performance for the Labour Party, and national debates concerning devolved administrations and independence movements, particularly in Scotland where the 2014 Scottish independence referendum saw 55.3% of voters support remaining part of the UK.

The 2010 election saw the far-right British National Party (BNP) peak with 1.9% of the vote, representing the most successful electoral performance for an extreme-right party in UK history. The BNP would see their support decrease afterwards. The 2010s saw the UK Independence Party (UKIP) increasing in support. In the 2015 general election, UKIP peaked with over 3.8 million votes (12.6% of the total), replacing the Liberal Democrats as the third most popular party.

== History by Premiership ==
=== Premiership of Gordon Brown (2010) ===
==== 2010 general election ====
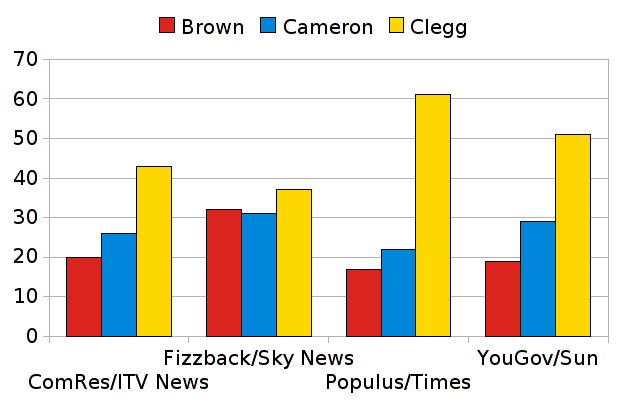
Polling on the winner of the UK's first national election debate in 2010.

At the beginning of the decade the UK was governed by the Labour Party, which had been in power since its landslide victory in the 1997 general election before winning comfortable majorities in the 2001 and 2005 general elections. The prime minister was Gordon Brown, who had been in office since 2007. On 6 April 2010, Brown visited Buckingham Palace to seek the Queen's permission to dissolve Parliament on 12 April, initiating a general election on 6 May. Notable events in that campaign included the UK's first televised debates between the leaders of the main parties. In these debates the prime minister was widely considered to have been outperformed by his opponents David Cameron of the Conservative Party and especially Nick Clegg of the Liberal Democrats.

At the election, Labour lost 91 seats in the House of Commons, but the Conservatives failed to achieve an overall majority, resulting in the first hung parliament since 1974. Brown remained temporarily as prime minister, while the Liberal Democrats and Conservatives entered into talks aimed at forming a coalition government. There were also talks between the Liberal Democrats and Labour. On 10 May, Brown announced his intention to resign as leader of the Labour Party and instructed the party to initiate the election of a new leader. Brown's continued presence as prime minister was seen an obstacle to the negotiation of a Labour-Liberal Democrat deal. In a telephone conversation with his predecessor Tony Blair, Blair suggested to Brown that the election had shown that British voters had lost faith in both him and the Labour Party and that the United Kingdom would not accept him continuing as prime minister. He concluded that he would not be able to form a government, and announced his resignation as prime minister. He also resigned as leader of the Labour Party with immediate effect. Brown was succeeded as prime minister by David Cameron, whose party had formed a coalition with the Liberal Democrats, while Harriet Harman became acting leader of the Labour Party. The latter until Ed Miliband's victory in the 2010 labour leadership contest a few months later.

=== Premiership of David Cameron (2010–2016) ===
David Cameron

==== Appointment ====
The premiership of David Cameron began on 11 May 2010 when Cameron accepted the Queen's invitation to form a government, after the resignation of Cameron's predecessor as Prime Minister of the United Kingdom, Gordon Brown. While serving as prime minister, Cameron also served as First Lord of the Treasury, Minister for the Civil Service and Leader of the Conservative Party. He headed a coalition government between the Conservatives and the Liberal Democrats. He immediately appointed Nick Clegg, the leader of the Liberal Democrats, as deputy prime minister. Between them, the Conservatives and Liberal Democrats controlled 363 seats in the House of Commons, with a majority of 76 seats.

==== Policies ====
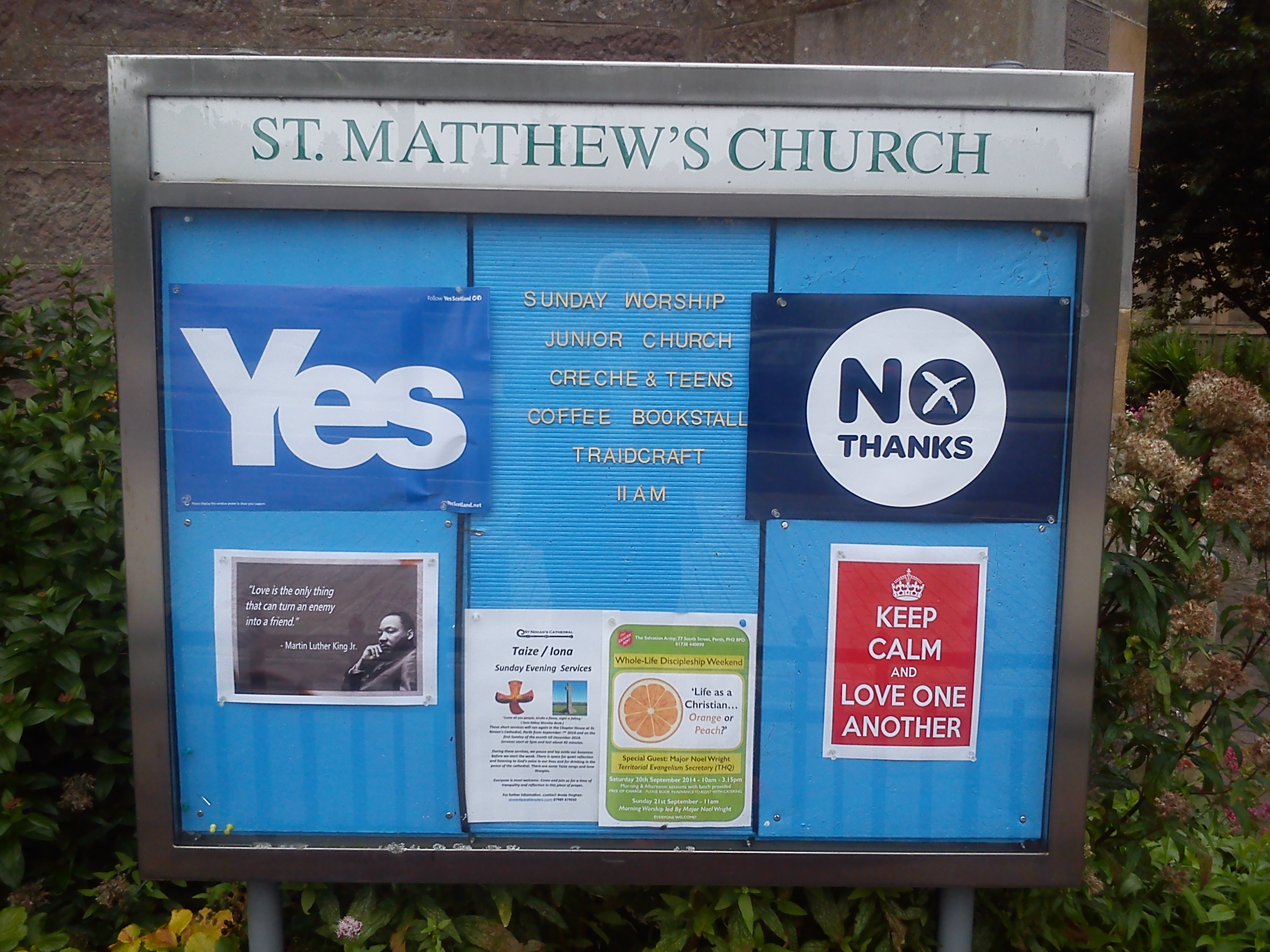
Campaign material from both sides of the 2014 Scottish independence referendum on a Church notice board in Perth.

Throughout his time in office, Cameron's government attempted to reduce the large deficit in government finances through austerity measures. Internationally, his government intervened militarily in the Libyan Civil War and later authorised the bombing of the Islamic State; domestically, his government oversaw the referendum on voting reform and the Scottish independence referendum, both of which confirmed Cameron's favoured outcome (a "No" in each case).

==== 2015 general election ====
The 2015 United Kingdom general election was held on Thursday, 7 May 2015 to elect 650 members to the House of Commons. After the 2015 general election, Cameron was re-elected as prime minister, but this time at the head of a Conservative majority government with a parliamentary majority of 12 seats. He also became the first prime minister since 1900 to continue in office immediately after a term of at least four years with a larger popular vote share, and the only prime minister other than Margaret Thatcher to continue in office immediately after a term of at least four years with a greater number of seats. The Labour Party, led by Ed Miliband, saw a small increase in its share of the vote to 30.4%, but incurred a net loss of seats to return 232 MPs. This was its lowest seat tally since the 1987 general election. Senior Labour Shadow Cabinet members, notably Ed Balls, Douglas Alexander, and Scottish Labour leader Jim Murphy, were defeated.

The Scottish National Party, enjoying a surge in support since the 2014 Scottish independence referendum, recorded a number of huge swings of over 30% (including a record-breaking swing of 39.3% achieved in Glasgow North East) from Labour, as it won 56 of the 59 Scottish seats to become the third-largest party in the Commons. The Liberal Democrats, led by outgoing deputy prime minister Nick Clegg, had their worst result since their formation in 1988, holding just eight out of their previous 57 seats, with Cabinet ministers Vince Cable, Ed Davey and Danny Alexander losing their seats. UKIP came third in terms of votes with 12.6%, but only won one seat, with party leader Nigel Farage failing to win the seat of South Thanet. The Green Party won its highest-ever share of the vote with 3.8%, and retained the Brighton Pavilion seat with an increased majority, though did not win any additional seats. Labour's Miliband (as national leader) and Murphy (as Scottish leader) both resigned, as did Clegg. They were replaced over the following months by Jeremy Corbyn, Kezia Dugdale and Tim Farron respectively. Farage said that his resignation was rejected by his party, and remained in post.

==== EU referendum and end of premiership ====
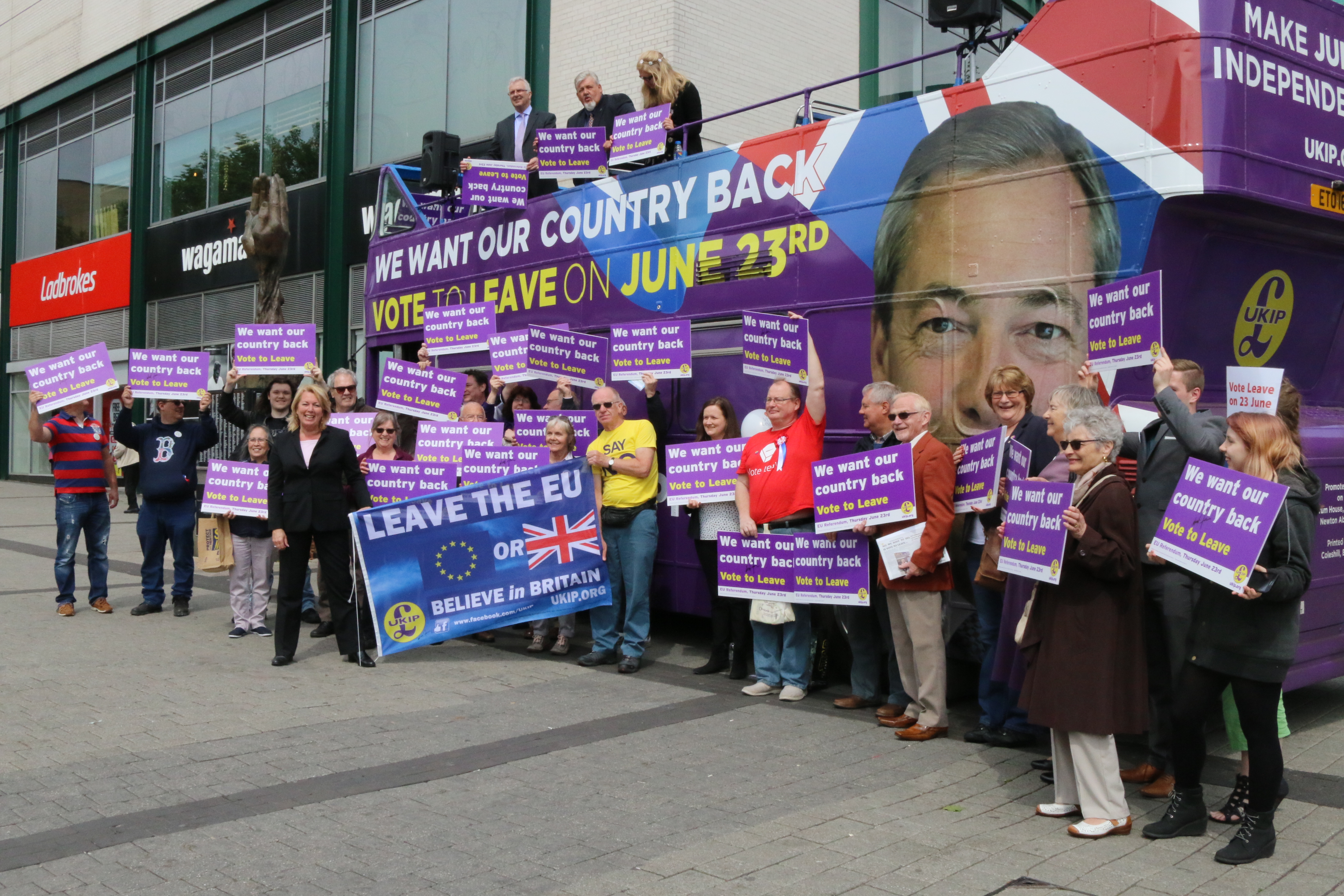
Pro-Brexit campaigners during the run up to the 2016 EU membership referendum

Of the 382 voting areas in the United Kingdom and Gibraltar a total of 270 returned majority votes in favour of "Leave" whereas 129 returned majority votes in favour of "Remain" in the referendum including all 32 areas in Scotland. Leave Remain

In a referendum held on 23 June 2016, the UK voted to withdraw from the European Union, with a result of 52% for withdrawal and 48% for remaining within the union. The following morning, Cameron announced in a televised speech outside 10 Downing Street that he intended to step down as prime minister following the Conservative Party conference in the autumn of that year. Cameron, who had campaigned in favour of the UK remaining in a reformed EU, said that he had informed the Queen of his decision before going to the public. He remarked that "fresh leadership" needed to come in to deliver Brexit. In the event, he officially resigned as prime minister sometime earlier on 13 July 2016.

=== Premiership of Theresa May (2016–2019) ===
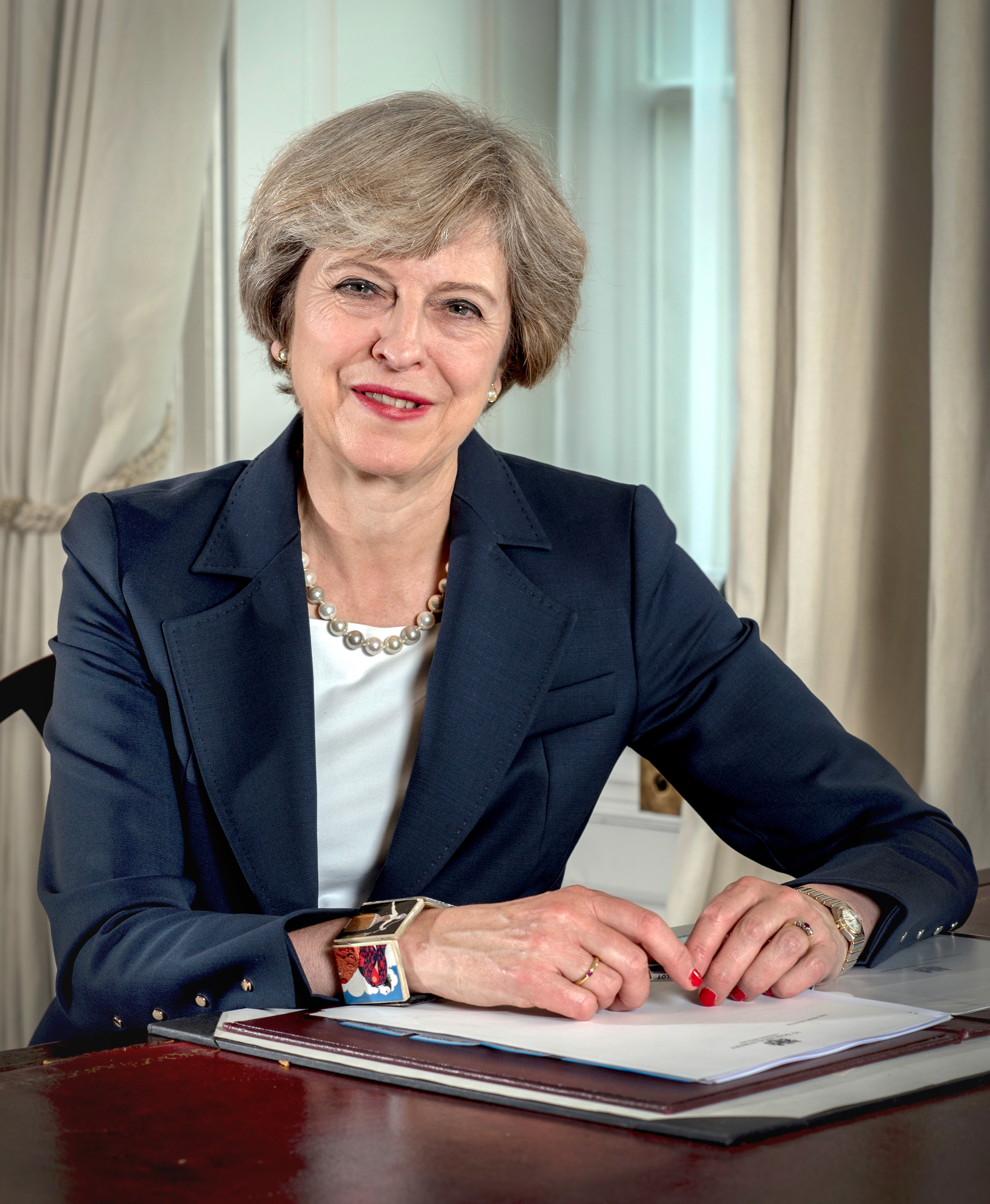
Theresa May

==== Party election ====
Following Cameron's resignation various senior conservatives ran in the Conservative Party leadership election, by the end of the first stages of the contest involving rounds of conservative MPs voting on the candidates Home Secretary Theresa May's only remaining competitor was Minister of State for Energy Andrea Leadsom, who withdrew from the race on 11 July 2016. Following this announcement, Cameron said that he would step down from his post on 13 July. Cameron formally tendered his resignation to Queen Elizabeth II on that day, who subsequently appointed Theresa May as his successor.

==== 2017 general election ====
Under the Fixed-term Parliaments Act 2011 an election had not been due until May 2020, but a call by Prime Minister Theresa May for a snap election was ratified by the necessary two-thirds vote in a 522–13 vote in the House of Commons on 19 April 2017. May said that she hoped to secure a larger majority to "strengthen [her] hand" in the forthcoming Brexit negotiations.

Opinion polls had consistently shown strong leads for the Conservatives over Labour. From a 21-point lead, the Conservatives' lead began to diminish in the final weeks of the campaign. In a surprising result, the Conservative Party made a net loss of 13 seats despite winning 42.4% of the vote (its highest share of the vote since 1983), whereas Labour made a net gain of 30 seats with 40.0% (its highest vote share since 2001 and the first time the party had gained seats since 1997). This was the closest result between the two major parties since February 1974 and their highest combined vote share since 1970. The Scottish National Party (SNP) and the Liberal Democrats, the third- and fourth-largest parties, both lost vote share; media coverage characterised the result as a return to two-party politics. The SNP, which had won 56 of the 59 Scottish seats at the previous general election in 2015, lost 21. The Liberal Democrats made a net gain of four seats. UKIP, the third-largest party in 2015 by number of votes, saw its share of the vote reduced from 12.6% to 1.8% and lost its only seat.

In Wales, Plaid Cymru gained one seat, giving it a total of four seats. The Green Party retained its sole seat, but saw its share of the vote reduced. In Northern Ireland, the Democratic Unionist Party (DUP) won 10 seats, Sinn Féin won seven, and Independent Unionist Sylvia Hermon retained her seat. The Social Democratic and Labour Party (SDLP) and Ulster Unionist Party (UUP) lost all their seats. The Conservatives were narrowly victorious and remained in power as a minority government, having secured a confidence and supply deal with the DUP.

==== Issues during premiership ====
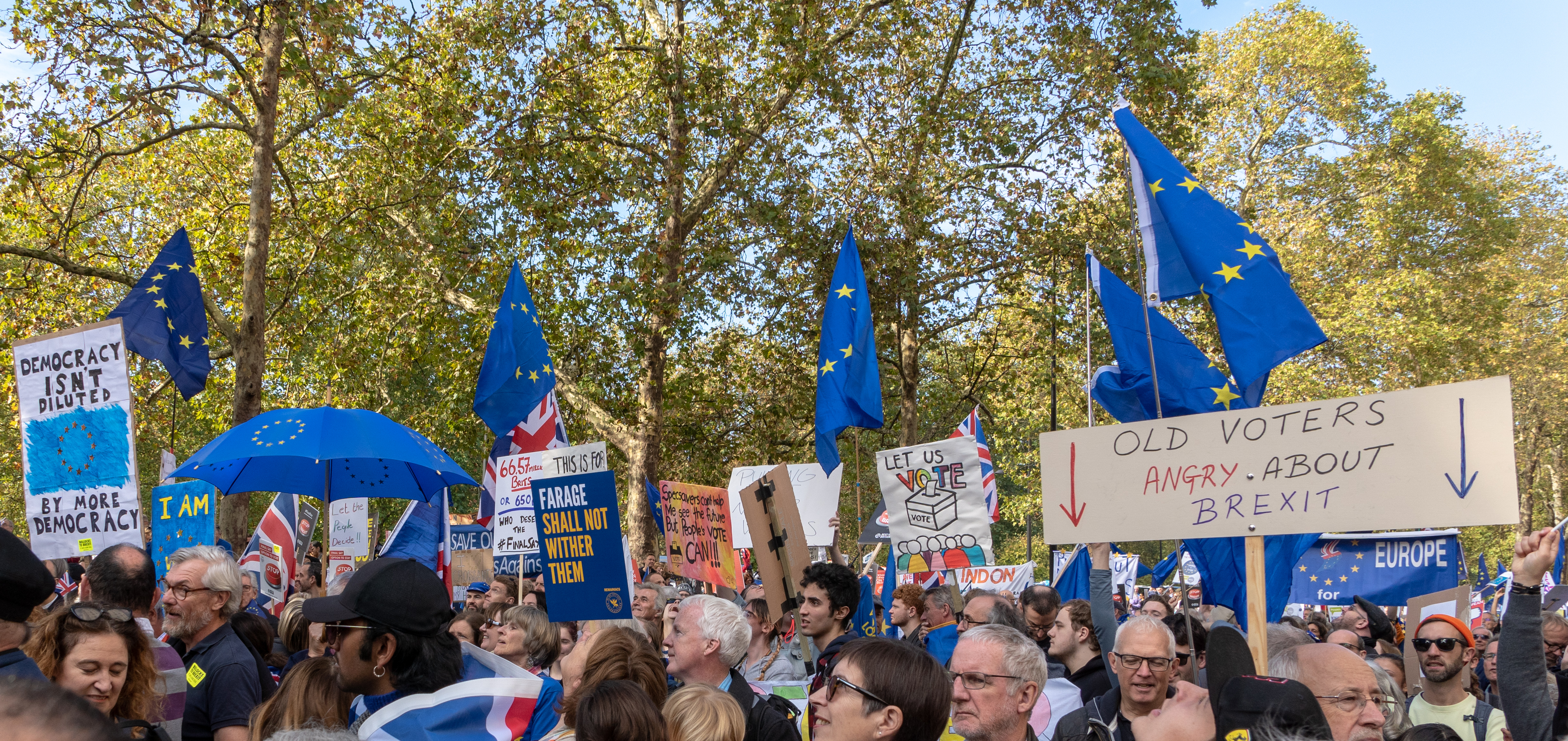
Anti-Brexit protestors in late 2018

May triggered Article 50 of the Treaty on European Union to leave the EU in March 2017. However, under her leadership, the government was unable to reach an EU withdrawal agreement approved by the Conservative Party as a whole. How to manage the border between Northern Ireland and the Republic of Ireland was a major problem; the so-called 'backstop'.

On 4 December 2018, the May government was found in contempt of Parliament; the first government to be found in contempt in history on a motion passed by MPs by 311 to 293 votes. The vote was triggered by the government failing to lay before Parliament any legal advice on the proposed withdrawal agreement on the terms of the UK's departure from the European Union, after a humble address for a return was unanimously agreed to by the House of Commons on 13 November 2018. The government then agreed to publish the full legal advice for Brexit that was given to the prime minister by the Attorney General during negotiations with the European Union.Theresa May, after failing to pass her Brexit withdrawal agreement through parliament three times, announced her resignation as prime minister of the United Kingdom on 24 May 2019 amidst calls for her to be ousted.

=== Premiership of Boris Johnson (2019) ===
==== Party election ====
Before the resignation, Boris Johnson had already confirmed at a business event in Manchester days earlier that he would run for Conservative Party leader if May were to do so.

Johnson won all five rounds of voting by MPs, and entered the final vote by Conservative Party members as the clear favourite to be elected PM. On 23 July, he emerged victorious over his rival Jeremy Hunt with 92,153 votes, 66.4% of the total ballot, while Hunt received 46,656 votes. These results were announced an event in the Queen Elizabeth II Centre in Westminster. In his first speech as prime minister Johnson pledged that Britain would leave the European Union (EU) by 31 October 2019, "no ifs or buts".

==== Annulled prorogation attempt ====
On 28 August 2019, Boris Johnson announced that he had asked The Queen to prorogue parliament from a date between 9–12 September until the opening of a new session on 14 October. Parliament was in any case due to have a three-week recess for the party conference season, and Johnson's prorogation would add around four days to the parliamentary break. The 2017–19 parliamentary session was the longest since the English Civil War, while the prorogation in 2019 at Johnson's request would have been the longest prorogation since 1930.

The government said that the prorogation was to allow for the government to set out a new legislative agenda. Others questioned this justification, and said that the prorogation was an improper attempt to evade parliamentary scrutiny of Johnson's Brexit plans in advance of the UK's planned departure from the European Union on 31 October 2019; opponents of prorogation included opposition MPs, UK constitutional law scholars, and Sir John Major, the former Conservative prime minister. The Speaker of the House of Commons, John Bercow, called the decision a "constitutional outrage".

Three separate cases were lodged before the courts alleging its illegality. The High Court of Justice in London found the issue to be non-justiciable, but the highest civil court in Scotland, the Court of Session sitting in Edinburgh, ruled prorogation was unlawful as it had the "improper purpose of stymieing Parliament". The issue was brought before the Supreme Court of the United Kingdom on 17 September 2019 in the cases R (Miller) v The Prime Minister and Cherry v Advocate General for Scotland. On 24 September, the Supreme Court ruled unanimously that the prorogation was both justiciable and unlawful, and therefore null and of no effect. Parliament resumed sitting the following day, resuming the parliamentary session. Bercow said he would ensure that the attempted prorogation would be expunged from the House of Commons Journal, the corrected formal record of parliamentary business, and replaced with a statement that Parliament was adjourned for the period of the absence.

==== Calls for early election ====
On 3 September 2019, Boris Johnson threatened to call a general election after opposition and rebel Conservative MPs successfully voted against the government to take control of the order of business with a view to preventing a no-deal exit.

Despite government opposition, the bill to block a no-deal exit passed the Commons on 4 September 2019, causing Johnson to call for a general election on 15 October. However, this motion was unsuccessful as it failed to command the support of two-thirds of the House as required by the Fixed-term Parliaments Act (FTPA). A second attempt at a motion for an early general election failed on 9 September.

==== Brexit negotiations ====
On 2 October the Government published a fresh Brexit plan, which included proposals to replace the Irish backstop. It would create an "all-island regulatory zone", meaning that Northern Ireland would essentially stay in the European Single Market for agricultural and industrial goods, meaning that sanitary and phytosanitary controls would be needed between Northern Ireland and Great Britain. The proposal also declared that Northern Ireland, along with the rest of the UK, would leave the Customs Union, meaning that customs controls would be needed for cross-border goods trade. The proposal did not appear to address cross-border services.

On 4 October the Government assured the highest civil court in Scotland that Johnson would send a letter to the EU seeking an extension to Article 50 as required by the European Union (Withdrawal) (No. 2) Act 2019. The court was originally due to release their ruling on 9 October, but decided to delay doing so until 21 October, to allow the court to "assess how circumstances have changed". On 17 October 2019, a revised withdrawal agreement, with a changed backstop, was agreed by the EU leaders and Boris Johnson.

On 19 October, a special Saturday sitting of Parliament was held to debate the revised agreement. MPs passed an amendment by 322 votes to 306 that withheld Parliament's approval until legislation implementing the deal had been passed, and forced the Government to request a delay to Brexit until 31 January 2020. Later that evening, 10 Downing Street confirmed that Boris Johnson would send a letter to the EU requesting an extension, but would not sign it. EU Council President Donald Tusk subsequently confirmed receipt of the letter, which Johnson had described as "Parliament's letter, not my letter". In addition, Johnson sent a second letter expressing the view that any further delay to Brexit would be a mistake.

On 22 October, the UK government brought the recently revised EU Withdrawal Bill to the House of Commons for debate. MPs voted on the Bill itself, which was passed by 329 votes to 299, and on the timetable for debating the Bill, which was defeated by 322 votes to 308. Prior to the votes, Johnson had stated that if his timetable failed to generate the support needed to pass in parliament he would abandon attempts to get the deal approved and would seek a general election. Following the vote, however, Johnson announced that the legislation would be paused while he consulted with other EU leaders. On 28 October 2019, it was confirmed that Brexit had been delayed until 31 January 2020. The following day, MPs backed a general election on 12 December 2019. On 30 October 2019, the day named as "exit day" in UK legislation was changed to 31 January 2020 at 11.00 pm.

==== 2019 general election ====
At the election, the Conservatives made a net gain of 48 seats, in what was regarded as a landslide victory, winning 43.6% of the vote (the highest share for any party since 1979) and 365 seats (the highest number for the party since 1987), whereas Labour made a net loss of 60 seats, losing several of its constituencies in northern England, across the Midlands and Wales to the Conservatives (often for the first time in many decades). Labour's losses in the general election led its leader Jeremy Corbyn to announce his intention to resign as the party's leader. The Liberal Democrats increased their vote share to 11.6% of the votes, though leader Jo Swinson was obliged under her party's rules to announce her resignation after losing her seat in East Dunbartonshire, leaving her party with 11 seats. The Green Party held its one-seat and saw its vote share increase.

The Scottish National Party (SNP) made a net gain of 13 seats across Scotland, winning 45% of the Scottish vote and 48 of the 59 Scottish seats, while in Wales, Plaid Cymru retained its four seats with no significant change in vote share. In Northern Ireland, for the first time more Irish Nationalist MPs were elected than British Unionists, although unionist parties still won more votes; Sinn Féin retained the same number of seats, and the DUP lost two seats, while the Social Democratic and Labour Party (SDLP) regained two seats, and the Alliance Party regained a seat, giving the latter two parties a restored presence in the House of Commons.

==== Post-election aftermath ====
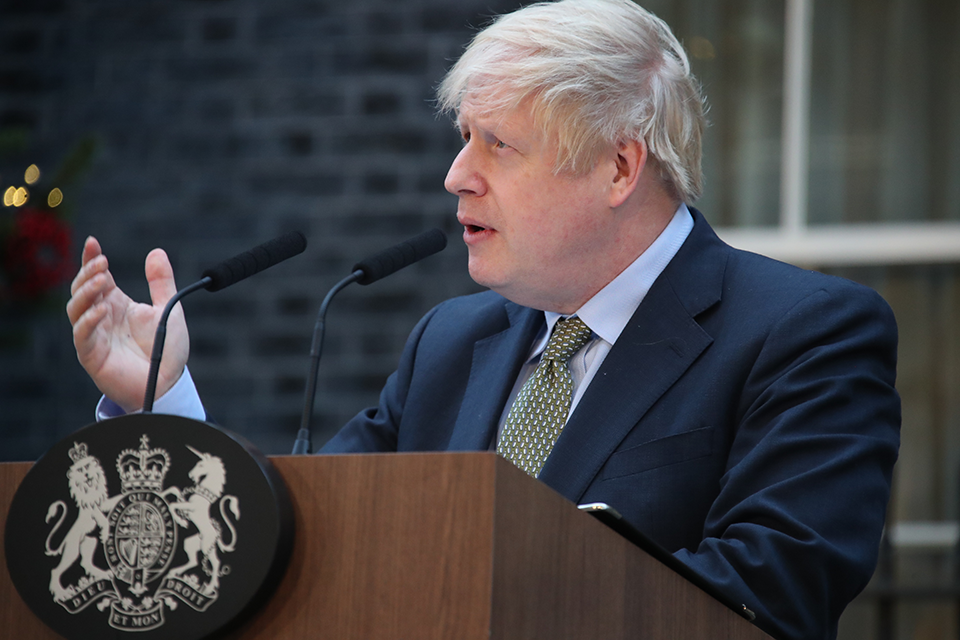
Boris Johnson speaks in front of 10 Downing Street on the day after the 2019 UK general election.

The election results had a variety of different effects and set the dynamics of UK politics going into the new decade. For the first time since the 2016 referendum it became almost certain that Brexit would take place with the process of passing the withdrawal agreement through parliament beginning before Christmas. For the Conservative Party, the election meant a shift from a fairly weak administration in the hung parliament of 2017 to 2019 to governing with a majority on a scale they had not known since the early 1990s, potentially, setting them up to remain in power for many years to come. For the Labour Party, the defeat meant an end to the leadership of Jeremy Corbyn with preparations beginning for a new leadership and deputy leadership contest in early 2020 whilst rekindling debates within the party and beyond about its tactical and ideological future. For the Liberal Democrats, Jo Swinson's unseating at the election also meant a fresh leadership election in the new year. Whilst, for the SNP, dominance in Scotland renewed hopes for a second Scottish independence referendum.

== See also ==
- Brexit
- 2010s in political history
- 2020s in United Kingdom political history
- Nigel Farage
