= Political positions of Keir Starmer =

Views and voting record of Keir Starmer

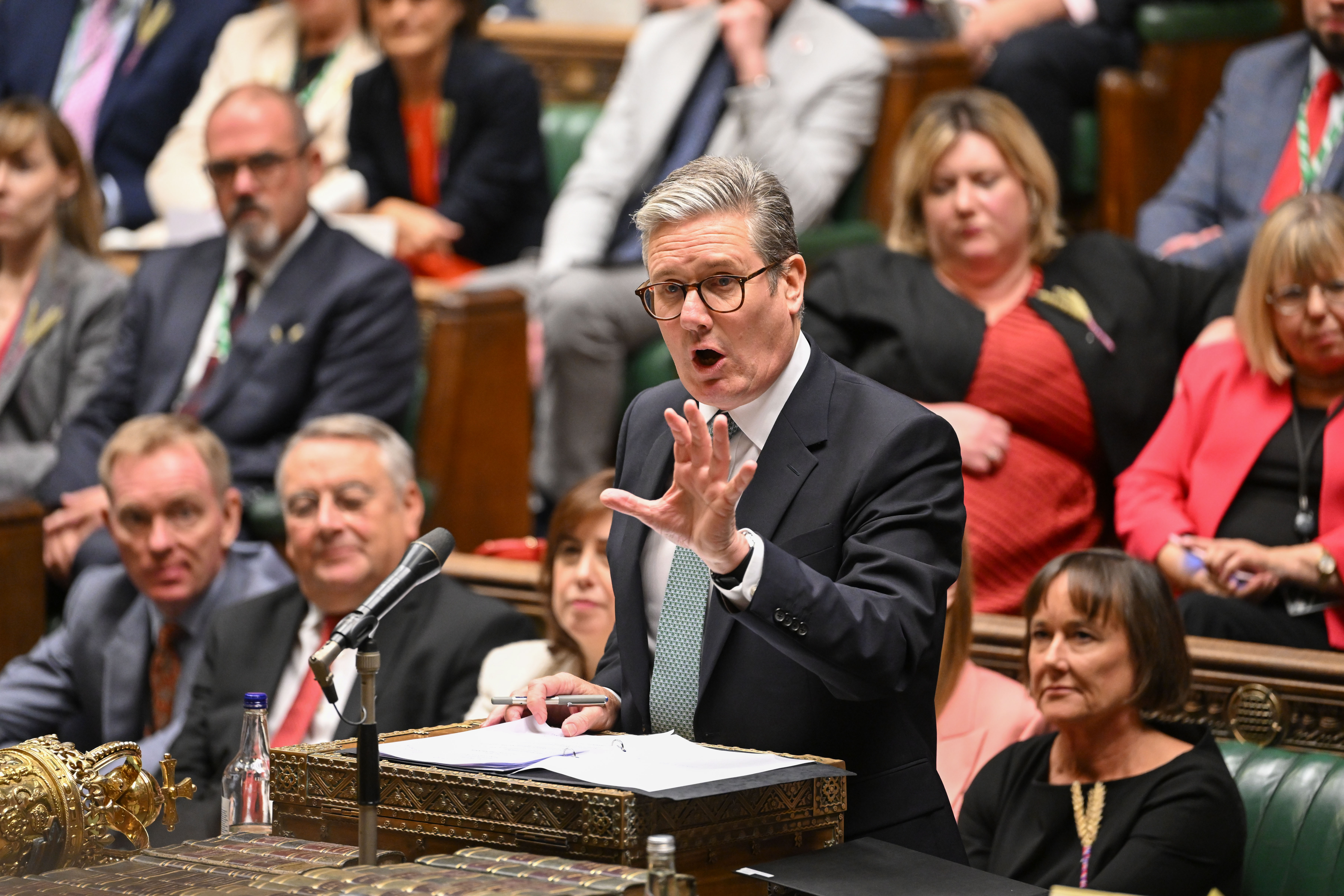
Keir Starmer at Prime Minister's Questions, 11 September 2024

The political positions of Keir Starmer, the prime minister of the United Kingdom from 2024 to 2026 and Leader of the Labour Party from 2020 to 2026, have frequently changed. Views of his political philosophy are diverse.

During the leadership of Jeremy Corbyn, Starmer adopted soft left political positions, and described his politics as being "red-green". During the 1980s and 1990s, Starmer also wrote for Socialist Alternatives and Socialist Lawyer; by the 2020s, he at times upheld and at other times rejected the socialist label. Starmer succeeded Corbyn by winning the 2020 leadership election on a left-wing platform, pledging to uphold many of his predecessor's economic policies whilst working to end the issue of antisemitism within the party.

As opposition leader and later as prime minister, Starmer was considered to have moved the Labour Party to the political centre and was criticised for breaking his 10 leadership campaign pledges. Commentators described Starmer as exhibiting an authoritarian approach, and critics on the Labour left expressed anxiety over being purged from the party under Starmer's leadership. Successor Andy Burnham described Starmer as continuing a "failed economic model" of neoliberalism and promised to "bring back hope", saying that the Burnham ministry's first few weeks had already brought "a change of pace".

== Starmerism ==
Descriptions of Keir Starmer's political philosophy are diverse. Some commentators, judging that Starmer has led his party back to the centre ground to try to improve its electability, have likened what he has accomplished in this regard to Tony Blair's development of New Labour. Starmer's Labour has been observed to have stronger ties to New Labour than recent incarnations of the party have had. Others interpret his changes of policy as evidence that he has no clearly defined philosophy at all, save a rejection of populism. Another contrasting belief is that Starmer definitively subscribes to the left end of the socialist spectrum, arguing that "Labour under Starmer has advanced a politics of anti-neoliberalism like that of Jeremy Corbyn and John McDonnell", and that Starmer "differs markedly from New Labour" in "aspiring to restructure an economic model perceived to have failed". Figures including Starmer's former boss, the barrister Geoffrey Robertson, as well as his former advisor Simon Fletcher, and the journalist and broadcaster Peter Oborne, have described Starmer as exhibiting an authoritarian approach.

Despite the lack of any consensus about the character and even existence of Starmer's ideology, it has acquired a neologism, Starmerism, and his supporters have been called Starmerites. Biographers Patrick Maguire and Gabriel Pogrund said Starmer stated "There is no such thing as Starmerism and there never will be", prioritising political pragmatism over ideology.

In April 2023, Starmer gave an interview to The Economist on defining Starmerism. In this interview, two main strands of Starmerism were identified. The first strand focused on a critique of the British state for being too ineffective and overcentralised. The answer to this critique was to base governance on five main missions to be followed over two terms of government; these missions would determine all government policy. The second strand was the adherence to an economic policy of "modern supply-side economics" based on expanding economic productivity by increasing participation in the labour market, reducing inequality, expanding skills, mitigating the impact of Brexit and simplifying the construction planning process. In June 2023, Starmer gave an interview to Time where he was asked to define Starmerism. He said: "Recognizing that our economy needs to be fixed. Recognizing that [solving] climate change isn't just an obligation; it's the single biggest opportunity that we've got for our country going forward. Recognizing that public services need to be reformed, that every child and every place should have the best opportunities and that we need a safe environment, safe streets, et cetera."

== Relationship to socialism ==
=== Early radical period ===
Starmer wrote articles for the magazines Socialist Alternatives and Socialist Lawyer as a young man in the 1980s and 1990s. In July 1986, Starmer wrote in the first issue of Socialist Alternatives that trade unions should have had control over the "industry and community". He wrote in Socialist Lawyer that "Karl Marx was, of course, right" in saying it was pointless to believe a change of society could only be achieved by arguing about fundamental rights.

Gavin Millar, a former legal colleague of Starmer, has described his politics during this period as "red-green", a characterisation Starmer has agreed with. During the leadership of Jeremy Corbyn, Starmer adopted soft left political positions whilst describing his politics as being "red-green".

=== Evolution to the centre ===
Starmer succeeded Corbyn by winning the 2020 leadership election on a left-wing platform, pledging to uphold many of his predecessor's economic policies whilst working to end the issue of antisemitism within the party. In a January 2020 interview during his leadership campaign, Starmer described himself as a socialist, and stated in an opinion piece published by The Guardian the same month that his advocacy of socialism is motivated by "a burning desire to tackle inequality and injustice".

As opposition leader, Starmer moved Labour toward the political centre. In an interview with the i's Francis Elliott in December 2021, Starmer refused to characterise himself as a socialist, asking "What does that mean?" He added: "The Labour Party is a party that believes that we get the best from each other when we come together, collectively, and ensure that you know, we give people both opportunity and support as they needed."

In 2023, Starmer removed the ten socialism-based pledges that he had made in the 2020 party leadership contest from his website, after having abandoned or rolled back on many of these, citing the COVID-19 pandemic and the economic situation as reasons for having to "adapt". Critics on the Labour left complained of being purged from the party under Starmer's leadership.

In the run-up to the 2024 general election, Starmer told the BBC: "I would describe myself as a socialist. I describe myself as a progressive. I'd describe myself as somebody who always puts the country first and party second."

=== Analysis and commentary ===
Views of Keir Starmer's political philosophy are diverse. Some commentators, judging that Starmer has led his party back to the centre ground to try to improve its electability, have likened what he has accomplished in this regard to Tony Blair's development of New Labour.

Others interpret his changes of policy as evidence that he has no clearly defined philosophy at all, save a rejection of populism. The Economist noted that "while it is hard to define what Sir Keir stands for politically, it is clear what he isn't: a populist".

Another contrasting belief is that Starmer definitively subscribes to the left end of the socialist spectrum, with academic analysis arguing that "Labour under Starmer has advanced a politics of anti-neoliberalism like that of Jeremy Corbyn and John McDonnell", and that Starmer "differs markedly from New Labour" in "aspiring to restructure an economic model perceived to have failed". Figures including Starmer's former boss, the barrister Geoffrey Robertson, as well as his former advisor Simon Fletcher, and the journalist and broadcaster Peter Oborne, have described Starmer as exhibiting an authoritarian approach.

A 2025 pre-Labour conference Guardian editorial stated Starmer now generally took an Anglo-American rather than a European position, and had tellingly referenced the American centrist Abundance book and buzzword for developing prosperity by deregulation, rapid infrastructure development and market-led growth, without emphasising redistribution of income and wealth.

Despite the lack of any consensus about the character and even existence of Starmer's ideology, it has acquired a neologism, Starmerism, and his supporters have been called Starmerites. Adam Bienkov writing in Byline Times said of Andy Burnham's first cabinet in July 2026 following Starmer's resignation as Prime Minister that "At best it represents Starmerism without Starmer".

== Domestic issues ==
=== Reform of public institutions ===
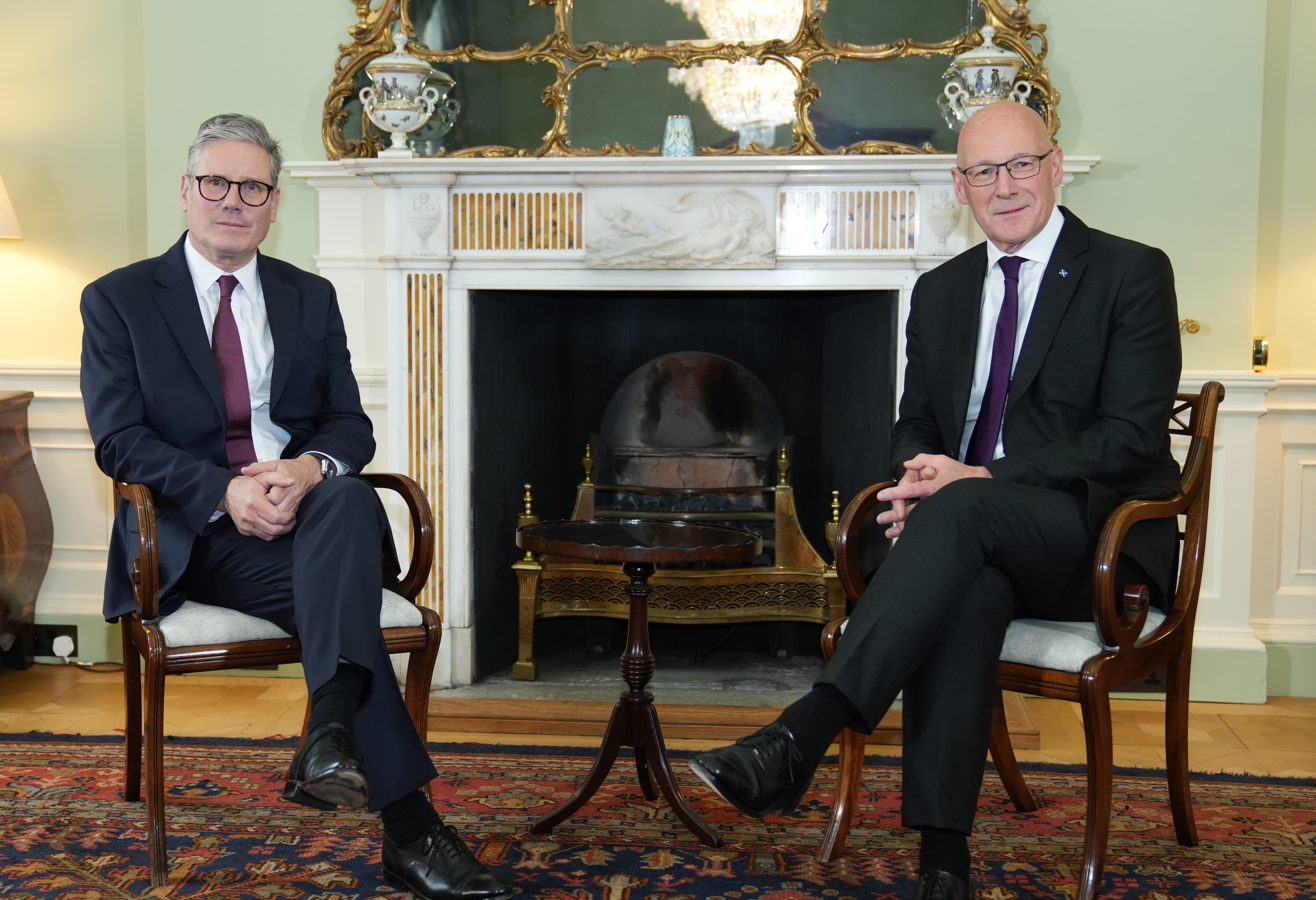
Starmer meets with Scottish First Minister John Swinney at Bute House.

Starmer has repeatedly emphasised the reform of public institutions (against a tax and spend approach), localism, and devolution. He has pledged to abolish the House of Lords, which he has described as "indefensible", during the first term of a Labour government and to replace it with a directly elected Assembly of the Regions and Nations, the details of which will be subject to public consultation. He criticised the Conservative Party for handing peerages to "cronies and donors".

Upon becoming leader of the Labour Party, Starmer tasked former Labour prime minister Gordon Brown with recommending British constitutional reforms. The report was published in 2022 and was endorsed and promoted by Starmer, and recommended the abolition of the House of Lords, extending greater powers to local councils and mayors, and deeper devolution to the countries of the UK. Labour's 2024 election manifesto Change committed to the removal of the remaining hereditary peers from the chamber, setting a mandatory retirement age of 80, and beginning a consultation on replacing the Lords with a "more representative" body.

Starmer favours Britain's current first-past-the-post voting system and opposes proposals for electoral reform, such as the adoption of proportional representation (PR), although he has expressed support for PR in the past. In December 2024, he declined to provide debate time for Sarah Olney's Ten Minute Rule bill on PR as "not our policy". He has been criticised for his attitude to the issue of Britain's voting system, including by McDonnell, who accused him of acting like a monarch.

=== Public services ===
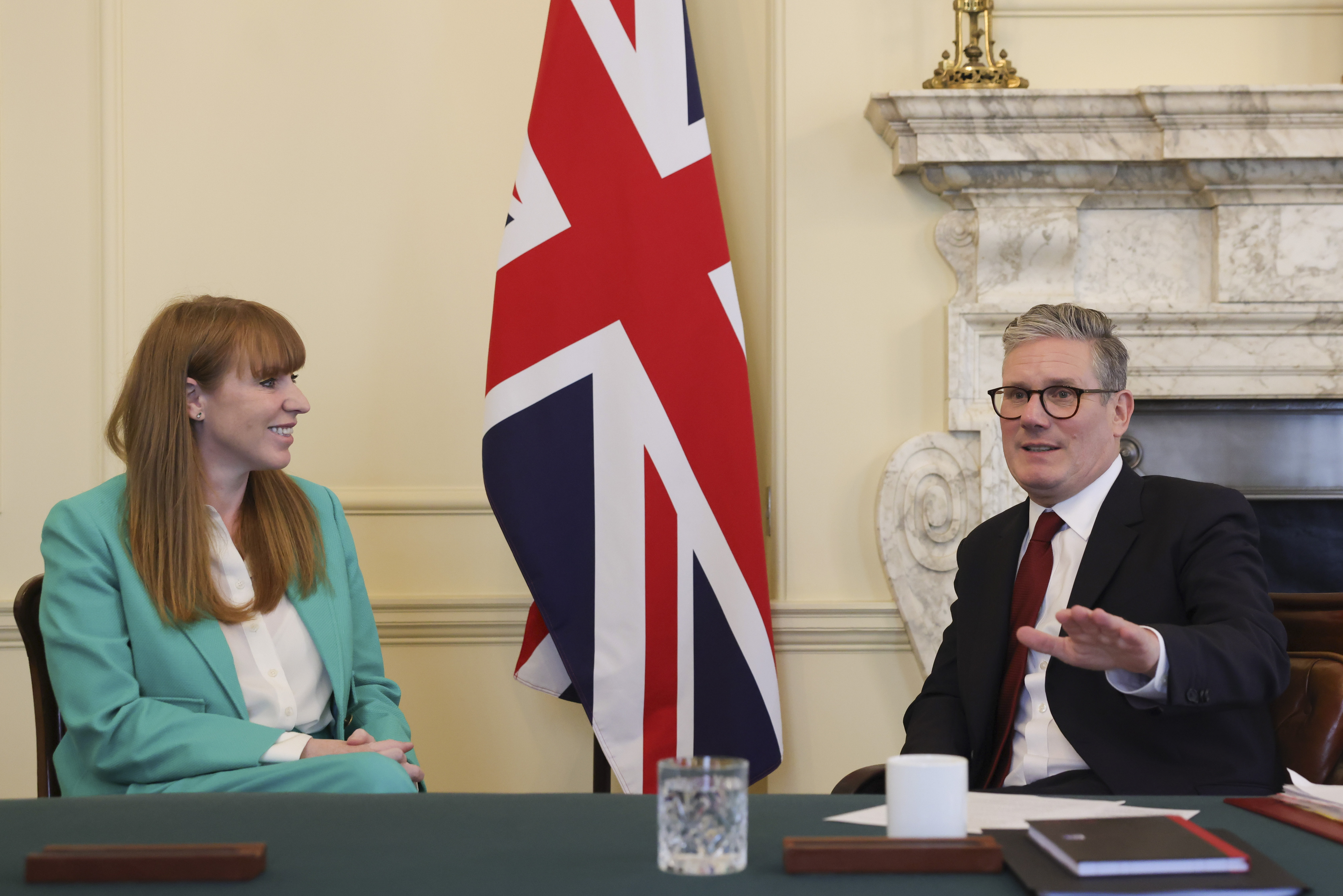
Starmer with Deputy Prime Minister Angela Rayner, 6 July 2024

Starmer supports social ownership and investment in the UK's public services, including the National Health Service (NHS). During the 2020 Labour leadership election, he pledged to increase income tax for the top 5% of earners and to end corporate tax avoidance; he receded from the income tax commitment in 2023. He advocates the reversal of the Conservative Party's cuts in corporation tax and supported Labour's anti-austerity proposals under Corbyn's leadership. On social inequality, Starmer proposes "national wellbeing indicators" to measure the country's performance on health, inequality, homelessness, and the natural environment. He has called for an "overhaul" of the UK's Universal Credit scheme.

Opposing Scottish independence and a second referendum on the subject, the Labour Party under Starmer's leadership has set up a constitutional convention to address what he describes as a belief among people across the UK that "decisions about me should be taken closer to me". Starmer is against the reunification of Ireland, having stated that he would be "very much on the side of Unionists" if there were to be a border poll.

=== Healthcare ===
In Government, Starmer reaffirmed the outgoing Conservative government's commitment of no new HIV cases in the United Kingdom by 2030. On 10 February 2025 Starmer, alongside the singer and HIV activist Beverley Knight and the Terrence Higgins Trust chief executive Richard Angell, recorded himself taking a rapid HIV home test. This made Starmer the first serving British prime minister and serving leader of a G7 nation to take a test on camera.

=== Economy ===
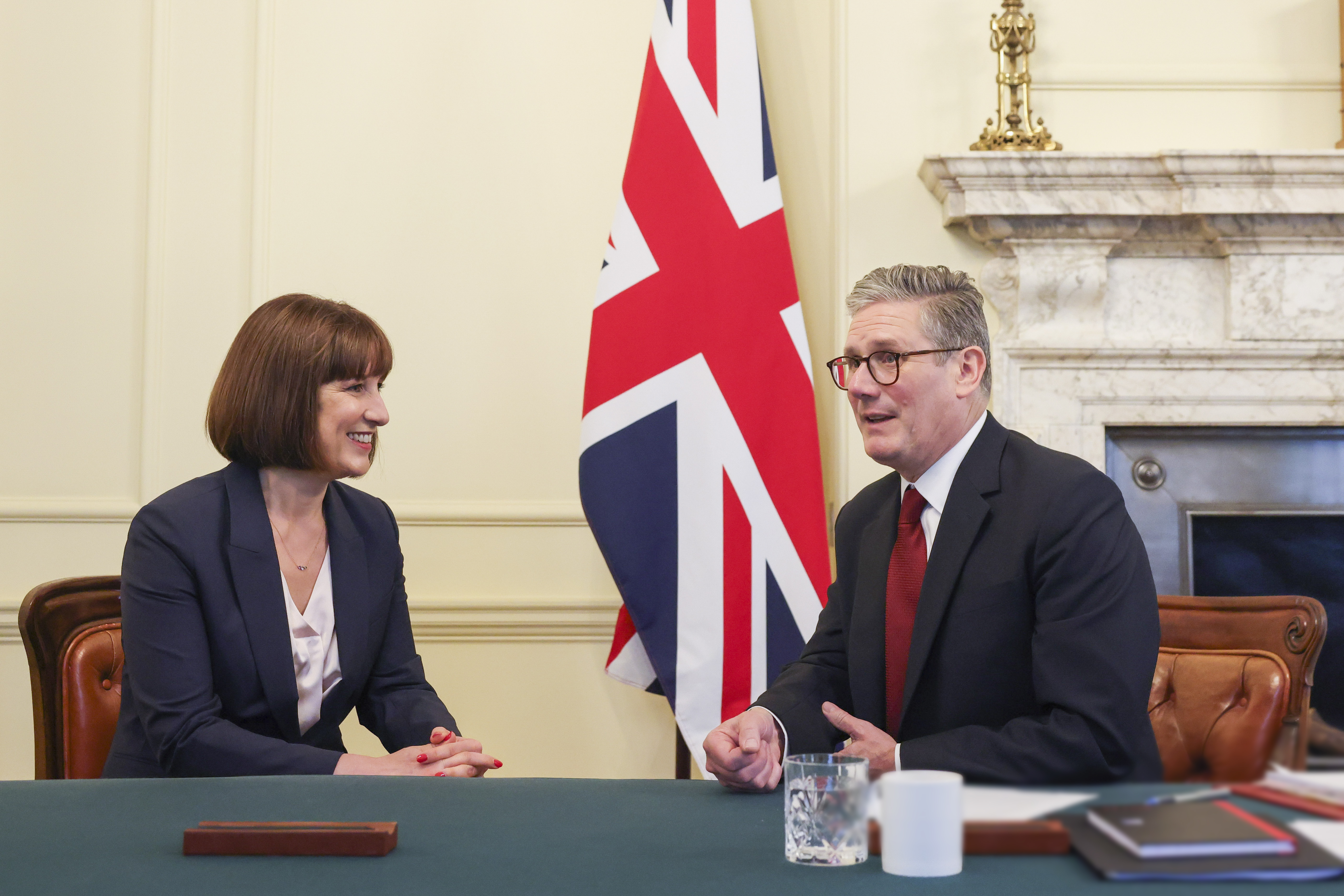
Keir Starmer with his chancellor, Rachel Reeves, 6 July 2024

Starmer strongly favours green policies to tackle climate change and decarbonise the British economy. He has committed to eliminate fossil fuels from the UK electricity grid by 2030. In 2021, Starmer and then Shadow Chancellor Rachel Reeves pledged that a Labour government would invest an extra £28 billion a year in green industries; in June 2023 this was changed to £28 billion per year by the middle of their first term of government.

Since 2022, Reeves has adhered to "modern supply-side economics", an economic policy which focuses on infrastructure, education and labour supply by rejecting tax cuts and deregulation. In 2023, Reeves coined the term "securonomics" to refer to her version of this economic policy. On taking office as Chancellor of the Exchequer in 2024, Reeves stated that since there is "not a huge amount of money" her focus will be on "unlocking" private-sector investment, as she believes "private-sector investment is the lifeblood of a successful economy."

Starmer and Reeves have been described as pursuing military Keynesianism, aiming to boost GDP by increasing the military budget while cutting welfare.

Starmer has written to UK regulators, including Ofgem and Ofwat, urging them to propose reforms to foster economic growth. The letter emphasizes collaboration to create a "pro-growth and pro-investment" regulatory environment while respecting the independence of these bodies.

=== Immigration ===
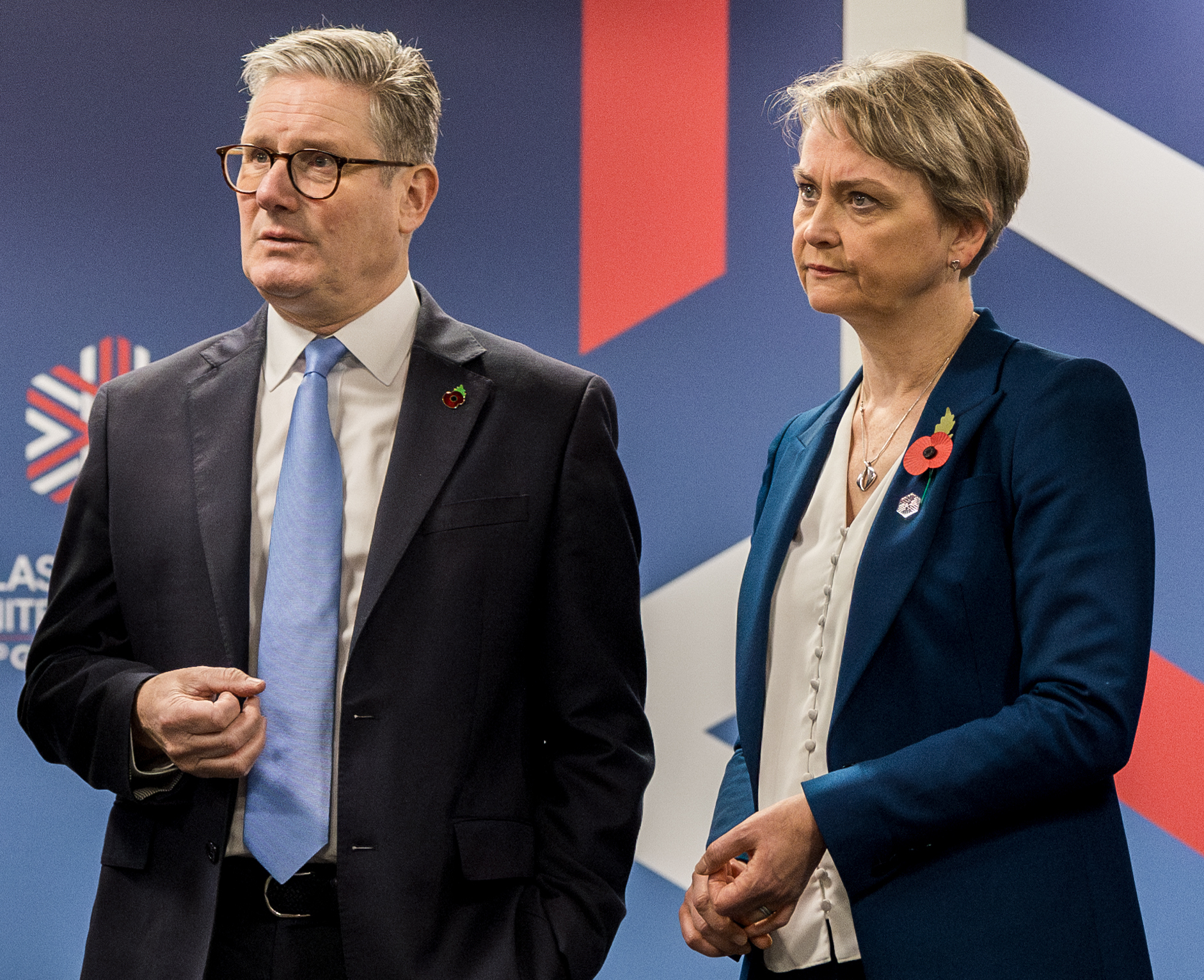
Starmer with then Home Secretary Yvette Cooper

Starmer's position on immigration has changed over time. In his maiden speech in Parliament in 2015, Starmer challenged proposals to replace the Human Rights Act with a new "British Bill of Rights", telling the Commons: "As we now celebrate the 800th anniversary of Magna Carta, let us affirm the principle that human rights apply to everyone equally. Any proposed British Bill of Rights inconsistent with that principle will not be worth the paper it is written on and will face widespread opposition, not least from me on behalf of my constituents in Holborn and St Pancras."

In the 2020 Labour Party leadership election, Starmer pledged to campaign for the return of free movement with the EU after Brexit, stating: "We need to make the wider case on immigration. We welcome migrants, we don't scapegoat them. Low wages, poor housing, poor public services, are not the fault of people who come here: they're political failure. So we have to make the case for the benefits of migration, for the benefits of free movement. I want people in this country to be able to go and work abroad, in Europe; and I want people in Europe to be able to come and work here. I want families to be able to live together – whether that's in Europe, or here." He also demanded "full voting rights for EU nationals" and called for an immigration system "based on compassion and dignity" and an end to "indefinite detention", along with the closure of migrant removal centres such as Yarl's Wood Immigration Removal Centre. He would ultimately scrap the EU voting pledge four years later. Starmer also tried to block plans to deport dozens of foreign criminals to Jamaica; in government he would announce a plan to curb judges' powers to block deportations.

At the Labour Party Conference in September 2022, Starmer claimed to have made the case that taking back control of Britain's borders was a "Labour argument", saying: "I will make work pay for the people who create this country's wealth. I will make sure we buy, make and sell more in Britain. I will revitalise public services and control immigration using a points-based system. I will spread power and opportunity to all our communities. And I will never be shy to use the power of government to help working people succeed." He also warned that the UK faced backlogs at its borders. In November 2022, Starmer called for an end to "the days when low pay and cheap labour are part of the British way on growth", stating "Our common goal must be to help the British economy off its immigration dependency to start investing more in training workers who are already here. Migration is part of our national story – always has been, always will be and the Labour Party will never diminish the contribution it makes to our economy, to public services, to your businesses and our communities. But let me tell you – the days when low pay and cheap labour are part of the British way on growth must end. This isn't about Brexit. All around the world, business is waking up to the fact we live in a new era for labour." In September 2023, Starmer pledged to be "ruthless" with his plans to fix the English Channel migrant crossings, referencing his record as director of public prosecutions when he said he "delivered" on attempts to protect the British public from dangerous criminals, stating: "My Labour government will be ruthless in our plan to smash criminal smuggling gangs and secure our borders. As director of public prosecutions, I went after dangerous criminals to protect the British public. And I delivered. I'll do it again." The pledge to "smash the gangs" became a hallmark of Labour's 2024 general election campaign, although a crackdown on immigration did not feature in the party's five core "missions".

In June 2024, Starmer pledged to reduce record high legal immigration to the UK, saying, "Read my lips – I will bring immigration numbers down. If you trust me with the keys to No 10, I will make you this promise: I will control our borders and make sure British businesses are helped to hire Brits first." Starmer aims to reduce net migration by improving training and skills for British workers and establishing Skills England. The Border Security Command was first proposed in a speech by Starmer in May 2024. The party planned to create a new border security command if it entered government. The command would be responsible for tackling the ongoing crisis of illegal migrant crossings on the English Channel by coordinating the activities of government agencies such as MI5 in prosecuting people smuggling gangs which facilitate illegal immigration to the United Kingdom. The command was proposed as Labour's alternative to the Rwanda asylum plan of the Conservative government, which the party claimed would fail to tackle the migrant crossings across the Channel and criticised as a waste of money. The command was further detailed in Change, the Labour Party's manifesto for the 2024 general election, as one of its main manifesto commitments. In the manifesto, the party pledged to establish the command with counter-terrorism powers to enable it to prosecute people smugglers should it enter government. It would be funded by ending the Rwanda asylum plan and reallocating the money pledged for the plan to the command, which the party said would enable it to "pursue, disrupt and arrest those responsible for the vile trade". Starmer said he wanted to raise around £75 million from the defunct plan each year to fund the command. Following Labour's victory in the 2024 general election and the formation of the Starmer ministry on 5 July, the new Labour government scrapped the Rwanda asylum plan on the day it entered office. On 7 July, the new home secretary Yvette Cooper launched the Border Security Command (BSC) to replace the plan, accompanied by an audit into the money already granted to the Rwandan government through the plan to see if the UK government could take it back, as well as new counter-terrorism legislation which would be drawn up in the coming weeks to tackle illegal immigration. The command would be funded by money previously earmarked for the Rwanda plan and would be responsible for coordinating the activities of Immigration Enforcement, MI5, the Border Force and the National Crime Agency in tackling smuggling gangs which facilitate illegal migrant crossings over the English Channel. The new office of Border Security Commander was also established, whose remit would be to lead the new command and its members, with the government expecting the appointment of the first officeholder to be made in the coming weeks. A team in the Home Office was tasked with setting out the remit of the command, as well as its governance structure and its strategic direction.

In May 2025, following Reform UK's electoral success at the local elections, Starmer gave a press conference where he promised a significant fall in net migration by the end of the parliament and unveiled plans to curb judges' powers to block deportations under the European Convention on Human Rights (ECHR). Starmer promised to reduce the number of migrants coming to the UK "significantly", stating: "Make no mistake, this plan means migration will fall. That is a promise." Starmer refused to commit to an annual cap or target as he argued such an approach would not be "sensible". Asked to give voters more than just a promise, he said: "We do want to significantly reduce migration. I am absolutely making clear that is what it will do and that if we need to go further, we will." He also cast doubt on any threat from Reform's electoral success, claiming: "I know on a day like today, people who like politics will try to make this all about politics, about this or that strategy, targeting these voters, responding to that party. No. I am doing this because it is right, because it is fair and because it is what I believe in." Starmer's line "we risk becoming an island of strangers" when discussing tighter immigration controls was criticised by media outlets as echoing Enoch Powell's "strangers in their own country" line from his "rivers of blood" speech. He was also criticised for using the phrase "take back control" five times, which had been used as Vote Leave's slogan during the 2016 European Union membership referendum. Reform UK leader Nigel Farage accused Starmer of being "insincere" and warned he was "playing catch up" on the issue of immigration, stating "I was using take back control in 2004. Keir Starmer has spent his whole career campaigning for free movement of people wholly unconcerned about this subject, so much so that their massive parliamentary majority was gained without immigration even being one of their five main priorities. Now, of course, he knows that amongst the great British public, this issue rates even higher than the health service. And he's just basically playing catch up with Reform."

=== Education ===
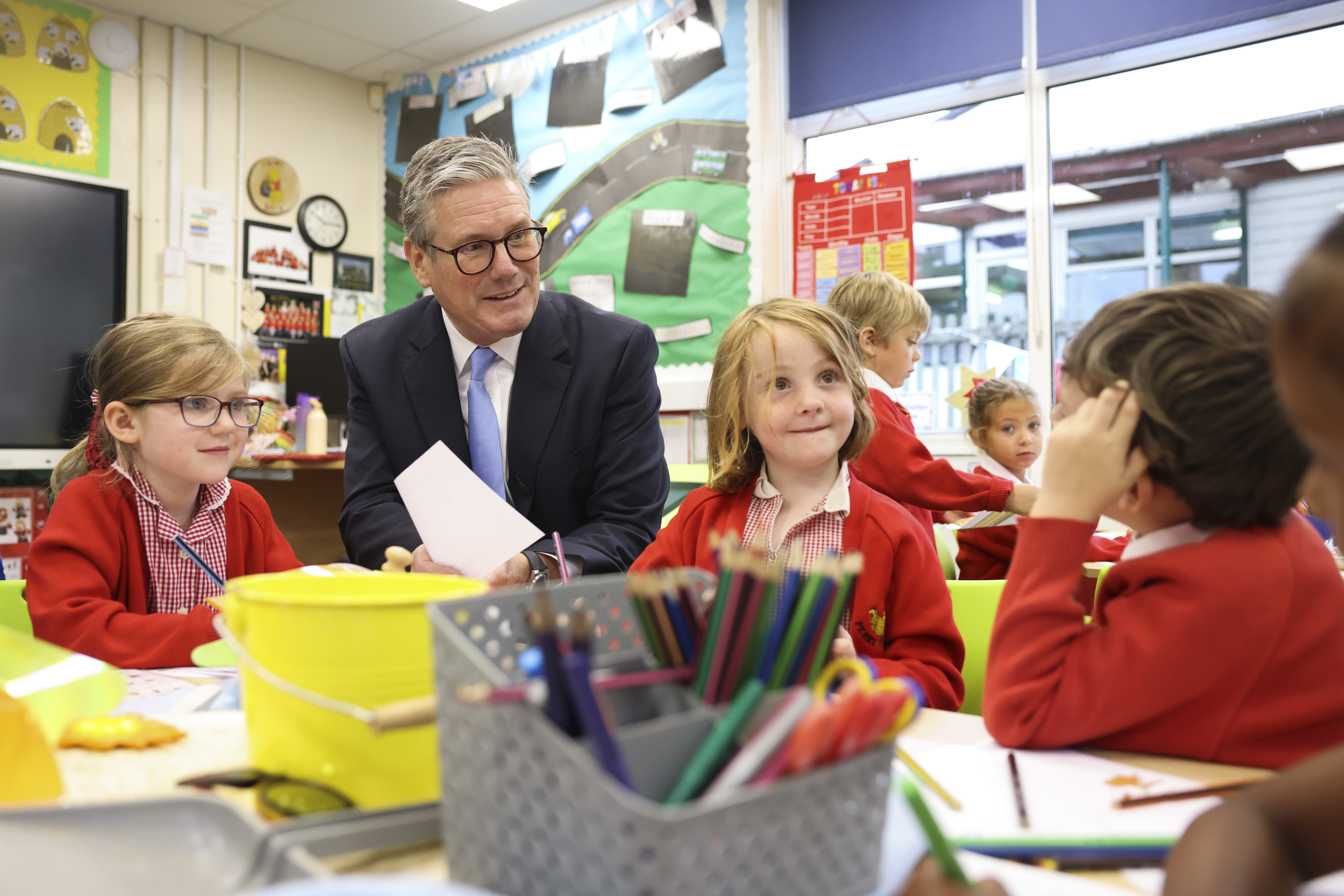
Starmer visiting primary school children in Orpington, September 2024

Starmer vowed in 2021 and 2022 to strip independent schools of their VAT-exempt charitable status, a move opposed by the Independent Schools Council. During the 2020 Labour leadership election, Starmer pledged to scrap university tuition fees; he dropped this pledge in May 2023, citing a "different financial situation" following Liz Truss' premiership. Starmer instead said that he aimed to reform the tuition fee system, which he said was unfair to both students and universities. He is supportive of faith schools, and said he would not change policy on faith schools. He has ruled out extending free school meals to all primary school pupils in England, instead pledging to extend breakfast clubs including free breakfasts for every primary school in England.

=== Public ownership over national infrastructure ===
Starmer's position on public ownership over national infrastructure has changed over time. In the 2020 Labour Party leadership election, Starmer ran on a pledge to renationalise rail, mail, water, and energy back into common ownership; he dropped this pledge in July 2022 and said he would take a "pragmatic approach" to public ownership. As of September 2023, he remained committed to renationalising the railways and local bus services, the creation of a publicly owned energy company, and stricter regulation of water companies. Starmer favours partnership between government and business, having said: "A political party without a clear plan for making sure businesses are successful and growing ... which doesn't want them to do well and make a profit ... has no hope of being a successful government."

=== Child poverty ===
Starmer and Reeves refused to scrap the benefit cap introduced by the Cameron–Clegg coalition, citing financial reasons. The cap was introduced in 2013 as part of the coalition government's wide-reaching welfare reform agenda which included the introduction of Universal Credit and reforms of housing benefit and disability benefits. Starmer's government cited wide public support for the measure, despite it being highly controversial. By 2024, the year Starmer and Reeves entered government, two-thirds of the families affected by the cap were single-parent families, half of which had a child under five. Starmer launched a Child Poverty Taskforce, in which expert officials from across government would work together on how best to support more than four-million children living in poverty.

=== LGBTQ+ and transgender rights ===
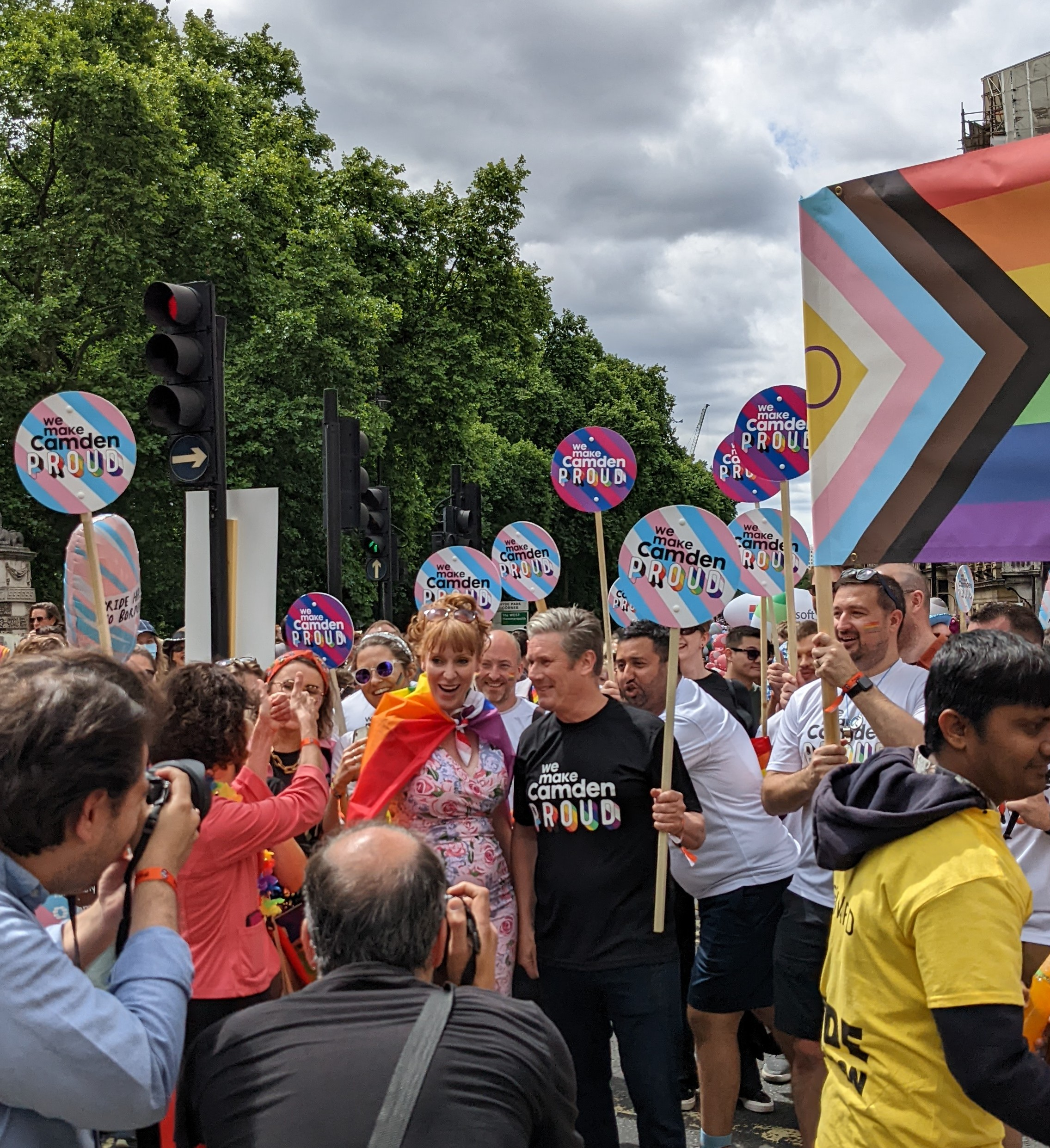
Starmer at a Pride parade with Anneliese Dodds and Angela Rayner in 2022

Starmer supports some LGBTQ+ rights, including strengthening protections against hate crimes targeting members of the LGBTQ community, and "modernizing" the "intrusive and outdated" gender recognition framework, and a proposed, "trans-inclusive" ban on conversion therapy. After taking office, the Labour Party announced a fully trans-inclusive conversion therapy ban as part of the King's Speech. However, "no solid plans have emerged" as of May 2025. Instead, while initially indicating support for transgender rights in 2022, Starmer has since indicated that the definition of a woman only includes "biological women".

In 2021, Starmer criticised Rosie Duffield, then a Labour candidate, for saying that only women have a cervix, stating that her comments were "something that shouldn't be said. It is not right." When asked in 2024 whether he would apologise to Duffield, Starmer said: "I think it's very important, in all political space, that we treat all views with respect and all people with dignity and that's what I tried to do throughout this. I'm very proud of the progress that we've made as a Labour party in government in the past when it comes to women's rights. I'm conscious that the battle for women's rights is never over. We need to make further progress in this country."

In March 2022, Starmer stated "trans women are women" in his personal opinion at the time and according to British law. His comments were criticised by author J. K. Rowling, whose outspoken gender-critical views are often described as transphobic or anti-trans. Rowling accused Starmer of misrepresenting the law and said "the Labour Party can no longer be counted on to defend women's rights".

In February 2024, in response to Starmer's alleged backtracking on "defining a woman" at Prime Minister's Questions, then prime minister Rishi Sunak said that "in fairness, that was only 99% of a U-turn", referring to previous comments made by Starmer that "99.9% of women" do not have a penis. This comment was made on the same day that the mother of murdered transgender teenager Brianna Ghey was present at the Commons.

Starmer responded by criticising Sunak for including such remarks whilst Ghey's mother was "in this chamber". The comment was criticised by LGBT groups including Stonewall and relatives of Ghey. In response to Ghey's father's request for an apology, Sunak said it was Starmer's linking the comments to the murder that was "the worst of politics".

Esther Ghey, who was not in the public gallery to hear Sunak's remark, later declined requests for comment, stating she was concentrating on "creating a lasting legacy" for her daughter. Both Sunak and Starmer faced criticism over the exchange. Sunak's response was described by some media outlets as a joke and was criticised by opposition MPs and some Conservatives. Starmer's response was criticised by then minister for women and equalities, Kemi Badenoch, who said it showed Labour were "happy to weaponise" Ghey's murder.

In a 22 June 2024 statement ahead of the 2024 general election, Starmer responded to a question by Rowling asking whether transgender women with a gender recognition certificate have the right to use women-only spaces. Starmer replied: "No. They don't have that right. They shouldn't".

Rowling subsequently expressed a "poor opinion" of Starmer's character, claiming he was "dismissive and often offensive" towards women's concerns about sex-based rights. She stated she would struggle to vote for Labour "as long as [it] remains dismissive and often offensive towards women fighting to retain [their] rights". Starmer responded by saying: "I do respect her, but I would point out the long record that Labour has in government of passing really important legislation which has advanced the rights of women and made a material difference. That fight is never over. Those challenges are never over. We need to make further progress when it comes to women's rights."

On transgender rights, Starmer said his Labour government would seek a "reset moment where we can bring the country together and ensure that all debate is done in a respectful way". During a Question Time debate in June 2024, Starmer agreed with former Labour prime minister Tony Blair, who said that "biologically, a woman is with a vagina and a man is with a penis".

Rowling accused Starmer of failing to support Duffield, writing: "It seems Rosie has received literally no support from Starmer over the threats and abuse, some of which has originated from within the Labour party itself, and has had a severe, measurable impact on her life." She argued that Starmer's debate comments implied "something unkind, something toxic, something hardline, in Rosie's words, even though almost identical words had sounded perfectly reasonable when spoken by Tony Blair". Rowling stated: "For left-leaning women like us, this isn't, and never has been, about trans people enjoying the rights of every other citizen, and being free to present and identify however they wish. This is about the right of women and girls to assert their boundaries. It's about freedom of speech and observable truth."

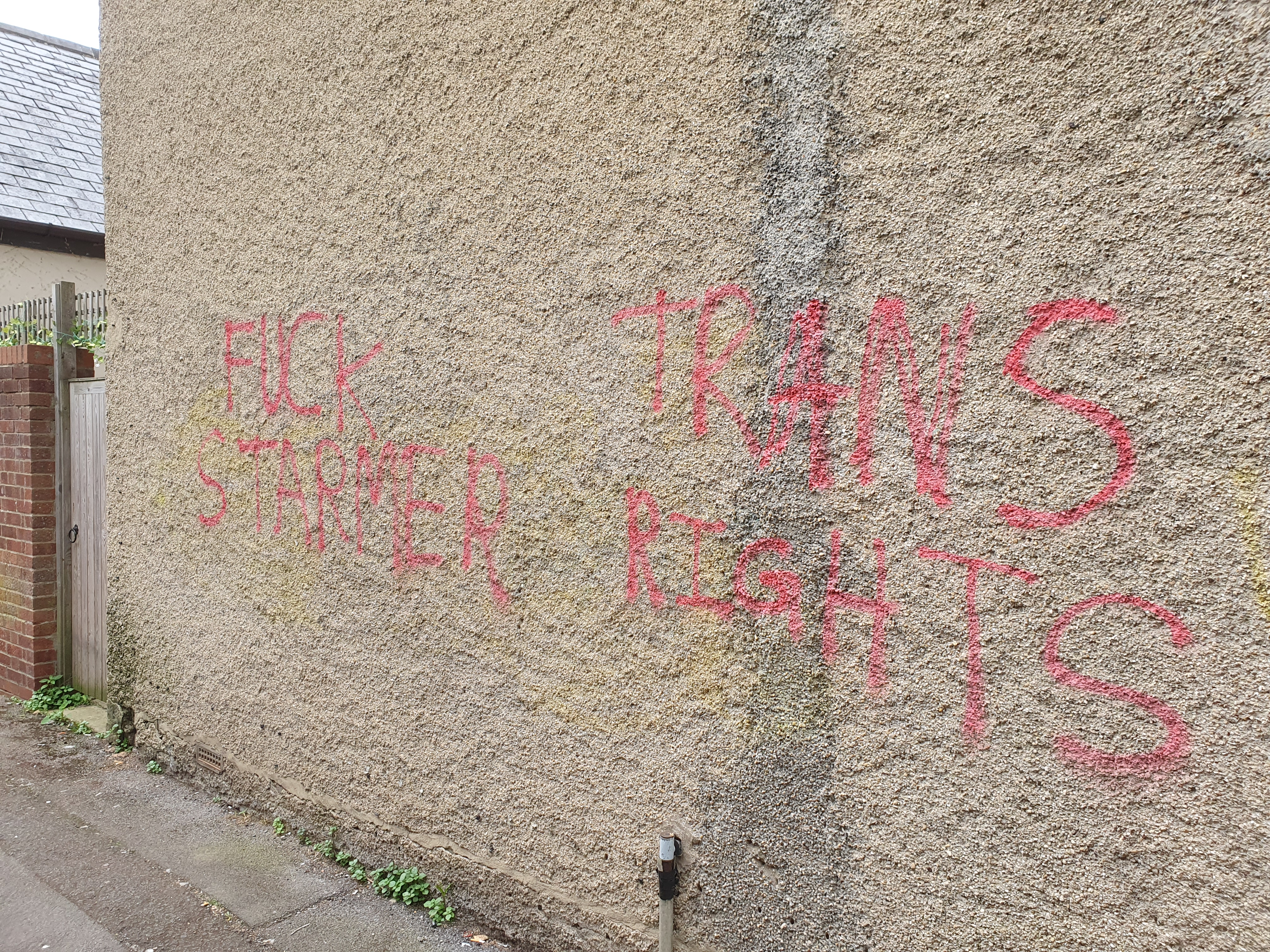
Graffiti in Oxford reading "Fuck Starmer, Trans Rights", April 2025

In a July 2024 interview with The Times, Starmer supported the view that transgender women could be refused entry to women-only spaces, as set out in existing Equality Act provisions. He also stated that the party would implement the recommendations of the Cass Review "in full"; these recommendations faced criticism from UK LGBTQ+ rights charities such as Stonewall and Mermaids. Starmer also ruled out allowing transgender people to self-ID. He said he would continue the block on the Gender Recognition Reform Bill in Scotland, which had originally been blocked in 2023 during Sunak's premiership.

On 22 April 2025, Starmer issued a statement through a spokesperson indicating that he no longer believed transgender women could be considered women. The statement specified that his views were in accordance with the Supreme Court ruling For Women Scotland Ltd v The Scottish Ministers, issued on 16 April, which unanimously ruled that the definition of women in the Equality Act 2010 constituted only "biological women".

Starmer stated: "A woman is an adult female, and the court has made that absolutely clear", adding: "I actually welcome the judgment because I think it gives real clarity". A government spokesperson stated the ruling had brought "clarity and confidence" for women and service providers, adding that "single-sex spaces are protected in law and will always be protected by this government".

Labour minister for women and equalities Bridget Phillipson said transgender women should use male facilities, listing toilets, hospitals, shelters and rape crisis centres as examples.

LGBT+ Labour expressed being "deeply disappointed" by the judgement, stating it "risks undermining trans people's access to vital services, workplaces, and spaces where they have long been included" at a time when transgender people are "already facing rising levels of hate crime, hostility, and misinformation". The organisation stated it stands "in full solidarity" with the trans community.

Opposition leader Badenoch criticised Starmer's response, describing the judgment as a "victory for all of the women who faced personal abuse or lost their jobs for stating the obvious", and declaring that "the era of Keir Starmer telling us women can have penises has come to an end".

In September 2025, Starmer appointed Tim Allan, a trustee of anti-trans rights lobbying group Sex Matters, as the government's executive director of communications, prompting protest from LGBT rights groups Stonewall and the Good Law Project.

Since Starmer took over as leader, transgender support for the Labour Party has fallen to record lows, with some polling suggesting 91% of transgender people distrust Labour.

=== Violence against women and girls ===
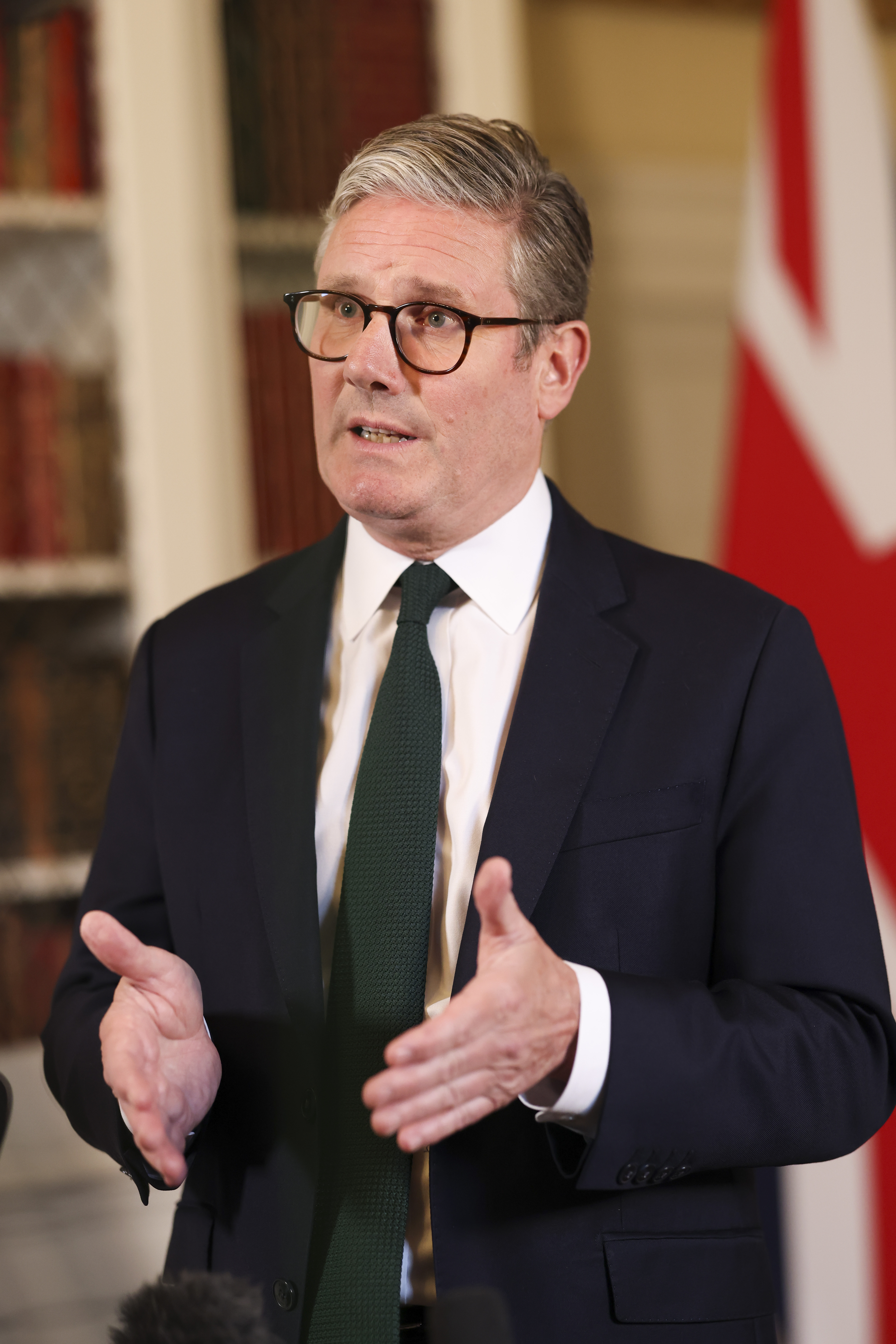
Starmer speaks to the media following an earlier Cobra meeting to discuss the violent disorder across the country, 6 August 2024

In the wake of the murder of Sarah Everard in March 2021, Starmer called for longer sentences for rape and sexual violence. Starmer said he wants crime reduced, maintaining that "too many people do not feel safe in their streets".

He has pledged to halve the rates of violence against women and girls, halve the rates of serious violent crime, halve the incidents of knife crime, and increase confidence in the criminal justice system. He also committed to creating a 'Charging Commission' which would be "tasked with coming up with reforms to reverse the decline in the number of offences being solved". Additionally, he committed to placing specialist domestic violence workers in the control rooms of every police force responding to 999 calls to support victims of abuse. Starmer said the New Labour government was right to be "tough on crime, tough on the causes of crime".

Following the 2024 Southport stabbing in which Axel Rudakubana killed three children and injured ten others – eight of whom were children at a Taylor Swift–themed yoga and dance workshop, Starmer described the murders as horrendous and shocking and thanked emergency services for their swift response.

Amid the riots across the country following the stabbing, Starmer wrote that those who had "hijacked the vigil for the victims" had "insulted the community as it grieves" and that rioters would feel the full force of the law. On 1 August, following a meeting with senior police officers, Starmer announced the establishment of a national violent disorder programme to facilitate greater cooperation between police forces when dealing with violent disorder.

On 4 August, Starmer said that rioters "will feel the full force of the law" and told them: "You will regret taking part in this, whether directly or those whipping up this action online and then running away themselves". He added: "I won't shy away from calling it what it is – far-right thuggery". Starmer later called an emergency response meeting of Cobra. After the Cobra meeting, he announced the establishment of a "standing army" of specialist police officers to address the violence and help bring it to an end.

After Starmer said "large social media companies and those who run them" were contributing to the disorder, the American businessman and political figure Elon Musk, the owner of Twitter, criticised him for not condemning all participants in the riots and only blaming the far-right. Musk also responded to a tweet which said the riots were due to "mass migration and open borders" by tweeting "Civil war is inevitable". His comments were condemned by Starmer's official spokesman. Musk further said Starmer was responsible for a "two-tier" policing system which did not protect all communities in the United Kingdom and subsequently shared a conspiracy theory that Starmer's government was planning to build detainment camps in the Falkland Islands to hold far-right rioters. In response, Starmer said: "My focus is on ensuring our communities are safe. That is my sole focus. I think it's very important for us all to support the police in what they're doing".

After Rudakubana's guilty plea on 20 January 2025, Cooper announced a public inquiry, stating that the victims' families "needed answers about what had happened leading up to the attack". This was followed by Starmer's promise to overhaul terrorism laws to reflect the type of non-ideological killings characterised by individuals like Rudakubana, stressing the threat from "acts of extreme violence perpetrated by loners, misfits, young men in their bedroom, accessing all manner of material online, desperate for notoriety, sometimes inspired by traditional terrorist groups, but fixated on that extreme violence, seemingly for its own sake". Significant attention was drawn to Prevent for failing to accept referrals of Rudakubana on the basis of him lacking a terrorist ideology. Although an emergency review found that Prevent had followed correct procedures on each referral, Cooper concluded "that too much weight was placed on the absence of ideology" in the programme. Cooper announced that there would be a review on the threshold at which Prevent intervenes, with senior lawyer David Anderson being assigned by Starmer as the Independent Prevent Commissioner to perform the review.

In response to Badenoch criticising the government for not launching a public inquiry into historic child abuse by grooming gangs and Musk suggesting that the prime minister was complicit in child sexual exploitation, Starmer said the Conservatives had failed to implement the recommendations of the 2022 Independent Inquiry into Child Sexual Abuse (IICSA). Starmer stated that under his leadership, the CPS had "the highest number of child sexual abuse cases being prosecuted on record". He accused politicians and activists of "spreading lies and misinformation" over grooming gangs to appeal to the far-right. In a detailed response, he said: "When politicians, and I mean politicians, who sat in government for many years are casual about honesty, decency, truth and the rule of law, calling for inquiries because they want to jump on a bandwagon of the far-right, then that affects politics because a robust debate can only be based on the true facts." He continued: "My fight to change the way that the prosecution service operated is a matter of public record. Making sure the men responsible for these despicable acts were brought to justice. Put in the dock... then behind bars. That is why I brought the first prosecution for a grooming gang. Far-right voices have tried to rewrite history. Those spreading lies and misinformation are not interested in the victims. Those cheerleading for Tommy Robinson - a thug who was jailed for almost collapsing a grooming case - are not interested in justice. They are only interested in themselves." Starmer was head of the CPS in 2009 when a decision was made not to prosecute an individual who was part of the Rochdale child sex abuse ring; however, there is no evidence Starmer was personally involved in the decision. BBC Verify stated there was no evidence Starmer was involved in decisions not to prosecute in Oldham. Then Home Secretary Yvette Cooper announced a government-backed Oldham inquiry and a nationwide review of evidence on 16 January 2025.

Amid the scandal surrounding Peter Mandelson's relationship with sex offender Jeffrey Epstein, Starmer has faced significant political pressure regarding the scandal, particularly concerning his initial appointment and later sacking of Mandelson as UK ambassador to the US. Starmer's response has included publicly expressing anger, stating that he would not have made the appointment had he known the full extent of Mandelson's ties to Epstein, and acknowledging flaws in the vetting process. On Wednesday, September 10, 2025, during Prime Minister's Questions, Starmer publicly defended Mandelson, stating "Let me start by saying that the victims of Epstein are at the forefront of our minds. He was a despicable criminal who committed the most heinous crimes and destroyed the lives of so many women and girls. The ambassador has repeatedly expressed his deep regret for his association with Epstein, and he is right to do so. I have confidence in him, and he is playing an important role in the UK-US relationship." Starmer sacked Mandelson the next day, September 11, after emails emerged showing Mandelson encouraged Epstein to "fight for early release" from jail in 2008. Starmer described Mandelson's comments as "reprehensible" and said they contradicted his government's stance on violence against women and girls. A source close to Starmer revealed that the prime minister is "frustrated and a bit angry" at the scandal, because he is having to deal with the conduct of others, rather than show what he is trying to do." In his first interview since Mandelson was dismissed, Starmer said: “I don’t particularly think anger helps here, but I feel let down. I feel that the process was gone through and now information has come to light which had I known it at the time, I wouldn’t have appointed him.”

In a February 2026 statement at Prime Minister's Questions following subsequent revelations about Mandelson in the Epstein files, Starmer addressed the fallout from revealed links between Mandelson and Epstein, focusing on accountability and the protection of public standards. He began by expressing solidarity with Epstein's victims and those affected by the 2008 financial crash, acknowledging their trauma and anger. Starmer accused Mandelson of repeatedly lying to his team during the vetting process for his appointment as US ambassador, specifically misrepresenting the nature of his relationship with Epstein. He characterised Mandelson's alleged actions—including leaking sensitive information during the 2008 financial crisis—as a betrayal of the country, Parliament, and the Labour Party. Regarding legal consequences, Starmer confirmed that material had been referred to the police, resulting in an active criminal investigation into potential misconduct. He also announced plans to draft legislation to strip Mandelson of his title and to establish broader powers for removing disgraced peers from the House of Lords. Finally, he stated he reached an agreement with King Charles III to remove Mandelson from the Privy Council for bringing the body into disrepute. Starmer explicitly expressed regret for the appointment, stating that Mandelson would never have been considered for the role had the full extent of his ties to Epstein been known at the time.

=== Other types of crime ===
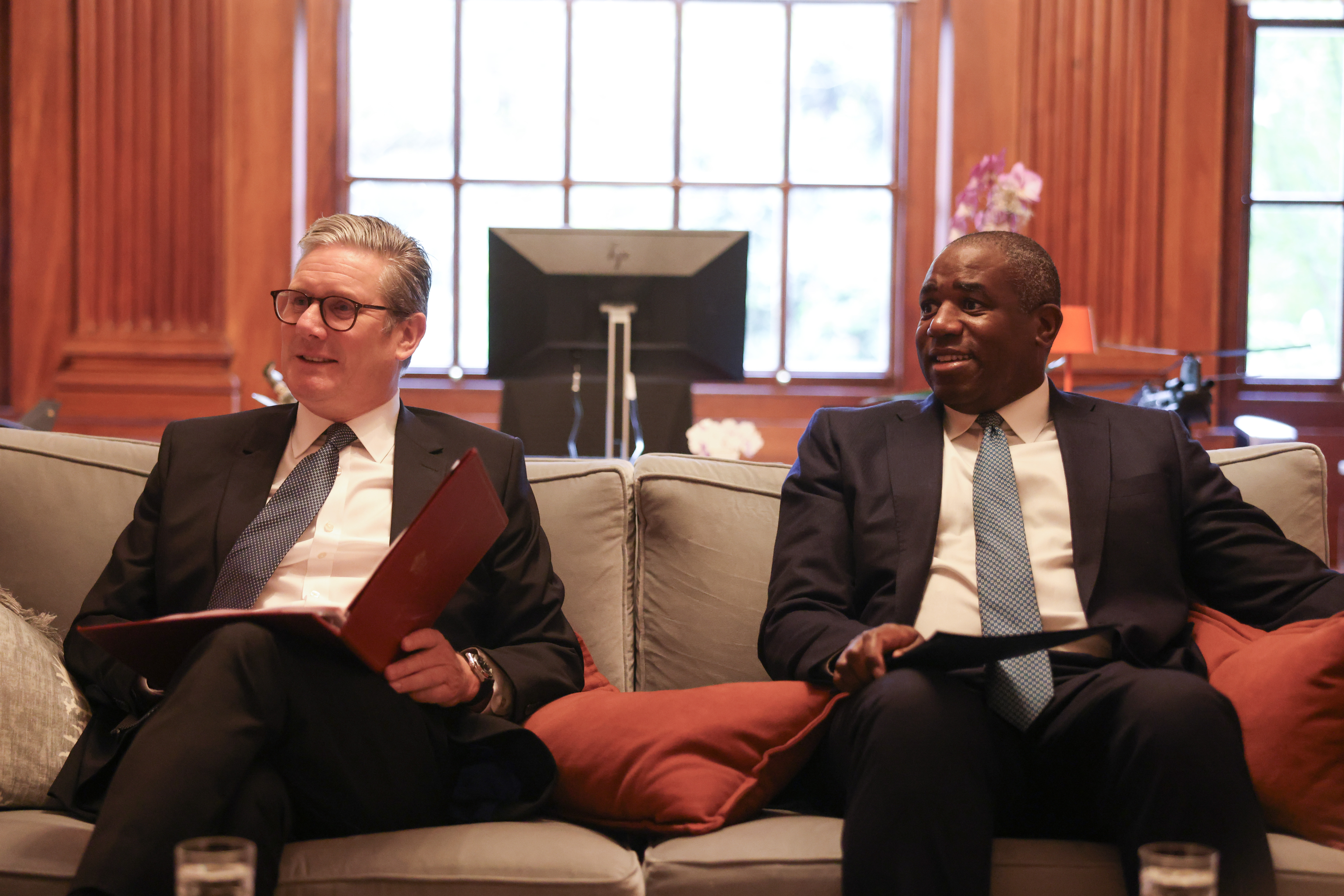
Starmer with then Foreign Secretary David Lammy

In August 2023, former neonatal nurse Lucy Letby was convicted of murders and attempted murders of babies between 2015 and 2016, and opted not to attend the sentencing hearing and as such heard neither the various victim impact statements which were read out, nor her sentence being passed. In response, Starmer called for the need for a statutory inquiry. It was later announced by Sunak's government that the inquiry had been upgraded to a statutory inquiry, describing it as the best way forward and meaning that witnesses would be compelled to give evidence. Starmer also supported Sunak's plan to introduce legislation to Parliament that would compel convicted criminals to attend their sentencing hearings, by force if necessary, or face the prospect of more time in prison. This would ultimately occur during Starmer's premiership, after a new clause to the criminal justice bill was introduced in a 2024 parliamentary debate.

Shortly after taking office, Starmer said that there were "too many prisoners", and described the previous government as having acted with "almost beyond recklessness". In order to manage the prison overcrowding, his Justice Secretary, Shabana Mahmood, announced the implementation of an early release scheme which allowed for prisoners in England and Wales to be released after serving 40 per cent of their sentences rather than the 50 per cent previously introduced under the last government. Over 1,700 prisoners were released in September, with further releases expected in the following year. One prisoner released early under the scheme was charged with sexual assault relating to an alleged offence against a woman on the same day he was freed. Starmer has defended the releasing of prisoners, and accused the previous government of having "broke the prison system."

=== Comments on Rishi Sunak ===
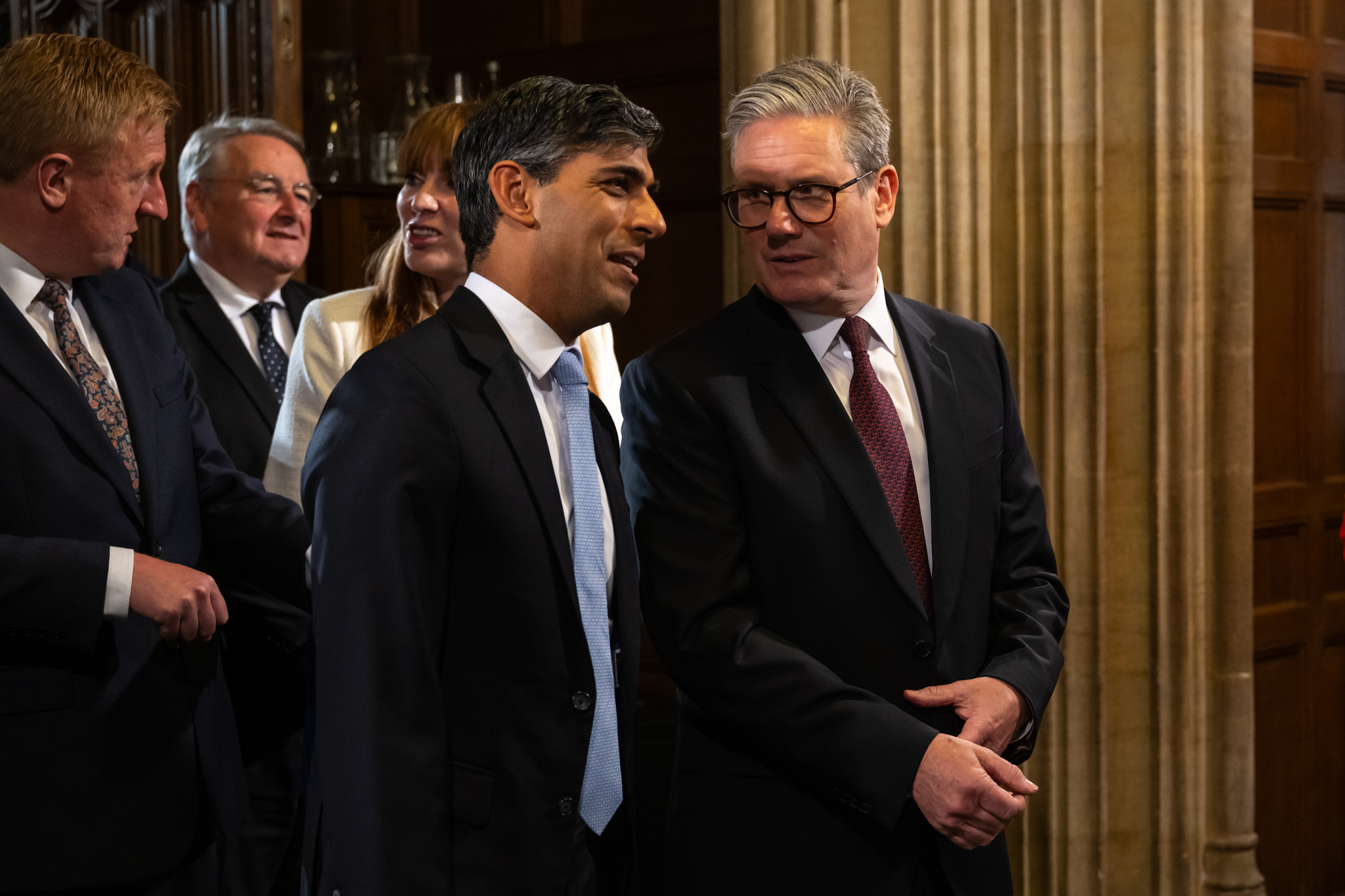
Starmer and Rishi Sunak at the 2024 State Opening of Parliament

A month before the 2023 local elections, several attack ads were produced by Labour targeting Rishi Sunak and the Conservative Party's record in government as a whole, focusing on issues such as crime, the economy, and health and social care. One of these ads featured the controversial claim that Sunak did not want child sex abusers to be jailed, which referred to the Conservatives' record on prosecuting child sex abusers. The figures covered the period starting in 2010 - five years before Sunak became an MP and 11 years before he became prime minister - and ending in 2022. Other attack ads accused Sunak of being soft on gun crime and suggesting thieves should not be punished, and another referred to Sunak's wife Akshata Murty and her previously held non-dom tax status.

Labour's decision to target Sunak personally caused upset amongst current and former MPs from a wide range of parties. Starmer responded by backing the message "no matter how squeamish it might make some feel" by saying: "I make no apologies for highlighting the failures of this government. This argument that because they've changed the prime minister five times that somehow the PM doesn't bear responsibility for 13 years of grief for many people I just don't think stacks up."

=== Comments on Margaret Thatcher ===
In a Sunday Telegraph article he wrote in December 2023, Starmer praised former Conservative prime minister Margaret Thatcher for having "sought to drag Britain out of its stupor", saying Thatcher had "set loose our natural entrepreneurialism" during her time as prime minister, and cited Thatcher, as well as Labour prime ministers Tony Blair and Clement Attlee as examples of how politicians can effect "meaningful change" by acting "in service of the British people, rather than dictating to them". Starmer defended his remarks on Thatcher by saying: "What I was doing was distinguishing between particularly post-war leaders – those leaders, those prime ministers – who had a driving sense of purpose, ambition, a plan to deliver and those that drifted. ... So I was giving Margaret Thatcher as an example of the sort of leader who had that mission and plan. That's obviously different to saying I agree with everything that she did."

=== Comments on the Labour Party ===
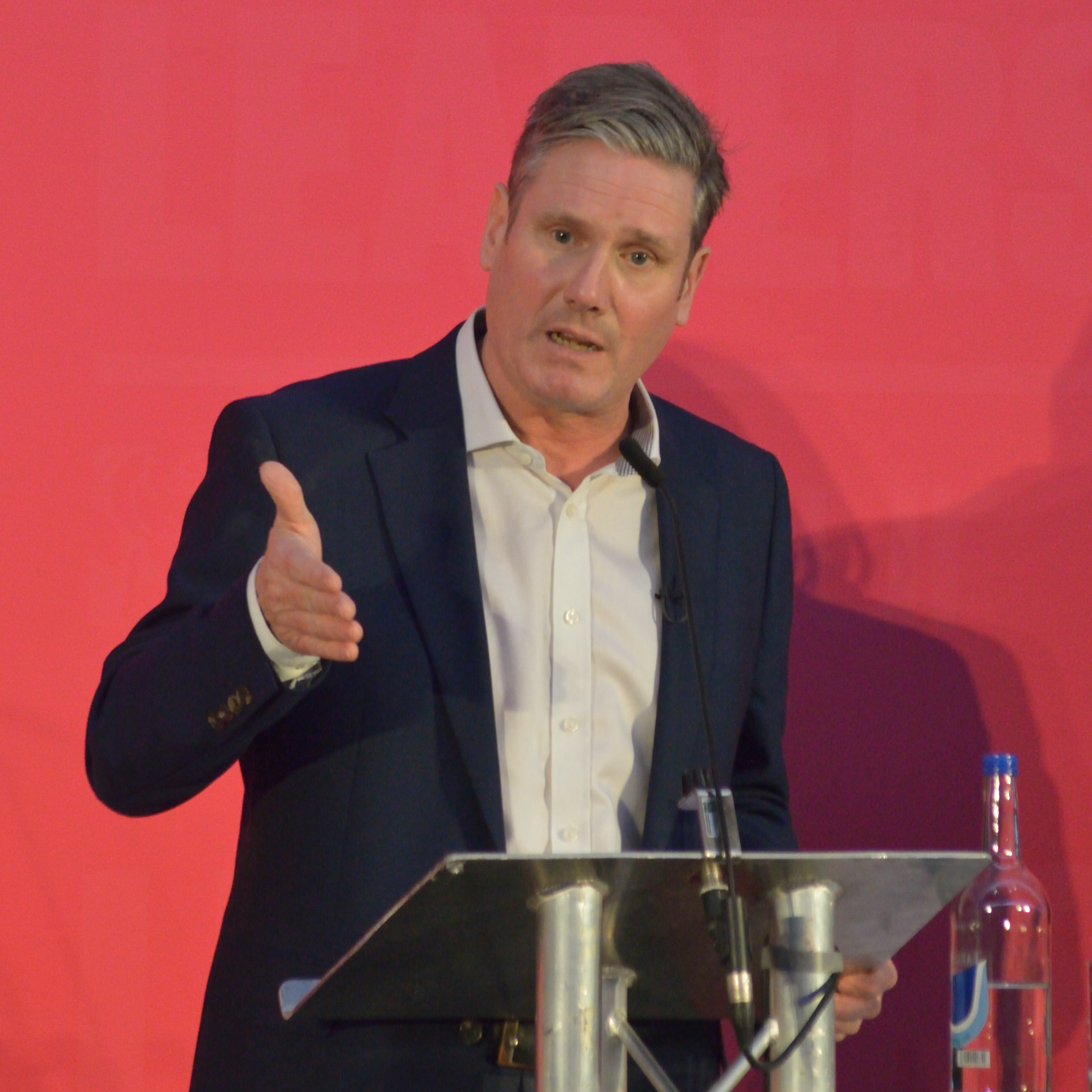
Starmer speaking at the 2020 Labour Party leadership election hustings in Bristol

Starmer has described the Labour Party as "deeply patriotic" and credits its most successful leaders and prime ministers, Clement Attlee, Harold Wilson, and Tony Blair, for policies "rooted in the everyday concerns of working people". Before becoming prime minister, Starmer advocated a government based on "security, prosperity and respect". In a speech on 13 May 2023, Starmer stated:

Don't mistake me, the very best of progressive politics is found in our determination to push Britain forward. A hunger, an ambition, that we can seize the opportunities of tomorrow and make them work for working people. But this ambition must never become unmoored from working people's need for stability, for order, security. The Conservative Party can no longer claim to be conservative. It conserves nothing we value — not our rivers and seas, not our NHS or BBC, not our families, not our nation. We must understand there are precious things – in our way of life, in our environment, in our communities – that it is our responsibility to protect and preserve and to pass on to future generations. If that sounds conservative, then let me tell you: I don't care.

— Keir Starmer

==== Antisemitism reforms and views ====
Following past accusations of antisemitism in the party during Corbyn's leadership, Starmer pledged to end antisemitism in the party during his acceptance speech, saying "Anti-semitism has been a stain on our party. I have seen the grief that it's brought to so many Jewish communities. On behalf of the Labour Party, I am sorry. And I will tear out this poison by its roots and judge success by the return of Jewish members and those who felt that they could no longer support us." In October 2020, following the release of the Equality and Human Rights Commission (EHRC)'s report into antisemitism in the party, Starmer accepted its findings in full and apologised to Jews on behalf of the party. Later that day, Corbyn stated that "the scale of the problem was also dramatically overstated for political reasons". He was later suspended over his response to the report. In February 2023, Starmer's antisemitism reforms resulted in the party no longer being monitored by the EHRC. After having previously resigned from the party in February 2019 citing the handling of antisemitism allegations in the party, former Labour MP Luciana Berger rejoined in February 2023. Berger accepted an apology from Starmer, adding that the party had "turned a significant corner".

==== Comments on Roger Waters ====
On 7 June 2023, Starmer called for Pink Floyd co-founder Roger Waters' gigs in the UK to be axed amid accusations of antisemitism which Waters dismissed as a conflation with anti-Zionism, saying: "The Labour Party stands with the Jewish community and fully condemns Roger Waters. Many people will think of Roger Waters as famous for being a member of one of the most important bands in history, but he is now more synonymous with spreading deeply troubling antisemitism and that is why I believe this show should not be allowed to go ahead." In response, Waters said: "The depiction of an unhinged fascist demagogue has been a feature of my shows since Pink Floyd's The Wall in 1980. I have spent my entire life speaking out against authoritarianism and oppression wherever I see it."

==== Comments on Kanye West ====
In April 2026, Starmer formally condemned the decision of London's Wireless Festival to book rapper Kanye West as a headliner, citing West's history of Nazi rants and antisemitic remarks as "incompatible with British values." He has described West's antisemitic remarks as "abhorrent" and "a poison that must be confronted firmly", aligning with his broader views against antisemitism. Starmer also argued that allowing West to perform would undermine efforts to ensure the Jewish community feels safe and secure in Britain. Furthermore, he publicly stated that West should never have been invited to headline the festival, labeling the organizers' decision as deeply irresponsible.

Following a formal review by the Home Office, West was barred from entering the country in April 2026 after officials determined his presence would not be conducive to the public good. This government intervention eventually led to the cancellation of the entire Wireless Festival after major sponsors withdrew their support. In response, West said: "My only goal is to come to London and present a show of change, bringing unity, peace, and love through my music. I would be grateful for the opportunity to meet with members of the Jewish community in the UK in person, to listen. I know words aren't enough – I'll have to show change through my actions. If you're open, I'm here".

=== Assisted dying ===
Starmer is a longtime supporter of the campaign for assisted dying or doctor-assisted voluntary euthanasia in the UK. As Director of Public Prosecutions in 2014, he published guidance on when not to prosecute cases where compassion was the sole motivator in assisting a relative to access assisted dying overseas, following the Supreme Court Martin case. In 2015, he intervened and voted in support of Rob Marris's Private Member's Bill on assisted dying.

On 13 March 2024, Starmer pledged to give MPs a vote on assisted suicide if Labour won the 2024 general election, which they did. He phoned pro-assisted suicide campaigner Esther Rantzen and said to her: "I'm personally in favour of changing the law. I think we need to make time. We will make the commitment. Esther, I can give you that commitment right now... For people who are going through this or are likely to go through it in the next few months or years, this matters hugely and delay just prolongs the agony."

In September 2024, Kim Leadbeater, Labour MP for Spen Valley, was drawn first in the ballot for private members' bills. She announced on 3 October 2024 that she would introduce a bill on assisted dying, and on 16 October 2024, the Terminally Ill Adults (End of Life) Bill was introduced to the House of Commons. The full text of the bill (as presented for second reading) was published on 11 November 2024. Starmer acknowledged the vote for Leadbeater's bill as being "very important". Additionally, Starmer noted parliament's future intentions to strengthen NHS care for all needs, "including end-of-life care."

=== Religion ===
Starmer is an atheist, and has chosen to take a "solemn affirmation" (rather than an oath) of allegiance to the monarch. He has said that although he does not believe in God, he recognises the power of faith to bring people together. He also accompanies his family to services at the Liberal Jewish Synagogue in north London.

After the death of Pope Francis on 21 April 2025, Starmer praised him as "a Pope for the poor, the downtrodden and the forgotten" and attended his funeral alongside his wife Victoria.

=== Other ===
Starmer is a keen footballer, having played for Homerton Academicals, a north London amateur team. He supports the Premier League football club Arsenal.

Starmer opposes the death penalty. He opposes a proposed second Scottish independence referendum.

In 2005, Starmer had stated: "I got made a Queen's Counsel, which is odd since I often used to propose the abolition of the monarchy." Starmer has become more supportive of the monarchy since entering politics in 2015, paying tribute to Queen Elizabeth II following the monarch's death in 2022 by stating: "The Late Queen Elizabeth II was this great country's greatest monarch. She created a special, personal relationship with all of us. A relationship based on service and devotion to our country. Even now, after the mourning period has passed it still feels impossible to imagine a Britain without her. Hardly any of us have ever known anything else. For us, the Late Queen has always been simply the Queen, the only Queen. Above all else, our Queen."

Starmer made a statement about the Grenfell Tower Inquiry's final report on 4 September 2024, stating the bereaved relatives and survivors of the Grenfell Tower fire in 2017 had "been let down so badly" and there must be "full accountability" for the "decades of failure by central government."

On numerous occasions, Starmer has criticized the manosphere ideology of Andrew Tate, including pledging 88 million pounds to counter toxic masculinity, deprecating Farage's concurrence with Tate, as well as a strategy designed to counter Tate's philosophy via compulsory lessons on relationships and consent.

== Foreign affairs ==
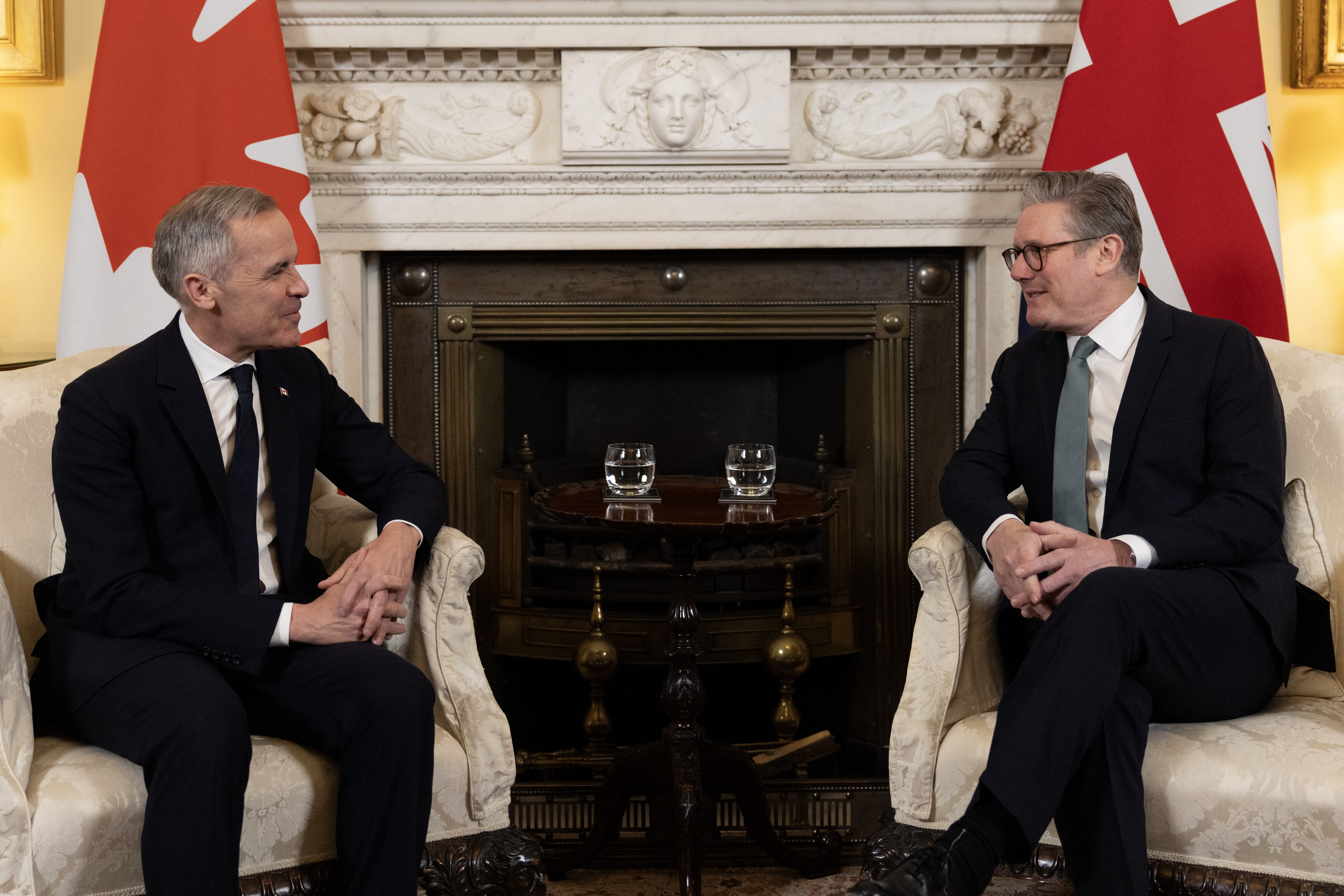
Starmer meets with Canadian prime minister Mark Carney on March 17, 2025

Starmer's foreign policy approach is characterised by support for multilateral institutions, international law, and parliamentary oversight of military action. He has consistently argued that the Iraq War was "not lawful under international law because there was no UN resolution expressly authorising it". During his 2020 leadership campaign, Starmer pledged to create a Prevention of Military Intervention Act, which would only permit lawful military action with the support of the House of Commons. He has advocated for an end to "illegal wars" and a review of UK arms exports.

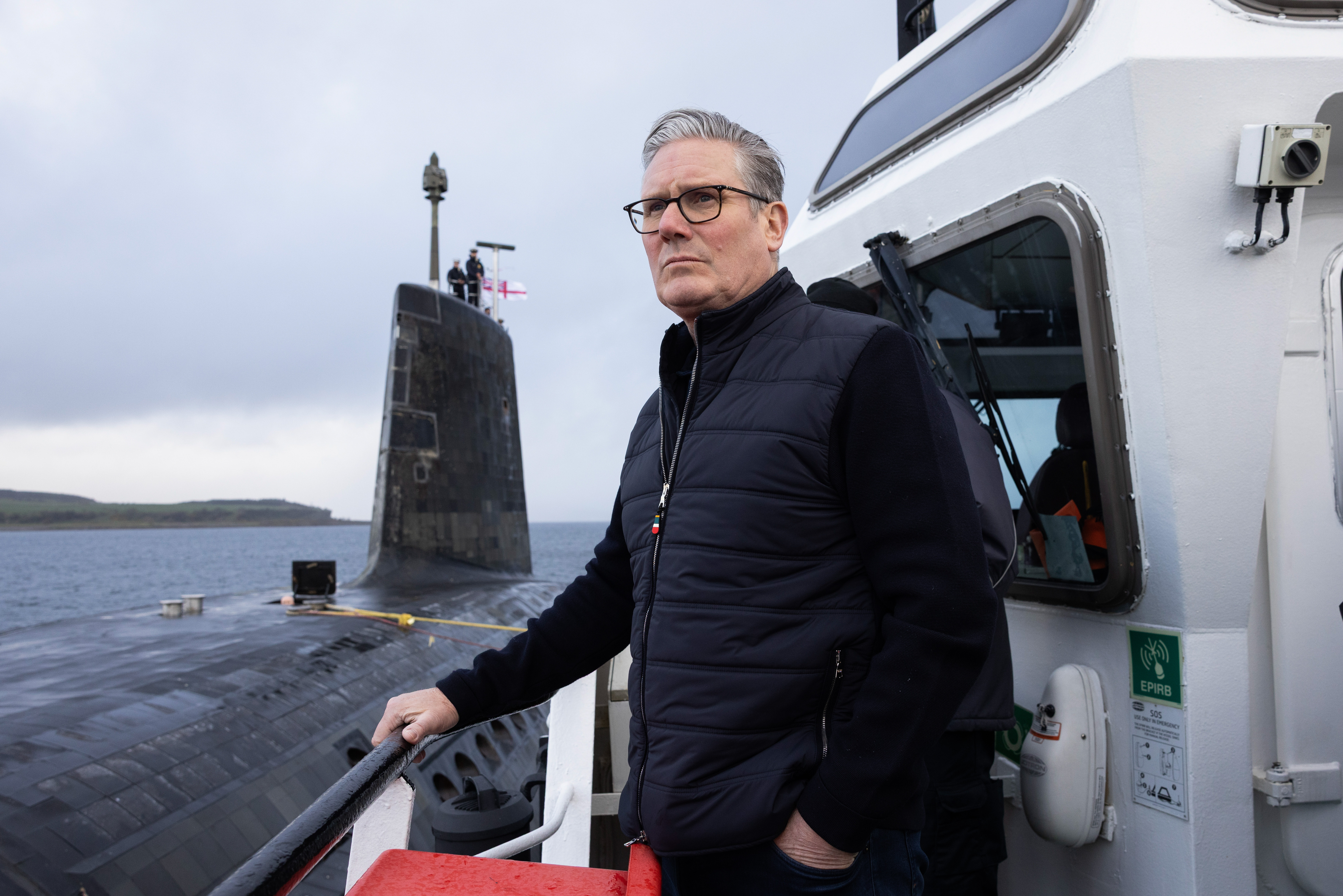
Starmer visiting a Vanguard-class submarine which provide Britain's nuclear deterrent

Starmer supports maintaining the UK's nuclear arsenal as a nuclear deterrent, and voted for renewal of the Trident programme. He has made comments suggesting he supported the general post-Cold War British policy of gradual reduction in nuclear stockpiles, however in 2025 he announced the purchase of F-35A aircraft capable of deploying US nuclear weapons in NATO's dual capable aircraft nuclear mission which would be "the biggest strengthening of the UK's nuclear posture in a generation".

In 2014, Starmer argued that the three-month siege of Vukovar by Serbian forces during the Croatian War of Independence in 1991 constituted genocide. In 2021, he opposed the withdrawal of NATO troops from Afghanistan, stating: "There is a real risk that international terrorism will take hold again in Afghanistan, so we can't walk away and undermine the legacy of the last 20 years." Starmer's office confirmed that the UK provided support for U.S. strikes in Yemen in March 2025 through "routine allied air-to-air refuelling".

=== Multilateral relations ===
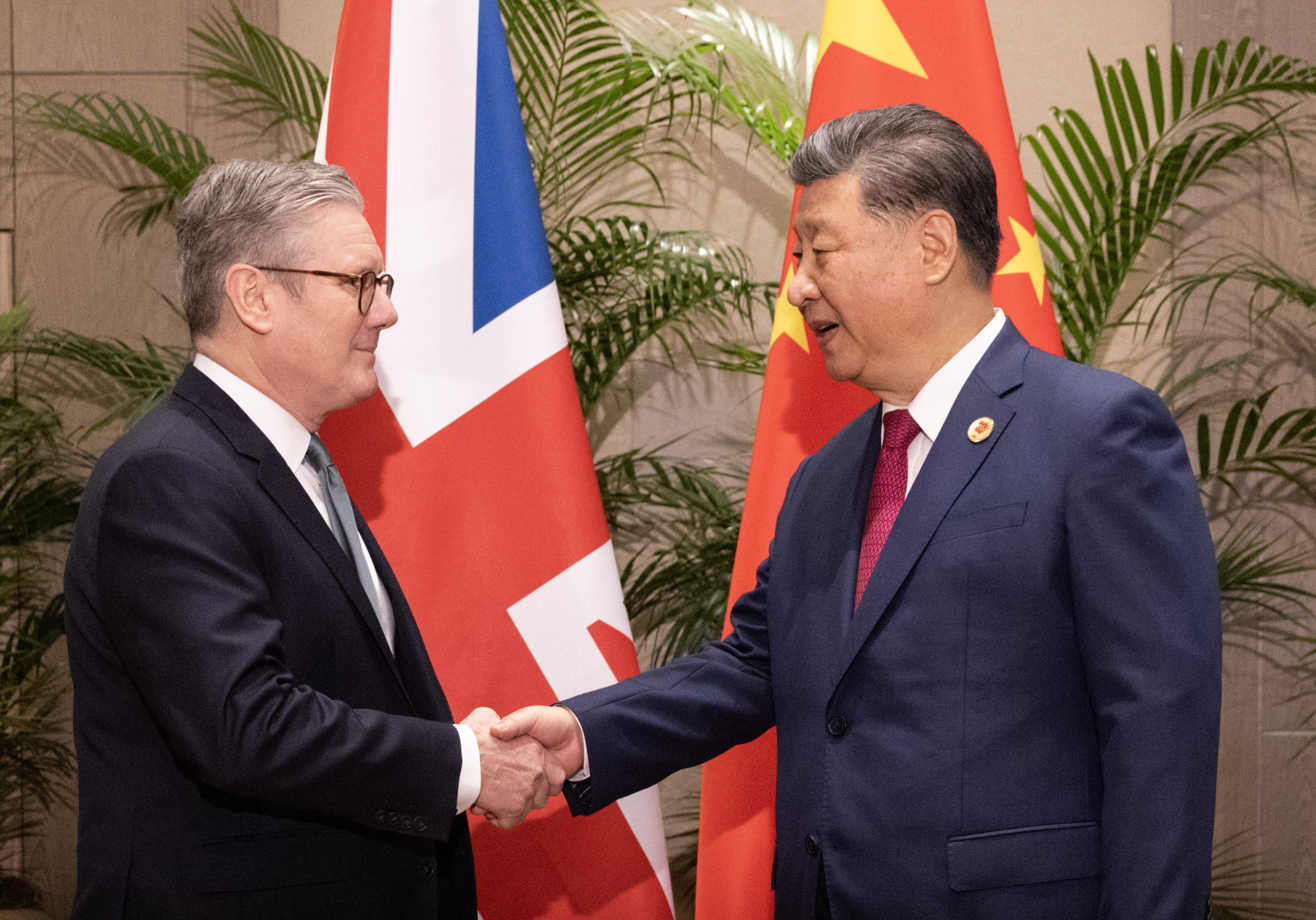
Starmer with Chinese president Xi Jinping on 18 November 2024

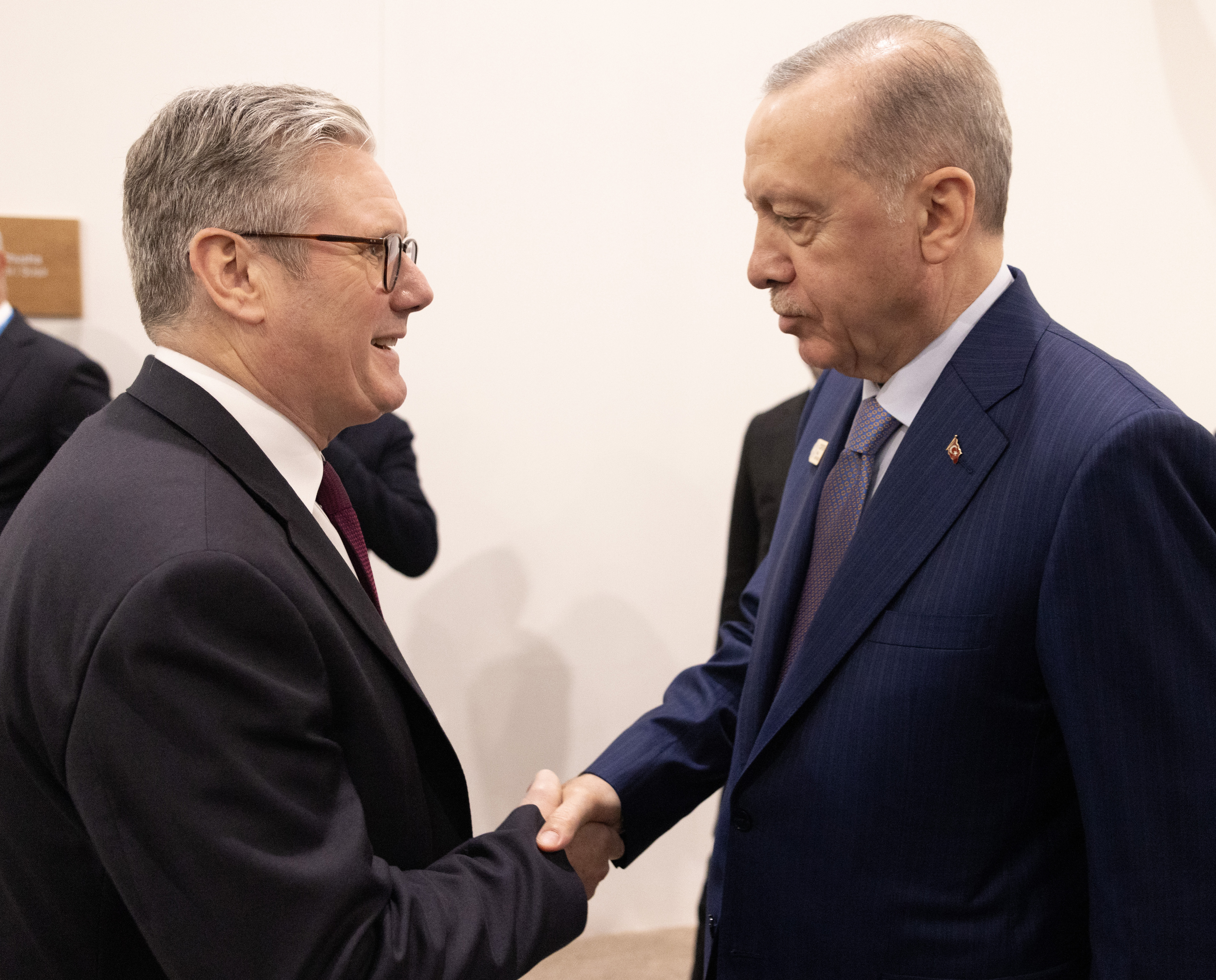
Starmer with Turkish president Recep Tayyip Erdoğan at the COP29 in Azerbaijan, 12 November 2024

Starmer has called for sanctions against Chinese officials involved in human rights abuses. In July 2024, he pledged to take a tougher approach to China on human rights and security issues, including China's support for Russia during the Russian invasion of Ukraine. However, in November 2024, Starmer met Chinese leader Xi Jinping at the G20 summit in Rio de Janeiro and expressed a desire to build a "consistent, durable, respectful" relationship with China.

Starmer has criticised UK arms sales to Saudi Arabia used in the Saudi military campaign in Yemen, which contributed to the humanitarian crisis in that country.

=== European Union and Brexit ===
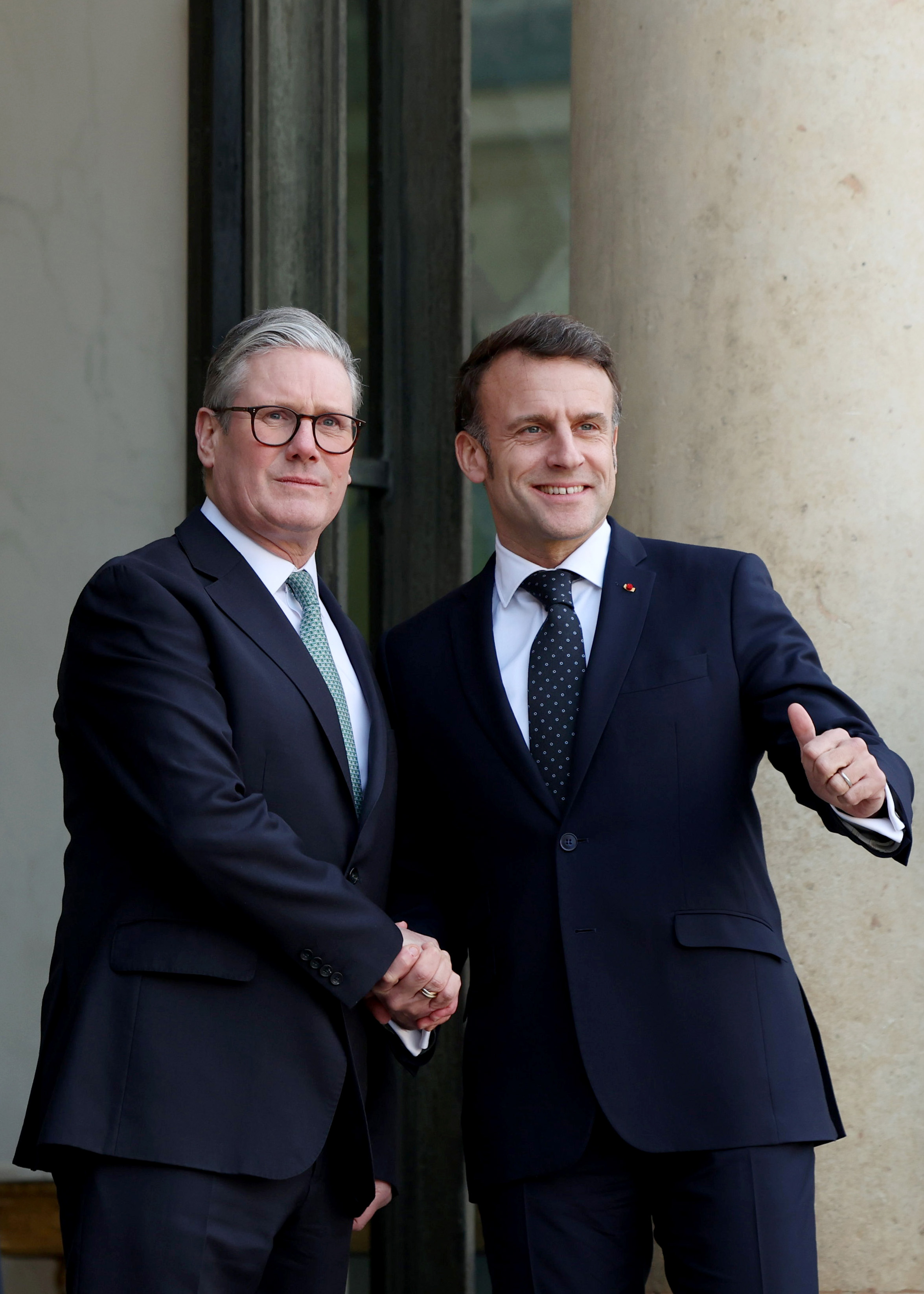
Starmer with French president Emmanuel Macron, February 2025

Starmer supported the unsuccessful Britain Stronger in Europe campaign in the 2016 European Union membership referendum and, as Shadow Secretary of State for Exiting the European Union, advocated for a second Brexit referendum after the UK withdrawal from the EU. In 2021, he ruled out a return to free movement with the EU or substantial renegotiation of the EU–UK Trade and Cooperation Agreement. In 2023, Starmer wrote in the Daily Express that "Britain's future is outside the EU" and stated he would not take the UK back into the EU, the single market, customs union, or return to freedom of movement.

Despite ruling out EU membership, Starmer has called for much closer economic, diplomatic and military collaboration between the UK and EU. He has indicated he would seek to revisit the Brexit deal negotiated and implemented by Boris Johnson. Whilst in opposition, Starmer indicated he would use the 4th European Political Community Summit to establish a "new geopolitical partnership", with aims including improving the Trade and Cooperation Agreement (TCA) by renegotiating free trade agreement terms and rejoining the Erasmus student exchange programme. David Lammy has stated he wants the UK and the EU to create a security pact and for the UK to attend meetings of the EU's Foreign Affairs Council.

As prime minister, Starmer has visited Germany and France to reset post-Brexit relations with the EU. He discussed a proposed UK-Germany treaty on defence and energy and met with French president Macron on 29 August 2024 to enhance cooperation on tackling illegal migration. Starmer's government aims to strengthen the UK's relationship with the EU in areas such as defence, trade and security whilst maintaining that Brexit is final and ruling out rejoining the EU or negotiating a customs union. Starmer's aides have downplayed the chances of using future summits to renegotiate the TCA, including veterinary agreements and mobility deals.

=== United States ===
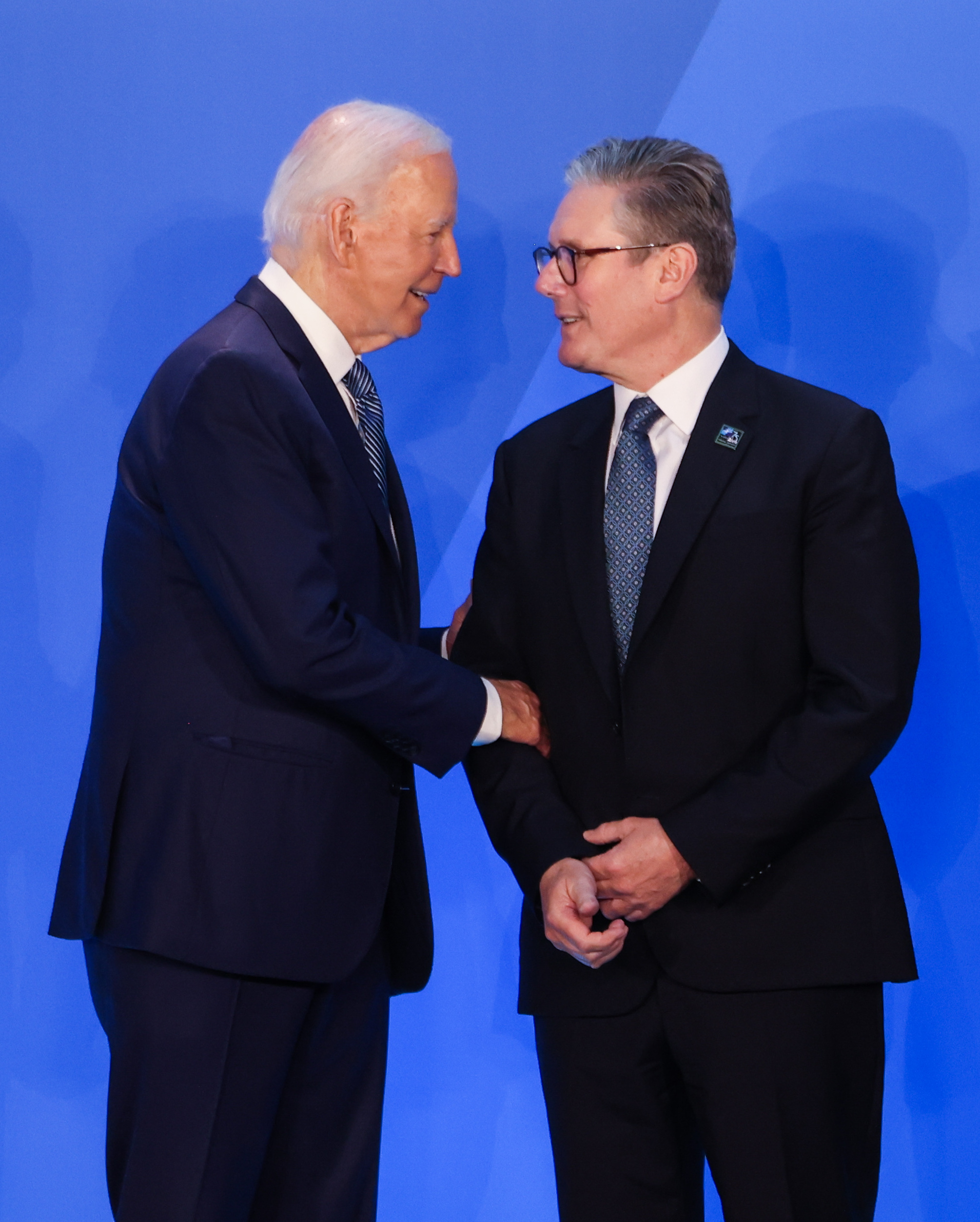
US president Joe Biden with Starmer on 10 July 2024 during the 2024 Washington summit

Following the murder of George Floyd at the hands of police officer Derek Chauvin in the United States and the subsequent protests, Starmer expressed support for the Black Lives Matter movement and took the knee alongside his deputy, Angela Rayner. He also called the George Floyd protests "a moment", though later regretted saying this after being criticised for dismissing the campaign's importance. Starmer said of George Floyd: "He must not become just another name. His death must be a catalyst for change." One year on from Floyd's murder, Starmer promised a race equality act, which he said would be a "defining cause" for his Labour government.

Starmer stated amid the 2016 US presidential election that he would not want to have Republican Party presidential candidate Donald Trump "round for dinner". When Trump backed Boris Johnson for the Conservative leadership in 2019 after the resignation of Theresa May, Starmer said "an endorsement from Donald Trump tells you everything you need to know about what is wrong with Boris Johnson's politics and why he isn't fit to be Prime Minister."

Starmer condemned the first Trump administration's assassination of General Qasem Soleimani; Starmer said the world needed to "engage, not isolate" Iran and called upon "all sides ... to de-escalate tensions and prevent further conflict."

During the US's transition from the first presidency of Trump to that of Joe Biden's one-term presidency in January 2021, Starmer said: "I'm anti-Trump but I'm pro-American. And I'm incredibly optimistic about the new relationship we can build with President Biden." He argued that "Britain is at its strongest" when it is "the bridge between the US and the rest of Europe."

In July 2024, following the UK general election, Starmer and Biden discussed their shared commitment to the Special Relationship and mutual support of Ukraine. Biden also congratulated Starmer on "a hell of a victory". Starmer presented Biden with an Arsenal shirt during their introductory meeting at the White House (which took place amid the 2024 Summer Olympics), while emphasising the importance of the US-UK Special Relationship.

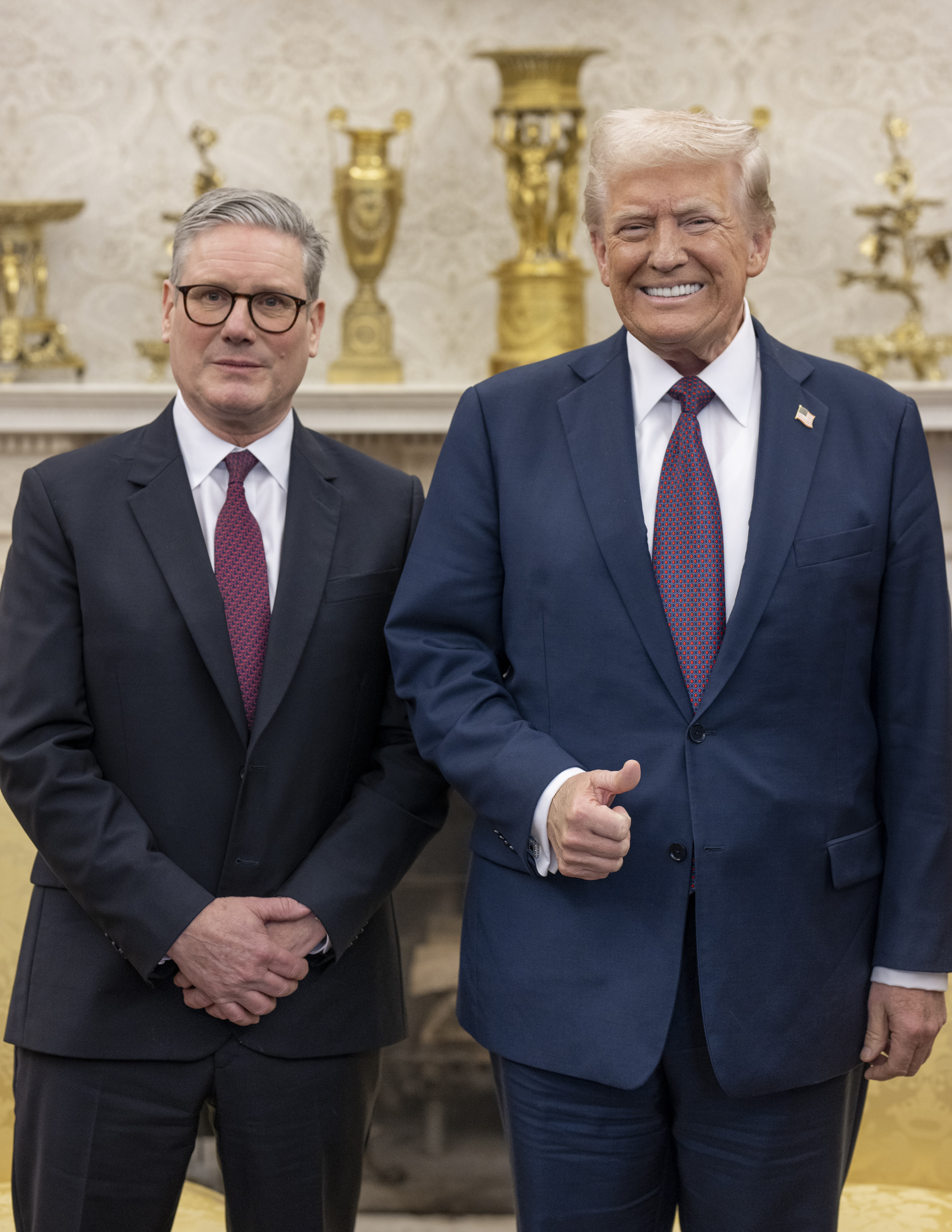
Starmer with US president Donald Trump at the White House, February 2025

Following the attempted assassination of Trump in Pennsylvania, the former president of the United States at the time, on 13 July 2024, Starmer responded by saying "Political violence in any form has no place in our societies" and extended his best wishes to Trump and his family.

In September 2024, during a visit to New York City to address the UN General Assembly, Starmer met Republican Party presidential candidate Donald Trump at Trump Tower. Following the meeting, Starmer said it was "good" to have met with Trump and that the meeting was an opportunity for both Trump and Starmer to establish a working relationship. Following Trump's election victory in the 2024 United States presidential election, Starmer called Trump to formally congratulate him on 6 November and was assured that the "special relationship" between the United Kingdom and United States "would continue to thrive".

In a statement on 19 January 2025, the day before the second inauguration of Donald Trump, Starmer sent congratulations to President Trump on behalf of the government and the United Kingdom. Starmer acknowledged Trump's historical ties and affection for the U.K., saying that "The United Kingdom and United States will work together to ensure the success of both our countries and deliver for people on both sides of the Atlantic."

In February 2025 Starmer met with President Trump at the White House to discuss continued support to Ukraine and a potential peace deal. They additionally discussed a potential trade deal. He also presented a handwritten letter from King Charles III inviting the president to a historic second state visit to the UK. In April 2025, Trump announced tariffs on foreign imports into the United States, with British products affected by a 10% tariff. Starmer stated he planned to negotiate a trade deal with the United States and that he did not want the UK to enter a trade war.

During the 2026 United States strikes in Venezuela, Starmer refused to condemn the attacks as a violation of international law and said that he "shed no tears" over President Maduro's kidnapping.

=== Russia and Ukraine ===
Starmer has supported Ukraine during the Russian invasion, both as opposition leader and as prime minister. During the prelude to the Russian invasion of Ukraine, Starmer met with Secretary General of NATO Jens Stoltenberg and stated in a BBC interview that Corbyn was "wrong" to criticise NATO and that the Labour Party's commitment to NATO was "unshakeable". He added: "We stand united in the UK ... Whatever challenges we have with the [Conservative] government, when it comes to Russian aggression we stand together."

Starmer called for "widespread and hard-hitting" economic sanctions against Russia. He also criticised the Stop the War Coalition in an op-ed for The Guardian, writing that the group's members were "not benign voices for peace" but "[a]t best they are naive, at worst they actively give succour to authoritarian leaders" such as Russian president Vladimir Putin "who directly threaten democracies".

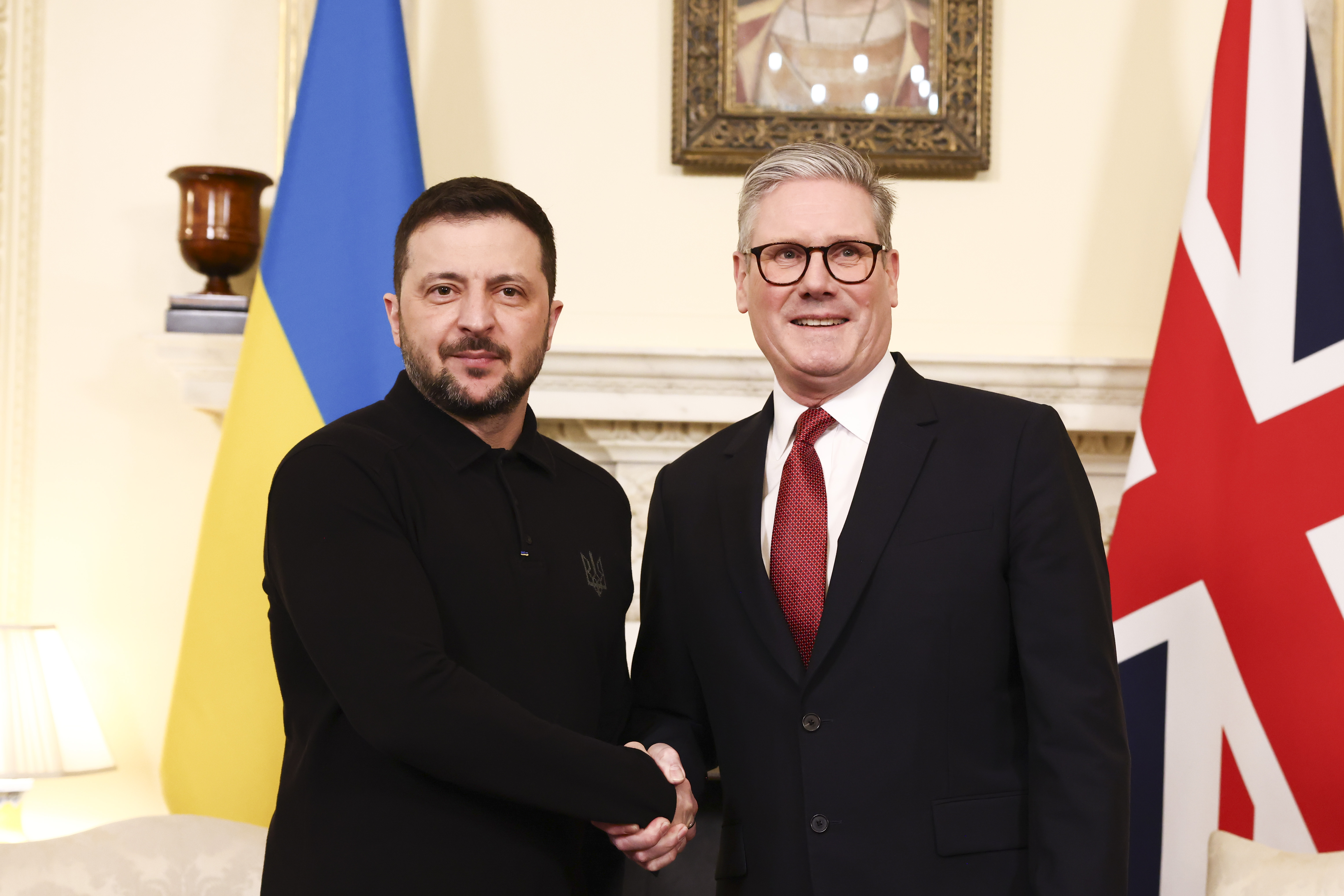
Starmer with Ukraine President Volodymyr Zelenskyy, February 2025

In February 2023, Starmer met Ukrainian president Volodymyr Zelenskyy and pledged support for Ukraine during the Russian invasion of the country. Starmer stated there would be no change in Britain's position on the war in Ukraine under his leadership.

He also called for Russian leaders, including Putin, to be tried at The Hague for crimes against humanity. Starmer supported the International Criminal Court's issuance of an arrest warrant for Putin after he was indicted in the ICC.

At the 2024 NATO summit, Starmer signaled that Ukraine could use Britain's Storm Shadow missile donations to strike military targets inside Russia. In a meeting with Zelenskyy, Starmer called for an "irreversible" membership strategy for Ukraine to join NATO. In October 2024, Starmer described the UK's support to Ukraine as "ironclad". In February 2025, following attacks on Ukraine's leadership by Trump, Starmer said that Zelenskyy is Ukraine's "democratically elected leader" and it is "perfectly reasonable" for Ukraine to "suspend elections during wartime as the UK did during World War Two".

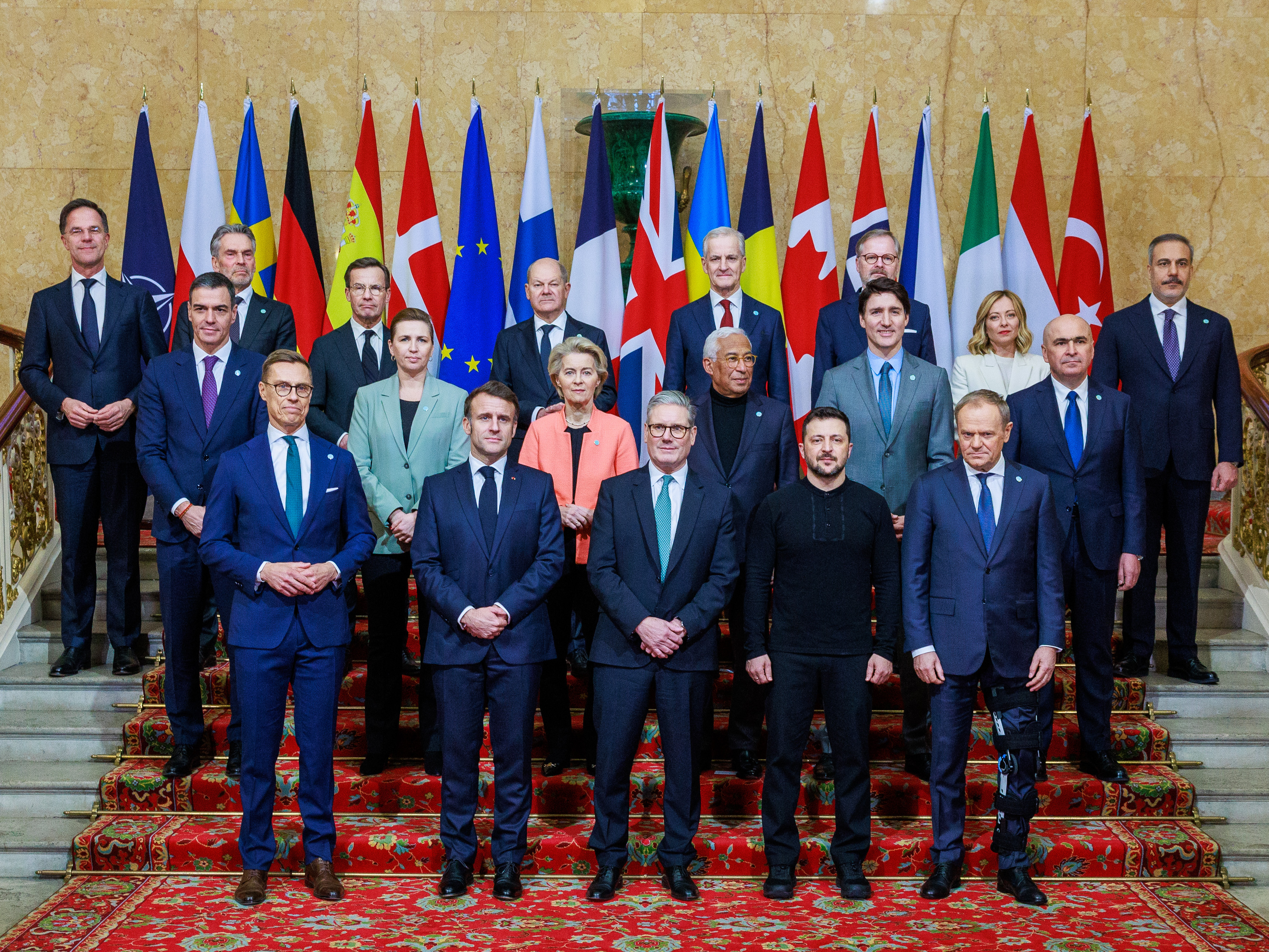
Starmer with international leaders at the 2025 London Summit on Ukraine

On 16 February 2025, Starmer said he is ready to deploy British peacekeeping units in Ukraine if there is a peace deal to end the Russian invasion of Ukraine.

Following a heated meeting between Trump, Zelenskyy and JD Vance at the White House, Starmer hosted the 2025 London Summit on Ukraine with 18 world leaders. At the summit, he announced the creation of a Coalition of the willing to support peace in Ukraine and end the Russian invasion.

The stated aim of the initiative is to facilitate the peace negotiation attempts launched and mediated by the United States between Ukraine and Russia in February 2025. This would be achieved by helping to build strong enough security guarantees for Ukraine to ensure that any potential ceasefire or peace deal would be lasting.

Besides serving as a potential peacekeeping force, the coalition has also expressed readiness to increase military support for Ukraine and strengthen economic sanctions against Russia if the ongoing negotiations for a "comprehensive ceasefire" or "peace deal" fail. As of 20 March 2025, the exact shape and function of the coalition was described as still being subject to ongoing planning but had moved into an "operational phase".

=== Israel and Palestine ===
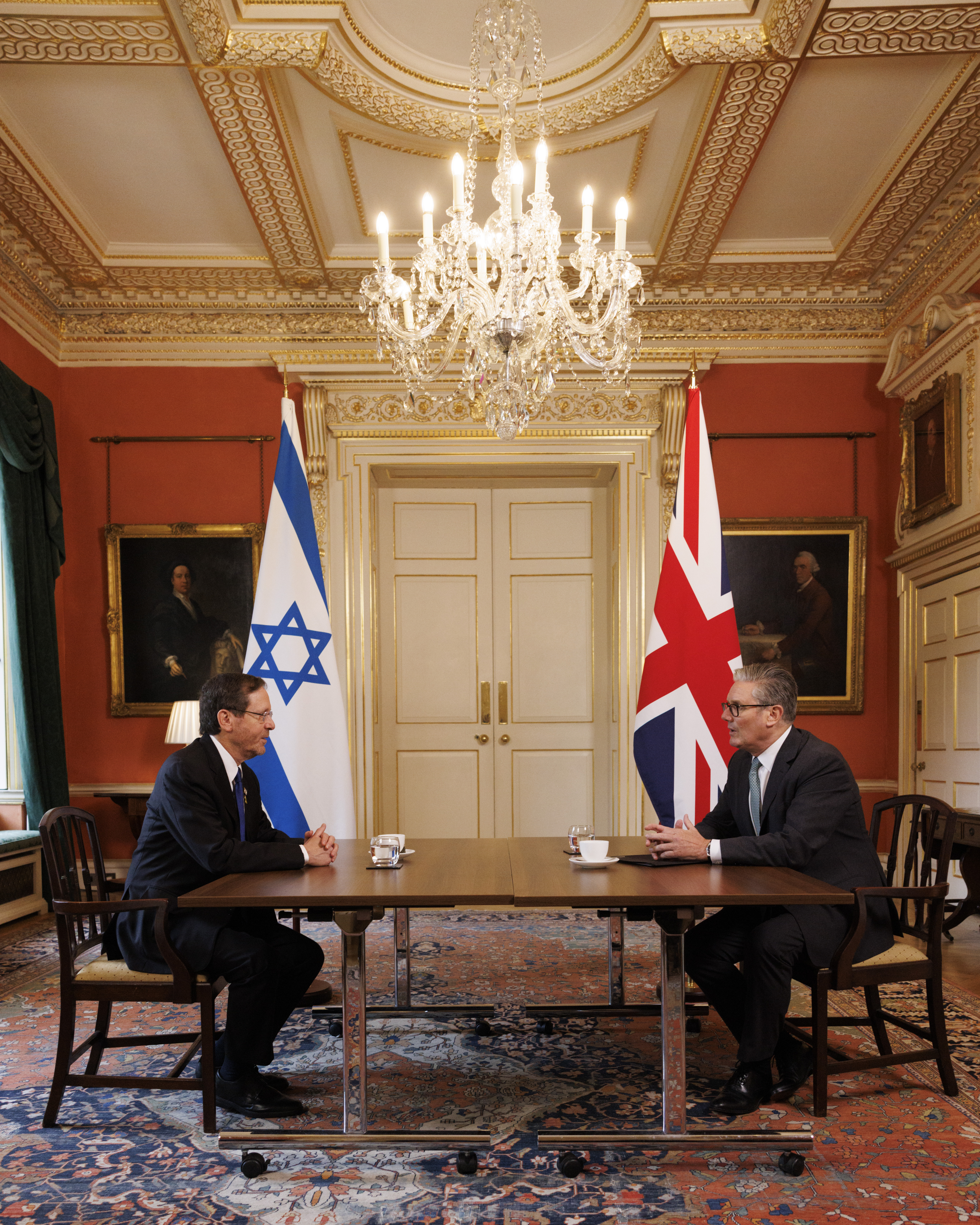
Starmer with Israeli president Isaac Herzog at 10 Downing Street, 10 September 2025

In 2021, Starmer said that Israel "must respect international law" and called on the Israeli government to work with Palestinian leaders to de-escalate the Israeli–Palestinian conflict. Starmer opposes Israeli settlements, proposals for Israeli annexation of the West Bank, and "the eviction of Palestinians" in the Israeli-occupied territories; he also opposes the Palestinian-led Boycott, Divestment and Sanctions (BDS) movement. Starmer also has expressed support for the creation of an "inverse OPEC" to promote renewable energy. He has rejected the contention that Israel is an apartheid state. During a June 2023 meeting with Palestinian Mission to the United Kingdom head Husam Zomlot, Starmer recommitted the Labour Party to the recognition of a Palestinian state. In January 2024, Starmer said that Labour would recognize a State of Palestine as part of a multi-national peace process, rather than extending recognition immediately or unilaterally; this confirmed a recommendations from the party's policy forum in October 2023.

In October 2023, Hamas launched a surprise attack on Israel that devolved into a war and a growing humanitarian crisis in the Gaza Strip. Starmer expressed support for Israel, condemned Hamas' actions as terrorism, and said, "This action by Hamas does nothing for Palestinians. And Israel must always have the right to defend her people." In an interview with LBC on 11 October 2023, Starmer was asked what would be a "proportionate" response to the Hamas attack. Starmer replied that Israel "has the right to defend herself". Presenter Nick Ferrari interjected: "A siege is appropriate? Cutting off power, cutting off water?" Starmer continued, "I think that Israel does have that right ... obviously everything should be done within international law". On 20 October, Starmer said that he was referring to Israel's right to defend itself, adding "I was not saying that Israel had the right to cut off water, food, fuel or medicines". Starmer had said that a ceasefire would only benefit Hamas for future attacks, instead calling for a humanitarian pause to allow aid to reach Gaza. In December 2023, Starmer followed Sunak in changing his stance by calling for a "sustainable ceasefire" in relation to Gaza, which also came after then foreign secretary David Cameron's same change in position. Starmer stated his support for a "two-stage" "two-state solution". On 18 February 2024, Starmer called for a "ceasefire that lasts" and said it must "happen now", having previously declined to call for one. In May 2024, Starmer said that he would support an independent Palestinian state as part of a peace process with Israel.

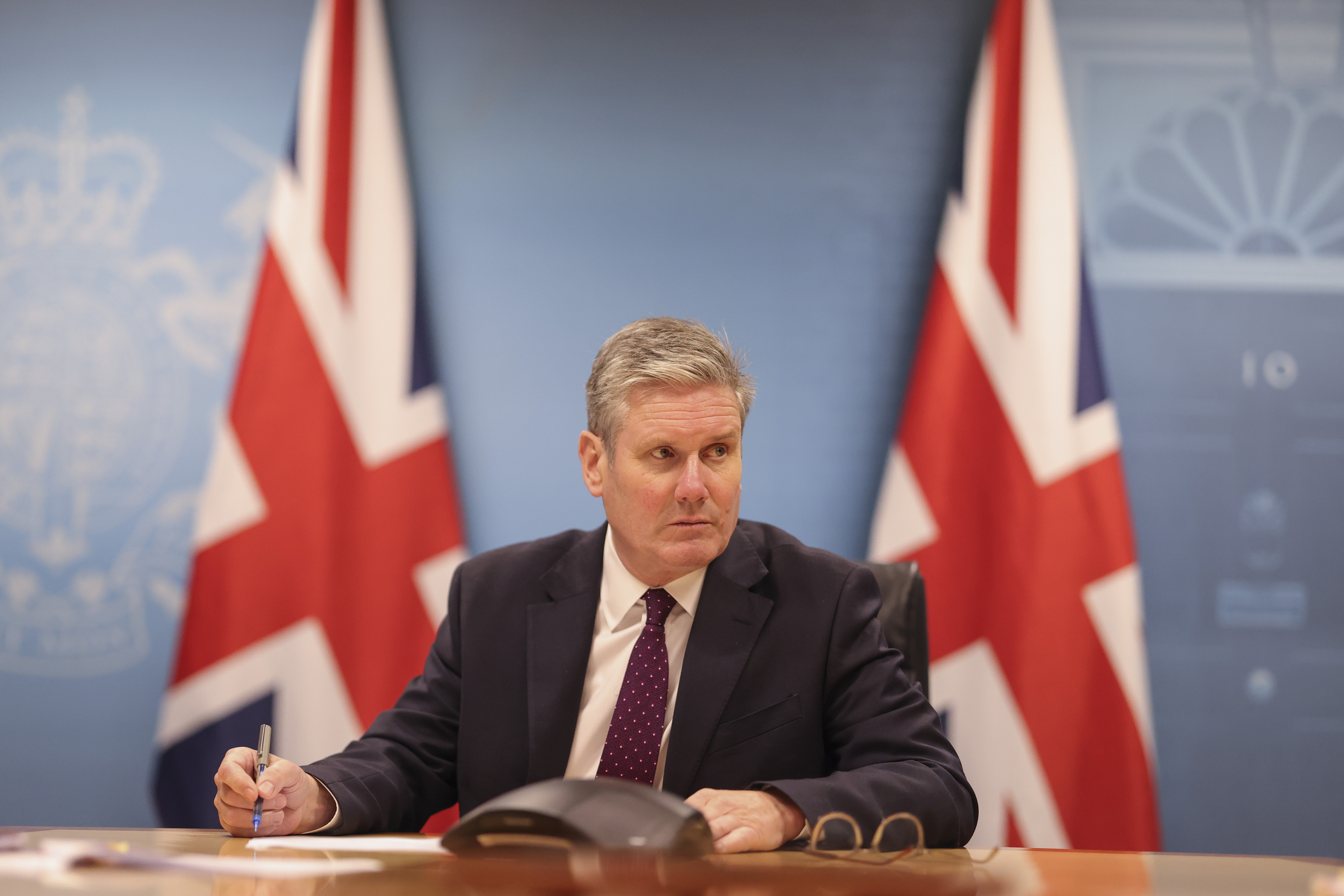
Starmer calling Israeli Prime Minister Benjamin Netanyahu, October 2024

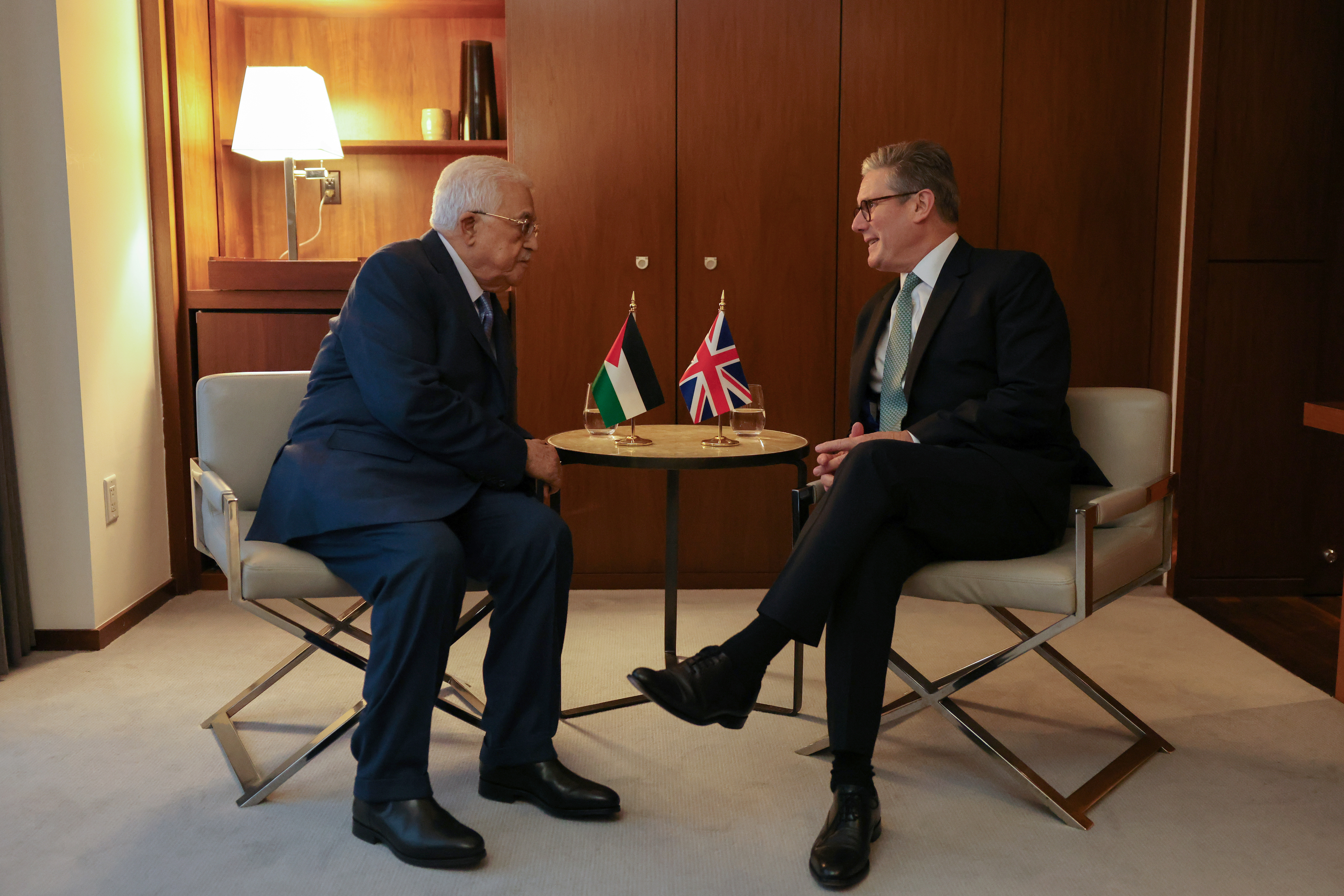
Starmer meeting with Mahmoud Abbas, President of Palestine, September 2024

Starmer's stance on the Gaza war, in particular his comments made to LBC in October 2023, was seen as contributing to a reduced number of seats for Labour in the 2024 general election, which the party ultimately won. Four independent candidates (Ayoub Khan, Adnan Hussain, Iqbal Mohamed and Shockat Adam), who campaigned on their opposition to the Gaza war, defeated Labour candidates in areas with large Muslim populations. When he became prime minister in July 2024, Starmer told Israeli prime minister Benjamin Netanyahu of the "urgent need for a ceasefire, the return of hostages and an immediate increase in the volume of humanitarian aid". He also assured Netanyahu that the UK would continue its "vital cooperation to deter malign threats" with Israel.

Licences of some British arms sales to Israel were suspended in September 2024 because of a "clear risk" the weapons could be used in breach of international law. Lammy announced the UK Government's suspension of 30 out of 350 arms export licences to Israel, affecting equipment such as parts for fighter jets, helicopters and drones. In November 2024, Starmer refused to call Israel's actions in Gaza "genocide".

After Israel's parliament banned UNRWA in October 2024, Starmer issued a statement saying he was "gravely concerned". He said "The humanitarian situation in Gaza is simply unacceptable" and "Only UNRWA can deliver humanitarian aid at the scale and pace needed".

On 18 March 2025, Foreign Secretary David Lammy admitted that Israel had breached international humanitarian law by blocking aid to the Gaza Strip. However, Starmer's government publicly rejected Lammy's statement to the House of Commons. A spokesman for Starmer's government said: "Our position remains that Israel's actions in Gaza are at clear risk of breaching international humanitarian law ... The government is not an international court, and, therefore, it is up to courts to make judgments". Asked whether Lammy should apologise, they added: "I'll leave that to the Foreign Office".

Starmer issued a joint statement in May 2025 condemning Israel's renewed offensive against Gaza. He called for Israel to immediately stop its military operations and to immediately allow humanitarian aid into Gaza. The statement condemned Israel's plan to ethnically cleanse the Gaza Strip as "abhorrent" and against international law. He said his government would take "concrete actions" if Israel continued its "egregious actions". Netanyahu accused Starmer of siding with Hamas, saying "you're on the wrong side of justice, you're on the wrong side of humanity and you're on the wrong side of history".
