= International Revolutionary Marxist Tendency =

Marxist group based in France

The International Revolutionary Marxist Tendency (IRMT), founded in 1965, was an international Marxist group based in France, led by Michel Pablo, also known as Michael Raptis, the former secretary of the Trotskyist Fourth International.

== History ==
IRMT resulted as a regroupment of activists expelled from the Fourth International over their opposition to the 1963 re-unification process with the so-called International Committee of the Fourth International (ICFI) which had split from the Fourth International in 1953 over the question of entrism sui generis, a form of entryism which involved eschewing overt organisation building efforts in favour of long term participation in social democratic and communist parties. The re-unification process was rushed while Pablo was imprisoned in the Netherlands for illegal activities in support of the Algerian revolution.

Once outside the Fourth International, the remaining supporters of Pablo first regrouped under the name International Revolutionary Marxist Tendency of the Fourth International (Tendance marxiste révolutionnaire internationale de la Quatrième Internationale, TMRIQI), who dropped the reference to the Fourth International and "Trotskyism" at their first conference in 1972 in favour of a policy of workers' self-management.

The IRMT would later be renamed again to "International Revolutionary Marxist Association" (Association Marxiste Révolutionnaire Internationale, AMRI).

Most of the national sections rejoined the reunited Fourth International (USFI) in 1992. According to Livio Maitan, Pablo himself did not rejoin the United Secretariat over "the situation of the revolutionary movement in Greece and important differences of opinion on the approach one should take to the war in former Yugoslavia", while others (N. Loudikis, Al Richardson etc.) claimed that the non-admission of Pablo was a condition for the readmission of the Organizations into the USFI.

As well as number of English-language publications in the 1960s and 1970, the British section, Socialist Alternatives, was behind the magazine Socialist Alternatives of which former UK Prime Minister and Labour Party leader Sir Keir Starmer was an editorial board member from 1986 to 1989.
