= Socialist Alternatives =

British Marxist group

Socialist Alternatives was the British section of the International Revolutionary Marxist Tendency (IRMT), a formerly Trotskyist Pabloite group based in Paris. Being a small group in the UK, it was best known for the Marxist magazine of the same name founded in Oxford by Ben Schoendorff and partially edited by Keir Starmer from 1986 to 1987, which was used by his supporters in the leadership election to show more left wing credentials. The magazine is believed to have been produced by the Pabloist International Revolutionary Marxist Tendency (IRMT), and advertised its events and publications, although one of the authors identified it as being an outgrowth of the Socialist Society connected with Ralph Miliband and Hilary Wainwright, who both wrote for the magazine. Paul Mason has called it a "Trotskyite front magazine", although this is disputed and its ex-editor Benjamin Schoendorff called it "post-Trotskyist". The French Trotskyist journalist Maurice Najman was also cited as a key supporter.

Its politics were defined by one of its later authors Andrew Coates as being "aligned to the European ‘alternative’ movements of the time which stood for ecology, feminism and self-management. These were forerunners of later radical green-left groups, Los Indignados, Podemos, the left of Labour and similar currents within social democratic parties." It was described by the left wing magazine Chartist as "the human face of the hard left". Peter Hitchens described Socialist Alternative's "preoccupation with sexual politics and green issues" as presaging the politics of all today's major British politicians.

The magazine included articles by Michalis Raptis, the leader of the International Revolutionary Marxist Tendency and the left wing Labour MP Eric Heffer, Peter Tatchell, as well as an interview with Tony Benn. There were also advertisements for Michael Raptis's "Self Management Lectures" and IRMT publications. Keir Starmer wrote articles on the Wapping strike, the 1986 TUC conference, criticising Labour leader Neil Kinnock's moves towards the market economy, a book review of Eric Heffer's Labour's Future, Trade Unions and pluralism, an interview with Benn, and left-wing approaches to local government. The magazine was still publishing in 1989, and also in 1994.
