= David Mills (solicitor) =

British corporate lawyer (born 1944)

- Born: David Mackenzie Donald Mills; 31 May 1944 (age 82); Oxted, Surrey, United Kingdom
- Occupation: Lawyer
- Spouse: Tessa Jowell (m. 1979; died 2018)
- Children: 5, including Eleanor and Jess
- Relatives: John Mills (brother)

David Mackenzie Donald Mills (born 31 May 1944) is a British corporate lawyer who specialises in international work for Italian companies. He was accused of money-laundering and alleged tax fraud involving Silvio Berlusconi; he was convicted in first instance and on appeal but the conviction was quashed by the Supreme Court of Cassation due to the statute of limitations. He is the widower of Labour Party politician Tessa Jowell following her death in May 2018. They were married in 1979 and separated in 2006, but had effectively reunited by 2012.

== Background and career ==
Mills was born in Oxted, Surrey, on 31 May 1944. According to The Independent, Mills's father Kenneth Mills was a senior spy. At the end of the Second World War, Kenneth Mills was running MI5's operations from Gibraltar. Later, he was transferred to Jamaica and—according to a family legend—personally foiled an attempted revolution in Cuba.

Mills is a former barrister who became a commercial solicitor in the 1980s. He is a former Labour member of Camden London Borough Council, and like others involved in the London Labour Party of the 1980s is close to the Blairite group of politicians and New Labour celebrities, to which his second wife Tessa Jowell belonged. He founded the niche private client law firm Mackenzie Mills, which merged with Withers Worldwide in October 1995.

== Berlusconi and "Jowellgate" ==
Mills acted in the early 1990s for Italian businessman and sometime Prime Minister Silvio Berlusconi. This became the cause of controversy and of allegations. Mills was involved in setting up a large number of offshore trusts for the "B Operation" as he termed Fininvest, Berlusconi's operations. Mills was investigated in Italy on allegations of money laundering and tax fraud. On 10 March 2006, prosecutors in Milan asked a judge to order Mills and Berlusconi to stand trial on corruption charges. Prosecutors submitted 15,000 pages of documents to the preliminary hearing judge who was to determine whether the case should go to full trial.

In February 2004, Mills had met his accountant Bob Drennan, a partner in the firm Rawlinson & Hunter, setting out the circumstances under which he had received a large amount of money from the "B people" as a gift, and admitting that he had "turned some very tricky corners, to put it mildly" which "had kept Mr B out of a great deal of trouble that I would have landed him in if I had said all I knew". He had set the pertinent facts out in a letter, which he handed to Drennan, apparently unaware that accountants are not protected by legal professional privilege and hence are obliged to report suspected illegal activity by their clients.

Mills admitted this story to Italian prosecutors but later retracted it and claimed that the money came from someone else. One source cited was Diego Attanasio, a shipping magnate and another Italian client of Mills. Attanasio denies this story. Questions were also asked about a woman living on a council estate in the East End of London, who is recorded as a director or company secretary of 19 companies that Mills established on behalf of his Italian clients.

In March 2006, after his wife Jowell claimed that Mills had not told her until four years after the event that he had been given £340,000 for his work for Silvio Berlusconi, the couple "agreed to a period of separation". The separation had effectively ended by September 2012. On 17 February 2009, an Italian court sentenced David Mills to four years and six months in jail for accepting a bribe from Berlusconi to give false evidence on his behalf in corruption trials in 1997 and 1998.

=== Appeal ===
His defence counsel said that he would appeal, claiming that the sentence went "against the logic and dynamic of the evidence presented". Jowell said "although we are separated I have never doubted his innocence". On 27 October 2009, the Appeal Court upheld his conviction and his sentence of 4½ years' imprisonment. He confirmed that he would initiate a second and final appeal to the Supreme Court of Cassation. On 25 February 2010, the Supreme Court of Cassation (the second and last court of appeal under Italian law) ruled a sentence of not guilty because the statute of limitations had expired.

=== Claim that he had lied to the Inland Revenue ===
In evidence given by videolink from London to a Milanese court in December 2011, Mills stated that his previous claim that Berlusconi had bribed him to the extent of $600,000 had been a lie prompted by the need to "provide to the Inland Revenue a story which explained why I had treated the money as a gift and not as income" and that the money had in reality been a stipend paid to him by Italian shipbuilder Diego Attanasio. He further stated that "Mr Berlusconi is entirely innocent in this case and had absolutely nothing to do with the 600,000 dollars which is the subject of the case. I wish to apologise to him for all the trouble that I've caused."

== Ecclestone ==
Mills was involved when Formula One Racing secured a derogation from European limits on tobacco advertising after Bernie Ecclestone contributed more than one million pounds to the Labour Party during the 1997 UK general election.

== Trading with Iran ==
In 2003, it was revealed that Mills was involved in an unsuccessful deal for Iranian airline Mahan Air to buy a fleet of BAe 146 aircraft from British Aerospace. He commented that the sale did not go through and that he was not granted any preferential treatment. However, Foreign Office Minister Baroness Symons gave advice to Mills on the political climate surrounding the project. It was subsequently disclosed that as a consequence of these dealings, Jowell had been excluded from Cabinet papers and talks on Iran since 2003.

== Personal life ==
Mills has three children from his first marriage, including the journalist Eleanor Mills, former editorial director of The Sunday Times. He has a son and daughter from his marriage to Tessa Jowell. In 2009, the couple owned houses in Warwickshire and in Kentish Town in north London. Jowell died on 12 May 2018, aged 70. Mills's brother John Mills was chairman of JML and was formerly a Labour councillor in Camden. John Mills was one of the largest donors to the Labour Party, and was married to Dame Barbara Mills QC, Director of Public Prosecutions, from 1992 to 1998, until her death in 2011.
