= International students in the United Kingdom =

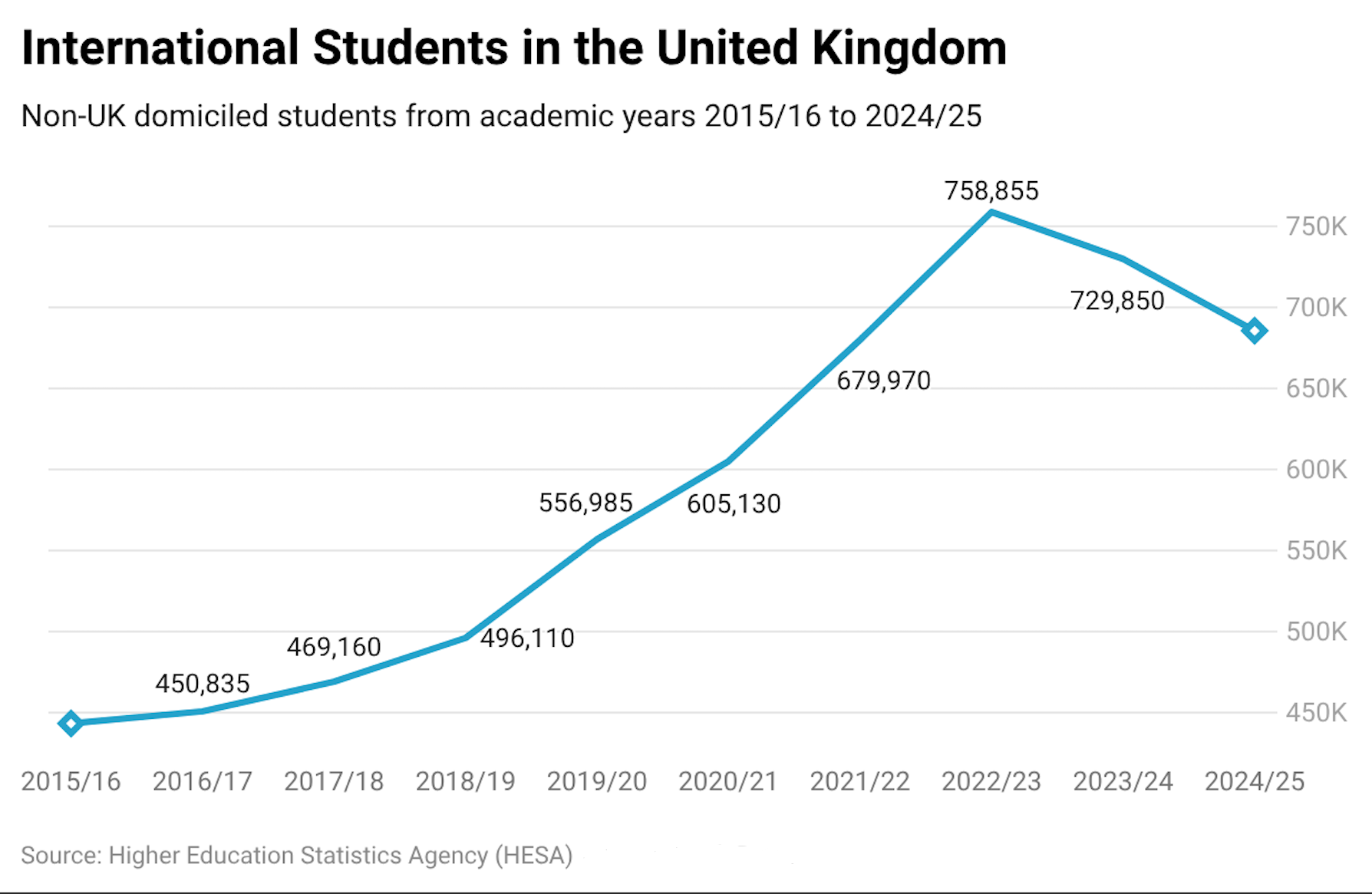
International Students in the United Kingdom between 2015/16 to 2024/25

The United Kingdom is among the world's most popular destinations for international students, regularly placing within the top four countries for hosting international students alongside the United States, Canada and Australia. Data from the Higher Education Statistics Agency indicates that students from the three countries of India, China, and Pakistan together account for just under half of all international students enrolled at higher education institutions in the UK.

In the 2024/25 academic year, there were 685,565 international students studying at UK higher education institutions, equivalent to 23.9% of all higher education students in the UK – ranging from 14.6% in Wales to 25.7% in Scotland. This represented a 6.1% decrease in international students from the previous year (2023/24: 729,850, 2022/23: 758,855 and 2021/22: 679,790).

The Universities and Colleges Admissions Service (UCAS) estimates that the number of international students will continue to increase with international applications to study at British universities expected to increase by 60%, from around 150,000 in 2022 to 240,000 in 2030. As of 2023, 58 current world leaders have been educated at a higher education institution in the United Kingdom, second in the world only to the United States' 65.

== Classification ==
=== By sending countries and regions ===
The top 15 countries and regions sending students to the United Kingdom in 2024/25 are listed below.

| Rank | Place of origin | Number of Students | Per cent of Total | YoY Change |
|---|---|---|---|---|
| 1 | India | 146,480 | 21.4% | −11.5% |
| 2 | China | 143,200 | 20.9% | −4.3% |
| 3 | Pakistan | 48,355 | 7.1% | +5.8% |
| 4 | Nigeria | 38,040 | 5.5% | −33.9% |
| 5 | Nepal | 24,435 | 3.6% | +92.3% |
| 6 | United States | 23,565 | 3.4% | +2.7% |
| 7 | Hong Kong | 15,755 | 2.3% | −8.6% |
| 8 | Malaysia | 11,800 | 1.7% | −7.5% |
| 9 | Bangladesh | 11,530 | 1.7% | −5.9% |
| 10 | Ireland | 9,800 | 1.4% | +1.3% |
| 11 | Saudi Arabia | 9,735 | 1.4% | +0.6% |
| 12 | United Arab Emirates | 8,875 | 1.3% | +5.6% |
| 13 | Canada | 8,105 | 1.2% | +3.4% |
| 14 | France | 7,840 | 1.1% | −9.5% |
| 15 | Turkey | 7,370 | 1.1% | +12.5% |
| Others | | 170,680 | 24.9% | —N/a |
| Total | | 685,565 | 100% | −6.1% |

In January 2026, Times Higher Education reported that UK institutions have overseen a record fall in the number of international students, largely as a result of fewer postgraduate taught students. The previous three largest cohorts of international students at British universities - India, China and Nigeria - all recorded reduced enrolments, with the number of Nigerian students more than halving from 2022 to 2024. However, not all regions recorded fewer students, with the number of students from Nepal at British universities 15 times higher in 2024 compared to four years ago.

=== By number of international students ===
The mainstream universities with the highest number of international students for 2024/25 are listed below:

| Rank | Institution | EU Students | Non-EU Students | Total International Students |
|---|---|---|---|---|
| 1 | University College London | 2,735 | 23,880 | 26,610 |
| 2 | University of Hertfordshire | 225 | 19,085 | 19,310 |
| 3 | University of Manchester | 1,055 | 17,460 | 18,515 |
| 4 | University of Edinburgh | 2,105 | 14,135 | 16,235 |
| 5 | King's College London | 2,385 | 13,305 | 15,690 |
| 6 | University of Glasgow | 1,210 | 12,670 | 13,880 |
| 7 | Coventry University | 415 | 12,885 | 13,300 |
| 8 | University of East London | 130 | 13,100 | 13,230 |
| 9 | University of Birmingham | 460 | 12,025 | 12,485 |
| 10 | University of the Arts London | 1,040 | 11,345 | 12,385 |

=== By proportion of international students ===
The mainstream universities with the highest proportion of international students for 2024/25 are listed below:

| Rank | Institution | International Students | Per cent of Student Body |
|---|---|---|---|
| 1 | London School of Economics | 8,225 | 63.5% |
| 2 | University of Hertfordshire | 19,310 | 57.5% |
| 3 | University of the Arts London | 12,385 | 54.0% |
| 4 | Imperial College London | 11,905 | 52.9% |
| 5 | University College London | 26,610 | 51.9% |
| 6 | University of East London | 13,230 | 49.5% |
| 7 | University College Birmingham | 3,180 | 47.0% |
| 8 | Roehampton University | 5,560 | 46.6% |
| 9 | University of St Andrews | 5,370 | 46.1% |
| 10 | Coventry University | 13,300 | 45.1% |

=== By number of international undergraduate applications ===
British universities received a total of 605,495 international applications in the 2023–24 application cycle. Fifteen universities received more than 10,000 applications, accounting for over half of the total (310,735). These were:

| Institution | Number of international applications | Percentage of applications | Number of international acceptances | Percentage of acceptances |
|---|---|---|---|---|
| UCL | 43,230 | 55.2% | 4,590 | 50.4% |
| Manchester | 36,990 | 40.0% | 3,630 | 36.4% |
| King's | 32,090 | 46.8% | 2,645 | 34.0% |
| Edinburgh | 29,280 | 43.1% | 2,670 | 35.4% |
| Imperial | 19,765 | 59.9% | 1,525 | 46.8% |
| Bristol | 18,580 | 29.4% | 1,460 | 19.5% |
| Leeds | 18,135 | 26.7% | 1,750 | 20.6% |
| Warwick | 17,480 | 38.8% | 1,570 | 26.0% |
| LSE | 16,530 | 58.6% | 950 | 49.0% |
| Arts London | 16,000 | 46.3% | 2,285 | 39.6% |
| Birmingham | 14,925 | 25.9% | 1,815 | 21.2% |
| Southampton | 13,685 | 31.5% | 1,115 | 21.5% |
| QMUL | 12,480 | 29.4% | 890 | 18.6% |
| Durham | 11,285 | 32.4% | 1,145 | 20.5% |
| Sheffield | 10,280 | 23.7% | 865 | 15.4% |

== Graduate route for international students ==
On 14 October 2019, the Home Office confirmed that graduates of the country's higher education institutions will be eligible for the two-year Graduate Route visa from summer 2021.

In July 2020, the Department for Business, Energy and Industrial Strategy revealed that international students who complete a PhD from Summer 2021 can stay in the UK for 3 years after study to live and work with the Graduate Route visa, as opposed to 2 years for undergraduate and postgraduate students. The UK Home Office also confirmed that dependants of postgraduate international students with a Graduate Route post study work visa from 2021 will retain leave to remain and the right to work in the UK provided they were in the country with them during the international student's postgraduate studies.

In May 2025, the newly-elected Labour government released its immigration white paper containing its proposals to reduce migration. Measures included reducing the term of the graduate visa to 18 months, new English language requirements for dependants of students and a new levy and tougher requirements for sponsoring institutions. Proposals to limit the graduate route by the Home Office were spurred by concerns over the number of international students moving into the asylum system and the number entering low-paid work. The Migration Advisory Committee found that 60 per cent of people on a graduate visa earned less than £30,000 after 12 months on the scheme, although its investigation also concluded that there was "no evidence" of the scheme being abused and recommended that the scheme should be kept.

In February 2026, data released by the Office for National Statistics found that the re-introduction of the graduate visa significantly changed the behaviour of international students. By June 2025, 62 per cent of non-EU students and their family members who arrived within the past two years had transitioned to a new visa to stay in the UK, which was significantly up compared to the 17 per cent recorded for the period between June 2018 and June 2020. The proportion of students from EU countries who switched to a new visa was largely unchanged in the same period at about 13 per cent.

== International education strategy ==
In 2019, the UK government's International Education Strategy set a target to recruit 600,000 international students in higher education and to increase the value of higher education exports to £35 billion by 2030.

The recruitment target was met a decade earlier - in only one year. In January 2026, the newly elected Labour government released its new International Education Strategy which set to increase education exports to £40 billion by 2030, equivalent to an extra £7 billion in four years. Unlike the 2019 strategy, this strategy did not include a target to recruit a specific number of students and instead committed to the sustainable recruitment of “high-quality international students”. The new strategy identified transnational education, where students study for a UK qualification outside of the country through a branch campus or online, as a focal point.

== Economic impact of students ==
In the UK government's 2026 International Education Strategy paper, education exports were worth £32.3 billion in 2022 – placing it ahead of other sectors such as automotive and food and drink. As raising tuition fees for UK students or increasing direct support from the government is politically difficult, successive governments have swung between encouraging universities to recruit students from other countries to make up the shortfall in their budget from the underfunding of UK students and discouraging foreign students to reduce immigration.

London Economics, a policy and economics consultancy, has estimated one first-year cohort of international students in 2018/19 to deliver £25.9 billion net benefit to the British economy over the course of their study. They upgraded this figure to a net benefit of £37.4 billion for the 2021/22 academic year. University College London's revenue from international tuition fees alone was worth over half a billion pounds – the equivalent of a third of the annual overseas earnings of the entire UK fishing industry. This figure has grown about 56% in three years to £780 million in the 2024/25 academic year. International students were found to make the greatest impact in the cities of Glasgow, London, Sheffield, Nottingham and Newcastle.

According to data from the Higher Education Statistics Agency for the 2021/22 academic year, higher education institutions in the UK received tuition fees and contracts worth £9.99 billion from international students (£1.06 billion from EU students and £8.93 billion from non-EU students). International tuition fees made up the largest proportion of tuition fees income at the following mainstream universities with all ancient universities of Scotland and London members of the golden triangle featuring:

| Rank | Institution | Total non-UK fees (£m) | Total tuition fees income (£m) | Non-UK fees as % of tuition fees income |
|---|---|---|---|---|
| 1 | University of Glasgow | 290,304 | 380,717 | 76.3% |
| 2 | Imperial College London | 301,355 | 423,195 | 71.2% |
| 3 | University of St Andrews | 96,539 | 137,407 | 70.3% |
| 4 | University College London | 543,844 | 778,553 | 69.9% |
| 5 | University of Edinburgh | 341,988 | 496,955 | 68.8% |
| 6 | University of Aberdeen | 61,808 | 89,923 | 68.7% |
| 7 | London School of Economics | 180,270 | 265,772 | 67.8% |
| 8 | University of the Arts London | 206,757 | 326,337 | 63.4% |
| 9 | University of Manchester | 394,981 | 638,205 | 61.9% |
| 10 | King's College London | 369,904 | 610,493 | 60.6% |

A study in 2025 by Public First and the University of York found that higher education of international students contributed a gross export value of over £20 billion annually and that, due to the presence of international students, higher education was the biggest export in 26 of the UK's 650 parliamentary constituencies and one of the top three exports in 102 constituencies. The direct and additional exports supported by international students made up over a quarter of all exports from seven constituencies: East Ham (home to the University of East London, Streatham and Croydon North, Ilford South, City of Durham (home to Durham University), Edinburgh South (home to the University of Edinburgh), Manchester Rusholme (home to the University of Manchester and Manchester Metropolitan University), and Hendon (home to Middlesex University London).

== Controversies and concerns ==
=== Asylum claims ===
In March 2026, Shabana Mahmood, Home Secretary of the Labour government, announced that study visas would begin to be halted for students from Afghanistan, Cameroon, Myanmar and Sudan owing to the high number of students from the four countries moving into the asylum system, either during studies or after their study visas expired. Collectively, 3,880 international students from the four countries were enrolled across British universities in the 2024/25 academic year, the equivalent of 0.57% of international students in the United Kingdom (Myanmar: 2,665, Cameroon: 575, Afghanistan: 355, and Sudan: 285). Since 2021, 95% of students from Afghanistan have applied for asylum after entering the United Kingdom through a study visa, while rates for asylum claim have increased 16-fold for students from Myanmar and by more than 3-fold for students from Cameroon and Sudan.

Concerns had previously been raised about the number of international students moving into the asylum system. In 2024, around 40,000 asylum seekers had previously held a UK visa, with study visas making up about 40 per cent of this figure. The Labour government's immigration white paper in 2025 found that the majority of asylum claims were made as their visa expiry date was approaching which suggested "some people might therefore be using the student route to make claims for humanitarian protection when circumstances in their country have not changed". Previous Labour Home Secretaries have also criticised the number of international students claiming asylum, when figures in 2025 revealed that about 15,000 international students were claiming asylum every year, Yvette Cooper vowed to 'clamp down' on the practice. Another former Labour Home Secretary, Jack Straw, commenting on the issue in a higher education conference stated: "Everybody knows it’s a racket. And there are a lot of people, particularly immigration advisors and lawyers, who are making money out of this racket".

=== Net migration and dependants ===
In 2022, Suella Braverman, then Home Secretary of the Conservative government, wanted to curb the number of international students and in particular, the number of dependants on student visas. The number of dependants accompanying international students granted visas had increased eight-fold in three years to 135,788 in 2022, with Nigerian and Indian nationals bringing the most dependants. In 2015, dependants from the two countries accounted for 11% of all dependants, at around 1,500 individuals. By 2022, this grew to over 100,000 individuals, representing about 73% of all dependants. Nigerian nationals had a main applicant to dependency ratio exceeding one – 10 times the rate for all other countries except for India. In 2022/23, 60,923 dependants accompanied 59,053 Nigerian students and 38,990 dependants accompanied 139,539 Indian students. In the previous year, 34,031 Nigerian students arrived in the United Kingdom with 31,898 dependant visas issued alongside them, in contrast, 114,837 Chinese students arrived in the same period with only 401 dependant visas issued alongside them. Local reporting in Nigeria has credited the growth in students and dependants to the broader movement of 'Japa', a Yoruba term meaning 'to scarper' Nigeria, with no intention of returning due to the country's problem with corruption and poor governance. Reporting from the BBC suggested that some Nigerians are willing to study for degrees they do not need in order to have a 'stepping stone' into the UK with the prospect of free education for their dependants in the UK preferable to paying for private education in Nigeria.

Braverman faced opposition to these plans from then Chancellor of the Exchequer, Jeremy Hunt, then Secretary of State for Education, Gillian Keegan and then Science Minister, George Freeman who were concerned that this may damage the prospects of the country's 'science superpower' ambitions. In May 2023, the Home Office announced plans to restrict the ability to bring dependants to only postgraduate courses designated as research programmes, effective from January 2024. As the new restrictions came into place, exemptions were also extended to courses with government-funded scholarships.

In the first quarter of 2024, the number of dependant visas issued for students fell by 80% compared to the previous year. Visas issued for international students also fell by 15%. In the first five months of 2025, study visas resurged and saw a 29% increase compared to 2024, and higher than both 2023 and 2022. Family member visas remained significantly lower compared to previous years, with only 6,300 applications recorded compared to 46,700 applications in the same period of 2023. One study abroad education provider suggested that the strong demand was due to "global politics" as Australia, Canada and the United States had enforced stricter visa rules for international students and unease over recent US policies. Further reporting has suggested that this "surge" was short-lived, with study visas falling by 22 per cent for the last quarter of 2025 compared to the previous year. Applications for family member visas in January continued to fall to 1,400 in January.

Some universities have pivoted to offering new MRes degrees which would enable dependant visas for international students. In 2022, no international students studied for a MRes degree at the universities of Greater Manchester, Wolverhampton, Gloucestershire and York St John University; however by 2024, each institution now recorded hundreds of international students studying for a MRes. Overall, the number of international students studying for a MRes increased 135 per cent from 2023 to 2024. In February 2026, the Home Office warned that it would restrict student visas further if there was evidence of abuse.

=== Over reliance on students from China ===
The United Kingdom remains one of the most desirable countries for Chinese students looking to study abroad, ahead of the USA, Australia, and Canada. This has led to students from mainland China making up significant proportions of international students at some universities: Southampton: 60.5%; RCA: 59.8%; Sheffield: 57.8%; York: 56.2%; Birmingham: 50.3%; and Manchester: 49.9%. In 2021/22, Southampton doubled its income from international students to £170 million in just one year.

Research from the centre-right think tank Onward has estimated that the average university makes 7% of their total fee income from China-domiciled students, with 16 universities (mainly Russell Group) receiving more than a fifth of their fee income from China-domiciled students. There are concerns that universities are becoming overly reliant on international students from China for financing and increasing geopolitical shifts between China and the United Kingdom may lead to a sudden drop in recruitment. Adam Habib, Director of SOAS, has argued that the majority of universities in the United Kingdom will be severely impacted financially in this event. In response, the university sector is aiming to diversify its intake and has been targeting emerging markets in India, South Asia and Nigeria. In 2022, for the first time, more study visas were issued to Indian nationals than Chinese nationals. According to the Higher Education Policy Institute, in 2023, 84% of Chinese graduates in the United Kingdom returned to China after finishing their studies.

=== Use of agents ===
UK universities spend millions of pounds on agents fees, with universities that provided data in response to freedom of information requests typically reporting fees of between £2,000 and £8,000 per student. Large recruiting agencies in India can receive between 15 and 30% of the university fees paid by students the recruit. The University of Greenwich paid more than £28.7 million to recruit almost 3,000 postgraduate and 500 undergraduate students, while De Montfort University paid £17.1 million to recruit almost 4,500 students.

The report also highlighted that there were ethical concerns around agents, with the general secretary of the Indian National Student Association, a representative body for Indian students in the UK, saying that agents had tried to direct students onto certain courses by offering incentives, regardless of whether these were a good choice for the student. Former universities minister Jo Johnson also warned that unethical agents that falsified visa paperwork could put universities' licences at risk. As different universities pay different commission rates, advice from agents is often affected by which universities pay them the most.

In order to address ethical concerns, the UK Agent Quality Framework, administered by the British Universities International Liaison Association, was launched in 2022. A formal 'universities pledge' to follow the framework was introduced in 2023 and signed initially by 28 institutions, including Bangor University, Durham University, the University of East Anglia, the University of Edinburgh and the Ulster University.
