= 2024 Keir Starmer speech on migration =

The British prime minister Keir Starmer gave a speech on 28 November 2024 concerning immigration to the United Kingdom.

== Background ==
The 2024 general election resulted in a landslide victory for the Labour Party led by Keir Starmer. The combined vote share for Labour and the Conservatives reached a record low, with smaller parties doing well. Labour returned to being the largest party in Scotland and remained so in Wales. The election was noted as the most disproportionate in modern British history, mainly as a result of the first-past-the-post voting system. Starmer won a landslide victory at the general election and became Prime Minister, but with the smallest share of the electoral vote of any majority government since record-keeping of the popular vote began in 1830.

By the end of 2024, opinion polling for the Labour Party and Starmer's personal approval ratings had dropped significantly following several controversies including the backlash to the abolition of the Winter Fuel Payment, the riots during the summer, the freebies controversy involving Lord Alli and Taylor Swift concert tickets, and the farmers' protests. Controversy over Starmer's support for Israel in the Gaza war, which began during his tenure as Leader of the Opposition and led to Labour losing several seats in the election, continued into his premiership despite Starmer calling for a ceasefire. This culminated in a petition calling for an early general election on the UK Parliament website being started in November 2024 by the publican and Conservative voter Michael Westwood, who said he launched it because he believed the Labour government had "gone back on the promises" the party had made. Within days, the petition reached over 2 million signatures. Starmer responded to the petition by stating, "I’m not surprised, quite frankly, that as we’re doing the tough stuff there are plenty of people who say 'well I’m impacted, I don’t like it'. But we’ve got to make the big calls on the NHS and on schools that are really important for the here and now and for the future."

Under Starmer's leadership, the Labour Party's position on immigration has shifted significantly towards advocating reduced immigration.

== Summary ==
Starmer began the speech by claiming that "the previous Government were running an open borders experiment". He then stated that the Conservative Party had promised to reduce immigration levels into the UK, but had failed and had done so on purpose; he said that "Brexit was used for that purpose – to turn Britain into a one-nation experiment in open borders. Global Britain – remember that slogan. That is what they meant. A policy with no support and which they then pretended wasn't happening." He described this as "unforgivable".

Starmer continued by talking about immigration and the economy, pointing to a number of factors that he claimed "have left our economy hopelessly reliant on immigration", including the number of people on long-term sick leave and reductions in apprenticeships.

He then pledged that the government would publish a white paper detailing a plan to reduce immigration, with input from the Migration Advisory Committee. He also listed a number of immigration reforms that would be included in the plan, such as reforms to the points-based immigration system, crackdowns on employer abuse of visa routes, and increased deportations. He also announced a deal with the government of Iraq including subsidies for Iraqi police, which he described as "a world-first, that will help us smash the people smuggling gangs and secure our borders".

Starmer continued by claiming that "securing our borders is the issue that matters to working people" alongside the economy and the NHS, saying that people "want order and security, borders that we control, an NHS that protects you, an economy that offers secure work and good opportunities." He finished by saying that his government "will not rest until the foundations are fixed, borders are secure, and Britain is rebuilt".

== Reactions ==
Tobias Phibbs of the Common Good Foundation and Blue Labour praised the speech, saying that "across Europe, social democrats are leading the way in reasserting a world of nation-states and borders" and that "ending the deliberate policy of mass immigration is a rejection of the free market lie that human beings are fungible units that can pass undifferentiated across the smooth surface of the globe, and it allows us to move beyond the era of asymmetric globalisation". The Conservatives' leader Kemi Badenoch said that there had been "collective failure of political leaders from all parties over decades" allowing excessive immigration levels, and that she "as the new leader accept responsibility and say truthfully, we got this wrong".

The former Conservative MP David Gauke described the speech as "the sort of hard-hitting language that Farage might use", saying that while immigration levels "are too high to maintain public support", the speech may fuel the rise of the Reform UK party as it "validates the argument that reducing immigration merely requires the will to do so, and it does nothing to explain the trade-offs to the public".

Steve Valdez-Symonds of Amnesty International argued that there should be "no compromising on the need for asylum in a world torn by conflict, authoritarianism and oppression" and called for Starmer's government to "play its full and fair part in providing safety for people forced to flee abuses rather than continuing the last government's long and disastrous attempt to evade this responsibility."

== See also ==
- "Plan for Change", another major speech given by Starmer one week later
- The 2025 "island of strangers" speech
- History of UK immigration control
