= Adjudicator's Office =

UK non-departmental public body

- Formation: 1993; 33 years ago
- Type: Non-departmental public body
- The Adjudicator: Mike McMahon
- Website: www.gov.uk/government/organisations/the-adjudicator-s-office

The Adjudicator’s Office is a UK non-departmental public body which was set up in 1993, initially to look into complaints about the Inland Revenue (including the Valuation Office Agency). HM Customs and Excise and the Contributions Agency joined in 1995. From 2003 the office also took on complaints about The Insolvency Service. In April 2005, the role continued in relation to HM Revenue and Customs (HMRC), which was formed by the merger of the Inland Revenue and HM Customs and Excise.

In March 2015, the Adjudicator was asked to become the independent reviewer for complaints about HM Treasury, Pension Wise. There were no complaints from Pension Wise during its first year. Following the move of Pension Wise to the Department for Work and Pensions (DWP), from 1 April 2016, Pension Wise complaints have been considered by DWP. The Insolvency Service took its investigation of complaints in house in early 2016–17.

In relation to the Home Office, the adjudicator will review a Windrush Compensation Scheme decision or the conduct of a compensation claim on request.

The Adjudicator is an independent appointment agreed by the organisations for which they adjudicate.

== List of adjudicators ==
- Barbara Mills until 1999 - 2009.
  - She was appointed Adjudicator for the Inland Revenue and Customs and Excise, in April 1999. The bodies merged in 2005.
- Judy Clements 2009 - 2016
- Helen Megarry April 2016 – 2023.
- Mike McMahon October 2023 –

== Further Information ==
- Website: http://www.adjudicatorsoffice.gov.uk
