= John Mills (businessman) =

British businessman (1938–2025)

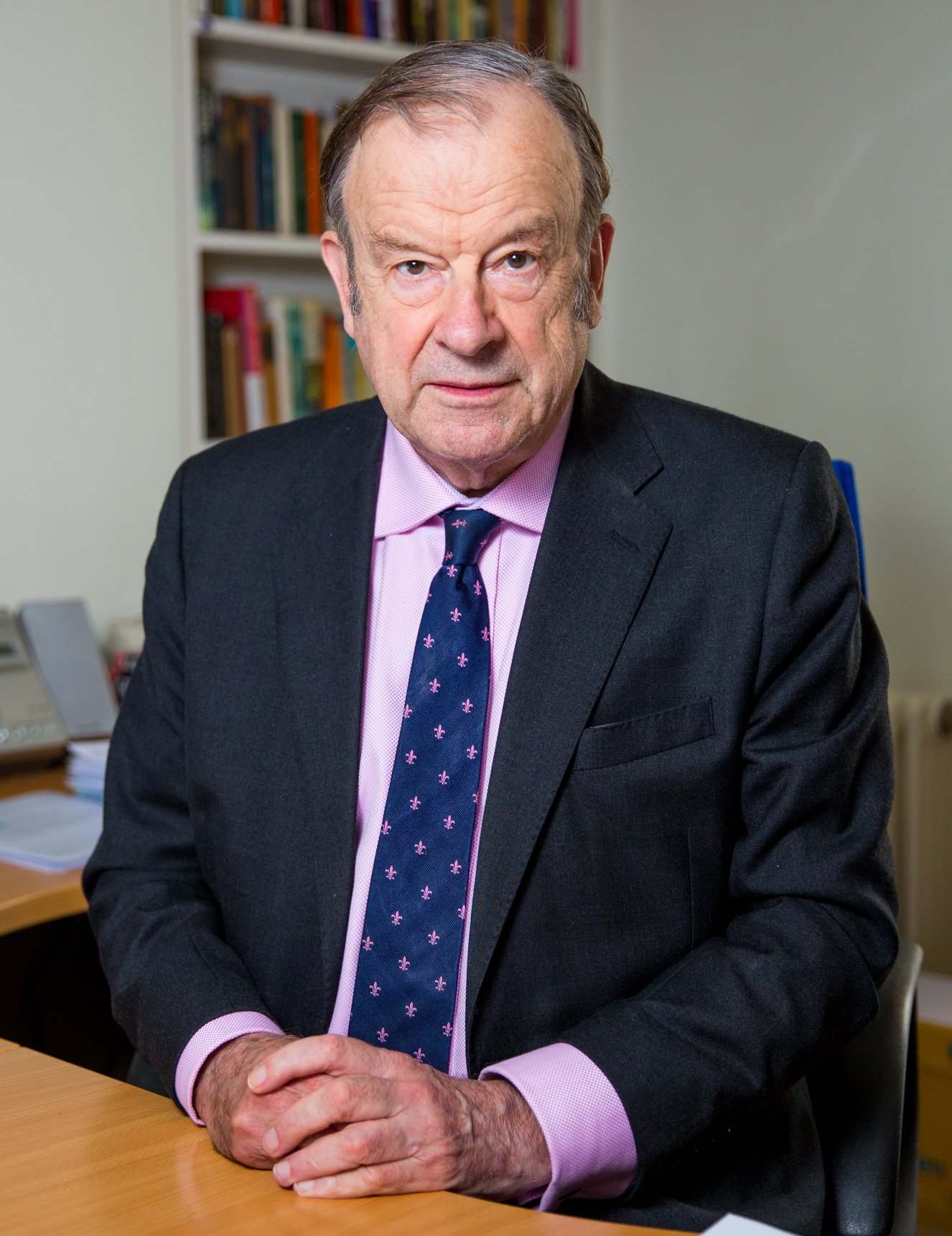
- Mills in 2016
- Born: John Angus Donald Mills; 8 May 1938; Hampstead Garden Suburb, London
- Died: 6 April 2025 (aged 86)
- Resting place: Highgate Cemetery
- Education: Glenalmond College; Merton College, Oxford
- Occupations: Businessman, economist
- Known for: Founder and chairman of JML)
- Spouse: Barbara Warnock (m. 1962; died 2011) Marjorie Wallace (m. 2021)
- Children: 4
- Relatives: David Mills (brother); Eleanor Mills (niece); Jess Mills (niece)
- Website: johnmillsuk.com

John Angus Donald Mills (8 May 1938 – 6 April 2025) was a British businessman and economist. He founded British consumer products company JML, and was its chairman and majority shareholder. In May 2020, Mills launched The John Mills Institute for Prosperity, a cross-party research initiative focused on achieving higher rates of economic growth.

== Early life ==
Mills was born in Hampstead Garden Suburb on 8 May 1938, the son of British Army Colonel Kenneth Mills. Mills' brother is lawyer David Mills, who was married to Tessa Jowell, a former Labour Party Cabinet minister. Educated at Glenalmond College in Scotland, Mills then studied Philosophy, Politics and Economics at Merton College, Oxford. Searching for extra income as a student, he started selling household cleaning goods door-to-door, and in 1958 hired a plane to fly fellow students to Canada for summer jobs, making a profit by selling off the seats, while also selling household cleaning products door to door.

== Career ==
After two years of National Service, he joined Unilever's graduate scheme, but quit after six months to start his own business. Mills founded Fairlane UK Ltd. which initially sold imported products at trade fairs and exhibitions, and latterly manufactured them. As the pound rose during Margaret Thatcher's government, Fairlane UK went out of business in 1984. Charged by Trading Standards for selling brass trinkets as gold-plated jewellery, he pleaded guilty and was fined £750. In 1986, Mills went on to found JML in the basement of his house in Camden, England. The company sells consumer products through in-store video, TV shopping channels, and the internet. It is based in London and Tyne Dock in the North East of England.

== Economics and politics ==
=== Labour Party ===
Mills was a supporter and major donor to the Labour Party. He served as a councillor for the party in the London Borough of Camden for most of the period between 1971 and 2006. During his tenure on Camden council, he held a number of political appointments, including Deputy Chairman of the London Docklands Corporation, Chair of the Housing Committee at the Association of Metropolitan Authorities and the London Boroughs Association, and Chair of both the Housing and Finance Committees of the London Borough of Camden.

Mills contested Chipping Barnet at both general elections in February and October 1974, but was defeated both times by the Conservative Party former Chancellor of the Exchequer, Reginald Maudling. He was also a Labour candidate in the 1979 European Parliamentary election. In 2013, Mills donated £1,650,000 to the Labour Party in JML shares, making him the party's biggest financial donor.

=== European Union and Brexit ===
A life-long Eurosceptic, Mills has been the Secretary of the Labour Euro-Safeguards Campaign since 1975. Mills has served on the board of various Eurosceptic lobby groups. In the lead up to the 2016 United Kingdom European Union membership referendum, Mills was Chair of The People's Pledge, Co-Chairman of Business for Britain, and Chair of Labour for a Referendum. He was the Vice Chair of the Economic Research Council and founder of Labour Future.

During the referendum, Mills served as the Chair and then Vice Chair of Vote Leave, the official designated campaign group for Britain to exit the European Union. In April 2016, Mills left Vote Leave to run Labour Leave which campaigned among left of centre voters for Brexit. In July 2018, he resigned from Labour Leave, Labour Future, The Pound Campaign, Business for Brexit, and Labour for Britain, to comply with Ofcom requirements and to avoid any conflict of interest through also running a TV shopping channel.

=== Economics ===
During his career, Mills was an economist and author. He was a noted campaigner for a managed exchange rate policy, which sees sterling at parity with the dollar. He believed that reindustrialisation could increase the UK's economic growth rate by up to 2% per annum. Mills published a series of books on economics, exchange rate policy, the Eurozone, and manufacturing, subjects on which he also blogged. His published books include A Critical History of Economics, Managing the World Economy, and Britain’s Achilles Heel. In September 2020, Mills published The Elephant in the Room, a book on why Britain needs to rebalance its economy after 40 years of deindustrialisation.

In 2018, Mills launched the IPPR Economic Prize, which was run by the Institute for Public Policy Research. The prize awarded £100,000 for the best proposal to increase UK economic growth. Mills sat on the judging panel alongside Stephanie Flanders, John Eatwell, and Helena Morrissey. In May 2020, Mills, in his own capacity, launched the John Mills Institute for Prosperity. The Institute seeks to provide policymakers with fresh ideas for economic growth. It launched with a report into how Britain can recover from the impact of COVID-19 through a manufacturing revival.

== In popular culture ==
Mills was portrayed by Nicholas Day in the 2019 Channel 4 drama, Brexit: The Uncivil War.

== Personal life and death ==
Mills was married to barrister Barbara Mills, who from 1992 to 1998 was Director of Public Prosecutions, from July 1962, shortly after they both graduated from Oxford, until her death in May 2011. The couple had a son and three daughters. Mills lived in London. In 1995, he was stabbed and seriously injured in a mugging in North London. The muggers went on to be involved in the murder of Philip Lawrence later in 1995.

In 2018, Mills founded the John Mills Charitable Trust, which supports research causes. He was a supporter of the mental health charity SANE, of whom his partner Marjorie Wallace is chief executive. The couple were married in 2021. Mills used to hold a pilot's licence. He flew private Cessna aircraft, and, aged 66, he qualified to fly his own Citation jet. Other interests of his included opera, theatre, cinema and tennis. Mills died on 6 April 2025, at the age of 86. His ashes are buried in Highgate Cemetery with those of his ex-wife.

== Selected publications ==
- Why Trump Won (Labour Future Ltd, November 2016)
- Brexit Economics: How to make the UK economy the powerhouse of Europe whatever happens with the Brexit negotiations (Labour Future, April 2017)
- Britain's Achilles Heel: Our Uncompetitive Pound (Civitas, May 2017)
- Raising Productivity (Labour Future, February 2018)
- Manufacturing a Recovery from Coronavirus (The Institute for Prosperity, May 2020)
- The Elephant in the Room (Civitas, September 2020)

== See also ==
- Labour for a Referendum
