= Barbara Mills =

British barrister, DBC and QC (1940–2011)

Dame Barbara Mills DBE, QC

Director of Public Prosecutions
- In office 1992–1998
- Preceded by: Sir Alan Green
- Succeeded by: Sir David Calvert-Smith

Personal details
- Born: Barbara Jean Warnock; 10 August 1940 Chorleywood, Hertfordshire, England
- Died: 28 May 2011 (aged 70)
- Resting place: Highgate Cemetery, London, England
- Party: Labour
- Spouse: John Mills (m. 1962)
- Children: 4
- Education: St. Helen's School
- Alma mater: Lady Margaret Hall, Oxford
- Occupation: Barrister

Dame Barbara Jean Lyon Mills DBE, QC (née Warnock; 10 August 1940 – 28 May 2011) was a British barrister. She held various senior public appointments including Director of Public Prosecutions, and was widely seen as a pioneer for women gaining such appointments in the higher echelons of the legal profession. At the time of her death she was chair of the Professional Oversight Board.

== Early life and education ==
She was born in Chorleywood, the daughter of John and Nora Warnock. Her father was a chartered accountant. She was educated at St. Helen's School, Northwood, where she became head girl, and then studied law at Lady Margaret Hall, Oxford, graduating in the second class in 1962.

== Career ==
Mills was called to the Bar from the Middle Temple in 1963. She became a barrister at 3 Temple Gardens in 1967, in chambers headed by Edward Cussens. She had a successful career as a barrister, specialising in criminal prosecution. She became a prosecuting counsel in 1977, then junior Treasury Counsel at the Central Criminal Court in 1981. She secured the convictions of Michael Fagan, an Irish vagrant who broke into Buckingham Palace in 1982 and stole a bottle of wine, exposing the Palace's lax security; of the Brighton bomber Patrick Magee in 1986; and of the Guinness Four in 1990. She defended Winston Silcott when he was tried for the murder of Keith Blakelock in the Broadwater Farm riot in 1985; Silcott was convicted in 1987, but the conviction was quashed on appeal in 1991.

She became a recorder in 1982, and took silk to become a Queen's Counsel in 1986. She was a member of the Criminal Injuries Compensation Board from 1988 to 1990, a legal assessor of the General Medical Council and the General Dental Council, and a member of the Parole Board from 1990.

She was Director of the Serious Fraud Office (SFO) from 1990 to 1992, during investigations of Barlow Clowes, Blue Arrow, Robert Maxwell's Mirror Group, and Polly Peck. During that period, the SFO was investigating a company set up by her brother-in-law David Mills, then husband of Labour cabinet minister Tessa Jowell, in connection with bribery allegations against Silvio Berlusconi, but declined to investigate Mills himself. David Mills was later found guilty of accepting a cash bribe from Berlusconi, but the conviction was quashed by Italy's Supreme Court of Cassation.

From 1992 to 1998 she was Director of Public Prosecutions, the first woman to hold that position. As DPP she also served as the second head of the Crown Prosecution Service, with 6,000 staff considering the prosecution of 1.4 million cases each year. During her term in this office, levels of bureaucracy in the CPS were high and morale was low. She worked to increase the efficiency of the CPS, and introduced victim impact statements.

After a report by the West Yorkshire Police into abuses at the West Midlands Serious Crime Squad, she agreed that there was insufficient evidence to prosecute any of the officers at the squad, a decision for which she was widely criticised. She was criticised when the CPS declined to prosecute suspects for the murder of Stephen Lawrence in 1993. She resigned in 1998 after she was criticised in reports by Gerald Butler and Sir Iain Glidewell for repeatedly refusing to bring prosecutions over deaths in police custody. She also ordered a 75-year embargo restriction on the Devon and Cornwall Police Investigation of failures by West Midlands Police in the Birmingham Six scandal of 1974. On 1 June 2016 the Coroner re-opened the inquests after a 42-year adjournment, a decision opposed by West Midlands Police.

She was appointed as Adjudicator for Inland Revenue and for HM Customs and Excise on 26 April 1999, a part-time role independent of those departments, dealing with complaints from members of the public who are not satisfied with how the departments dealt with their complaints. Mills retained the role as Adjudicator for HM Revenue and Customs when those bodies were merged in 2005, and held this post until 2009.

Mills also held a number of other public appointments. She was governor of London Guildhall University from 1999 and then its successor London Metropolitan University from 2002 to 2007, and was chair of the council of the Women's Library from 2001 to 2007. She was also a non-executive director of the Royal Free Hampstead NHS Trust from 2000 to 2007. She was the chair of the Professional Oversight Board of the Financial Reporting Council from 2008 until her death. She was a trustee of Victim Support from 1999 to 2004.

== Personal life ==
Mills married John Mills in July 1962, shortly after they both graduated from Oxford. They had four children, three daughters and one son. Her husband was a businessman and a leading Labour Party councillor in Camden. Her brother-in-law, David Mills, was the husband of Baroness Jowell.

== Death ==
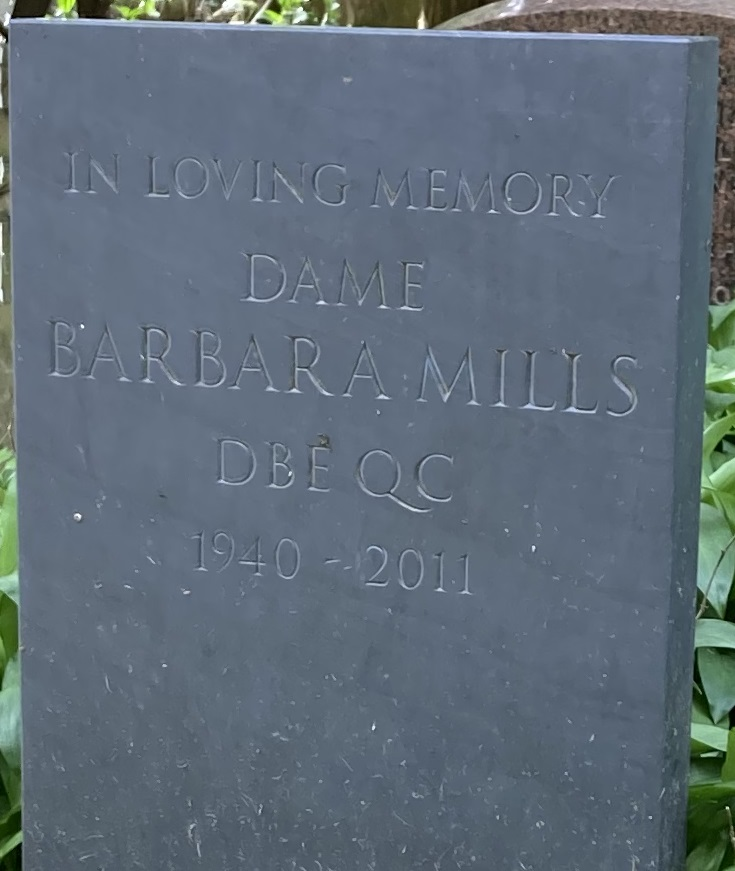
Grave of Barbara Mills in Highgate Cemetery

Dame Barbara Mills died on 28 May 2011, aged 70, after suffering a stroke 12 days earlier. She was survived by her husband, their four children, and eight grandchildren. Her ashes are interred in Highgate Cemetery (west cemetery).

== Sources ==
- Statewatch (September 1992). "Thirteen released" (PDF). Statewatch Bulletin. 2 (5).
- Morton, James (29 May 2011). "Dame Barbara Mills obituary: Barrister and first female director of public prosecutions". Guardian.

Legal offices
Preceded by Sir Allan Green	Director of Public Prosecutions; 1992–1998	Succeeded by Sir David Calvert-Smith
