= Labour for a Referendum =

British political campaign

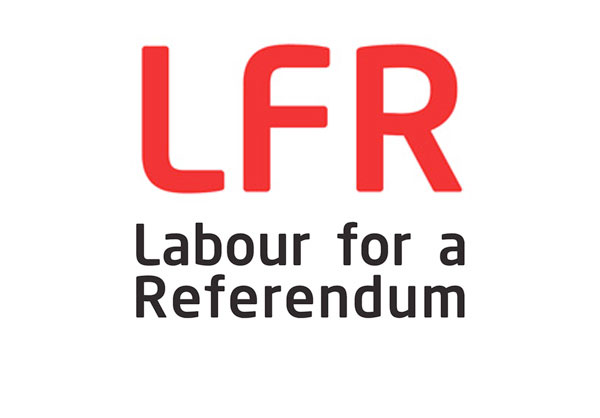
- Formation: 13 May 2013
- Type: Political movement
- Purpose: The holding of a referendum on Britain's continued membership of the European Union
- Location: Westminster
- Region served: United Kingdom
- Key people: John Mills (Chairman); Brendan Chilton (Campaign Director)
- Website: Labour for a Referendum

Labour for a Referendum (LfR) was a political campaign by members of the Labour Party that sought a referendum in the United Kingdom on the European Union. The movement was set up following a pledge by the Conservative Party to hold an in–out vote if re-elected in 2015 United Kingdom general election. In the election campaign, Labour Party policy was that such a referendum would be an unnecessary distraction from government priorities. Following the Conservative victory in that election, the Labour Party committed to supporting passage of a Referendum Bill through Parliament – thus achieving the result sought by this campaign.

The campaign was chaired by JML chairman and Labour party donor John Mills, and directed by Dominic Moffitt, with party support from over 50 councillors, three council leaders and MPs including Kate Hoey, John McDonnell and Keith Vaz, the campaign aimed to move the policy of the Labour Party to one which supports a referendum on membership of the EU, with the intention that this might help to secure a victory in the 2015 general election.

Former Northern Ireland spokesman Jim Dowd MP said: "I have been a supporter of this cause for many years and firmly believe the Labour Party must commit to a referendum before the European elections next year. As the Tories tear themselves apart over this issue, Labour for a Referendum provides the opportunity to unite the party on giving the people a say on our future in the EU."

== Notable supporters ==
After it launched in May 2013, it attracted support from a number of councillors, MPs and party activists.

- Jim Dowd, MP for Lewisham West and Penge and former Northern Ireland spokesman
- Keith Vaz, MP for Leicester East and former Europe minister
- Kate Hoey, MP for Vauxhall
- John Cryer, MP for Leyton and Wanstead
- Rosie Cooper, MP for West Lancashire
- Graham Stringer, MP for Blackley and Broughton
- Austin Mitchell, former MP for Great Grimsby
- Lord Moonie, Member of the House of Lords
- David Drew, former MP for Stroud
- Kevin Meagher, associate editor of Labour Uncut
- Owen Jones, Guardian columnist
- Richard Wilson

== Status following the 2015 general election ==
Following the May 2015 United Kingdom general election, the Labour Party declared that it would support the parliamentary bill for the 2016 United Kingdom European Union membership referendum, achieving the aim of the campaign. As of 13 June 2015, the status of the group was unclear and its web site appeared to be closed.
