= Restoring Control over the Immigration System =

White paper by the British Home Office

- CP 1326
- Created: 12 May 2025
- Location: Palace of Westminster; Online version PDF version
- Author(s): Home Office; Government of the United Kingdom
- Purpose: To outline comprehensive reforms to the UK's immigration system, reduce net migration, and create a "controlled, selective and fair" system linking immigration policy to skills training and integration.

Restoring Control over the Immigration System is a 2025 white paper published by the Starmer ministry on 12 May 2025, outlining comprehensive reforms to UK immigration policy. The 80-page document represents the most sweeping changes to Britain's legal migration framework in over a decade, aimed at significantly reducing net migration and creating what the government describes as a "controlled, selective and fair" immigration system.

The white paper introduces major policy changes across work, study, family and settlement routes, including doubling the qualifying period for citizenship from five to ten years, ending overseas recruitment for care workers, and raising skill requirements for skilled worker visas to graduate level. The reforms are designed to shift away from what Prime Minister Keir Starmer characterised as the previous Conservative government's "one-nation experiment in open borders", which saw net migration rise from 224,000 in 2019 to 906,000 in 2023.

The proposals have generated significant controversy, with Starmer's accompanying speech containing language critics compared to Enoch Powell's 1968 Rivers of Blood speech. Business groups, immigration lawyers and civil society organisations warned the changes could cost employers over £14,000 per sponsored worker and create severe labour shortages in key sectors. The white paper was widely viewed as a response to the rise of Reform UK, which won 30% of the vote in the May 2025 local elections on an anti-immigration platform.

Analysis suggested the controversy had political consequences for Starmer. Research by the New Statesman found that the speech "backfired", showing "a drop in Labour support" with "no modelling scenario where we find the speech has any positive effect". The study found the speech made immigration 3 percentage points more salient and reduced support for all left-of-centre parties by 1.5 percentage points. The apology was described as "another climbdown from Number 10 amid backlash from MPs", with the controversy described as "yet another internal Labour dispute" over Starmer's political positioning on immigration.

== Contents ==
According to analysis by the House of Commons Library, the white paper represents "the most sweeping changes to the UK's legal migration framework in over a decade". Legal experts described the document as proposing changes expected to reduce visa issuance by around 100,000 annually and marking "a profound shift in the trajectory of UK immigration policy" from demand-led migration to "a contribution-based, skills-focused model".

=== Skilled worker visa reforms ===
The white paper proposes significant changes to skilled worker immigration. According to immigration law analysis, the minimum skill level for Skilled Worker visa sponsorship would increase from RQF Level 3 (A-level equivalent) to RQF Level 6 (graduate level), meaning only jobs requiring at least an undergraduate degree would be eligible for sponsorship. This change removes approximately 180 occupations from eligibility and impacts around 111 currently eligible occupations.

Legal commentary noted that the general salary threshold has risen to £38,700, and the Immigration Salary List providing discounts for shortage occupations has been abolished. The Immigration Skills Charge would increase by 32% - the first rise since 2017 - with medium and large employers paying £1,320 per sponsored worker annually.

=== Care worker visa closure ===
Analysis by immigration experts highlighted the complete restriction of overseas recruitment for social care workers, with new overseas applications for adult social care roles under the Health and Care Worker visa no longer being accepted from 22 July 2025. Legal firms noted that existing care workers in the UK may extend or switch visas until 2028, but this remains under review.

=== Settlement requirement changes ===
Immigration lawyers identified proposals to extend the standard qualifying period for permanent residence (indefinite leave to remain) from five years to ten years for Points-Based System routes, including Skilled Worker visas. The white paper proposes an "earned settlement" system with a shorter pathway than ten years for people who have made "Points-Based contributions to the UK economy and society", though legal commentary noted that specific criteria are yet to be determined.

=== Student visa restrictions ===
Education sector analysis highlighted significant changes to student immigration routes. The Graduate Route duration would be reduced from two years to 18 months for international students, with doctoral students continuing to be eligible for a three-year Graduate visa. Legal experts noted that from 2025, only those undertaking PhDs or other advanced research programmes would be permitted to bring dependents to the UK.

Universities UK noted that compliance requirements for universities would be tightened, with sponsoring universities required to maintain an enrolment rate of at least 95% (increased from 90%).

=== English language requirements ===
Legal analysis identified increased English proficiency requirements across visa categories. Skilled Workers would need to meet level B2 English proficiency (up from B1), and all adult dependants would need to demonstrate English at level A1 for initial applications, A2 for extensions, and B2 for settlement.

== "Island of strangers" speech ==
Keir Starmer introduced the white paper with a speech on 12 May 2025 that generated significant controversy due to its language and rhetoric. Media analysis noted that the speech was "widely seen as a reaction to the results of the recent local elections, in which the right-wing party Reform UK won 30% of the vote".

=== Speech content and rhetoric ===
According to media coverage, Starmer opened his remarks by pledging to "take back control of our borders and close the book on a squalid chapter for our politics, our economy, and our country". Media reports noted his deliberate use of "take back control" from the outset, making clear the intended audience and message.

Political commentary highlighted Starmer's criticism of the previous Conservative government, with coverage noting he stated that between 2019 and 2023, "net migration quadrupled" and "reached nearly 1 million" in 2023. Media analysis noted he declared that "Taking back control is a Labour argument".

Most controversially, academic analysis by David Miller, professor of political theory at Nuffield College, Oxford, noted that Starmer warned that "Without [immigration rules], we risk becoming an island of strangers, not a nation that walks forward together".

According to media reports, Starmer described the UK's immigration system as contributing to forces "slowly pulling our country apart" while stating that immigrants "make a massive contribution" to British society. Political analysis noted that he characterised parts of the economy as "almost addicted to importing cheap labour".

=== Criticism and controversy ===
The speech generated intense criticism over its language and rhetoric. Katy Brown of Manchester Metropolitan University noted that Starmer's rhetoric "chimes with classic far-right narratives where migration is framed as the root of all societal ills", and suggested the speech contained elements reminiscent of far-right conspiracies about elites deliberately encouraging mass immigration, with Starmer's words potentially acting as a "dog whistle".

David Miller in the New Statesman described the phrase "island of strangers" as becoming "the locus for a vitriolic exchange of views," reading it not as academic philosophy but as echoing Enoch Powell's Rivers of Blood speech, in which Powell championed those who "found themselves made strangers in their own country".

=== Political and social reactions ===
Civil society groups strongly condemned the language used. Steve Smith, CEO of Care4Calais, called Starmer's language "dangerous," warning that "shameful language like this will only inflame the fire of the far-right and risks further race riots".

Westminster journalists were reported to have grilled Starmer on what they called his "journey" on migration, with critics raising questions about authenticity when he denied changing positions, claiming "core consistency" in his views.

== Reactions ==
=== Political party responses ===
==== Labour Party ====
The speech provoked intense divided reactions within Starmer's Labour Party.

Diane Abbott, the veteran Labour MP, branded the speech "fundamentally racist", stating: "I was very disturbed to hear Keir Starmer on the subject of immigration... I thought that was a fundamentally racist thing to say. I think Keir Starmer is quite wrong to say that the way that you beat Reform is to copy Reform." The MP Nadia Whittome said that the speech "mimics the scaremongering of the far right," describing Starmer's words as "shameful and dangerous".

Sarah Owen, Labour chairwoman of the Women and Equalities Select Committee, argued that the government should focus on "investing in communities to thrive – not pitting people against each other", warning that "chasing the tail of the right" could put the country on "a very dark path". Welsh Labour leader and Welsh First Minister Eluned Morgan stated that she did not want to be "drawn into a debate where people are using divisive language when it comes to immigration."

Other Labour MPs who criticised the speech included Zarah Sultana, who described the speech as "sickening" and tweeted: "The Prime Minister imitating Enoch Powell's 'Rivers of Blood' speech is sickening. That speech fuelled decades of racism and division. Echoing it today is a disgrace. It adds to anti-migrant rhetoric that puts lives at risk. Shame on you, Keir Starmer." She also questioned whether Starmer's speech had actually been written by Nigel Farage, asking: "Did Nigel Farage write this speech? Dehumanising and divisive. We deserve better than this." Former shadow chancellor John McDonnell, who lost the Labour whip, compared the "island of strangers" reference to "the divisive language of Enoch Powell" and questioned in Parliament: "When the prime minister referred to... an island of strangers, reflecting the language of Enoch Powell, does he realise how shockingly divisive that could be?"

The MP Joani Reid stated that "we are not closing the door on immigration that can boost growth and strengthen the economy. But employers who hope to get away with paying low wages or avoid investment in staff training have had 'time' called today".

The then Parliamentary Under-Secretary of State for Migration and Citizenship, Seema Malhotra, stated that Starmer's speech recognised "how much migration has been and remains a vital part of our identity," saying that unless immigration policy changed "we risk being communities that live side by side, rather than work and walk together." The then Home Secretary, Yvette Cooper, stated that Starmer was "right to say we need to change", adding that "I know that everybody always gets caught up in focusing on different phrases and so on, but we do have to be talking about the policies".

==== Conservative Party ====
Shadow Home Secretary Chris Philp dismissed Starmer's stance, stating that "Starmer is the same man who wrote letters protesting against deporting dangerous foreign criminals and has overseen the worst ever start to a year for illegal immigrants crossing the channel." He called the idea that Starmer was tough on immigration "a joke" and labelled the failure to impose a cap on numbers "laughable". Conservative critics more broadly argued that Starmer's measures did not go far enough, accusing Labour of adopting ideas they had championed whilst still lacking credible targets and enforcement. Some highlighted the fact that Labour had previously opposed similar restrictions.

==== Reform UK ====
Nigel Farage criticised the announcement, calling Starmer "a hypocrite who believes in open borders". Reform UK argued these reforms were merely a reaction to their own recent electoral gains and expressed doubt that the government would or could follow through with real results. In Parliament, Farage told Starmer that Reform "very much enjoyed your speech on Monday, you seem to be learning a very great deal from us".

=== Civil society and migrant rights responses ===
Migrant rights organisations and civil society groups strongly condemned both the language and policies outlined in the white paper. Steve Smith, CEO of Care4Calais, a charity that works with migrants and refugees, called Starmer's language "dangerous", stating that "shameful language like this will only inflame the fire of the far-right and risks further race riots that endanger survivors of horrors such as war, torture and modern slavery" and demanded that "Starmer must apologise".

Right to Remain, a prominent migrant advocacy organisation, published a response rejecting Starmer's characterisation of Britain as potentially becoming an "island of strangers". They stated: "What we see is not an island of strangers: we are witnessing a growing community of radical solidarity that is choosing to manifest care, compassion and dignity. We wish Keir Starmer would come and join us." The organisation criticised the scapegoating of migrants, arguing that "successive governments' political decisions" were responsible for worsening the housing crisis and overstretching the public sector, not immigration.

Refugee Action CEO Tim Naor Hilton criticised the rhetoric, writing that "What Keir Starmer's 'Island of Strangers' speech masks is a reality in which successive governments have preferred to treat migrants as strangers and political piñatas rather than neighbours and citizens." One civil society leader warned: "This is not a new tactic — some of the world's darkest moments have been preceded by politicians stoking fear and resentment against immigrants for political gain. We must resist this rhetoric."

=== Business and industry responses ===
Business groups and immigration lawyers raised significant concerns about the economic impact of the proposed changes. Immigration law experts estimated that the proposed reforms could cost employers as much as £14,250 before an applicant could secure permanent residence – a 158% increase on current costs, excluding family members and legal advice fees.

Jonathan Beech, managing director of immigration law firm Migrate UK, argued that the reforms could "decimate" industries such as care and hospitality. He stated that "by closing the care worker visa to new overseas recruits, tens of thousands of care workers will be prevented from coming to the UK (based on current overseas hiring figures), which will have an immediate effect on employers trying to maintain sufficient staffing".

Emma Brooksbank, partner and immigration specialist at Freeths, described the changes as "a disaster for sectors such as care, construction and hospitality who already suffer from chronic labour shortages", adding that it "sends out the wrong message to our international partners, namely that the UK is closed for business". She warned that limiting the immigration system could result in "the closure of education providers, understaffed care homes, house building projects failing to get off the ground and restrictions on growth in key sectors such as AI and tech".

==== NHS and social care sector impact ====
The closure of the care worker visa route particularly affected the NHS and social care sectors. The white paper ended new overseas recruitment for adult social care roles, with care workers and senior care workers no longer able to make new visa applications from 22 July 2025. The Royal College of Nursing noted that this change comes "at a time of widespread vacancies in social care" with "131,000 social care posts currently vacant" and "34,000 unfilled nursing workforce vacancies".

UNISON General Secretary Christina McAnea stated: "The NHS and the care sector would have collapsed long ago without the thousands of workers who've come to the UK from overseas." The union noted that over 220,000 care workers have entered the UK through the care worker visa route since 2020. The Nuffield Trust described the white paper as "a mixed picture for health and social care", noting the tensions between workforce needs and immigration restrictions.

Ross Kennedy, senior client manager at Vanessa Ganguin Immigration Law, warned that the changes would make "one of the world's most expensive immigration systems even more expensive for employers", noting that the Immigration Skills Charge alone would increase from £6,600 over five years to £13,200 over ten years.

=== Academic and policy analysis ===
Policy experts questioned the strategic approach underlying the white paper. The Institute for Government noted that despite the document showing recognition that migration is part of a wider policy landscape, "the document fails to set out how the government intends to manage and adjudicate the trade-offs inherent in migration policy". The think tank argued that "a better approach would be to adopt an annual migration plan to help set out a clear strategy, allowing ministers to weigh up the interests and evidence across government and identify and resolve the trade-offs between migration policy and wider government priorities".

Progressive Britain, a centre-left think tank, argued that much of the reaction focused on "ill-informed hot takes" about the "island of strangers" phrase whilst missing the substantive policy content. They defended Starmer's language, arguing that his underlying sentiment was "a social democratic one with the ties that bind our communities" and represented "a communitarian vision of Britain that works together".

=== International reactions ===
The rhetoric used in Starmer's speech drew attention from international observers. Zoltan Kovacs, state secretary of Hungary's Prime Minister Viktor Orban, commented to The Independent: "We see Sir Keir Starmer saying the exact sentences and words actually we've been talking about for the past 10 years".

=== Enoch Powell comparisons ===
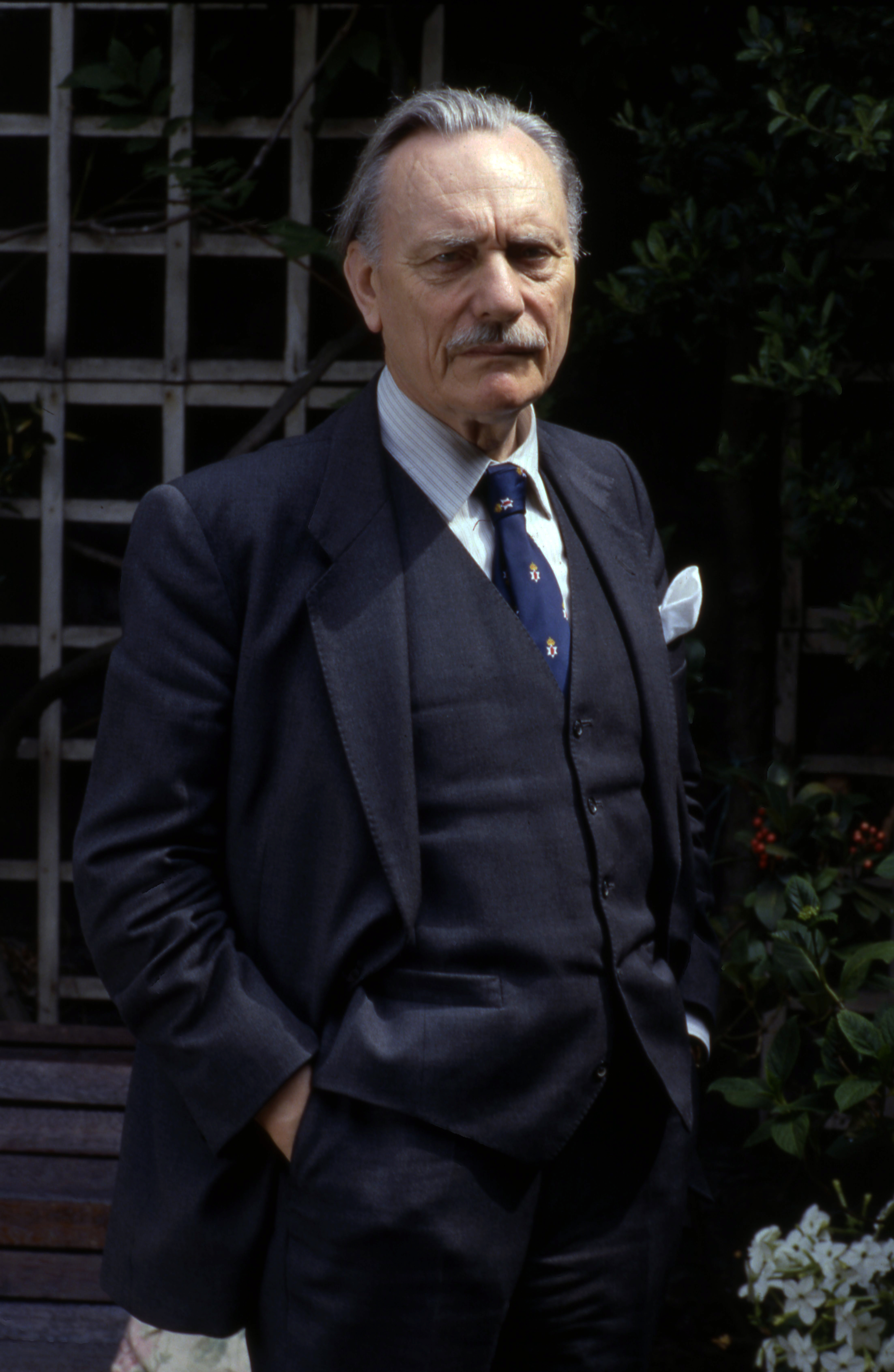
Enoch Powell, whose 1968 speech critics compared to Starmer's immigration remarks

The speech, in particular the phrase "island of strangers", was compared by several commentators to the right-wing politician Enoch Powell's 1968 Rivers of Blood speech. Critics described Powell's speech as "one of the most racist political speeches in British history".

Critics drew direct parallels between the language used in both speeches. In Powell's 1968 address, he stated that white Britons "found themselves made strangers in their own country" as a result of immigration policies, warning of social breakdown and violence. Starmer's phrase "we risk becoming an island of strangers, not a nation that walks forward together" was seen as echoing this sentiment. One analysis noted that "Powell's speech suggests the levels of immigration would outnumber the white population of Britain and cause them to become 'strangers in their own country'" while Starmer warned that without immigration controls, Britain risks "becoming an island of strangers".

The comparison drew criticism from various political figures. Labour MP Zarah Sultana stated: "The Prime Minister imitating Enoch Powell's 'Rivers of Blood' speech is sickening. That speech fuelled decades of racism and division." Former shadow chancellor John McDonnell said Starmer's words "reflected the language of Enoch Powell" and asked in Parliament whether the Prime Minister realised "how shockingly divisive that could be". Owen Jones argued that the speech was "pitched so far to the right that he even aped the infamous, racist 1968 'rivers of blood' speech".

Initially, the Prime Minister's Office rejected comparisons to Powell and defended use of the phrase, saying that Starmer was "using his own words to rightly both recognise the contribution migrants have made over generations and to make the point that uncontrolled migration has been too high". Starmer initially "completely rejected" the suggestion he echoed Powell.

Starmer later expressed regret about the phrase. In an interview with his biographer, he admitted: "I wouldn't have used those words if I had known they were, or even would be interpreted as an echo of Powell. I had no idea – and my speechwriters didn't know either. But that particular phrase – no – it wasn't right. I'll give you the honest truth: I deeply regret using it." Starmer revealed that the speech came shortly after an alleged arson attack on his family home, stating: "It's fair to say I wasn't in the best state to make a big speech... I was really, really worried."

=== Political impact ===
Analysis suggested the controversy had political consequences for Starmer. Research by the New Statesman found that the speech "backfired", showing "a drop in Labour support" with "no modelling scenario where we find the speech has any positive effect". The study found the speech made immigration 3 percentage points more salient and reduced support for all left-of-centre parties by 1.5 percentage points. The apology was described as "another climbdown from Number 10 amid backlash from MPs", with the controversy described as "yet another internal Labour dispute" over Starmer's political positioning on immigration.

== See also ==
- 2024 Keir Starmer speech on migration
- History of UK immigration control
- Modern immigration to the United Kingdom
