= Kira Cochrane =

British journalist

- Born: 1977 (age 48–49); Loughton, Essex, UK
- Occupations: Journalist, Writer
- Employer: The Guardian

Kira Cochrane (/ˈkɒkrən/ KOK-rən; born 1977) is a British journalist and novelist. She is the Head of Features at The Guardian, and worked previously as Head of Opinion. Cochrane is an advocate for women's rights, as well as an active participant in fourth wave feminist movements.

== Early life and education ==
Kira Cochrane was born and raised in Loughton, Essex. Cochrane and her younger brother were raised by her mother in a single parent household. Her father died of a heart attack in 1979 at age 34; Cochrane was two years old. In 1983, when Cochrane was six years old, her elder brother was killed (age 8) in a traffic accident. She attended Christ's Hospital school, Horsham before studying American Literature at the University of Sussex and the University of California, Davis.

== Career in journalism ==
Formerly a journalist at The Sunday Times, Cochrane fills the position as current Head of Features at The Guardian. She was the newspaper's women's editor from 2006 to November 2010, when she was succeeded by Jane Martinson. Cochrane wrote a column for the New Statesman magazine from 2006 to July 2008 and has written occasionally for other news sources such as The Huffington Post.

=== The Guardian ===
Since beginning her career with The Guardian in 2006, Cochrane continues to produce content covering women's empowerment and female leaders in progressivism. In a 2017 interview with The Heroine Collective, Cochrane expresses her passion for writing with The Guardian:

"I always felt it was my duty to run pieces about the more enjoyable sides of women's lives, as well as the everyday sexism and horror," she says. "To try and reflect the reality of our experiences."

== Writing ==
Kira Cochrane has published four novels, Modern Women 52 Pioneers (2017), All The Rebel Women (2013),The Naked Season (2003), and Escape Routes for Beginners (2004), which appeared on the long list for the 2005 Orange Prize for Fiction. In 2009, Cochrane herself appeared on the judging panel for that year's Orange Prize for Fiction. She's co-edited (with Eleanor Mills) Cupcakes and Kalashnikovs: 100 Years of the Best Journalism by Women, published in the United States as Journalistas: 100 Years of the Best Writing and Reporting by Women Journalists. She has also edited an anthology of women's writing, which has appeared in The Guardian, Women of the Revolution: Forty Years of Feminism.

=== The Naked Season (2003) ===
As an emerging author, Cochrane turned feminism into fiction in her first novel, The Naked Season.

=== Escape Routes for Beginners (2004) ===
In her second novel, Kira explores her narrative through the eyes of 13-year-old Rita Mae. Rita questions her parents toxic marriage and wishes to escape the prison-island she resides on. Throughout the novel, Rita uncovers secrets about her family's past. Escape Route for Beginners landed Cochrane as the youngest author nominated for the Orange Prize for Fiction, at 27 years old. Cosmopolitan calls it, "Inventive and deliciously dark."

=== All the Rebel Women (2013) ===
As a supporter of fourth wave feminist movements, Cochrane constructs All the Rebel Women as a tribute to those who are promoting change. In 2013, The Guardian posted an extract of the short novel and summarizes it as such:

"Kira Cochrane's 'All the Rebel Women' collects the voices making up a new fourth wave of feminism. In this exclusive extract, she looks at the role humour has to play in the movement."

=== Modern Women: 52 Pioneers (2017) ===
Modern Women is a tribute to women who have paved the way for women's equality today. Cochrane immortalizes their legacies with visual and textual elements throughout. In the interview with The Heroine Collective, Kira explains her motivations for Modern Women:

"I wanted each woman to be someone who shifted the world's sense of what might be possible for women."

== Fourth-wave feminism ==
Cochrane's All the Rebel Women is solely based on the rise of fourth-wave feminism: the current era of feminism that is heightened by the use of social media and strives for intersectionality in society. The fourth wave focuses on supporting movements such as body positivity and sex-positivity, as well as protecting the rights of the LGBTQ community. Cochrane began her research and reporting of the fourth wave in 2013, upon collecting information for All the Rebel Women. In 2013, Cochrane wrote an article for The Guardian, titled "The fourth wave of feminism: meet the rebel women." Cochrane says:

"Welcome to the fourth wave of feminism. What's happening now feels like something new again. It's defined by technology: tools that are allowing women to build a strong, popular, reactive movement online. Just how popular is sometimes slightly startling."

"As 2013 unfolded, it became impossible to ignore the rumble of feminist campaigners, up and down the country."

"But bald attempts to silence women only made the movement larger and louder. They convinced those who had never thought about misogyny before that it was clearly still alive, and convinced those who were well aware of it to keep going."
