= Hector the Tax Inspector =

Advertising figurehead of the Inland Revenue taxation department

Hector the Inspector, also known as Hector the Taxman, was the name given by a journalist to the unnamed animated advertising figurehead of the British Inland Revenue taxation department, used from 1995 to 2001 to remind people to return their self-assessment tax returns on time.

The Inland Revenue initially suggested the name "Sam - the Self Assessment Man", but this was not used, and he was nicknamed Hector by a journalist.

== History ==
Animated by Snowden Fine Animation (production company for Bob and Margaret), Hector was first used in 1995 as the advertising personality of self-assessment tax returns. and also as a way to put a human face on the Inland Revenue. He was voiced in television adverts by Alec Guinness. It was believed that the usage of Hector helped Inland Revenue to reach their targets due to a rise in awareness of self-assessment tax returns which was attributed to Hector. Hector eventually became so popular that he became associated with the whole Inland Revenue rather than just the self-assessment tax returns campaign.

In 2001, Inland Revenue stopped using Hector in its advertising. The head of Inland Revenue said that the Hector was dropped because he was "too white, too male and too middle aged to represent the Revenue" (and Alec Guinness, Hector's voice, had died the year before). The Public Accounts Committee found the Inland Revenue spent roughly £25 million on him overall, and between 1998 and 2001 the number of people filing beyond deadline actually increased. The official line used to justify Hector's departure was that he was "stuffy" and "stereotypical", but in truth, he was failing in his intended purpose.

Hector was replaced in the Inland Revenue's advertising by Mrs Doyle from Channel 4 sitcom Father Ted.

In 2011, supporters of Scottish association football club, Celtic started to use images and masks of Hector to insult supporters of their Old Firm rivals Rangers by referring to Rangers' tax problems with the Inland Revenue's successor, HM Revenue and Customs.

== Public opinion ==
Merchandise to support Inland Revenue's advertising campaign featuring Hector was produced in large quantities.

However, the character of Hector was not popular with Inland Revenue's staff, some of whom believed that Hector's image was not appropriate for the time.
