= Ken Macdonald =

British lawyer and politician

The Right Honourable The Lord Macdonald of River Glaven KC

Member of the House of Lords
- Lord Temporal
- Life peerage 12 July 2010

Warden of Wadham College, Oxford
- In office 2012–2021
- Preceded by: Neil Chalmers
- Succeeded by: Robert Hannigan

Director of Public Prosecutions
- In office 2003–2008
- Preceded by: David Calvert-Smith
- Succeeded by: Sir Keir Starmer

Personal details
- Born: Kenneth Donald John Macdonald; 4 January 1953 (age 73) Windsor, Berkshire, England
- Spouse: Linda Zuck (m. 1980)
- Children: 3
- Education: St Edmund Hall, Oxford
- Occupation: Barrister academic administrator

Kenneth Donald John Macdonald, Baron Macdonald of River Glaven, KC (born 4 January 1953) is a British lawyer and politician who served as Director of Public Prosecutions (DPP) of England and Wales from 2003 to 2008. In that office he was head of the Crown Prosecution Service. He was previously a recorder (part-time judge) and defence barrister. He is a life peer in the House of Lords, where he sits as a crossbencher and was previously a Liberal Democrat. He was Warden of Wadham College, Oxford until 2021.

== Early life ==
Kenneth Donald John Macdonald was born on 4 January 1953 in Windsor. He was educated at Bishop Wordsworth's School in Salisbury, Wiltshire before studying Philosophy, Politics and Economics at St Edmund Hall, Oxford from 1971 to 1974. During his time at Oxford he was convicted of supplying cannabis after sending 0.1g of the drug through the post. He pleaded guilty, and was fined £75.

== Career ==
=== Barrister ===
Macdonald was called to the Bar by the Inner Temple in July 1978 where he became the first pupil of barrister Helena Kennedy. He was appointed a Queen's Counsel in 1997. As a junior barrister he defended a number of terrorist suspects (both Provisional IRA and those from the Middle East), fraudsters and major drug dealers. He was also on the defence team for the Matrix Churchill trial. In the late 1990s, he was a co-founder of Matrix Chambers (a set of barristers' chambers specialising in human rights cases) with Cherie Booth and Tim Owen. In 2001 he became a recorder (a part-time judge) in the Crown Court.

=== Director of Public Prosecutions ===
In August 2003 it was announced that Macdonald would succeed David Calvert-Smith as Director of Public Prosecutions (DPP) in October of that year. The appointment was immediately denounced by Opposition spokespeople as "rampant cronyism" and a "provocative appointment" due to Macdonald's business relationship with Cherie Booth (wife of then prime minister Tony Blair) and his lack of prosecution experience. Government officials, including both the Attorney General and Solicitor General defended the appointment as it had been made by an independent board consisting of First Civil Service Commissioner Usha Prashar; Hayden Phillips, the Permanent Secretary at the Department for Constitutional Affairs; David Omand, the Cabinet Office Permanent Secretary; and Robin Auld, a Lord Justice of Appeal. A few days after the announcement, the press uncovered details of his earlier conviction, sparking fresh controversy. Fellow lawyer David Pannick wrote in The Times to defend Macdonald's appointment and attack the tabloid campaign against him. Macdonald's predecessor also dismissed the relevance of the drugs offence and a report in The Independent also found support for his appointment from within the legal system.

As DPP, Macdonald established the Counter Terrorism Division, the Organised Crime Division, the Special Crime Division and the Fraud Prosecution Service. In office, he often took positions which were critical of the government. For example, he opposed ministers' rhetoric around the "War on Terror", preferring to see terrorist attacks in the UK as law enforcement issues. He was prominent in criticising government attempts to extend pre-charge detention to 42 days, arguing that due process protections should not be undermined and that the reform was unnecessary. Near the end of his term, leaders in The Guardian and The Times strongly supported his record in office. In his last month in office he warned against excessive use of surveillance powers being introduced by the government, saying: "We should be careful to imagine the world we are creating before we build it. We might end up living with something we cannot bear."

He was awarded a knighthood in the 2007 New Year Honours.

=== Later career ===
Macdonald retired as DPP on 31 October 2008, returning to private practice at Matrix Chambers and becoming a regular contributor to The Times, where he writes on law, security and politics. He was succeeded in the office by future Prime Minister Keir Starmer. In 2009, he was appointed a Visiting Professor of Law at the London School of Economics. In 2010, he became a Deputy High Court Judge and a member of the Advisory Board of the Centre for Criminology at the University of Oxford.

On 14 December 2009, Macdonald wrote an article in The Times about the Chilcot Inquiry into the 2003 Iraq War. This article was more critical than anything that has been said so far by any of the senior civil servants who worked in Whitehall when Blair was prime minister. It attracted media interest also because Macdonald is a member of Matrix Chambers as is Cherie Blair. Macdonald describes Blair's "sycophancy towards power" and wrote that "since those sorry days we have frequently heard [Blair] repeating the self-regarding mantra that 'hand on heart, I only did what I thought was right'. But this is a narcissist's defence, and self-belief is no answer to misjudgment: it is certainly no answer to death."

On 28 May 2010, Downing Street announced that Macdonald would be made a Liberal Democrat life peer in the 2010 Dissolution Honours List, which was gazetted on 15 June. The Letters Patent were gazetted on 15 July, dated 12 July granting him the title of Baron Macdonald of River Glaven, of Cley-next-the-Sea in the County of Norfolk. On 13 July 2010, Theresa May, the Home Secretary, announced to Parliament that she had invited Macdonald to oversee a government review of counter terrorism and security powers, to ensure that legislative measures in place were proportionate and consistent with the rule of law. In October 2010, as part of Turkey's accession negotiations to the European Union, and on the recommendation of the Council of Europe, the European Commission invited Macdonald to lead an EU mission to Turkey to assess that country's commitment to free expression and a free press.

In January 2011, it was announced that Macdonald was to succeed the late Lord Bingham of Cornhill as the chair of Reprieve, the leading international anti-death penalty and prisoners' rights organisation. In April 2011, he joined the Council of the Institute of Contemporary Arts, London. In November 2011, he was elected an honorary fellow of St Edmund Hall, Oxford and from 2012 to 2021 he was Warden of Wadham College, Oxford. In 2015, he became Chair of The Orwell Foundation which awards the Orwell Prize for journalism and political writing. Macdonald publicly criticised the Counter-Terrorism and Security Act 2015 in February 2016, saying it was a threat to freedom of academic expression and research. In 2020, he became President of the Howard League for Penal Reform.

In October 2020, he said that the Covert Human Intelligence Sources (Criminal Conduct) Bill had "gone too far" in protecting Government authorities from prosecution: he called for explicit limits on the crimes covered by the bill, so that it would not permit murder, torture or sexual violence.

== Personal life ==
In 1980, he married Linda Zuck, a television producer for production company Illuminations based in Islington. They have two sons and a daughter, and three granddaughters and one grandson. In 2007 it was reported that Macdonald was having an affair with Kirsty Brimelow, then a junior barrister. Brimelow was unmarried at the time while Macdonald was married to his wife of 27 years.

Preceded by Sir David Calvert-Smith	Director of Public Prosecutions; 2003–2008	Succeeded by Sir Keir Starmer
Preceded by Neil Chalmers	Warden of Wadham College, Oxford; 2012–2021	Succeeded by Robert Hannigan
Orders of precedence in the United Kingdom
Preceded by The Lord Popat	Gentlemen; Baron Macdonald of River Glaven	Followed by The Lord Stevenson of Balmacara
