= David Calvert-Smith =

British jurist (born 1945)

Sir David Calvert-Smith
- Royal coat of arms of the United Kingdom

Justice of the High Court
- In office 11 January 2005 – 30 September 2012
- Monarch: Elizabeth II

Director of Public Prosecutions of England and Wales
- In office January 1998 – September 2003
- Monarch: Elizabeth II
- Preceded by: Dame Barbara Mills
- Succeeded by: Ken Macdonald

Personal details
- Born: David Calvert-Smith; 6 April 1945 (age 81) London, England
- Education: King's College, Cambridge
- Occupation: Jurist

Sir David Calvert-Smith (born 6 April 1945), styled The Hon. Mr Justice Calvert-Smith, is a British retired jurist. He was Director of Public Prosecutions of England and Wales from 1998 to 2003 and then a High Court judge from 2005 to 2012.

== Biography ==
Educated at Eton College and King's College, Cambridge, he was called to the bar at the Middle Temple in 1969 and became a queen's counsel in 1997. He was knighted in 2002 and sat as a High Court judge from 2005 to 2012. Mr Justice Calvert-Smith is an honorary member of QEB Hollis Whiteman.

=== Early career ===
After beginning his career both prosecuting and defending, he specialised in prosecution work from 1986, including several cases of murder, terrorism and organised crime.

=== Directorship of Public Prosecutions ===
In October 1998, he became Director of Public Prosecutions and head of the Crown Prosecution Service, a post he held for five years. During his tenure, the failure of the prosecutions of Paul Burrell and the killers of Damilola Taylor damaged the Service's reputation, and the CPS was described as "institutionally racist" by him and two reports. Notable successes were the prosecutions of serial killer Harold Shipman and former spy David Shayler.

When the Human Rights Act 1998 was passed (most of which came into force in 2000), Calvert-Smith was the first DPP to have to deal with the impact it was expected to have on criminal trials.

In 2002, he opposed proposals to change the law to deem a person found in possession of drugs to be guilty of possession with intent to supply if the quantity exceeded a certain amount. In a letter to Parliament, he wrote: "the best approach is for the jury to focus on weighing the evidence tending to demonstrate intent to supply ... as opposed to this issue being determined with reference to an arbitrary amount". However, the law was changed after he left office, by section 2 of the Drugs Act 2005, which was never commenced and was repealed by the Policing and Crime Act 2009, s 112(2), Sch 8, Pt 13.

Towards the end of his term, he piloted a new system in which CPS lawyers, instead of police officers, would make decisions about charging suspects, resulting in a 15 percent increase in convictions. This policy was fully implemented by his successor.

=== Later career ===
In 2004, he was acting director of the Customs and Excise Prosecutions Office. In 2005, he led an inquiry for the Commission for Racial Equality into how the police forces of England and Wales deal with racism within their ranks. The inquiry reported in March 2005. At a press conference, Calvert-Smith said that "willingness to change at the top is not translating into action lower down, particularly in middle-management where you find the ice in the heart of the Police Service."

On 11 January 2005, Calvert-Smith was appointed as a judge of the High Court.

=== Retirement ===
Calvert-Smith retired from the High Court (Queen's Bench Division) on 30 September 2012.

Legal offices
Preceded by Dame Barbara Mills	Director of Public Prosecutions; 1998–2003	Succeeded by Ken Macdonald
Preceded by Sir David Latham	Chairman of the Parole Board (England & Wales); 2012–present	Succeeded by Incumbent
