= Contributions Agency =

Former executive agency in the UK

Executive agency overview
- Formed: 1991
- Preceding Executive agency: Department of Social Security
- Dissolved: 1999
- Superseding Executive agency: Inland Revenue
- Jurisdiction: United Kingdom
- Headquarters: Benton Park View, Newcastle Upon Tyne
- Parent department: Department of Social Security

The Contributions Agency was an executive agency of the United Kingdom government. It was set up in 1991 to administer National Insurance and was part of the Department of Social Security. It was absorbed into the Inland Revenue in 1999, when it ceased to be an executive agency.

Employing over 9,000 staff, the agency was an early product of the 1988 report "Improving Management in Government: The Next Steps".
