= Plan for Change =

2024 speech by Keir Starmer

"Plan for Change" was a speech given by British Prime Minister Keir Starmer on 5 December 2024, which heralded the launch of a strategic plan with the same name, said to be setting out "milestones for a mission-led government".

== Background ==
The 2024 general election resulted in a landslide victory for the Labour Party led by Keir Starmer. The combined vote share for Labour and the Conservatives reached a record low, with smaller parties doing well. Labour returned to being the largest party in Scotland and remained so in Wales. The election was noted as the most disproportionate in modern British history, mainly as a result of the first-past-the-post voting system. Starmer won a landslide victory at the general election and became prime minister, but with the smallest share of the electoral vote of any majority government since record-keeping of the popular vote began in 1830.

By the end of 2024, opinion polling for the Labour Party and Starmer's personal approval ratings had dropped following several controversies including the freebies controversy involving Waheed Alli, Baron Alli and Taylor Swift, and the farmer protests. Controversy over his support for Israel in the Israel-Hamas war, which began during his tenure as opposition leader and led to Labour losing several seats in the election, continued into his premiership despite Starmer calling for a ceasefire. This culminated in a petition calling for an early general election on the UK Parliament website being started in November 2024 by publican and Conservative voter Michael Westwood, who said he launched it because he believed the Labour government had "gone back on the promises" the party made. Within days, the petition reached over 2 million signatures. Starmer responded to the petition by saying "I'm not surprised, quite frankly, that as we're doing the tough stuff there are plenty of people who say 'well I'm impacted, I don't like it'. But we've got to make the big calls on the NHS and on schools that are really important for the here and now and for the future."

== Summary ==
On 1 December 2024, the Prime Minister's Office announced that Starmer would be giving a major speech setting out the key milestones the government wished to achieve in its "next phase", saying that he would present "the most ambitious yet honest programme for government in a generation". The speech, titled "Plan for Change", was given at midday on 5 December at the Pinewood Studios in Iver Heath, to the west of London. It was 54 minutes long and included a question-and-answer session.

Starmer began the speech by saying that he wished to "show the British people that their country can still do great things" as well as "things they should be able to take for granted" such as "the basic functions of the state". He then said that the contract between the British people and the British state was broken and that it was necessary to "fundamentally reform the way government goes about its business". He accused the civil service of being too comfortable in a "tepid bath of managed decline" saying that too many civil servants had "forgotten, to paraphrase JFK, that you choose change, not because it's easy but because it's hard."

He then said that his government's "Plan for Change" would do two things: doubling-down "on our national missions" and committing "Whitehall to mission-led government". He further set six key milestones that he promised his government would reach by 2029:

- That 92% of routine NHS appointments would occur within 18 weeks of referral,
- That real terms disposable household income would rise,
- That 13,000 new police officers would be on the beat,
- That 1.5 million new homes would be built,
- That the energy grid would be decarbonised by 2030,
- That 75% of children would be school-ready by reception.

The full plan was presented to the UK Parliament later the same day as a command paper.

Starmer also announced that implementation of the reforms aimed for by the speech would be led by Chancellor of the Duchy of Lancaster Pat McFadden and Cabinet Secretary Chris Wormald.

== Analysis ==
Sky News' political editor Beth Rigby stated that "even the most loyal cabinet members would quietly admit it's been a rocky run for Sir Keir Starmer and Labour" in the first five months of Starmer's government and that the speech aimed to give "clear markers on which to measure this government and Whitehall - a sharp navigation tool for a government that has been somewhat buffeted by side winds since taking office."

Several commentators interpreted the speech as emphasising civil service reform. BBC political editor Chris Mason stated that Starmer aimed "to create a story about what they are trying to achieve so when the prime minister and his cabinet ministers are out and about they have stuff to point to about what they are focused on" and that, in Starmer's office, there appeared to be "a growing frustration with the capacity of the government machine to do what they believe needs doing." Kate McCann of the i stated that Starmer's speech would face difficulties in convincing the public given that he "has inherited a country where patience for politicians has already hit rock bottom," suggesting that the speech may have been aimed towards the civil service instead, saying that "the most important thing to take away is: the message to the country may sound samey, but the message to Whitehall could not have been clearer – shape up or we'll force you to."

== Reactions to the speech ==
Katy Balls of the i stated that "no one in government wants to call Keir Starmer's speech a reset moment" and that "it's hard to see this as a lightning bolt moment that will reverse Starmer's falling approval ratings."

The Resolution Foundation criticised Starmer's milestone on disposable household income as "the bare minimum of any functioning government". Domestic violence charity Refuge criticised the speech for failing "to address the horrific epidemic of violence against women and girls and domestic abuse that we are in." Civil service union FDA criticised the speech for its attacks on civil servants, saying that there were many "who are frustrated by a lack of resources, burnt out from constantly working excess hours, tired of chaotic political leadership and sick of being scapegoated for the failures of ministers".

Conservative Party leader Kemi Badenoch criticised the speech, saying "Costly plans for energy decarbonisation watered-down – while poor pensioners lose their winter fuel payments. This relaunch can't hide the reality of a government that doesn't know what it is doing."

Labour Party senior advisor Peter Hyman praised the speech, saying that there was "a culture that is not geared towards innovation" in the civil service, and that "a lot of civil servants are incredibly paranoid about taking any risks because they fear they'll be called in front of a select committee".
