= Jane Martinson =

British academic and journalist (born 1967)

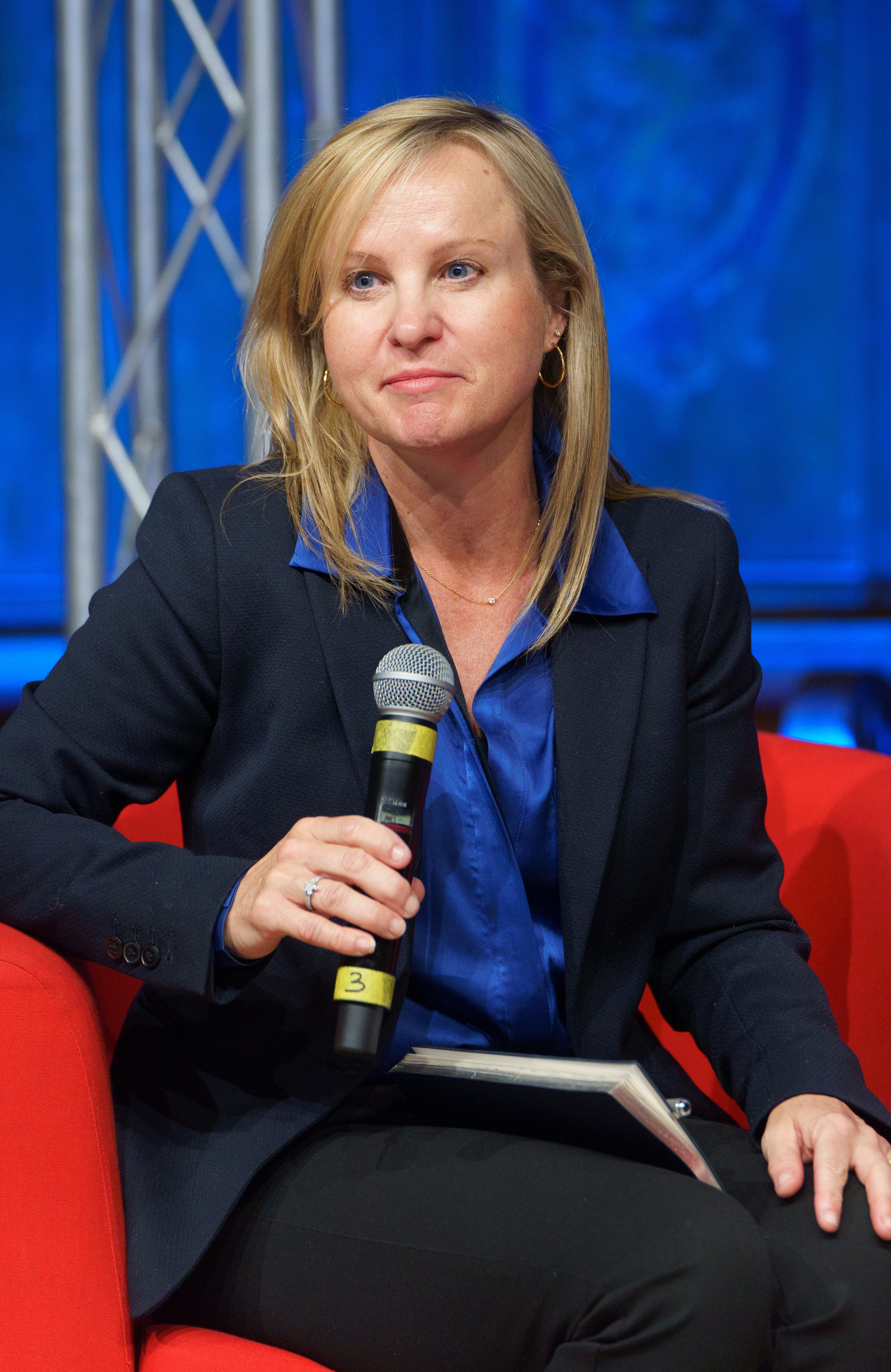
- Martinson at the International Journalism Festival in 2024
- Born: 1967
- Education: University of Cambridge
- Occupations: Academic, Journalist
- Employer(s): City, University of London, Guardian News and Media
- Known for: Marjorie Deane Professor of Financial Journalism, City, University of London, Coverage of the media in The Guardian newspaper

Jane Martinson (born 1967) is a British academic and journalist who is a former Head of Media for Guardian News and Media, responsible for the coverage of the media in The Guardian newspaper and its website. Since April 2018, Martinson has been the Marjorie Deane Professor of Financial Journalism at City, University of London.

== Education and early career ==
Raised on the Isle of Dogs in East London, Martinson attended George Green's Comprehensive and a local sixth-college. Martinson studied English at Christ's College, Cambridge, and studied Journalism at the City University in London before beginning her career on the South Wales Echo. in 1991. She joined the Financial Times in 1993.

== Later career ==
After a period working as the FT's Wall Street correspondent she joined The Guardian in May 1999, and remained in New York as the US business editor. She became the news editor for the City coverage of The Guardian when she returned to London in 2002, and then media business editor in January 2004.

Martinson was appointed as The Guardian's media editor in 2007, and assumed the post in January 2008 after returning from maternity leave. She became women's editor in 2010, and set up the newspaper's blog on women's issues. She a post as Head of Media in September 2014. Martinson left the staff of The Guardian in July 2017, but has continued to write for the paper as a contributor.

In early 2018, Martinson was appointed as the Marjorie Deane Professor of Financial Journalism at City, University of London. Her responsibilities include the MA in Financial Journalism.

== Women in Journalism organisation ==
Martinson is an Executive Committee member of Women in Journalism, and was the organisation's chair until late in 2013. She was succeeded by Eleanor Mills.
