= Eleanor Mills (journalist) =

British journalist (born 1970)

Eleanor Mills (born 1970) is a British journalist, editor, author, speaker and media entrepreneur. She spent 23 years at Times Newspapers and served as the Editorial Director of The Sunday Times and Editor of The Sunday Times Magazine. After leaving in March 2020, she founded Noon.org.uk, an online media platform and community for women in midlife and coined the term 'Queenager' to describe women aged 45 to 70. In 2024 she published Much More to Come, a Times bestseller about midlife, with HarperCollins. She served as Chair of Women in Journalism from 2014 to 2021.

== Early life ==
Born and raised in Camden, north London, Mills is the daughter of the corporate solicitor David Mills from his first marriage. She was educated at St Paul's Girls' and Westminster schools. Mills read English at Brasenose College, Oxford, matriculating in 1989 and graduating in 1992.

== Career ==
After graduating from Oxford, Mills began her career at Tank World magazine, where her boss was British politician and current Prime Minister Andy Burnham. She later trained as a journalist at The Observer.

Mills moved to The Daily Telegraph at 26, becoming the paper’s youngest ever Features Editor. She joined The Sunday Times in 1998, where she worked as an Editor, feature writer, columnist, and interviewer over the following two decades. Her interviews included figures such as Mikhail Gorbachev, David Cameron, Theresa May, and Sheryl Sandberg.

Mills joined The Sunday Times in 1998. She was appointed Editorial Director of The Sunday Times in June 2012. In August 2008 she became editor of the Saturday edition of The Times, replacing George Brock.

Mills was appointed Editor of The Sunday Times Magazine in September 2015, succeeding Sarah Baxter. During her tenure she won Supplement of the Year at the Society of Editors Press Awards. She left both her role as Magazine editor and her position as Editorial Director in March 2020.

=== Women in Journalism ===
Mills co-edited (with Kira Cochrane) Cupcakes and Kalashnikovs: 100 Years of the Best Journalism by Women, published as Journalistas: 100 Years of the Best Writing and Reporting by Women Journalists in the United States. Mills succeeded Jane Martinson as Chair of Women in Journalism, a UK campaigning group, at the end of 2013, taking up the role in 2014. During her seven-year chairship she championed diversity in newsrooms and launched a mentoring scheme that benefited more than 500 young women working in journalism. She left this role in 2021, and was succeeded by Daily Mirror editor Alison Phillips.

In late March 2021, Mills resigned from the board of the Society of Editors in response to the organisation's handling of a statement by its then executive director, who had claimed the British media was not racist. Mills was among those who publicly disputed the statement when it was first issued earlier that month.

=== Noon ===
On 8 March 2021, International Women's Day, Mills launched Noon, an online media platform and community for middle-aged women. In a blog post for the Society of Editors, she wrote that older women are "very much the demographic the mainstream media forgot; one of the last bastions for diversity".

Through Noon, Mills conducted research in partnership with major organisations including HSBC, for a project titled Fearless and Thriving examining midlife female entrepreneurs, and Accenture, for a report titled The Rise of the Queenager examining the economic power of women over 45. The Noon campaign #seeyourselfdifferently, run in partnership with Vision Express, won Digital Campaign of the Year.

In 2025 Noon published research into midlife divorce called Beyond the Break with law firm Mishcon de Reya and private bank Jules Verne

== Bibliography ==
- Mills, Eleanor; Cochrane, Kira, eds. (2005). Cupcakes and Kalashnikovs: 100 Years of the Best Journalism by Women. London: Constable. ISBN 978-1845291655. (US edition: Mills, Eleanor; Cochrane, Kira, eds. (2005). Journalistas: 100 Years of the Best Writing and Reporting by Women Journalists. New York: Carroll & Graf. ISBN 978-0786716678.
- Mills, Eleanor; Cochrane, Kira, eds. (2005). Journalistas: 100 Years of the Best Writing and Reporting by Women Journalists. New York: Carroll & Graf. ISBN 978-0786716678.
- Mills, Eleanor (2024). Much More to Come: Lessons on the Mayhem and Magnificence of Midlife. London: HarperCollins (HQ). ISBN 9780008642563.
