= Migration Advisory Committee =

The Migration Advisory Committee is a non-departmental public body associated with the British Home Office. It was established in 2007.

As of 2026, the interim chair is Dr Madeleine Sumption, who succeeded Brian Bell, professor of economics at King's College London. Alan Manning was a previous chair. Professor Sir David Metcalf was the chair from 2007 to 2016.

It offers independent advice to the government on immigration policy, and particularly on the Shortage Occupation List. When occupations are placed on this list, UK employers have fewer restrictions for recruiting candidates directly from overseas; specifically from outside the EU. They would no longer need to complete a residency test, which involves demonstrating that a search for suitable candidates within the UK in the first instance has been unsuccessful.

They recommended that employers hiring skilled workers from outside the European Union should have to pay £1,000 surcharge per head in January 2016 as an incentive to train more British staff.

The Committee produced a report in 2016 in which they heavily criticised the Department of Health, Health Education England and NHS trusts for not recognising obvious warning signs over a number of years, and "reluctantly" agreed to keep nursing on the list of shortage occupations.

It produced a report on seasonal labour in horticulture after the abolition of the Seasonal Agricultural Workers Scheme.

The changes to the immigration rules in 2012, which affect the settlement of non-European economic area workers with tier II visas earning less than £35,000 were based on the recommendations of the committee.
