= JML (company) =

FMCG and TV Home Shopping Business

John Mills Limited
- Trade name: JML
- Type: Private limited company
- Industry: Retail
- Founded: 1986; 40 years ago
- Founder: John Mills
- Headquarters: London, England
- Key people: Ken Daly (Chief Executive Officer)
- Website: www.jmldirect.com

John Mills Limited (trading as JML) is a consumer products company based in the United Kingdom that markets household and lifestyle products through retail demonstrations and video displays in stores. The company develops and sells products in categories including homewares, health and beauty, DIY and gifts. It sells them through its website, TV channels and retail stores.

In addition to its own products, JML also distributes products by other international direct response television (DRTV) suppliers.

== History ==
John Mills founded JML in the basement of his house in Camden in 1986. Reverting to a model of selling at trade shows, the company expanded into direct-to-consumer selling after a trial involving end-of-aisle video demonstrations in third party-owned retail shops.

JML first established its headquarters in Kentish Town, North London. This was home to one third of the company's workforce, handling product development, marketing, direct-to-consumer marketing, video production, international sales and broadcast operations. In 2016, JML moved its headquarters to Chiswick, West London, as part of its expansion plans.

JML's fulfilment centre is based in the Port of Tyne, comprising a 24/7 call centre, retail sales team, warehouse and distribution facility.

In 2010, it was named as one of Europe's Top 500 Growth Companies.

In June 2019 JML's current CEO, Ken Daly, was elected as Chairman of the Europe Board of Directors for the ERA (Electronic Retailing Association).
