= Home Office =

Ministerial department of the UK Government

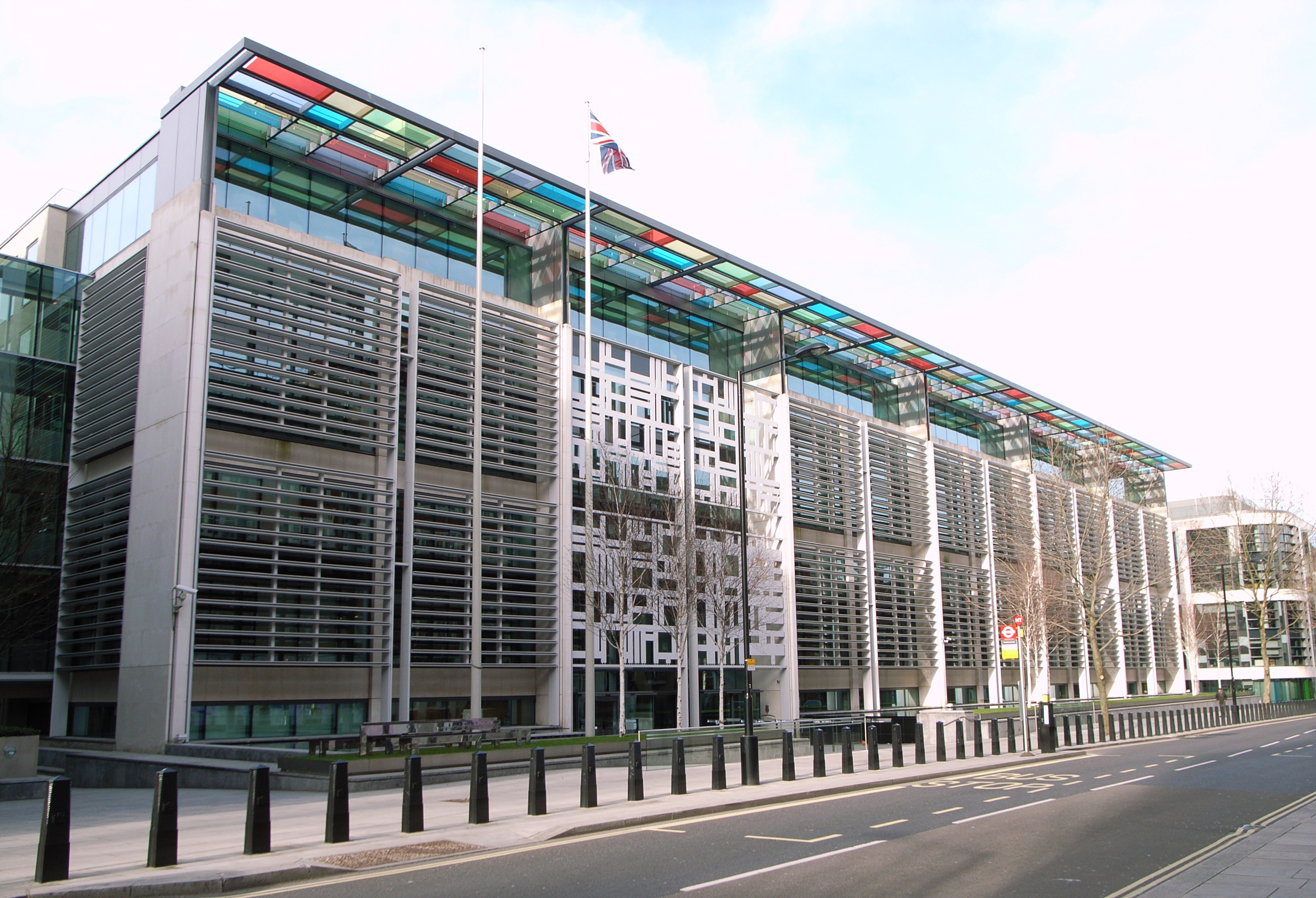
- Headquarters at 2 Marsham Street, Westminster

Department overview
- Formed: 27 March 1782; 244 years ago
- Preceding Department: Southern Department, Northern Department
- Jurisdiction: Government of the United Kingdom
- Headquarters: 2 Marsham Street, London
- Annual budget: £20.3 billion (2022–2023)
- Secretary of State responsible: Shabana Mahmood MP, Home Secretary
- Department executive: Gareth Davies, Permanent Secretary
- Website: gov.uk/home-office

The Home Office, formally the Home Department, is the United Kingdom's interior ministry. It is responsible for national security, public safety, immigration, passports, and civil registration, as well as policing and criminal justice in England and Wales, but not Scotland or Northern Ireland where it is devolved.

The department oversees key areas of domestic policy in England and Wales, including policing, drugs policy, counterterrorism, border security, and immigration. Bodies operating within or alongside the Home Office system include Border Force, UK Visas and Immigration, and the Security Service (MI5). It was formerly responsible for His Majesty's Prison Service and the National Probation Service, both of which were transferred to the Ministry of Justice.

The department is headed by the home secretary, one of the Great Offices of State. The office has been held by Shabana Mahmood since 5 September 2025, and the department is managed on a day-to-day basis by its permanent secretary.

The Home Office's expenditure, administration, and policy are scrutinised by the Home Affairs Select Committee.

== History ==
The Home Office was established on 27 March 1782 following the reorganisation of the Southern Department, with domestic responsibilities transferred to the new department and foreign affairs assigned to the Foreign Office. From its creation, the Home Office was responsible for a wide range of internal matters, including law and order, royal prerogative functions, and aspects of colonial administration.

During the 19th and early 20th centuries, many of the Home Office's functions were gradually transferred to newly created government departments as the scope of the state expanded. Responsibilities relating to health, local government, labour, and agriculture were moved to specialised departments, while the Home Office retained core functions relating to policing, internal security, and immigration.

In 1829, the Home Office oversaw the creation of the Metropolitan Police Service, marking a major development in the organisation of policing in England and Wales. The department also took on responsibilities for prisons, civil registration, and the regulation of explosives and firearms during this period.

Further restructuring took place throughout the 20th century, with responsibilities for areas such as aviation, broadcasting, and local government transferred to other departments. In 2007, significant criminal justice functions, including prisons, probation, and legal affairs, were transferred to the newly created Ministry of Justice.

In the 21st century, the Home Office has focused primarily on policing, border security, immigration, and national security. Responsibilities have continued to evolve, including the transfer of fire and rescue services into and subsequently out of the department, and the expansion of its role in counter-terrorism policy.

== Responsibilities ==
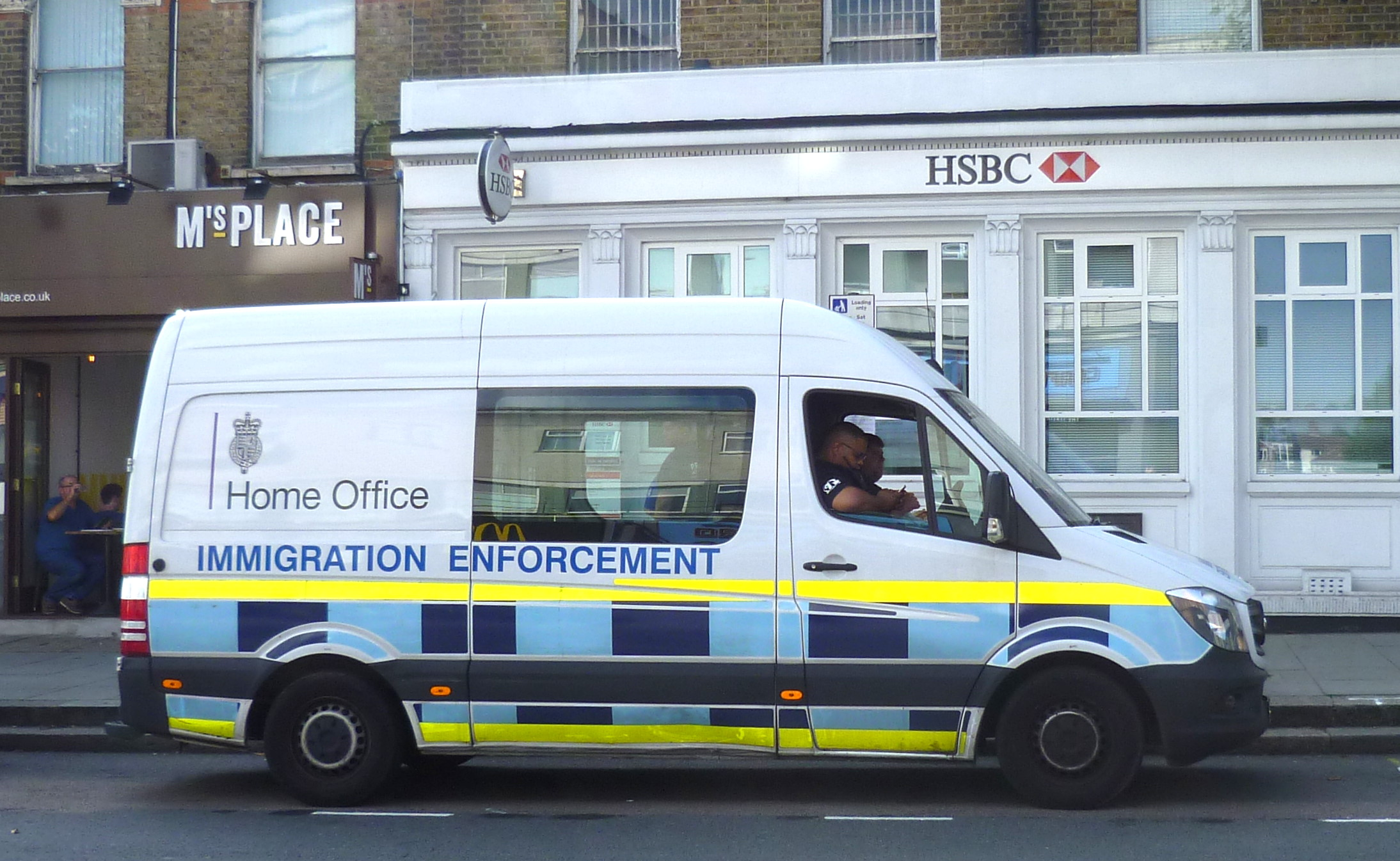
A Home Office Immigration Enforcement vehicle in north London

The Home Office is responsible for domestic policy in England and Wales in areas including policing, public safety, immigration and border control. It also oversees passports, civil registration, and policy relating to counter-terrorism, serious and organised crime, and drugs.

Current responsibilities include:

- policing and crime reduction
- border security and immigration control
- visas, asylum and citizenship
- passports and civil registration
- counter-terrorism and national security policy
- serious and organised crime
- drugs policy
- safeguarding and related public protection policy

== Organisation ==
The Home Office is headed by the home secretary, a Cabinet minister, supported by the department's senior civil servant, the permanent secretary.

The Home Office comprises eleven directorates and is supported by a number of agencies and public bodies, along with independent statutory officeholders who provide oversight of its functions.

=== Public bodies ===
Entity	Type	Formed
Adjudicator's Office	Public Body	1896
Advisory Council on the Misuse of Drugs	Public Body	1971
Animals in Science Committee	Public Body	2013
Science and Technology Ethics Advisory Committee	Public Body	2017
Biometrics and Surveillance Camera Commissioner	Public Body	2012
Border Force	Agency	2012
Border Security Command	Agency	2024
College of Policing	Public Body	2012
Commission for Countering Extremism	Public Body	2018
Disclosure and Barring Service	Public Body	2012
Forensic Science Regulator	Public Body	2008
Gangmasters and Labour Abuse Authority	Public Body	2005
HM Passport Office	Agency	2006
His Majesty's Inspectorate of Constabulary and Fire & Rescue Services	Public Body	1856
Immigration Enforcement	Agency	2012
Independent Family Returns Panel	Public Body	2011
Independent Office for Police Conduct	Public Body	2018
Investigatory Powers Commissioner's Office	Public Body	2016
Investigatory Powers Tribunal	Public Body	2000
Migration Advisory Committee	Public Body	2007
Security Service	Non-Ministerial	1909
National Counter Terrorism Security Office	Public Body	2007
National Crime Agency Remuneration Review Body	Public Body	2013
Office of the Immigration Services Commissioner	Public Body	1999
Police Advisory Board for England and Wales	Public Body	1978
Police Discipline Appeals Tribunal	Public Body	2012
Police Remuneration Review Body	Public Body	2014
Security Industry Authority	Public Body	2003
Technical Advisory Board	Public Body	2000
UK Visas and Immigration	Agency	2013

=== Independent officeholders ===
- Independent Chief Inspector of Borders and Immigration
- Independent Anti-Slavery Commissioner
- Independent Reviewer of Terrorism Legislation

== Budget and spending ==
In the financial year 2022–2023, the Home Office had a total budget of £20.3 billion.

Spending by financial year
Directorate	2022–2023	
Directorate	Resource (£millions)	Capital (£millions)
Delivery	77.8	3.0
STARS (Science, Technology, Analysis, Research and Strategy)	34.6	43.0
Homeland Security Group	1,125.1	157.8
Public Safety Group	11,204.4	225.4
Migration & Borders	228.0	172.2
Customer Service (UKVI & HMPO)	-3,166.3	87.4
Asylum & Protection	4,498.8	6.9
Borders & Enforcement	1,404.8	135.4
Corporate Enablers	945.6	37.9
Digital Data & Technology	473.0	40.0
Legal	11.1	-
Communications	8.6	-
Arm's Length Bodies	99.9	16.4
Total	17,005.3	925.4

== Ministers ==
The Home Office ministers are as follows, with cabinet ministers in bold.

Minister	Portrait	Office	Portfolio
**Shabana Mahmood** MP		Secretary of State for the Home Department	Overall responsibility for all Home Office business, including: overarching responsibility for the departmental portfolio and oversight of the ministerial team; cabinet; National Security Council (NSC); public appointments; oversight of the Security Service
Dan Jarvis MP		Minister of State for Security	counter terrorism and extremism; state threats; cyber security and crime; serious and organised crime; oversight of the National Crime Agency; international criminality; aviation and maritime security; economic crime (excluding fraud); extradition; exclusions and deprivations; MP security and VIP protection; online safety; anti-corruption. Jointly with Cabinet Office.
David Hanson, Baron Hanson of Flint		Minister of State for the Home Office	Home Office business in Lords (except migration and borders); fraud and economic crime; anti-corruption; departmental finance; contract management (including asylum accommodation contracts); corporate and delivery; overseas territories; digital and technology (including AI); data and identity; analysis, science and research; animals in Science; public appointments and sponsorship; inquiries; the union and devolution; Home Office interests in free trade agreements
Sarah Jones MP		Minister of State for Policing and Crime	police accountability and system reform – professional standards, performance, culture; police resourcing and efficiency – neighbourhood policing guarantee, savings, funding; public order, major events, civil contingencies; Emergency Services Mobile Communication Programme; criminal justice system; Early intervention and Young Futures; crime prevention: safer streets, including drugs and county lines, alcohol and licensing, anti-social behaviour, neighbourhood crime, firearms, child criminal exploitation and hate crime.
Anna Turley MP		Minister of State for Border Security and Asylum	Border Security Command: reducing small boat arrivals and organised immigration crime; reducing the asylum caseload, exiting hotels and reducing the supported population; Immigration Enforcement: Increasing returns (including FNOs), immigration detention estate expansion, illegal working; asylum, illegal migration and returns policy, safe and legal policy and refugee resettlement policy; reducing net migration: legal migration policy; tackling visa abuse; innovative solutions; Immigration White Paper implementation; European Entry and Exit System; modern slavery policy as it relates to immigration status
Satvir Kaur MP		Parliamentary Under-Secretary of State for Safeguarding and Violence Against Women and Girls	Safeguarding; rape and serious sexual offences; violent crime and domestic abuse; child sexual abuse and exploitation; violence against women and girls (VAWG); victims; wider modern slavery policy including the national referral mechanism, support and stakeholder engagement; spiking; oversight of Disclosure and Barring Service (DBS)
Ray Collins, Baron Collins of Highbury		Parliamentary Under-Secretary of State	Equalities Minister in the Lords; Lords Minister for Conversion Practices Bill and LGBT+ policy; Special Envoy on LGBT+ rights; Lead for UK’s hosting of the 2027 International Day Against Homophobia, Biphobia and Transphobia Forum (IDAHOT+); migration and borders business in the Lords; other matters delegated by Home Secretary and Lords Minister of State
Jo White MP		Parliamentary Under-Secretary of State for Migration and Citizenship	Immigration Rules; nationality and citizenship policy and operations; economic migration; Windrush; goods; UK Visas and Immigration; HM Passport Office; General Registrar Office; ICIBI; EU Settlement Scheme; Border Force operations; existing safe routes schemes Ukraine schemes, Afghan schemes, Hong Kong BNO, Gaza; European Entry / Exit System; earned settlement reform; Future Borders and Immigration System; Visit Visa policy and tackling visa abuse; youth mobility and free trade agreements

== Research ==
To meet the UK's five-year science and technology strategy, the Home Office sponsors research in police sciences, including:

- Biometrics – including face and voice recognition
- Cell type analysis – to determine the origin of cells (e.g. hair, skin)
- Chemistry – new techniques to recover latent fingerprints
- DNA – identifying offender characteristics from DNA
- Improved profiling – of illicit drugs to help identify their source
- Raman Spectroscopy – to provide more sensitive drugs and explosives detectors (e.g. roadside drug detection)
- Terahertz imaging methods and technologies – e.g. image analysis and new cameras, to detect crime, enhance images and support anti-terrorism

== Devolution ==
Most front-line law and order policy areas, such as policing and criminal justice, are devolved in Scotland and Northern Ireland, and only very partially devolved in Wales. However, a number of reserved and excepted matters remain the responsibility of Westminster, including the following:

- Drug classification and the Misuse of Drugs Act 1971
- Extradition
- Most aspects of firearms legislation
- Immigration and nationality
- Scientific procedures on live animals
- Data protection and access to information
- Elections
- Film classification
- National security and counter-terrorism
- Emergency Powers
- Lieutenancies
- Charities
- Parades (Northern Ireland)
- Security of explosives (Northern Ireland)
- National Crime Agency (Northern Ireland)

In Scotland, the Scottish Government's Justice and Safer Communities Directorates are responsible for devolved justice and home affairs policy, although Scottish Ministers retain some executive responsibilities in areas such as extradition operations, mutual legal assistance, and firearms licensing.

In Northern Ireland, policing and justice are largely devolved to the Department of Justice, while national security remains the responsibility of the Northern Ireland Office.

== Criticism ==
=== Windrush scandal ===
The Windrush scandal resulted in some British nationals being wrongly deported, along with a further compensation scheme for those affected, and a wider debate on the Home Office hostile environment policy.

The first allegations about the targeting of pre-1973 Caribbean migrants started in 2013. In 2018, the allegations were put to the Home Secretary in the House of Commons, and resulted in the resignation of the then-Home Secretary. In 2019, the Home Office admitted to multiple breaches of data protection regulations in the handling of its Windrush compensation scheme. The department sent emails to Windrush migrants which revealed the email address of other Windrush migrants to whom the email was sent. The data breach concerned five different emails, each of which was sent to 100 recipients. In April 2019, the Home Office admitted to revealing 240 personal email addresses of EU citizens applying for settled status in the UK. The email addresses of applicants were incorrectly sent to other applicants to the scheme. In response to these incidents, the Home Office pledged to launch an independent review of its data protection compliance.

In 2019, the Court of Appeal issued a judgement which criticised the Home Office's handling of immigration cases. The judges stated that the "general approach [by the home secretary, Sajid Javid] in all earnings discrepancy cases [has been] legally flawed". The judgement relates to the Home Office's interpretation of Section 322(5) of the Immigration Rules.

In November 2020, the Equality and Human Rights Commission, a statutory body that investigates breaches of the Equality Act 2010 published a report concluding that the Home Office had a "lack of organisation-wide commitment, including by senior leadership, to the importance of equality and the Home Office's obligations under the equality duty placed on government departments". The report noted that the Home Office's pursuit of the "hostile environment" policy from 2012 onwards "accelerated the impact of decades of complex policy and practice based on a history of white and black immigrants being treated differently". Caroline Waters, the interim chair of the EHRC, described the treatment of Windrush immigrants by the Home Office as a "shameful stain on British history".

=== Aderonke Apata ===
Aderonke Apata, a Nigerian LGBT activist, made two asylum claims that were both rejected by the Home Office in 2014 and on 1 April 2015 respectively, due to her previously having been in a relationship with a man and having children with the same man. In 2014, Apata said that she would send an explicit video of herself to the Home Office to prove her sexuality. This resulted in her asylum bid gaining widespread support, with multiple petitions created in response, which gained hundreds of thousands of signatures combined. On 8 August 2017, after a thirteen-year legal battle and after a new appeal from Apata was scheduled for late-July, she was granted refugee status in the United Kingdom by the Home Office.

=== Use of the Bible for rejecting asylum claims ===
In March 2019, it was reported that in two unrelated cases, the Home Office denied asylum to converted Christians by misrepresenting certain Bible quotes. In one case, it quoted selected excerpts from the Bible to imply that Christianity is not more peaceful than Islam, the asylum-seeker's original religion. In another incident, an Iranian Christian application for asylum was rejected because her faith was judged as "half-hearted", for she did not believe that Jesus could protect her from the Iranian regime. As criticism grew on social media, the Home Office distanced itself from the decision, though it confirmed the letter was authentic. Home Secretary Sajid Javid said that it was "totally unacceptable" for his department to quote the Bible to question an Iranian Christian convert's asylum application, and ordered an urgent investigation into what had happened.

The treatment of Christian asylum-seekers chimes with other incidents in the past, such as the refusal to grant visas to the Archbishop of Mosul to attend the consecration of the UK's first Syriac Orthodox Cathedral. In a 2017 study, the Christian Barnabas Fund found that only 0.2% of all Syrian refugees accepted by the UK were Christians, although Christians accounted for approximately 10% of Syria's pre-war population.

=== Proscription of Palestine Action under the Terrorism Act 2000 ===
In 2025, the Home Office proscribed the group Palestine Action under the Terrorism Act 2000, placing it in the same legal category as organisations such as al-Qaeda and Islamic State. The decision was made following organised protests by Palestine Action, including a high-profile breach at RAF Brize Norton in which activists entered the base and damaged military aircraft, prompting a wider security review by the UK Government. Reports at the time also stated that officials were examining possible links to Iranian support, including the Islamic Revolutionary Guard Corps (IRGC), which Palestine Action denied. Following the proscription, it became a criminal offence to belong to or express support for the group, and, according to The Guardian and the BBC, "thousands" of activists were arrested by police under the new measures, although an exact figure was not publicly specified.

In February 2026, the High Court ruled that the proscription by the Home Office had been "unlawful" and "disproportionate", and the government subsequently indicated that it would appeal the decision on national security grounds, with the ban remaining in force pending the outcome of that appeal.

== See also ==
- Home Office Large Major Enquiry System 2 (HOLMES 2)
- Law enforcement in the United Kingdom
- Home Secretary
- Ministry of Home Security
- Parliamentary Under-Secretary of State for the Home Department
- Permanent Under-Secretary of State of the Home Office
- UK Immigration Service
