= Inland Revenue =

UK tax collection entity (1849–2005)

- Final logo

Non-ministerial government department overview
- Formed: 1849
- Preceding agencies: Board of Stamps and Taxes; Board of Excise; Contributions Agency
- Dissolved: 18 April 2005
- Superseding Non-ministerial government department: HM Revenue & Customs
- Jurisdiction: United Kingdom
- Headquarters: Somerset House London, WC2

The Inland Revenue was, until April 2005, a department of the British Government responsible for the collection of direct taxation, including income tax, national insurance contributions, capital gains tax, inheritance tax, corporation tax, petroleum revenue tax and stamp duty. More recently, the Inland Revenue also administered the Tax Credits schemes, whereby monies, such as Working Tax Credit (WTC) and Child Tax Credit (CTC), are paid by the government into a recipient's bank account or as part of their wages. The Inland Revenue was also responsible for the payment of child benefit (from 1999).

The Inland Revenue was merged with HM Customs and Excise to form HM Revenue and Customs which came into existence on 18 April 2005. The current name was promoted by the use of the expression "from Revenue and Customs" in a series of annual radio, and to a lesser extent, television public information broadcasts in the 2000s and 2010s.

== History ==
=== The Board of Taxes ===
The beginnings of the Inland Revenue date from 1665, when a Board of Taxes (formally the Board of Commissioners for the Affairs of Taxes) was set up following the introduction of special taxes to pay for the Second Anglo-Dutch War. A central organisation to supervise the collection of the special taxes was required; it became known as the Tax Office.

Taxes administered by the Board of Taxes included the Land Tax, first levied in 1692, along with the window tax and house tax, both of which dated from 1696. In 1785 a number of other miscellaneous taxes, administered by the Stamp Office and the Excise Office, were transferred to the Tax Office; these included taxes on carriages (dating from 1747), on wagons and carts, on male servants (1777) and on horses (1784). Together with the House Tax and the Window Tax, they came to be known as the 'assessed taxes' and were intended as a progressive form of taxation on the wealthy.

Income tax was introduced in various forms in 1797, 1799, 1803 to 1816, and then reintroduced in 1842 as an annual tax which is formally renewed in each year's Finance Act.

=== The Board of Stamps ===
A separate Board of Stamps (the Board of Commissioners of Stamps) was created by the Stamps Act 1694. During the 18th and early 19th centuries at various times (as financial strains on the economy demanded, and Parliament allowed) stamp duties were extended above a certain threshold of sale value to cover newspapers, pamphlets, lottery tickets, apprentices' indentures, advertisements, playing cards, dice, hats, gloves, patent medicines, perfumes, insurance policies, gold and silver plate and armorial bearings (coats of arms). One further category is the most widely cited example of an unpopular and most difficult to enforce tax, the Duty on Hair Powder Act 1795. The last stamp taxes to remain are stamp duty land tax and stamp duty reserve tax; however the use of physical stamps has ceased.

=== The Board of Stamps and Taxes ===
In June 1833, following a steady reduction in the number of different taxes and duties being levied, a single body of commissioners was set up to merge the revenues of stamps and taxes. The Board of Taxes and the Board of Stamps were formally combined under the Land Tax Act 1834 to form the Board of Stamps and Taxes (formally the Board of Commissioners of Stamps and Taxes).

=== The Board of Inland Revenue ===
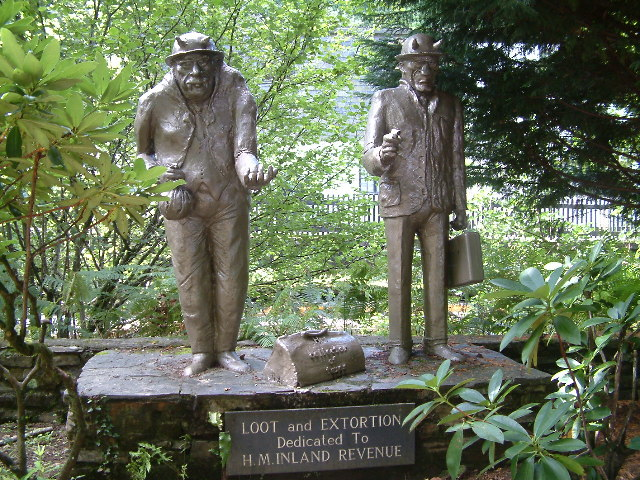
LOOT and EXTORTION Dedicated To H.M. Inland Revenue, statues at Trago Mills (near Liskeard, Cornwall), poking fun at the Inland Revenue.

The Board of Inland Revenue was created under the Inland Revenue Board Act 1849, after the Board of Excise and the Board of Stamps and Taxes were amalgamated. Responsibility for excise duties was transferred to the Board of Customs and Excise in 1909.

In 1995, to help promote self-assessment tax returns, Inland Revenue created the character of Hector the Tax Inspector to help in their advertising campaign.

=== HM Revenue and Customs ===
The 2004 Budget included proposals to merge HM Customs and Excise with the Board of Inland Revenue to form a new department, HM Revenue and Customs (HMRC). The merger was implemented by the Commissioners for Revenue and Customs Act 2005 with effect from 18 April 2005.

== List of taxes ==
The following taxes were administered at various times either by the Inland Revenue or by its predecessors (excise duties are not included):

- Land Tax (1692-1963)
- Stamp Duty (1694 onwards)
- Window tax (1696-1851)
- Inhabited House Duty (1778-1834, 1851-1924)
- Legacy Duty (1780-1949)
- Assessed taxes (1785):
  - Coaches and carriages tax (1746-1798) (administered by the Excise Office until 1785)
  - Male servants tax (1777-1852) (administered by the Excise Office until 1785)
  - Waggons, wains and carts tax (1783-1792) (administered by the Stamp Office until 1785)
  - Saddle and Carriage Horse tax (1784-1875) (administered by the Stamp Office until 1785; converted to excise licence duty in 1869)
  - Racehorse tax (1784-1875) (administered by the Excise Office until 1785; converted to excise duty in 1856)
  - Game tax (1784-2007) (Stamp duty until 1808; converted to excise licence in 1860)
  - Female servants tax (1785-1792)
  - Shop tax (1785-1789)
  - Hair Powder tax (1795-1869) (classed as licence duty until 1802) (there was also a Stamp Duty levied on hair powder from 1786-1800)
  - Dog tax (1796-1988) (converted to excise licence duty in 1867)
  - Clocks and watches tax (1797-1798)
  - Armorial Bearings tax (1798-1944) (converted to excise licence duty in 1869)
- Income Tax (1799-1802, 1803-1816, 1842 onwards)
- Succession Duty (1853-1949)
- Corporation Duty (1885-1959)
- Estate Duty (1894-1974)
- Super Tax (1909-1973)
- Excess Profits Duty (1915-1921)
- Profits Tax (1937-1966)
- Excess Profits Tax (1939-1946)
- Capital Gains Tax (1965 onwards)
- Corporation tax (1966 onwards)
- Capital Transfer Tax (later called Inheritance Tax) (1974 onwards)
- Petroleum Revenue Tax (1975 onwards)

The Inland Revenue also received National Insurance contributions and administered child benefit payments and Tax Credits.

== Notable staff ==
=== Ministerial leadership ===
The leadership and taking of the highest level of decisions is ministerial as the concept of any particular tax and the degree of success in collecting any particular tax rests ultimately with the political decisions taken. Of particular relevance are the debates in Parliament in their imposition.

=== Civil servants ===
The Permanent Secretary to the Treasury has the main advisory, policy informative role to play in the enabling of the department's functions, in liaison with board chairman who bore overall responsibility along with the rest of the board for the operational carrying out of the Inland Revenue's functions.

As sub-departments (typically, Offices, Boards and Bureaus) have issued their own taxes or expanded their remit, they too have seen Comptrollers General and Chairmen. An example was Robert Wilkie Stanton, Comptroller of Stamps and Taxes (Scotland), Board of Inland Revenue.

== STEPS contract ==
In 2001, the Inland Revenue entered into a Private Finance Initiative within the framework of the STEPS-contract (Strategic Transfer of the Estate to the Private Sector) whereby it sold two-thirds of its estate to Mapeley for £370 million and then leased the properties back.

== See also ==
- HM Revenue and Customs - formed by the 2005 merger of the Inland Revenue and Customs and Excise
- Minister of Inland Revenue
