= Legal career of Keir Starmer =

From 1987 to 2013

Sir Keir Starmer KCB KC
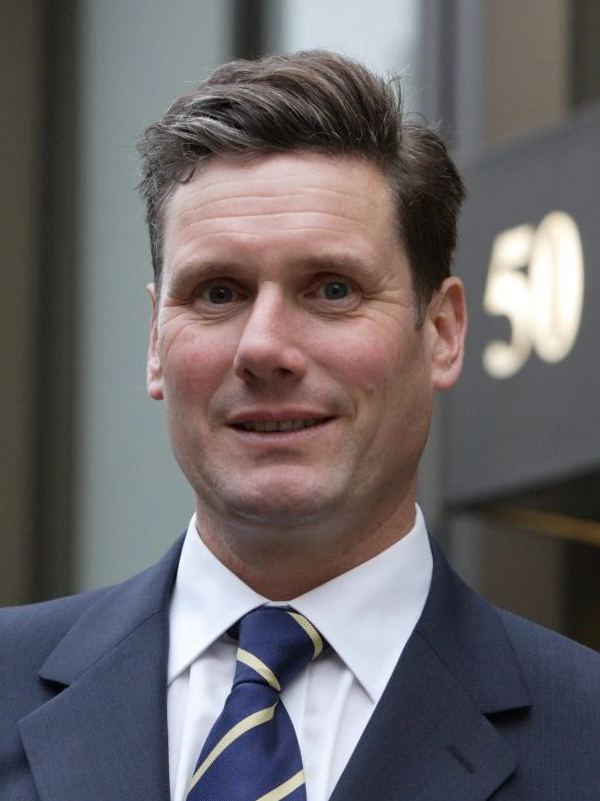
- Official portrait as Director of Public Prosecutions, 2009

Director of Public Prosecutions
- In office 1 November 2008 - 1 November 2013
- Appointed by: Patricia Scotland
- Preceded by: Sir Ken Macdonald
- Succeeded by: Alison Saunders

Personal details
- Education: Reigate Grammar School
- Alma mater: University of Leeds (LLB) * University of Oxford (BCL)
- Website: keirstarmer.com

Keir Starmer, the prime minister of the United Kingdom from 2024 to 2026 and Leader of the Labour Party from 2020 to 2026, practised law before his political career began in 2015. After becoming a barrister in 1987, he mostly dealt with criminal defence work on human rights matters. In 2008, he became Director of Public Prosecutions (DPP) and head of the Crown Prosecution Service (CPS), holding these positions until 2013.

== Barrister ==
Starmer graduated with a Bachelor of Laws degree from the University of Leeds in 1985 and gained a postgraduate Bachelor of Civil Law degree at St Edmund Hall at the University of Oxford in 1986. He became a barrister in 1987 at the Middle Temple, becoming a bencher there in 2009. Starmer served as a legal officer for the campaign group Liberty until 1990. He was a member of Doughty Street Chambers from 1990 onwards, primarily working on human rights issues. While at Doughty Street Chambers, he met the solicitor Victoria Alexander, who he later married.

In the early 1990s, Starmer represented and worked on behalf of the National Union of Mineworkers on pro bono terms, and dedicated his fee to the campaign.

Starmer was called to the bar in several Caribbean countries, where he has defended convicts sentenced to the death penalty. He assisted the activists Helen Steel and David Morris in the McLibel case, a legal case in which Steel and Morris were sued by McDonald's for libel over a critical pamphlet. Starmer represented Steel and Morris in the trial and appeal in English courts, also representing them at the European Court of Human Rights.

Starmer was appointed Queen's Counsel on 9 April 2002, aged 39. In the same year, he became joint head of Doughty Street Chambers. Starmer served as a human rights adviser to the Northern Ireland Policing Board and the Association of Chief Police Officers, and was also a member of the Foreign, Commonwealth and Development Office's death penalty advisory panel from 2002 to 2008. During this time he also authored legal opinions against the Iraq War. Starmer stated in 2015 that he believed that the Iraq War was "not lawful under international law because there was no UN resolution expressly authorising it." In 2007, he was named "QC of the Year" by Chambers and Partners.

== Director of Public Prosecutions ==
=== Appointment ===
In July 2008, Patricia Scotland, Attorney General for England and Wales, named Starmer as the new head of the Crown Prosecution Service (CPS) and Director of Public Prosecutions. He took over from Ken Macdonald on 1 November 2008.

=== Tenure ===
Starmer attending the National Black Crown Prosecutors Association 2009 Conference

In 2009, Starmer upheld the decision not to prosecute the police officers who had killed Jean Charles de Menezes, a Brazilian man who was wrongfully identified as one of the fugitives from the failed bombing attempts that occurred two weeks after the London bombings of 7 July 2005 in which 52 people were killed, in a High Court appeal lodged by the family. After the conviction of Munir Hussain on 14 December 2009 for attacking a burglar, Starmer defended the conviction, saying: "We would only ever bring a prosecution where we thought that the degree of force was unreasonable [...] these are very rare cases".

Starmer was involved in the decision to prosecute Omari Roberts, a trainee builder who killed a teenage burglar in a struggle at the home of Roberts's mother. The prosecution case relied on the evidence of a second teenage burglar and was dropped on 19 April 2010, with Roberts being found not guilty.

In 2009, Starmer opposed the Conservative Party proposal of repealing the Human Rights Act 1998, which Starmer called a "clear and basic statement of our citizens' human rights". Liberty and the Liberal Democrats supported Starmer, while the Conservative MP David TC Davies suggested he should be dismissed.

In 2009, he called for greater transparency and modernisation in the CPS, including less reliance on paper files. In 2011, he introduced reforms that included the "first test paperless hearing".

Starmer speaking about assisted suicide consultation, 2011

In February 2010, Starmer announced the CPS's decision to prosecute three Labour MPs and a Conservative peer for offences relating to false accounting in the aftermath of the parliamentary expenses scandal. They were all found guilty. In the same year, he supported proposals to legally recognise different degrees of murder. In 2010 and 2012, Starmer said that there was insufficient evidence to prosecute two members of the UK security services for their alleged role in torture overseas; he supported further investigation.

In July 2010, Starmer announced the decision not to prosecute the police officer Simon Harwood in relation to the death of Ian Tomlinson. After a later inquest found that Tomlinson had been unlawfully killed, Starmer announced that Harwood would be prosecuted for manslaughter. The officer was acquitted by a jury in July 2012 but dismissed from the police that September.

Starmer speaking about domestic violence, 2011

In September 2010, Stephen Lawrence murder suspects Gary Dobson and David Norris were arrested and charged. Dobson had previously been acquitted of the crime; on 23 October 2010, Starmer applied to the Court of Appeal for his original acquittal to be quashed. The two were sentenced on 4 January 2012 with minimum terms of 15 years and 2 months for Dobson and 14 years and 3 months for Norris.

In December 2010, Starmer revised the policy to require his personal approval for prosecuting women who retract rape allegations, following a case where a woman was convicted of perverting the course of justice, despite judges believing her claims of long-term abuse, intimidation, and rape by her husband were true. He later produced guidelines to prevent women in similar circumstances from being unfairly prosecuted.

In 2011, thirteen serving and former police officers were prosecuted for perverting the course of justice in the 1988 murder of Lynette White. The prosecution were unable to provide documents which "could have helped" the defendants, that were claimed to have been destroyed by the police officer leading the case against them. The prosecution made the decision, approved by Starmer, not to offer any further evidence, and the trial collapsed. Starmer ordered a review into the circumstances that had led to the decision and ordered a further review in 2012 when the missing documents were found.

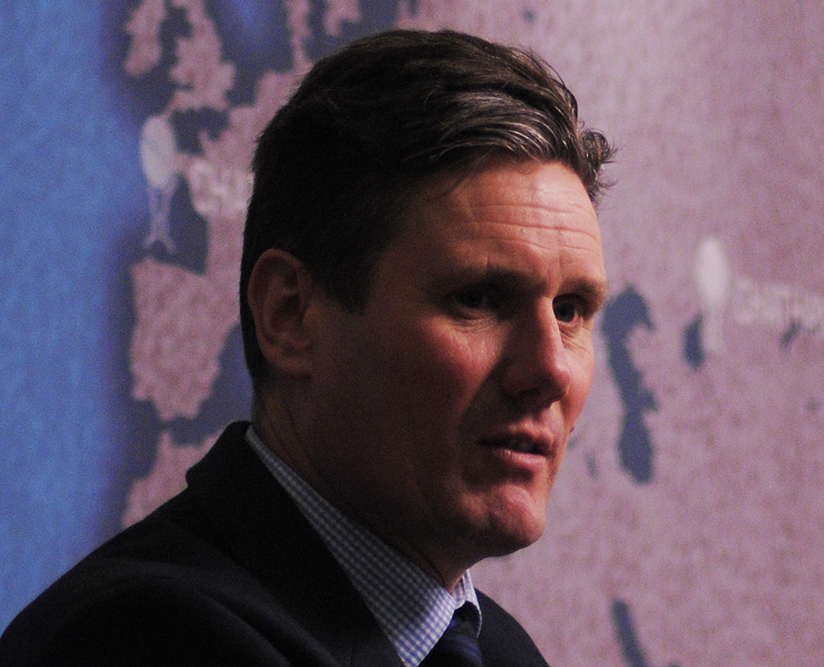
Starmer speaking at Chatham House in 2013

Starmer prioritised rapid prosecutions of those involved in the 2011 England riots over long sentences, which he later said had helped to bring "the situation back under control". Later that year, after revelations concerning the undercover police infiltration of environmental campaigns, Starmer ordered a review of related convictions and invited protestors convicted of aggravated trespass to appeal their sentences. Starmer declined to authorise a wider enquiry, after a report from the judge Christopher Rose found the issue to be a result of individual fault rather than a systemic problem.

In February 2012, Starmer announced that Cameron–Clegg coalition cabinet minister Chris Huhne, and his former wife, Vicky Pryce, would be prosecuted for perverting the course of justice in R v Huhne. Later that year, he wrote advice for prosecutors, saying that they should consider whether violent protestors organised or prepared for violence, compared to protestors who got "caught up in illegal actions". In the summer of 2012, journalist Nick Cohen wrote that Starmer was personally responsible for prosecuting Paul Chambers in the Twitter joke trial. Chambers' conviction was quashed after a third appeal. The CPS denied that Starmer was behind the decision, saying that it was the responsibility of a Crown Court and was out of Starmer's hands. Later that year, Starmer published a plan for the criminal justice system to better handle cases of female genital mutilation; at the time, the offence had never been successfully prosecuted. At the end of 2012, he published guidance on prosecuting cases of grossly offensive posts on social media that called for caution in prosecuting cases, and considering whether users quickly removed posts or showed remorse.

Starmer discussing prosecutions involving social media, 2013

When Jimmy Savile's sexual abuse crimes were exposed in 2012, Starmer said amid the subsequent scandal that "It was like a dam had bust and people rightfully wanted to know why he had been allowed to get away with it for so long." Starmer was then made aware that there had been four complaints made against Savile to police in Surrey and Sussex about his abuse during 2007 and 2008, but a decision had been taken against prosecuting him on the grounds that his victims themselves did not support court action and there was insufficient evidence. Starmer responded by saying "It never came close to crossing my desk and the local CPS lawyer who looked at the case did not even mention the decision to his immediate boss because, to him, it seemed routine." In 2013, during the Operation Yewtree police investigation into Savile's crimes, Starmer announced changes to how sexual abuse investigations were handled, including a panel to review cases of sexual abuse.

Starmer's proposals were intended to make it easier for victims of violent crime to come forward and to facilitate their participation in criminal proceedings. In the same year, he published a study showing that false reports of rape were rare, saying that the "devastating impact of false allegations" and the perception that they are more common than the data support mean that police forces might adopt what he called a cautious approach that can "lead to injustice for victims" of rape. He also started an inquiry into the cause of a reduction in police reports of rape and domestic abuse. Also in 2013, Starmer altered guidelines for those improperly claiming benefits enabling them to face ten years in prison under the Fraud Act instead of a maximum of seven years under more specific legislation.

Starmer represented Croatia at the genocide hearings at the International Court of Justice in The Hague in 2014, arguing that Serbia wanted to seize a third of Croatian territory during the 1990s war and eradicate the Croatian population. Also in 2014, Starmer published guidance on when not to prosecute cases where compassion was the sole motivator in assisting a relative to access assisted dying overseas, following the Supreme Court Martin case. In 2015, he intervened and voted in support of Rob Marris's Private Member's Bill on assisted dying.

Starmer left office in November 2013, and was replaced by Alison Saunders. Later that month, the Labour Party announced that Starmer would lead an enquiry into changing the law to give further protection to victims in cases of rape and child abuse. From 2011 to 2014, Starmer received honorary degrees from several universities, and was appointed Knight Commander of the Order of the Bath (KCB) by Charles, Prince of Wales in the 2014 New Year Honours for services to law and criminal justice.

== Legacy ==
On 31 January 2022, then prime minister Boris Johnson blamed Starmer for the non-prosecution of Savile when Starmer was Director of Public Prosecutions. Starmer was DPP in the years immediately prior to Savile's death but there is no evidence he was involved in the decision to not have him prosecuted. Johnson was heavily criticised for the comment and his policy adviser Munira Mirza resigned three days later, saying Johnson had made "a scurrilous accusation" against Starmer. Also on 3 February, Johnson defended his comments to Sky News by stating that, in 2013, Starmer apologised because the CPS had not investigated Savile; however, Johnson then added: "I totally understand that he [Starmer] had nothing to do personally with those decisions". Subsequently, on 7 February, Starmer and MP David Lammy were ambushed by people who shouted abuse at Starmer outside Parliament. A man and a woman were arrested after a traffic cone was thrown at police officers. Johnson tweeted that it was "absolutely disgraceful" and thanked the police for acting swiftly. Shayan Sardarizadeh for BBC Monitoring said the protest was an attempt to recreate the Ottawa "freedom convoy" protests in the UK, and noted that the activists' references to Magna Carta indicated the protesters were members of the sovereign citizen movement. Conservatives such as Simon Hoare and Julian Smith, the former chief whip, called for Johnson to apologise. MP Kim Leadbeater and Brendan Cox, the sister and husband respectively of murdered MP Jo Cox, warned against politicians lending credence to far-right conspiracy theories. The following day, a Downing Street source said that Johnson still would not apologise to Starmer. Following the 7 February incident, extremists issued multiple death threats against Starmer and other Labour MPs. The Center for Countering Digital Hate (CCDH) sent material to the Metropolitan Police. Imran Ahmed of the CCDH stated, "Every time a violent extremist makes a threat of violence and gets away with it, the norms of those groups worsen, and others are driven to newer depths of behaviour."

In September 2023, Starmer pledged to be “ruthless” with his plans to fix the English Channel migrant crossings, referencing his record as director of public prosecutions when he said he “delivered” on attempts to protect the British public from dangerous criminals, stating: “My Labour government will be ruthless in our plan to smash criminal smuggling gangs and secure our borders. As director of public prosecutions, I went after dangerous criminals to protect the British public. And I delivered. I’ll do it again.” The pledge to “smash the gangs” became a hallmark of Labour’s 2024 general election campaign, although a crackdown on immigration did not feature in the party’s five core “missions”.

On 2 January 2025, Conservative leader Kemi Badenoch criticised Starmer's Labour government for not supporting a government-led inquiry into the Oldham child sexual exploitation scandal. Oldham Council's request for a public inquiry had been rejected by both Jess Phillips, the current Parliamentary Under-Secretary of State for Safeguarding and Violence Against Women and Girls, and the previous Conservative government, in favour of a locally-run inquiry. Subsequently, the American businessesman and politicial figure Elon Musk, the owner of Twitter, said Starmer was "complicit in the crimes", as head of the Crown Prosecution Service when the abuse occurred. Starmer was head of the CPS in 2009 when a decision was made not to prosecute an individual who was part of the Rochdale child sex abuse ring; however, there is no evidence Starmer was personally involved in the decision. In response, Starmer said the Conservatives had failed to implement the recommendations of the 2022 Independent Inquiry into Child Sexual Abuse (IICSA). He also said that, under him, the CPS had "the highest number of child sexual abuse cases being prosecuted on record", and that politicians and activists were "spreading lies and misinformation" over grooming gangs to appeal to the far-right. (Note: Starmer said: "When politicians, and I mean politicians, who sat in government for many years are casual about honesty, decency, truth and the rule of law, calling for inquiries because they want to jump on a bandwagon of the far-right, then that affects politics because a robust debate can only be based on the true facts and that is why this is actually an important point about our politics, not about what anybody may or may not say on Twitter. My fight to change the way that the prosecution service operated is a matter of public record. Making sure the men responsible for these despicable acts were brought to justice. Put in the dock... then behind bars. That is why I brought the first prosecution for a grooming gang. Far-right voices have tried to rewrite history. Those spreading lies and misinformation are not interested in the victims. Those cheerleading for Tommy Robinson - a thug who was jailed for almost collapsing a grooming case - are not interested in justice. They are only interested in themselves.") Professor Alexis Jay, who chaired the IICSA, said: "It doesn't need more consultation, it does not need more research or discussion, it just needs to be done." BBC Verify said there was no evidence Starmer was involved in decisions not to prosecute in Oldham.

== Awards and honours ==
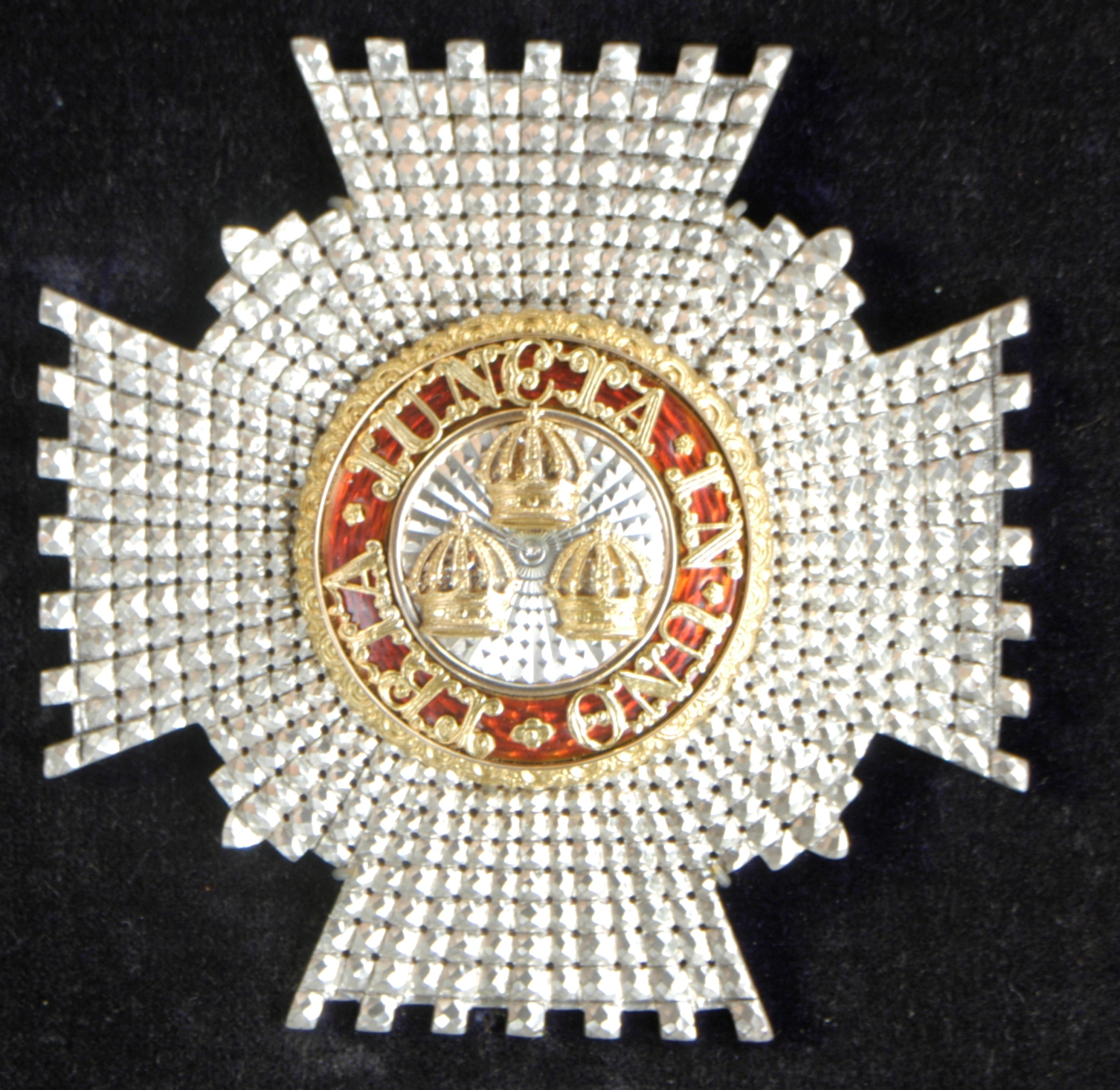
KCB breast star

In 2002, Starmer took silk, being appointed Queen's Counsel (QC). He received the Bar Council's Sydney Elland Goldsmith Award in 2005 for his outstanding contribution to pro bono work in challenging the death penalty in Uganda, Kenya, Malawi, and the Caribbean.

For his meritorious "services to law and criminal justice", Starmer was appointed a Knight Commander of the Order of the Bath (KCB) in the 2014 New Year Honours, making Starmer a "Sir".

Honorary degrees issued to Keir Starmer
Date	School	Degree
21 July 2011	University of Essex	Doctor of university (D.U.)
16 July 2012	University of Leeds	Doctor of Laws (LL.D.)
19 November 2013	University of East London	Doctor of university (D.U.)
19 December 2013	London School of Economics	Doctor of Laws (LL.D.)
14 July 2014	University of Reading	Doctor of Laws (LL.D.)
18 November 2014	University of Worcester	Doctor of university (D.U.)

== Publications ==
Starmer is the author and editor of several books about criminal law and human rights, including:

- Justice in Error (1993), edited with Clive Walker, London: Blackstone, ISBN 1-85431-234-0.
- The Three Pillars of Liberty: Political Rights and Freedoms in the United Kingdom (1996), with Francesca Klug and Stuart Weir, London: Routledge, ISBN 0-415-09641-3.
- Signing Up for Human Rights: The United Kingdom and International Standards (1998), with Conor Foley, London: Amnesty International United Kingdom, ISBN 1-873328-30-3.
- Miscarriages of Justice: A Review of Justice in Error (1999), edited with Clive Walker, London: Blackstone, ISBN 1-85431-687-7.
- European Human Rights Law: the Human Rights Act 1998 and the European Convention on Human Rights (1999), London: Legal Action Group, ISBN 0-905099-77-X.
- Criminal Justice, Police Powers and Human Rights (2001), with Anthony Jennings, Tim Owen, Michelle Strange, and Quincy Whitaker, London: Blackstone, ISBN 1-84174-138-8.
- Blackstone's Human Rights Digest (2001), with Iain Byrne, London: Blackstone, ISBN 1-84174-153-1.
- A Report on the Policing of the Ardoyne Parades 12 July 2004 (2004), with Jane Gordon, Belfast: Northern Ireland Policing Board.
- Human Rights Manual and Sourcebook For Africa (2005)
