= Suicide of Eleanor de Freitas =

English suicide victim involved in precedent setting defamation lawsuit

Eleanor de Freitas
- Born: Eleanor Poppy Miranda de Freitas; 26 June 1990
- Died: 4 April 2014 (aged 23); Fulham, London, England, United Kingdom
- Cause of death: Suicide by hanging
- Education: Putney High School
- Occupations: Retail clerk; trainee accountant
- Parent(s): David de Freitas; Miranda de Freitas

Eleanor Poppy Miranda de Freitas (26 June 1990 – 4 April 2014) was an English woman who died by suicide three days before the commencement of her trial for perverting the course of justice for allegedly making a false accusation of rape. Her death prompted a debate over whether prosecuting people accused of making a false accusation of rape could deter rape victims from reporting the crime, as well as whether it was appropriate to prosecute vulnerable individuals (de Freitas had been diagnosed with bipolar disorder and depression, and was judged by a psychiatrist to represent a suicide risk).

The decision to prosecute de Freitas was ultimately upheld by both the Director of Public Prosecutions and the Attorney General for England and Wales, while the Metropolitan Police Service paid compensation to the accused man. In 2026, the UN Committee on the Elimination of Discrimination against Women ruled that the UK had violated de Freitas' rights by prosecuting her. From a legal perspective, the case was notable due to the use of a private prosecution (relatively uncommon under English law) and, subsequently, the first successful employment of a public interest defence to a charge of defamation.

== Timeline of events ==
=== Background ===
Eleanor Poppy Miranda de Freitas was born on 26 June 1990 and grew up in Fulham, London. She attended the private Putney High School, achieving straight As in her A Level exams. In September 2008 she enrolled in Grey College, Durham University to study geography. During her first year, she suffered a mental breakdown. She was diagnosed with bipolar disorder and depression and began seeing a psychiatrist, who prescribed her antidepressants. At the end of the 2008/09 academic year, de Freitas dropped out of Durham University. In August 2009, she was referred to a consultant psychiatrist, whom she attended until her death. De Freitas' psychiatrist initially diagnosed her with recurrent depressive disorder, which in October 2010 was amended to a diagnosis of bipolar disorder; her condition was treated using medications including diazepam, escitalopram, lamotrigine, and quetiapine.

In February 2012, de Freitas had another mental breakdown, exhibiting "manic, depressive and disinhibited" behaviour. She accused her parents of trying to poison her and her landlord of sexually assaulting her; went on unaffordable shopping sprees; and became delusional. She was involuntarily committed under the Mental Health Act 1983 and spent a month in Ealing Hospital, where she was reportedly mentally and physically abused. After successfully challenging her detention at a Mental Health Review Tribunal and being released, de Freitas began living alone with support from her parents and working part-time in a branch of The Body Shop on King's Road in Chelsea. Unbeknown to her parents, she reportedly also worked as a tantric masseuse and escort. In summer 2013, she began training as an accountant.

=== Rape allegation ===
In 2008 or 2009, de Freitas met Alexander Economou, the sometime company secretary of his family-run shipping agency. They became acquaintances after attending the same party in Chelsea in October 2012. They met on 23 December 2012 and spent that evening and the night together at Mr Economou's flat, where they had sex. During the daytime on 24 December, they went shopping together to an Ann Summers sex shop. After they parted company Economou performed Internet searches, and as a result of what he found, told de Freitas via a telephone call not to contact him. When Economou ended the relationship, de Freitas was upset and made this known to others, including sending a text to one friend saying Economou had "fucked her and chucked her" and to another saying "I don't understand what I have done wrong???"

On 31 December 2012, de Freitas stated to her psychiatrist that she had been sexually assaulted on 24 December. On the same day, de Freitas attended a GUM clinic. On 4 January 2013, de Freitas alleged to the Metropolitan Police Service that Economou had raped her between the 23 and 24 December. In an interview with police officers, she asserted that she "wasn't in control of my body"; that Economou had "drugged" her; that she had been "frozen with fear"; and that Economou had coerced her into allowing him to tie her up, "waterboard" her, and have unprotected sex with her. Economou was arrested and spent a night in custody. On 20 February 2013, the Metropolitan Police Service decided to take no further action against Economou; he was never charged. Factors reportedly underpinning the decision included a lack of forensic evidence; text messages and CCTV footage apparently showing friendly behaviour between de Freitas and Economou following the alleged offence; Economou's lack of a criminal record; and de Freitas having previously been cautioned for theft. Economou asserted that the sex had been consensual; that he had ended the relationship on 24 December 2012 after conducting Internet searches suggesting de Freitas was working as a tantric masseuse and after receiving "crazy" text messages from de Freitas; and that de Freitas had fabricated the rape claim "as an act of revenge, because I rejected her". On 22 February 2013, Economou was given a harassment warning from the police regarding messages he had sent to de Freitas concerning her allegations.

=== Prosecution ===
In August 2013, Economou launched a private prosecution of de Freitas for perverting the course of justice at a cost of approximately £200,000 (equivalent to £280,418 in 2025). Economou amassed witness statements, text messages and closed-circuit television footage that the Director of Public Prosecutions said contradicted the account of de Freitas, including footage of de Freitas and himself shopping together for sex toys at an Ann Summers shop on the day following the alleged rape and text messages de Freitas had sent to mutual friends. Upon receiving the summons on 13 August 2013, de Freitas reportedly had a panic attack. She engaged a defence solicitor who invited Keir Starmer, the Director of Public Prosecutions of the Crown Prosecution Service, to use his statutory power to take over the private prosecution and end it. On 5 December 2013, the Crown Prosecution Service stated that they had reviewed the case papers from both sides, and were satisfied that the evidential stage and public interest stage of the Full Code Test were met, and therefore decided to continue with the prosecution themselves. De Freitas subsequently enquired whether there was scope to seek an injunction against reporting on the prosecution. The Metropolitan Police Service officers who had investigated the alleged rape refused to support the Crown Prosecution Service but were overruled; the detectives who had investigated the rape allegation were subjected to a "lengthy" misconduct investigation. De Freitas was arraigned at Southwark Crown Court on 24 January 2014, pleading not guilty. A trial date was set for 7 April 2014.

Upon the commencement of the prosecution, de Freitas' rape counselling sessions, provided by the Women and Girls Network, were reduced and she was told she could not discuss anything potentially of relevance to the trial, and that statements made in the sessions could compromise her testimony (in March 2015, Member of Parliament Valerie Vaz asked Solicitor General for England and Wales Robert Buckland to "review the guidance to ensure that the provision of support and counselling services to vulnerable people is not removed abruptly"). De Freitas became "severely" depressed and her behaviour became erratic, including claiming she was being followed and that her phone was being tapped and wearing a burqa when going out in public. In September 2013, she was found in a branch of Co-op Food on Strand throwing crisp packets and shouting at staff. In December 2013, de Freitas attempted to drive from London to Northamptonshire to spend Christmas with her family but, after taking a wrong turn on the A1 road, continued driving until running out of petrol; her father characterised this as disorientation stemming from trauma. A psychiatric report prepared for the Crown Prosecution Service stated that de Freitas was fit to stand trial but required constant evaluation as she posed a "chronic and significant" suicide risk. Her doctor did not prescribe lithium for her bipolar disorder as de Freitas suffered from a fear of needles. In March 2014, de Freitas' psychiatrist recorded that she was demonstrating "mild depressive symptoms". Her suicidal ideation prior to her death had been scored at zero.

=== Suicide ===
On the afternoon of 4 April 2014, de Freitas died by hanging herself at her family home in Fulham, London. Her trial for perverting the course of justice had been due to commence on 7 April. She left a suicide note in which she stated, "If I were to lose the case I know that I would have brought huge shame on the family. It's entirely my fault for what has happened and there are many other events which make me make this decision." She also expressed fears about potentially having to testify in court in her defence and stated she was "ashamed to be British". De Freitas had previously expressed fears about being involuntarily committed once again.

At an inquest held by the West London Coroner's Court in March 2015, coroner Chinyere Inyama recorded a verdict of suicide by hanging and noted that the impending trial had been a "significant stressor" on de Freitas. A call by solicitor Harriet Wistrich on behalf of de Freitas' family to widen the scope of the inquest to assess whether the Crown Prosecution Service had breached the right to life enshrined in the Human Rights Act 1998 by prosecuting de Freitas was unsuccessful. The call for a special inquest was supported by Emily Thornberry, the then-Shadow Attorney General for England and Wales.

=== Reaction ===
Following de Freitas' suicide, her father David criticised the decision to prosecute her, stating, "We can see no reason whatsoever why the CPS pursued Eleanor. If the CPS had put a stop to it at the time I would still have a daughter." David de Freitas suggested that de Freitas had feared once again being involuntarily committed and was embarrassed that "extraneous evidence" would emerge during the trial alleging work in the sex industry. De Freitas had been concerned about having to testify in her defence in court; delays by the Crown Prosecution Service in providing a record of her interview with police to her defence solicitor meant they were unable to confirm that she would not be required to testify until the morning of her death (a court order requiring the Crown Prosecution Service to disclose all evidence at least six weeks prior to the trial was not complied with). The Crown Prosecution Service later apologised for the delay in the disclosure of the evidence, whilst still blaming the police for the delay.

The decision to prosecute de Freitas was also criticised by the organisation Women Against Rape, which argued that the "aggressive pursuit" of women accused of making false allegations of rape in the United Kingdom was deterring rape victims from reporting the crime to the police. The charity Victim Support released a statement expressing concerns about the use of private prosecutions to "intimidate" people making allegations of rape, while the charity Justice for Women stated "the public interest is always overwhelmingly in favour of not prosecuting a rape complainant" and "it is imperative that the overwhelming public interest in improving the UK's appallingly low conviction rate for rape offences is considered by all prosecutors when deciding whether to charge women for perverting the course of justice". Lisa Avalos, of the Louisiana State University Paul M. Hebert Law Center, stated that the United Kingdom makes significantly more prosecutions for false rape allegations than the United States, and that these carry a charge of perverting the course of justice (with a maximum sentence of life in prison) rather than false reporting (which carries lighter penalties such as community service, fines, or probation). The charity Inquest cited statistics showing "no country pursues the prosecution of disbelieved rape complainants with the frequency that occurs in Britain". Writing in January 2022, Harriet Wistrich of the Centre for Women's Justice stated that "bipolar disorder, the illness that Eleanor was diagnosed with, can cause hypersexuality during manic episodes" and that "it is an enduring tragedy for Eleanor's family that the CPS pursued this prosecution when a psychiatric report warned of the risk of completed suicide." Writing in The Critic in February 2022, Julie Bindel stated that "the CPS is advised to exercise extreme caution when deciding whether to prosecute on suspicion of making a false allegation, especially if the person is vulnerable or if it is unclear whether the accusation was made maliciously".

An alternative view was expressed by journalist Radhika Sanghani, who wrote that "false rape allegations can have devastating consequences for the accused" and noted that over a 17 month period in 2011 to 2012 there were only 35 prosecutions for false rape allegations in England and Wales, compared to 5,651 prosecutions for rape. Sarah Green of the End Violence Against Women Coalition opined, "We must prosecute these cases if someone's trying to maliciously get someone into trouble."

In November 2014, Member of Parliament Geraint Davies referenced "the Crown Prosecution Service supporting the charges against Eleanor de Freitas of false allegations of rape that resulted in her suicide" during a discussion on the Wanless Review in the House of Commons, asking Home Secretary Theresa May "what assurances can the Home Secretary give to victims of public figures who abused them that the [Crown Prosecution Service] will not pursue counter-claims against them that might lead to deterrence or, indeed, their suicide?" May replied that "the Crown Prosecution Service is an independent body in relation to decisions that it takes about prosecutions."

In the 2019 publication Personal Participation in Criminal Proceedings, Dr. Kate Leader wrote that the case "has drawn attention to the issues that can arise from private prosecutions". In mid-2020, the House of Commons Justice Select Committee made a call for evidence on an inquiry into the use of private prosecutions. The Centre for Women's Justice provided written evidence to the inquiry in which it stated "Eleanor, for example, was never interviewed as a suspect; she sat in the dock without having ever been arrested, or her rights explained to her as a defendant, and without having had the opportunity to respond to the allegations against her."

=== Subsequent legal proceedings ===
"Having considered the detail and the issues raised by the family, I am satisfied that the decision making in this case was correct and that it was made in accordance with our policies and guidance. [...] The evidence in this case was strong and having considered it in light of all of our knowledge and guidance on prosecuting sexual offences and allegedly false rape claims, it is clear there was sufficient evidence for a realistic prospect of conviction for perverting the course of justice. This was evidence including text messages and CCTV footage that directly contradicted the account Ms de Freitas gave to the police. [...] I am satisfied that prosecutors had taken the necessary steps in assuring themselves that Ms de Freitas' mental health had been properly considered. [...] There has been speculation that the police did not agree with the prosecution for various reasons. However, the police never undertook an investigation into the alleged perverting the course of justice nor did they consider all the material provided to us by the private prosecution. They were therefore not in a position to form a view on whether there was sufficient evidence to prosecute."

— Alison Saunders, Director of Public Prosecutions

De Freitas' suicide prompted Director of Public Prosecutions Alison Saunders to review the decision to prosecute. In December 2014, Saunders concluded that it had been correct to do so, stating that there was "sufficient evidence for a realistic prospect of conviction" and "a strong public interest in prosecuting". Saunders also stated that medical experts had advised that de Freitas was fit to stand trial. After de Freitas' father David called for a new inquiry or a review to be carried out, in June 2018, Attorney General for England and Wales Jeremy Wright decided not to order an independent inquiry into the decision to prosecute, stating, "I have carefully considered the concerns raised by Mr de Freitas and I am satisfied that this case has already been subject to extensive scrutiny within the CPS, and that it was right for the prosecution to go ahead."

In December 2014, Alexander Economou began a libel claim against David de Freitas, asserting that seven publications, including articles critical of the Crown Prosecution Service appearing in The Daily Telegraph and The Guardian and an interview with John Humphrys on the Today programme broadcast on BBC Radio 4, had resulted in his enduring "public rubbishing" and damaged his reputation. The claim was dismissed in July 2016 with the judge ruling that, while five of the seven the publications had defamatory meaning and had caused harm to Economou's reputation, this was justified given de Freitas had considered the articles and broadcast to be in the public interest and that ruling in favour of Economou would represent a disproportionate infringement upon de Freitas' freedom of speech. The judge stated "When a person suffering from mental ill-health kills herself at a time when she is facing public prosecution for making a false allegation of rape there is a clear public interest in considering whether there is a causal link and, if so, whether the decision-making was at fault and there are lessons to be learned." This represented the first time a public interest defence had been successfully mounted under the Defamation Act 2013. The implication of the judgement was that "...in relation to mere contributors to publications, it was held that their standard of conduct need not reach that of professional journalists to quality for the absolute public interest defence". An appeal by Economou against the ruling was dismissed by the Court of Appeal in November 2018. Economou subsequently sought permission to appeal to the Supreme Court of the United Kingdom which was refused. Whilst David de Freitas's public interest defence was not directly challenged in the Supreme Court, it was examined at some length in the defamation appeal in Serafin v Malkiewicz and others. Lord Wilson, delivering the unanimous judgement of the five-member panel, dismissed this criticism with the words "I can discern no basis for that criticism". Economou v de Freitas has since been cited in other legal proceedings, for example the libel claim Hay v Cresswell.

In May 2015, the BBC issued a retraction and apology after Lisa Longstaff of Women Against Rape indirectly referred to Economou as a "rapist" while being interviewed on a live episode of Victoria Derbyshire.

In December 2015, Economou was charged with harassing David de Freitas. It was alleged that Economou had sent letters and emails to de Freitas and his solicitor, Harriet Wistrich, and "uploaded various recordings and comments onto websites". Economou was found not guilty in June 2016, with the judge stating, "I find that the defendant's actions were calculated to counter the continuing incorrect assertions that the allegation of rape was true".

On 9 March 2016, the High Court of Justice ruled that there were "no arguable grounds" to overturn the inquest and launch a national enquiry that David de Freitas had requested through a judicial review application. The court found that "The CPS here had medical evidence, including that was relied in by those representing the deceased, which did not identify any real or immediate risk to life. No representations were made to the CPS, in the days immediately preceding her death, to the effect that her condition was worsening and that the prosecution was endangering her life."

In November 2018, Economou received £10,000 (equivalent to £13,041 in 2025) of compensation from the Metropolitan Police Service, in connection with its investigation of the initial complaint made by de Freitas.

In October 2026, responding to a complaint brought by David de Freitas, the UN Committee on the Elimination of Discrimination against Women (CEDAW) ruled that the UK had violated the rights of Eleanor de Freitas by prosecuting her, ruling that allowing an alleged perpetrator to bring criminal proceedings against a rape complainant without safeguards could disproportionately affect women and discourage reporting of sexual violence, amounting to indirect discrimination. The CEDAW further found that the CPS had failed to give due weight to de Freitas' bipolar disorder and to the potential for cumulative harm, violating her rights to equality before the law and effective access to justice. The CEDAW called for the UK to amend legislation to only allow prosecutions concerning false allegations of rape to be brought by public prosecutors; to conduct gender-sensitive assessments of such cases; to implement effective safeguards against retaliation and re-victimisation; to provide appropriate training for prosecutors, judges, and police; to provide reparations to David de Freitas, including compensation for material and moral harm; and to expunge de Freitas' name from judicial records. The UK was requested to report back within six months on measures taken to implement the recommendations.
