= Abdul Raoof Al Shayeb =

Bahraini political activist

Abdul Raoof Al Shayeb (Arabic: عبد الروؤف الشايب, born 1965) is a Bahraini political activist and the official spokesman for the National Committee for Martyrs and Victims of Torture (NCMVT). Formerly the head of the Khalas Movement, he is an influential human rights leader in the country who was tried on allegations of attempting to blow up the King Fahd Causeway. He was born to a devout Alawite Shia family that ran a hussainiya (commemoration hall for Ashura ceremonies) in Manama, the capital.

== Trial in Britain ==
Asharq Al-Awsat reported in its December 9, 2015 issue that “Bahraini dissident Abdul Raoof Al Shayeb is facing charges of terrorism, according to sources from the Snaresbrook Crown Court in East London yesterday.” For the second week in a row, the British court was reviewing criminal evidence against Al Shayeb, who obtained a British passport in 2007, which had the potential to land him up to fifteen years in prison under the Terrorism Acts.

Police had raided Al Shayeb's home in northwest London in April 2014 and found documents on formation tactics and the use of a variety of weapons. Prosecutor Max Hill asked Al Shayeb how he had been an activist from the age of fourteen and bout evidence in the latter's possession such as images of rifles, missiles, firing angles, and pictures in military fatigues, accusing the defendant of lying when he said "he does not know how this evidence leaked to his apartment, despite his earlier confirmation that it belongs to him." In 2015, the court sentenced Al Shayeb to five years in prison, but he was released after three in 2018.
