= Women Against Rape =

Organization in the UK

- Abbreviation: WAR
- Formation: 1976
- Founded at: London
- Type: NGO
- Website: womenagainstrape.net

Women Against Rape (WAR) is a UK organisation founded in 1976. In their original Statement of Aims, they demanded: recognition of rape of every kind; not just by strangers but by husbands, fathers and stepfathers. They demanded that every woman must have the financial independence to escape rape and domestic violence. They said victims are entitled to compensation, along with victims of other violent crimes, from the Criminal Injuries Compensation Board (renamed Criminal Injuries Compensation Authority). They also said that all women should be entitled to justice, and not be "put on trial". WAR provides support for anyone fighting for justice in their own case, and that casework shapes its campaigns.

== Campaigns ==
=== Rape in marriage ===
Starting in the mid-1970s WAR campaigned for rape in marriage to be made illegal. The first public event was a mock rape trial in Trafalgar Square in 1977, where women testified about violence they had suffered and who was responsible, including those in authority and employers. WAR initiated the slogan: "Yes means yes, No means, no. However we dress; wherever we go." The campaign took 15 years, with the law successfully amended in 1991.

=== Legal precedent ===
In 1995, WAR, with Legal Action for Women and the English Collective of Prostitutes, assisted two women to bring the first private prosecution for rape in England and Wales after the Crown Prosecution Service (CPS) refused to bring charges. Using the same evidence the CPS had indicated was insufficient, a conviction was achieved, with a 14-year sentence imposed (later reduced to 11 years on appeal).

In 2015, Lesley Delmenico used the transcript of the trial as the basis of the play Pursuing Justice – Sex workers take their rapist to court.

=== Criminal justice system ===
WAR has consistently criticised the authorities' treatment of rape victims. They publicise women's experiences of the police and court responses to rape, such as when they routinely accuse women of lying. They argue that police investigations have lost or neglected evidence, the CPS close too many cases, and prosecutors are less prepared and less robust than the defence. They call for those in authority who do not do their jobs properly to be held accountable: dismissed, and prosecuted where they break the law.

=== Survivors seeking asylum ===
From 1991 to the present day, WAR has worked with Black Women's Rape Action Project and Legal Action for Women to provide services to, and campaign with, asylum seekers who had been raped, but are routinely disbelieved by the authorities in order to deny them safety and asylum in the UK.

=== Child rape ===
In 2013 they held a protest outside the Old Bailey to highlight media racism when a group of men from Oxford were on trial. In 2014 WAR submitted 37 questions to the Home Affairs Select Committee regarding the responsibilities of various authorities for child rape in Rotherham.

=== False allegations ===
In 2014 WAR publicly criticised the increasing numbers of women being prosecuted for false allegations of rape and claimed some were innocent or should never have been jailed. They released the figure that 109 women had been prosecuted for lying in seven years. WAR took its seven-year campaign into Parliament and gave a platform to family campaigns who said they and their loved ones had been victims of a miscarriage of justice.

=== Domestic violence ===
WAR campaigns for the police to stop separating investigations of rape and domestic violence when they are committed by the same man, and part of a pattern. They say that juries are less likely to convict if they are deprived of information.

=== Separation of children from mothers ===
WAR is part of the Support not Separation coalition, founded in 2017 to prevent the unwarranted separation of children from their mothers, particularly following domestic violence. They say witnessing violence is not as harmful as separation from their main carer.

=== Criminal injuries compensation ===
In 2018 WAR's national campaign for compensation, working with applicants throughout England and Wales, helped win major concessions from the courts and government to review eligibility rules which disproportionately deny compensation to victims of sexual violence.

=== Opposing austerity cuts ===
WAR actively supported legal challenges including of the benefit cap, that Personal Independence Payment should take into account mental illness caused by rape trauma and oppose the two-child limit on tax credits, and protested cuts to legal aid and women's support services. All of these have cut women's and children's escape routes out of violence. WAR campaigns for financial independence for women as well as resources so women and children can escape rape and domestic violence.

=== Opposing sexual harassment ===
The Bakers, Food and Allied Workers' Union (BFAWU) approached WAR to assist in the union's campaign against sexual harassment and violence in the fast food and hospitality industries. The union aims to ensure that workers can report abuse, win justice and stop further violence.

== See also ==
- Men Against Rape and Discrimination
- Death of Eleanor de Freitas

== Publications ==
- The Rapist who Pays the Rent: Women's Case for Changing the Law on Rape: Evidence Submitted by Women Against Rape, Britain, to the Criminal Law Revision Committee, 1981 and 1984, by Ruth Hall, Selma James and Judit Kertesz, Falling Wall Press. Called on the CLRC to make rape in marriage a crime, which the Committee was then considering.
- Ask Any Woman - A London Inquiry into Rape and Sexual Assault, 1985, Ruth Hall, Falling Wall Press. Its finding that 1 in 7 women had suffered rape within their marriage was reinforced by World in Action which in the same year released exactly the same figure. The survey also revealed the first-ever figures on racist sexual assault, and reasons why women did not report to the police.
- Dossier of cases the CPS should have prosecuted, documented 15 cases which never reached court because the CPS judged their character too harshly.
- Justice is Your Right – A Self Help Guide for rape victims and their supporters
