= Nikolai Glushkov =

Russian businessman (1949–2018)

- Николай Глушков
- Born: Nikolay Alekseevich Glushkov; 24 December 1949; Russian SFSR, Soviet Union
- Died: 12 March 2018 (aged 68); New Malden, London

Nikolay Alekseevich Glushkov (Russian: Николай Алексеевич Глушков; 24 December 1949 – 12 March 2018) was a Russian businessman who was the deputy director of Aeroflot and a finance manager for AvtoVAZ who died in suspicious circumstances. After claiming that Aeroflot worked as a "cash cow to support international spying operations", he was arrested and tried in Russia on the allegation of funnelling Aeroflot money through another company in 1999. He was convicted and released in 2004, after serving three years. He emigrated to the UK in 2010 and received political asylum. In 2017, he was convicted in absentia in Russia for stealing money from Aeroflot, but his extradition from Britain had been denied. Initially treated as "unexplained", Glushkov's death was investigated by the Metropolitan Police as a murder inquiry. On 9 April 2021, the West London Coroner's Court ruled Glushkov was unlawfully killed, with injuries consistent with strangulation.

== Biography ==
=== Early life ===
In 1972, Nikolai Glushkov graduated from the Moscow Peoples' Friendship University with a degree in physics. In 1981, he completed the Academy of Foreign Trade with a degree in economics.

=== Aeroflot job, arrests, trials, and convictions ===
Glushkov had been AvtoVAZ's Finance Chief until he left his job in late 1995 and was appointed as Deputy General Director of Aeroflot on request from Yevgeny Shaposhnikov in February 1996. According to Alexander Goldfarb, he found that the airline company worked as a "cash cow to support international spying operations": 3,000 people out of the total workforce of 14,000 in Aeroflot were FSB, SVR, or GRU officers. All proceeds from ticket sales were distributed to 352 foreign bank accounts that could not be controlled by the Aeroflot administration. Glushkov closed all these accounts and channeled the money to Swiss company called Andava in Switzerland. He also sent a bill and wrote a letter to SVR director Yevgeny Primakov and FSB director Mikhail Barsukov, asking them to pay the salaries of their intelligence officers in Aeroflot in 1996. Both Glushkov and Berezovsky were the main shareholders of Andava at that time.

In 1996, a Forbes article claimed that Glushkov was convicted of theft in 1982. Glushkov and Berezovsky sued Forbes for libel in the United Kingdom, with the ruling coming down against the publisher.

Glushkov was arrested in December 2000 by Russian law enforcers and charged with channelling money through his accounting centre Andava. He was a business partner and close friend of Boris Berezovsky, who from November 2000 resided in Britain; Berezovsky had to give up his ownership of the ORT TV channel, transferred to Roman Abramovich's Sibneft) in exchange for the promise to release Glushkov, which was not fulfilled.

In April 2001, Andrey Lugovoy organised an "escape" of Glushkov from a hospital where he was kept by authorities. According to Glushkov, that was a set-up by FSB. He had no intention of escaping and "was walking in his slippers to the hospital gate to go home for the night, with his guards' knowledge, as he had done a few days earlier".

During his trial, Glushkov was incarcerated in Lefortovo Prison. He was cleared of the original fraud and money laundering charges by the court in March 2004, but found guilty of attempted escape and "abuse of authority" and sentenced to 3 years and 3 months of imprisonment. Glushkov was released in the courtroom, since he had already served his sentence in the pre-trial detention centre. The Moscow City Court rejected the verdict and returned the case for new consideration. In 2006, the Savelovsky District Court terminated the prosecution of Glushkov, and gave him a two-year suspended sentence.

=== Emigration to UK and extradition request ===
Gluskov emigrated to the UK and received political asylum in 2010. The Russian state resumed his criminal prosecution. In 2017, during a trial in absentia in Russia, Glushkov was sentenced to eight years in prison for allegedly stealing $123 million from Aeroflot. The UK refused to extradite him to Russia.

=== Death ===
On 13 March 2018, friends of Glushkov revealed that he had been found dead the night before in his home in New Malden, London. His death was initially treated by police as unexplained and came a week after the poisoning of Sergei and Yulia Skripal in Salisbury, which along with his reputation as a critic of the Putin government, was said to be the reason for putting the Counter Terrorism Command in charge of the investigation. Glushkov reportedly feared being on Putin's hit list and expected to be a likely target.

During the subsequent post-mortem his body was found to have marks consistent with strangulation on the neck. On 16 March 2018, the Metropolitan Police stated they were now treating his death as murder and that "at this stage there is nothing to suggest any link to the attempted murders in Salisbury". Counter-terrorism investigators maintain a lead role in the investigation. The Russian Embassy in London has requested a meeting with the head of Scotland Yard over its investigation into the killing.

It was reported after his death that Glushkov might have been poisoned by two Russian men five years earlier. A paramedic said that he treated Glushkov in Bristol in 2013 after he had collapsed in his room. He had been sharing drinks with two men from Moscow the night before at the Grand Hotel in Bristol and believed he had been poisoned with champagne. The paramedics found him with multiple carpet burns on his body and an unusual heart rhythm which they could not recognise.

On 9 April 2021, a coroner with the West London Coroner's Court ruled Glushkov was unlawfully killed, with evidence to suggest his death was made to look like a suicide, and injuries that "could be consistent with a neck-hold, applied from behind, and the assailant being behind the victim".
