= John Maule =

John Maule may refer to:

- Sir John Maule (barrister) (1818–1889), first Director of Public Prosecutions for England and Wales
- John Maule (MP) (1706–1781), Scottish Member of Parliament in the British House of Commons
