= Independent Reviewer of Terrorism Legislation =

Legal advisor to British Parliament

In the United Kingdom, the Independent Reviewer of Terrorism Legislation is appointed by the Home Secretary and by the Treasury for a renewable three-year term and tasked with reporting to the Home Secretary and to Parliament with an independent review on the operation of counter-terrorism law.

== Independent Reviewers ==
- Alex Carlile, Baron Carlile of Berriew (2001–2011), a barrister, former Liberal Democrat MP and member of the House of Lords.
- David Anderson (2011–2017), a barrister in private practice who later became a cross-bench peer.
- Max Hill (2017–2018), a criminal advocate well known for his experience as a prosecutor in terrorism cases.
- Jonathan Hall (2019–present; re-appointed in 2022 and extended in 2024)

Appointments to the part-time role are now made under the public appointments procedure.

== Functions ==
The Independent Reviewer must report annually to Parliament on the operation of the Terrorism Act 2000. He or she may also report (after notifying the government) on parts of the Anti-terrorism, Crime and Security Act 2001, Part I of the Terrorism Act 2006, the Counter-Terrorism Act 2008, the Terrorist Asset-Freezing etc. Act 2010, the Terrorism Prevention and Investigation Measures (TPIMs) Act 2011 and Part 1 of the Counter-Terrorism and Security Act 2015.

Further reports may be produced, at the request of the government or on the Independent Reviewer's own initiative. Past examples are the reports into the definition of terrorism (2007), Operation Pathway (2009) and Operation Gird (2011), and reports commissioned into investigatory powers (2015), the collection of bulk data by intelligence agencies (2016), the deprivation of citizenship (2016), and the practice of deportation with assurances (2017). All reports published since 2001 are available on the Independent Reviewer's website.

A 2014 article about the role, the then Independent Reviewer David Anderson wrote that "anyone who assumes that the Reviewer's function is to torment the government, or conversely to defend it, will be disappointed", adding that he has sought, like his predecessors, "only to give an informed, considered and independent view."

The Independent Reviewer has no permanent staff but has a budget for the assistance of part-time Special Advisers, and administrative help provided or paid for by the Home Office. The Senior Special Adviser has since 2011 been Emeritus Professor Clive Walker of the University of Leeds. The power to set up a Privacy and Civil Liberties Board under the direction and control of the Independent Reviewer was passed into law under the Coalition Government but has not been brought into force.

== History ==
When IRA terrorism spread to England in the mid-1970s, it was closely followed by UK-wide anti-terrorism laws and by a demand from Parliament that those laws be independently reviewed by a trusted and security-cleared person. Reviews of the Prevention of Terrorism (Temporary Provisions) Acts and the Northern Ireland (Emergency Provisions) Acts were carried out at various times between 1978 and 1984 by Lord Shackleton, Earl Jellicoe and Sir George Baker.

In 1984 an annual review was instituted, in order better to inform the annual renewal debates that were then required. As explained to the House of Lords by Home Office Minister Lord Elton, the reviewer's function was to evaluate the use made of the statutory powers relating to terrorism and to consider, for example, whether any changes needed to be drawn to the attention of Parliament. The reviewer was to have access to all relevant papers, including sensitive security information and ministerial correspondence. The reviewer would not be a judge, but needed to be "a person whose reputation would lend authority to his conclusions, because some of the information which led him to his conclusions would not be published."

Between 1984 and 2001, annual reports were produced by Sir Cyril Phillips, Viscount Colville and J.J. Rowe QC. On 11 September 2001, a few hours before the attacks on the World Trade Center in New York City, Lord Carlile of Berriew CBE QC was appointed as the Independent Reviewer of Terrorism Legislation. The role was first put on a statutory basis in relation to control orders under the Prevention of Terrorism Act 2005. Lord Carlile was influential on Government thinking both before and after the 7/7 London attacks of 2005. He held the position for more than nine years, until he was replaced by David Anderson QC on 21 February 2011.

Max Hill QC took over the post from 1 March 2017. He continued until 12 October 2018, after which he left to take up appointment as Director of Public Prosecutions. At the time of his resignation, no appointment process had been launched to find a successor. As of May 2019, Jonathan Hall QC was appointed by the Home Secretary as the new Independent Reviewer of Terrorism Legislation.

== Influence ==
The distinctiveness of the Independent Reviewer's role has been said to lie in a combination of two factors: complete independence from Government, coupled with unrestricted access to classified material. These factors in themselves are no guarantee of influence. Past recommendations of the Independent Reviewer have however often been accepted by Government, as may be seen from the academic literature and from the responses to the Independent Reviewer's reports that are published on the Reviewer's website. Other recommendations have been taken up by the courts or by parliamentary committees.

A role similar to that of the Independent Reviewer has been created in Australia, where an Independent National Security Legislation Monitor is provided for by a 2010 statute. In September 2018, the creation of a similar post was recommended by the Commission on the Future of Policing in Ireland.

As Independent Reviewer, David Anderson QC was credited by both Government and opposition front benches with significantly influencing their positions on the legislation that became the Justice and Security Act 2013. His reports and evidence to Parliament also influenced the law governing TPIMs, which was reformulated following his confidential report of September 2014 to the Prime Minister and Deputy Prime Minister, the scope of the power to stop and detain travellers under Schedule 7 to the Terrorism Act 2000, and the practice of asset-freezing. "A Question of Trust", his June 2015 report on the future of surveillance laws, had a major influence on the Government's draft Investigatory Powers Bill of November 2015, and has been described as "the turning point that policymakers have looked for and missed ever since 9/11." It was followed in August 2016 by the report of the Independent Reviewer's Bulk Powers Review, which with the help of 60 case studies examined the operational case for the bulk retention of data by MI5, MI6 and GCHQ.
