= Stephen Parkinson (lawyer) =

English lawyer (born 1957)

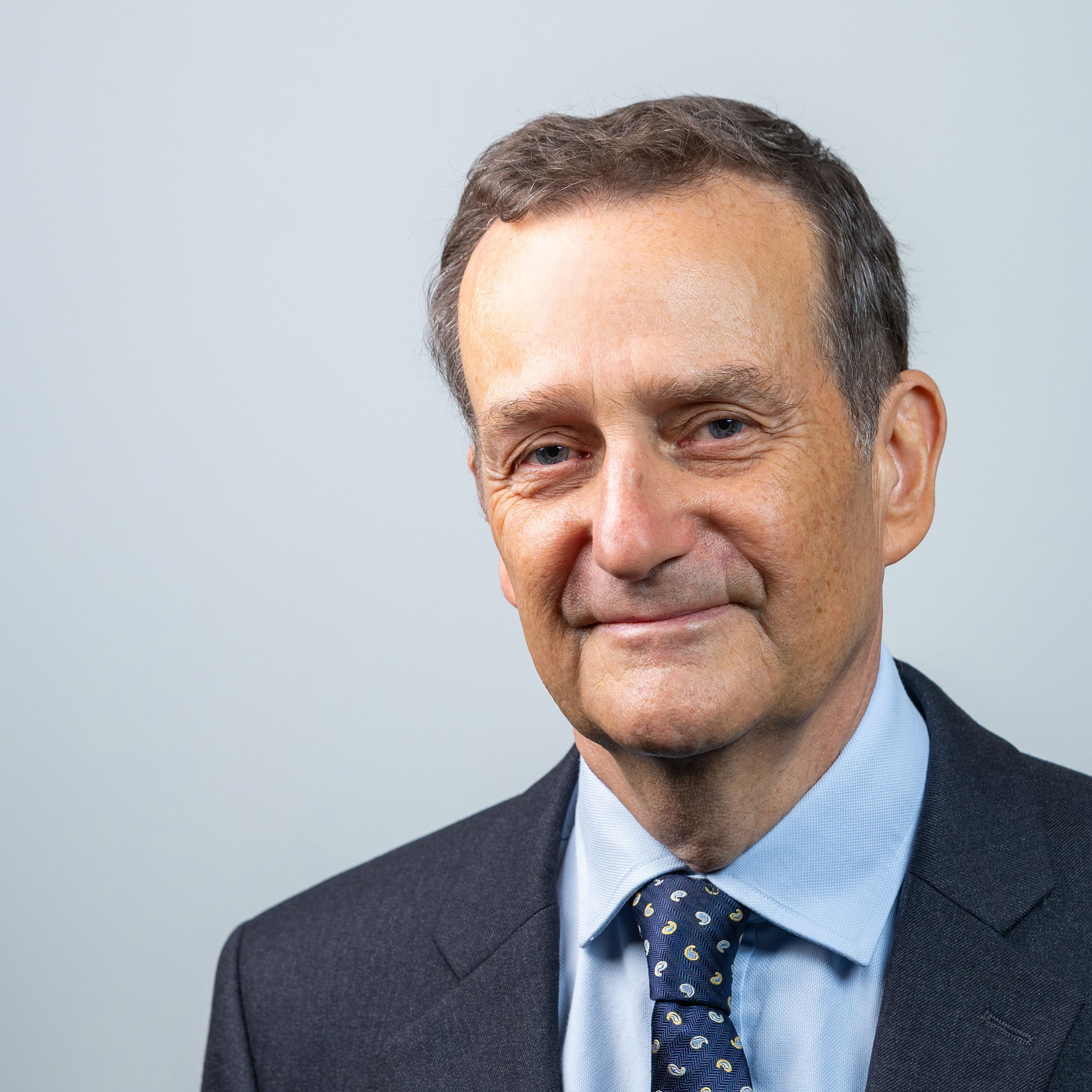
- Parkinson in 2024

Director of Public Prosecutions
- Incumbent
- Assumed office 1 November 2023
- Appointed by: Victoria Prentis
- Preceded by: Max Hill

Personal details
- Born: Stephen Lindsay Parkinson; 15 June 1957 (age 69)
- Education: University College London; Inns of Court School of Law

Stephen Lindsay Parkinson (born 15 June 1957) is an English solicitor and former barrister, who has been the Director of Public Prosecutions (England and Wales) (DPP) and head of the Crown Prosecution Service (CPS) since November 2023.

== Early life and education ==
Parkinson was born on 15 June 1957 to Edward Parkinson, an Anglican priest, and Mary Parkinson, a physician. He was educated at John Hampden Grammar School, an all-boys state grammar school in Buckinghamshire, and then at The Chippenham School, a mixed-sex comprehensive school in Wiltshire. In 1979, he took a LLB from University College London. From 1979 to 1980, he was a bar student at the Inns of Court School of Law.

== Legal career ==
In 1980, Parkinson was called to the bar at Lincoln's Inn. To complete his training as a barrister, from 1981 to 1982 he was a pupil at 3 Temple Gardens. From 1982 to 1984, he was a sub-editor at Butterworth Legal Publishers. In 1984, as a legal assistant, he joined the Crown Prosecution Service (CPS), eventually becoming a senior crown prosecutor. He was head of the CPS's International Co-operation Unit from 1991 to 1992.

From 1992 to 1996, Parkinson was assistant solicitor at the Department of Trade and Industry. From 1996 to 1999, he was head of the Company/Chancery Litigation Group at the Treasury Solicitor's Department. From 1999 to 2003, he served as deputy legal secretary to the Law Officers (i.e. deputy head) at the Attorney General's Office.

In 2003, Parkinson joined London law firm Kingsley Napley. He was admitted as a solicitor in 2005, becoming partner in the same year. From 2006 to 2018, he was head of the criminal litigation practice. In May 2018, he became the firm's senior partner. He retired in 2023 after 20 years with the firm.

In September 2023, it was announced that he would be the next Director of Public Prosecutions and head of the Crown Prosecution Service. He took up the post on 1 November 2023, succeeding Sir Max Hill. He is the first solicitor to be the DPP since the 1960s, and the first to head the CPS.

Legal offices
| Preceded by Sir Max Hill | Director of Public Prosecutions (England and Wales); 2023 to present | Incumbent |
