= Norman Skelhorn =

Sir Norman John Skelhorn, KBE, QC (10 September 1909 – 28 May 1988) was an English barrister who was Director of Public Prosecutions for England and Wales from 1964 to 1977.

== Early life and education ==
Skelhorn was born in Glossop, Derbyshire, the son of a clergyman. He was educated at Shrewsbury School. He was called to the Bar in 1931.

== Career ==
In 1963 Norman Skelhorn was asked to lead a Home Office inquiry into the Hal Woolf case concerning a British artist who died in the custody of the Met Police. In his memoirs "Public Prosecutor" published in 1981 Norman Skelhorn wrote:

"I was pleased that the evidence in the Woolf case exonerated the police from any blame for the unfortunate man’s death".

Appointed DPP in 1964, in 1965, Sir Norman presented a paper to the Commonwealth and Empire Law Conference in Sydney, titled "Crime and Punishment of Crime: Investigation of Offences and Trial of Accused Persons." In this paper, he set out his agenda. These words came back negatively when, in Rupasinghe v. Attorney General the defence counsel in this case about violation of the right to silence, used the report in contrast to Sir Norman's 1972 role as a member of the eleventh Criminal Law Revision Committee.

One of the first cases Skelhorn dealt with was the August 1966 seizure by Scotland Yard's obscene publications squad of all copies of Aubrey Beardsley's erotic cards and posters they could find in a card shop on Regent Street. After Commissioner Sir Joseph Simpson went to the Victoria and Albert Museum to inspect the originals with pubic hair on display there, the Home Secretary Roy Jenkins had to spend time dealing with the media, while Sir Norman was so deeply unimpressed by the seized drawings that he promptly ordered the police to take them back to the shop.

In 1972, Skelhorn gave bank robber Bertie Smalls, Britain's first true supergrass, immunity from prosecution in light of the amounts and detail of his Queen's evidence. Although Smalls evidence and confession consequently convicted 21 associates for a total of 302 years, the Law Lords told Skelhorn that they found the arrangement with Smalls an "unholy deal."

Skelhorn became entangled in the row that erupted around the use of torture in Northern Ireland. Edward Heath, Prime Minister since 1970, had banned sensory deprivation in light of the report by Sir Edmund Compton into internment and interrogation techniques used by the British Army and the Royal Ulster Constabulary. In October 1973, being questioned at a meeting of the Harvard Law School Forum, Sir Norman did not deny that torture had taken place. On the contrary, he stated that "when dealing with "Irish terrorists" any methods were justified."

On 9 April 1976, the leader of the Young Liberals Peter Hain was cleared of robbery at a branch of Barclays Bank. In the House of Commons that afternoon, six MPs led by Liberal David Steel, called for the resignation of Sir Norman Skelhorn, over the Hain case.

=== Retirement ===
Skelhorn retired from the post before the publication of the critical report by Lord Devlin published in 1977 recommended statutory prosecution safeguards, on which the Government took no action.

Home Secretary Merlyn Rees appointed Sir Thomas Hetherington Director of Public Prosecutions on the retirement of Sir Norman, with a brief to reduce delays in the criminal legal system. Skelhorn was an active freemason.

| Preceded by Sir Theobald Mathew | Director of Public Prosecutions; 1964–1977 | Succeeded by Sir Thomas Hetherington |
