= David Anderson, Baron Anderson of Ipswich =

British barrister and life peer (born 1961)

The Right Honourable The Lord Anderson of Ipswich KBE KC
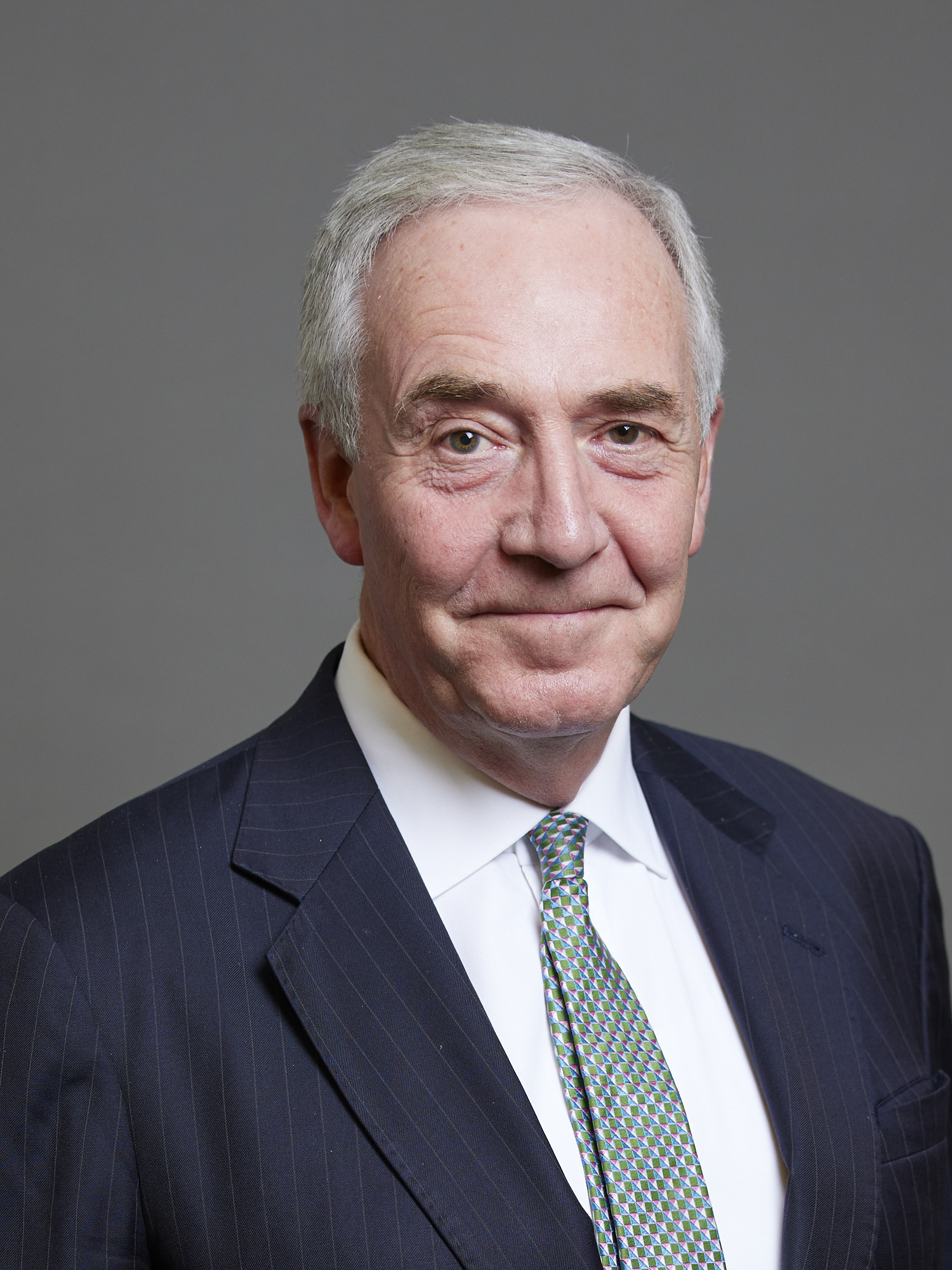
- Lord Anderson of Ipswich in 2022

Member of the House of Lords
- Lord Temporal
- Life peerage 10 July 2018

Personal details
- Born: 5 July 1961 (age 65)
- Party: Crossbench

David William Kinloch Anderson, Baron Anderson of Ipswich, KBE, KC (born 5 July 1961) is a British barrister and life peer, who was the Independent Reviewer of Terrorism Legislation in the United Kingdom between 2011 and 2017. On 8 June 2018 it was announced that he would be introduced to the House of Lords as a cross-bench (non-party) working peer. On the same day he was appointed a Knight Commander of the Order of the British Empire (KBE), for services to national security and civil liberties, in the Queen's 2018 Birthday Honours.

== Early life ==
Anderson's father was Sir Eric Anderson, former headmaster of Eton College, who taught Prince Charles (at Gordonstoun), Tony Blair (at Fettes College) and David Cameron and Boris Johnson at Eton, before moving on to Lincoln College, Oxford, where he was Rector while Rishi Sunak and Shabana Mahmood were undergraduates.

Anderson was educated at the Edinburgh Academy; the Dragon School; CES Jargeau (France); Eton College (where he was a King's Scholar); New College, Oxford (1979–82: Ancient and Modern History); Downing College, Cambridge (1982–84: Law); and the Inns of Court School of Law.

== Career ==
=== Legal practice ===
Anderson came to the English Bar after spells in Washington DC (1985–86) as a lawyer from abroad at Covington and Burling and in Brussels (1987–88) in the private office of Lord Cockfield, the European Commissioner tasked with completing the Internal Market.

As a practitioner since 1988 at Brick Court Chambers in London and King's Counsel since 1999, Anderson appeared in more than 150 cases in the Court of Justice of the European Union, including for the claimants in the landmark constitutional cases Factortame (supremacy of EU law:1988-2000) and Kadi (UN/EU terrorist sanctions: 2005–2010). Cases presented in the highest UK courts include ProLife Alliance v BBC (freedom of political speech), Friends of the Earth (Heathrow Airport's appeal in relation to its proposed third runway) and the sanctions case Shvidler. Among more than 30 cases that he has argued before the European Court of Human Rights are Bowman v UK (free speech and election spending), McGonnell v UK (separation of powers), Hatton v UK (night noise and environmental rights), Demopoulos v Turkey (Cyprus property) and Gaunt v UK (journalistic freedom of expression). Cases he has argued for UEFA include the appeal by Crystal Palace to the Court of Arbitration for Sport against its exclusion from the 2025/26 Europa League.

Anderson is a Bencher of Middle Temple. He sat as a Recorder of the Crown Court from 2004 to 2013, and from 2015 to 2024 as a Judge of the Courts of Appeal of Guernsey and Jersey, where he was also the Investigatory Powers Commissioner between 2017 and 2020. Anderson was described as the UK's "Legal Personality of the Year" in 2015, and as one of London's 1000 most influential people in 2017. He was presented with a Lifetime Achievement Award at the 2025 Chambers UK Bar Awards.

=== National security ===
Anderson succeeded Lord Carlile of Berriew CBE QC as the UK's Independent Reviewer of Terrorism Legislation in February 2011. He stepped down after two three-year terms as Independent Reviewer, and was succeeded in post by Max Hill QC on 1 March 2017. All but one of his 20 reports as Independent Reviewer were laid before Parliament and published in full.

==== Counter-terrorism law ====
Both Government and opposition credited Anderson for his influence on the Justice and Security Act 2013, which governs the use of closed material procedures in UK courts. His reports and evidence to Parliament also influenced the law governing Terrorism Prevention and Investigation Measures (TPIMs, the successors to control orders), which were reformulated in accordance with his recommendations in 2015; the scope of the power to stop and detain travellers under Schedule 7 to the Terrorism Act 2000; and the practice of asset-freezing. Other reports concerned the deprivation of citizenship and the practice of deportation with assurances.

The UK Supreme Court referred to Anderson's work with approval in R v Gul (2013) and Beghal v DPP (2015), as did the European Court of Human Rights in Beghal v UK (2019). He wrote in 2014 and 2017 on the channels by which the Independent Reviewer may hope to influence the law and policy of counter-terrorism. He delivered broader reflections on terrorism and the law in 2013 and in his Hague Lecture of 2018. He lectured on reporting terrorism in 2019.

==== Surveillance ====
"A Question of Trust", Anderson's June 2015 report of his Investigatory Powers Review, described the obscurity of the then law as "undemocratic, unnecessary and – in the long run – intolerable". Its 125 recommendations aimed to replace it with "a clear, coherent and accessible scheme, adapted to the world of internet-based communications and encryption". The report was described in an opinion piece by an editor at The Guardian as "the turning point that policymakers have looked for and missed ever since 9/11", and was a blueprint for the Investigatory Powers Act 2016. Following publication of the report, Anderson was shortlisted in 2015 by ISPA for its "Internet Hero of the Year" award.

In August 2016 followed the report of Anderson's Bulk Powers Review, incorporating 60 anonymised case studies, which examined the operational case for the bulk retention of data by MI5, MI6 and GCHQ and is a significant factual resource for debates on "mass surveillance". Both these reports were relied upon by the European Court of Human Rights in its Big Brother Watch judgments of September 2018 and May 2021. Anderson's expert evidence in the Irish High Court on police use of communications data when investigating the murder of Elaine O'Hara was relied upon by the Supreme Court in its Dwyer judgment of February 2020.

In 2023 Anderson was asked to prepare a further report on investigatory powers. His report endorsed some Home Office proposals for amendments to the Investigatory Powers Act 2016, rejected or revised others and drew attention to more fundamental changes to the investigatory powers regime that are likely to be required as a consequence of technological developments, including in artificial intelligence. Its conclusions were largely reflected in a Bill that became the Investigatory Powers (Amendment) Act 2024.

==== Counter-Extremism and Prevent ====
Anderson has criticised the UK's broad definition of terrorism. His recommendations were given limited effect in the Counter-Terrorism and Security Act 2015 and by the Court of Appeal in R (Miranda) v SSHD (2016) EWCA Civ 6. Anderson warned in September 2015 of potential dangers in the Government's proposed Counter-Extremism Bill, which was subsequently shelved. He lectured on "Extremism and the Law" in 2019, and spoke in Parliament on extremism in 2026. He has also written and broadcast on the Prevent strategy, and on human rights as an aid to the fight against terrorism and extremism. He was a member of the Expert Group advising the Counter-Extremism Commission from July 2018 to July 2019.

In February 2025, Anderson was appointed by Home Secretary Yvette Cooper as the Interim Independent Prevent Commissioner, responsible for providing an independent strategic oversight and review function for the Prevent strategy, which is designed to stop people being drawn into terrorism. He was additionally tasked with reporting on lessons learned from the Prevent histories of Ali Harbi Ali, who killed Sir David Amess MP in October 2021, and Axel Rudakubana who attacked and killed small children at a dance club in the Southport stabbings in July 2024. Anderson's July 2025 report "Lessons for Prevent" analysed the Prevent history of both killers, recorded progress and made wide-ranging recommendations for the future of the strategy. He left office in April 2026.

==== Intelligence-handling ====
On 28 June 2017, after stepping down from the post of Independent Reviewer of Terrorism Legislation, Anderson was commissioned by Home Secretary Amber Rudd to provide independent assurance of the detailed review work commissioned by MI5 and Counter-Terrorism Police into their handling of intelligence prior to the four terrorist attacks in London and Manchester between March and June 2017. His report, which appraised the numerous recommendations for operational improvements arrived at by MI5 and the police with his input, was published in December 2017, with a follow-up "stock-take" in June 2019.

=== House of Lords ===
Having applied to be a "people's peer", Anderson was nominated for a life peerage by the independent House of Lords Appointments Commission in June 2018. He was created Baron Anderson of Ipswich, of Ipswich in the County of Suffolk, on 10 July, and sits as a cross-bencher. He gave his maiden speech on 19 July 2018 in a debate on the impact of referendums on parliamentary democracy, and began to contribute on issues ranging from national security, internet safety and surveillance to EU-related and constitutional matters. He moved the amendment in July 2019 that limited the Government's scope to prorogue Parliament, and spoke and wrote against the dangers of populism and of a no-deal Brexit. On the national security front, his amendments resulted in changes to the designated area offence and to border security powers in the Counter-Terrorism and Border Security Act 2019.

In the 2019-2021 and 2021-2022 parliamentary sessions, Anderson tabled or was closely involved in amendments to Bills which became the United Kingdom Internal Market Act 2020 (removal of the clauses providing for unilateral departure from the Northern Ireland Protocol), the Overseas Operations Act 2021 (removal of presumption against prosecution of offences within the jurisdiction of the International Criminal Court), the Domestic Abuse Act 2021 (creation of a new offence of strangulation or suffocation), the Covert Human Intelligence Sources (Criminal Conduct) Act 2021 (requirement to notify criminal conduct authorisations to Judicial Commissioners; provision of access to criminal injuries compensation), the Counter-Terrorism and Sentencing Act 2021 (criteria for and maximum duration of Terrorism Prevention and Investigation Measures), the Environment Act 2021 (enlarging judicial remedies available to the Office for Environmental Protection), the Judicial Review and Courts Act 2022 (removal of presumption in favour of suspended or prospective-only quashing orders), and the Nationality and Borders Act 2022 (limitations on the power to remove citizenship without notice; introduction of judicial and administrative safeguards). He was a member from 2019 to 2020 of the EU Justice Sub-Committee of the House of Lords, and from 2020 to 2021 of the EU Security and Justice Sub-Committee. From February 2021 until 2024 he served as co-chair of the All-Party Parliamentary Group on the Rule of Law.

In the 2022-23 parliamentary session, Anderson tabled or was closely involved in amendments to Bills which became the National Security Act 2023 (rationalising the primary tier of the Foreign Influence Registration Scheme; removal of intelligence agency immunity, and limitation of a defence for armed services under the Serious Crime Act 2007); the Public Order Act 2023 (limiting and safeguarding the power to impose serious disruption prevention orders); and the Retained EU Law (Revocation and Reform) Act 2023 (seeking to reduce the scope of a broad delegated power to revoke and replace laws by statutory instrument). He opposed a government amendment to the Levelling-up and Regeneration Bill, which would have conferred a broad delegated power to regulate the discharge of nutrients into protected waterways. He served from 2023 until 2026 on the Constitution Committee of the House of Lords, where he participated in the preparation of reports on numerous Bills as well as on the appointment and removal of senior civil servants, voter identification. the governance of the Union and the Rule of Law. He served on the advisory board of the Institute for Government / Bennett Institute Review of the UK Constitution.

In the 2023-2024 parliamentary session, Anderson welcomed with minor reservations the Investigatory Powers (Amendment) Act 2024, which was based on proposals endorsed in his own report of 2023. He was a leading critic of the Safety of Rwanda (Asylum and Immigration) Act 2024:though not opposed in principle to the offshoring of asylum decisions, Anderson tabled and supported amendments that would have acknowledged the binding effect of interim measures ordered by the European Court of Human Rights, and made determinations of the safety of Rwanda reviewable in UK courts. In the same session he signed an amendment to prohibit foreign governments owning UK newspapers, which bore fruit in the Digital Markets, Competition and Consumers Act 2024, and sought to limit proposals in the Data Protection and Digital Information Bill, which fell when the 2024 General Election was called, for the indiscriminate gathering of banking data to counter social security fraud.

In 2022 and again in 2023 and 2024, Anderson tabled versions of his Public Service (Integrity and Ethics) Bill, seeking to give effect to recommendations of the Committee on Standards in Public Life. The Bill aimed to place three standards watchdogs on a statutory footing, increase the level of independence in their appointment processes and give the Independent Adviser on Ministers' Interests the power to launch investigations into potential breaches of the Ministerial Code and to report on whether breaches have occurred.

In the 2024-26 parliamentary session, Anderson chaired the Special Public Bill Committee on the Bill that became the Property (Digital Assets etc) Act 2025. He supported an expansion of the "people's peers" scheme to replace some of the departing hereditary peers. He secured a small concession on the thresholds applicable to small premises required to comply with "Martyn's Law", and an amendment to what became the Border Security, Asylum and Immigration Act 2025, putting parameters around the Home Secretary's power to impose highly restrictive conditions on visitors to the UK. In January 2026 he became a member of the Justice and Home Affairs Committee, which reported in June 2026 on integration, settlement and citizenship.

In the 2026-27 parliamentary session, Anderson was instrumental in securing amendments to the National Security (State Threats) Bill to protect the position of humanitarian organisations, conflict resolution charities and foreign correspondents who have dealings with designated bodies or obtain information from them.

Anderson has spoken and written about topics ranging from genocide, the Northern Ireland Troubles, treason and artificial intelligence to scrutiny of international agreements and the dangers of executive over-reach. He favours greater use of online procedures by the legislature and reforms to the composition of the House of Lords. In 2021 he recorded a podcast for children about the work of the House of Lords, and another for adults on the theme of "stepping outside the law". In 2024 Anderson was interviewed about his life and work on the Lord Speaker's Corner podcast. His parliamentary speeches and questions are available on TheyWorkForYou.

=== Academic and charitable interests ===
Since 2000 Anderson has at various times been a trustee or a member of the advisory/editorial board of legal and educational institutions including the Centre of European Law at the Dickson Poon School of Law, the British Association for Central and Eastern Europe, the UCL School of Slavonic and East European Studies, the Slynn Foundation, the British Institute of International and Comparative Law and the European Human Rights Law Review. He is the author of two editions of References to the European Court, the second co-written with Marie Demetriou, and of various articles in legal journals including Public Law, New Journal of European Criminal Law, the European Human Rights Law Review and the European Convention of Human Rights Law Review. He has also written for publications including The Times, The Daily Telegraph, The Evening Standard, Prospect and The House, and is an occasional book reviewer for the Literary Review. Anderson has been since 1999 a visiting professor at King's College London and is a former General Editor of the OUP's Oxford European Union Law Library. Having lectured widely on EU law and human rights in central and eastern Europe in the decade after the fall of the Berlin Wall, he was appointed between 2000 and 2004 by the secretary general of the Council of Europe to monitor and report to the Committee of Ministers on the freedom of the media in Russia, Ukraine, Georgia and Turkey.

Recent lectures, some published also in academic or professional journals, include The Fly in the China Shop, The Lords and the Law, National Security Law, Writing a Constitution, National Security and Human Rights, Parliament and the Rule of Law and The ECHR - News from London and Strasbourg.

Since July 2019 Anderson has chaired Inter Mediate, a charity founded by Jonathan Powell which works discreetly at the highest political levels to support complex negotiations and conflict resolution. Anderson also chairs the advisory board of the UCL European Institute. He is a member of the Advisory Council of Transparency International UK and the Council of the cross-party law reform charity, JUSTICE. He was elected in 2024 as an Honorary Fellow of Downing College, Cambridge, where he sits on the advisory committee of the Battcock Institute.

=== Auld Alliance Trophy ===
A native of Edinburgh, Anderson was the co-promoter, (with Patrick Caublot of Amiens Rugby Club) of the Auld Alliance Trophy. First awarded (to Scotland) in February 2018, and presented every year at the Six Nations rugby international between Scotland and France, the solid silver trophy commemorates the rugby players of both nations who lost their lives in the First World War. It bears the names of Anderson's great-great-uncle Eric Milroy (Scotland's captain in 1914, killed at Delville Wood in July 1916) and of his French counterpart, the aviator Marcel Burgun.

== Bibliography ==
- Anderson, David, References to the European Court (Sweet & Maxwell, 1995; 2nd edn. with Marie Demetriou, 2002)
- Anderson, David, A Question of Trust (HMSO, 2015)
- Anderson, David, Report of Bulk Powers Review (Cm 9326, 2016)
- Anderson, David, Compilation of writings on counter-terrorism, surveillance and extremism, 2011-2017
- Film of David Anderson QC's work from The Daily Politics, BBC2, 16 March 2016:
- Rozenberg, Joshua interview with David Anderson, Law in Action, BBC Radio 4, 3 November 2016 (Terrorism, Extremism and the Law: podcast)
- Anderson, David, Op-Ed on the Prevent strategy, Evening Standard, 15 February 2017
- Oborne, Peter, Terrorism: A History of Violence (profile of David Anderson), Middle East Eye, 17 February 2017
- Anderson, David "Understanding Prevent", BBC Radio 4, 25 July 2017 podcast
- Anderson, David, Texts of lectures &c on SSRN 2013–2024
- Anderson, David, Interview for Lord Speaker's Corner, 26 January 2024
- Anderson, David personal website (2017-)

== Arms ==
Coat of arms of David Anderson, Baron Anderson of Ipswich
Notes Granted by Joseph Morrow, Lord Lyon King of Arms, 28 November 2022. Escutcheon Argent a saltire wavy Sable fretty Or a manche in either flank Gules issuant from a mound in base Vert surmounted of a crescent Gules an oaktree Proper its foliage in chief Vert and at the fess point an open book binding and fore-edges Gules. Supporters Two oyster catchers Proper. Motto Without Fear Or Favour

Orders of precedence in the United Kingdom
Preceded by The Lord Randall of Uxbridge	Gentlemen; Baron Anderson of Ipswich	Followed by The Lord Barwell
