= Ruth Hall (activist) =

British activist

Ruth Hall is a British anti-rape activist and writer. She was a founding member of the group Women Against Rape.

== Biography ==
In the late 1970s, Hall regularly staged protests at what she thought were lenient sentences for rapists. In 1983, she threatened any MPs in the British Parliament who blocked a bill to outlaw marital rape, saying "It takes only the objection of one MP to block a bill. We will be taking note of any MP who blocks it and making sure they live to regret it."

In 1981, Hall collated evidence on rape with Judit Kertesz. This was later published as The Rapist who Pays the Rent: Evidence Submitted by Women Against Rape, Britain, to the Criminal Law Revision Committee. In 1985, she published the book Ask Any Woman: A London Inquiry into Rape and Sexual Assault.

After the results of a 2005 poll by Amnesty International UK, taken as part of its Violence Against Women campaign, found that more than a quarter of those polled found that in some instances women were responsible or partly responsible for their rape, Hall was interviewed by The Independent newspaper. She said that "the criminal justice system itself continues to be the obstacle to justice. It continues to display profound sexism. Rape happens every day, everywhere. If the police and prosecutors and judges won't do their jobs properly then we need to give them to those who will."

In 2005, Hall also contributed to the development of the National Institute for Clinical Excellence (NICE) Clinical Practice Guideline on the management of Post-traumatic stress disorder (PTSD) in adults and children in primary and secondary care.

When the Conservative-Liberal Democrat coalition government pledged to ban the identification of men accused of rape in 2010, Hall responded that the decision was an "insult" and a backlash against the rising number of rape cases being reported.
