= Thomas Hetherington =

British lawyer (1926–2007)

Major Sir Thomas Chalmers Hetherington, KCB CBE TD QC (18 September 1926 – 28 March 2007), better known as Sir Tony Hetherington, was a British barrister. He was Director of Public Prosecutions of England and Wales from 1977 to 1987, and was the first head of the Crown Prosecution Service for the year after it was founded in 1986.

== Early life ==
Hetherington was born on 18 September 1926 in Dumfriesshire, Scotland. His father was a doctor. He was educated at Rugby School. He read law at Christ Church, Oxford, graduating in 1951, and was called to the Bar in 1952 at the Inner Temple.

== Career ==
=== Military career ===
On 5 January 1947, he was granted an emergency commission into the Royal Regiment of Artillery, British Army, as a second lieutenant. He was promoted to lieutenant on 11 May 1948. He saw active service in the Middle East in the aftermath of World War II.

He continued to serve in the Territorial Army until 1967, rising to the rank of major. Battery Commander of P (7th London) Battery 254 City of London Regiment Royal Artillery (TA)

=== Legal career ===
He joined the government legal service, in the legal department of the Ministry of Pensions and National Insurance. He became part of the legal team supporting the Attorney-General and the Solicitor General in 1962. He was head of the permanent legal staff of the Law Officers from 1966 to 1976. He was appointed CBE in 1970, and became Deputy Treasury Solicitor in 1975.

The Home Secretary Merlyn Rees appointed him Director of Public Prosecutions on the retirement of Sir Norman Skelhorn in 1977, with a brief to reduce delays in the criminal legal system. Soon after taking office, he took the decision to prosecute Jeremy Thorpe, who was acquitted of plotting the murder of his former homosexual lover. Hetherington became a QC and a bencher of Inner Temple in 1978, and he was appointed KCB in 1979. In 2017, the enquiry into child abuse was told that Hetherington had untruthfully told two newspapers that his office had never received police reports of abuse by the Liberal MP, Sir Cyril Smith.

The later years of his service were dominated by wide-ranging changes to the criminal legal system in the UK. A perceived miscarriage of justice after the murder of male prostitute Maxwell Confait, and a subsequent critical report by the retired High Court judge Sir Henry Fisher in 1977, led to a Royal Commission on Criminal Procedure chaired by Sir Cyril Philips, which reported in 1981. The Royal Commission recommended changes to the investigation and prosecution of criminal offences, and that the decision to prosecute should be taken out of the hands of the police and given to an independent body in charge of Crown prosecutions. The government accepted the report. After consultation, the Police and Criminal Evidence Act 1984 (PACE) was enacted to formalise the existing Judges Rules, and the Crown Prosecution Service was created in 1986 under the terms of the Prosecution of Offences Act 1985, with Hetherington as its first head until he retired in 1987.

== Later life ==
In 1989, shortly after his retirement, he co-wrote the Hetherington-Chalmers Report with former Scottish Crown agent William Chalmers, which examined ways to prosecute suspected war criminals living in Britain for "crimes of murder, manslaughter or genocide committed in Germany and in territories occupied by German forces during the Second World War," over which British courts did not then have jurisdiction. The report followed a 15-month inquiry in which allegations against 301 suspects were investigated. The report's recommendations led two years later to the War Crimes Act 1991, which was passed over objections of the House of Lords using the Parliament Acts 1911 and 1949.

He suffered from a degenerative neurological illness in later life. He was survived by his wife, the former June Catliff, whom he married in 1953, and their four daughters.

Preceded by Sir Norman Skelhorn	Director of Public Prosecutions; 1977–1987	Succeeded by Sir Allan Green
Preceded by New creation	Head of the CPS; 1986–1987	Succeeded by Sir Allan Green
