= Alison Saunders =

British barrister

Dame Alison Saunders DCB
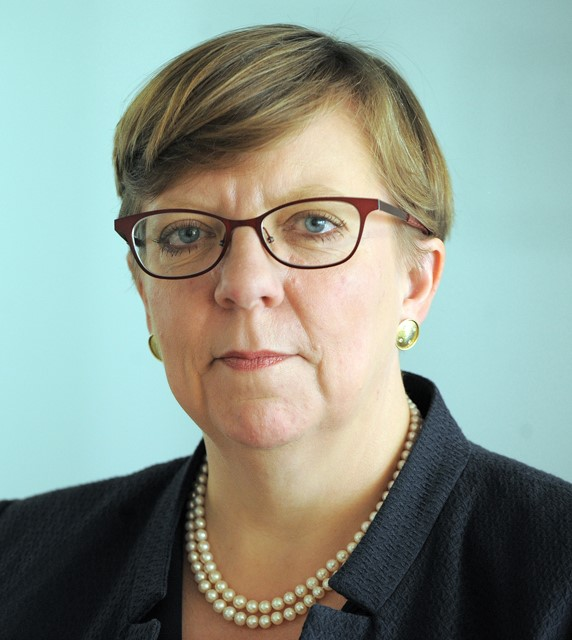
- Saunders in 2016

Director of Public Prosecutions
- In office 1 November 2013 – 31 October 2018
- Appointed by: Dominic Grieve
- Preceded by: Keir Starmer
- Succeeded by: Max Hill

Personal details
- Born: Alison Margaret Brown; 14 February 1961 (age 65) Aberdeen, Scotland
- Citizenship: United Kingdom
- Spouse: Neil Saunders
- Children: 2
- Education: University of Leeds
- Profession: Barrister
- Salary: £210,000 – £214,999 (2018)
- Awards: Dame Commander of the Order of the Bath (2013)

Dame Alison Margaret Saunders, DCB (née Brown; born 14 February 1961) is a British barrister and a former Director of Public Prosecutions. She was the first lawyer from within the Crown Prosecution Service and the second woman to hold the appointment. She was also the second holder of this office not to be a Queen's Counsel. She was previously the Chief Crown Prosecutor for CPS London. Her term of office ended on 31 October 2018. She is now a Partner at the Magic Circle law firm Linklaters.

== Early life ==
Alison Margaret Brown was born on 14 February 1961 in Aberdeen, Scotland, to Hugh Colin Brown and Margaret (Bennett) Brown. She attended primary school in Brixton, London, and then St Teilo's Church in Wales High School in Cardiff. Saunders then studied at Runshaw College in Leyland, Lancashire. She read law at the University of Leeds from 1979 to 1982. She graduated Bachelor of Laws (LLB hons).

== Career and controversy ==
Having completed her pupillage and thereby becoming a qualified barrister, Saunders began working for Lloyd's of London. She joined the newly formed CPS in 1986. In 1991, she joined the CPS policy division. She was appointed Branch Crown Prosecutor for Wood Green in 1997, and Assistant Chief Crown Prosecutor of CPS London South in 1999.

She took up the appointment of Chief Crown Prosecutor for Sussex in 2001 overseeing the case made against Roy Whiting, who was convicted of murdering Sarah Payne.

Between 2003 and 2005, she served as Deputy Legal Advisor to the Attorney General. She then became head of prosecutions for the Organised Crime division of the CPS. She was the Chief Crown Prosecutor for CPS London from 2009 until 2013. During that time, she was involved in the 2011 to 2012 retrial, and subsequent conviction, of the killers of Stephen Lawrence.

=== Director of Public Prosecutions ===
On 23 July 2013, it was announced that she would become the new Director of Public Prosecutions in succession to Sir Keir Starmer, taking up the appointment on 1 November 2013. She was the first head of the Crown Prosecution Service (CPS) to be appointed from within the service and the second woman to hold the appointment.

As the Director of Public Prosecutions, Saunders faced criticism and controversy around the handling of trials for rape and sexual assault. The CPS has been criticised for the case of Eleanor de Freitas, who killed herself after the CPS decided to take over a private prosecution brought against her by the man she accused of rape. Saunders said that the "evidence in this case was strong and having considered it in light of all of our knowledge and guidance on prosecuting sexual offences and allegedly false rape claims, it is clear there was sufficient evidence for a realistic prospect of conviction for perverting the course of justice". The Attorney General later concurred with Saunders that it was 'right for the prosecution to go ahead'. Saunders stated that the number of rape prosecutions being brought to court would increase by a third in the year 2015 and argued that this increase follows improvements in the treatment received by victims by police, courts and the CPS.

In 2014, Saunders announced that the CPS would be seeking to fight against criminals hiding assets abroad and appointed a team of six specialist lawyers to work with legal authorities overseas to recover assets from countries including Spain and the United Arab Emirates.

In April 2015, Saunders was criticized for her decision not to prosecute Greville Janner on child sexual abuse charges despite his meeting the evidential test for prosecution, citing his poor health, as well as for dropping charges against nine journalists as part of the Operation Elveden case. Saunders defended herself saying, "I'm not here to make popular decisions. I always feel under pressure to make the right decision." In June 2015, The Guardian reported that, following a review, the decision not to prosecute Lord Janner would in fact be overturned. Simon Danczuk, then MP for Rochdale, told the Guardian that "if the report is accurate, Saunders will now have to consider her position" as a result of the scrutiny that her initial decision would now be placed under. The decision marks the first time a DPP has had a major prosecuting decision reviewed and overturned. Amid calls for her resignation, she told the BBC that she would not resign. Saunders blamed failings within her department and the police for the collapse of three different police inquiries between 1991 and 2007. Theresa May (then the home secretary, later Prime Minister) said in a radio interview: “I was very concerned when I heard about this decision. It is not my decision, it is entirely a decision for the director of public prosecutions.”

In 2015, a case was brought against Saunders in the High Court. The complainant, Nikki Kenward, argued that Saunders had amended prosecution policy outside of the democratic process. Saunders released the alleged amendment in October, 2014. In it she suggested that the guidelines on assisted suicide prosecution be understood such that a doctor who is not the patient's immediate care provider, should not be as likely to face prosecution as a doctor who is the patient's immediate care provider. This prompted a backlash from anti-assisted suicide groups who argued that this was a substantial change, which would allow for businesses similar to Dignitas to operate in the UK. Saunders' defence was that she had only clarified the existing guidelines. Nevertheless, Kenward was granted the judicial review against Saunders in April, 2015. It went to the High Court in November 2015; the case against Saunders was dismissed.

In 2018, Saunders was paid a salary of between £210,000 and £214,999. On 2 April 2018, it was announced that Saunders was to stand down at the end of her term as head of the CPS. On 1 November 2018, she was succeeded as Director of Public Prosecutions by Max Hill QC.

=== Controversy ===
In June 2015, Saunders was accused by journalist Julia Hartley-Brewer of a crusade to criminalise "drunken sexual encounters". In December 2017, journalist Allison Pearson of The Daily Telegraph called for Saunders to resign following the scandal of several high-profile rape cases falling apart or convictions being overturned due to police withholding key information regarding the innocence of the accused.

Conversely, on 23 January 2018, Saunders was criticised by victims' and survivors' groups because her words could be taken to mean that silence equates to consent.

In 2015 Saunders decided to prosecute a doctor for female genital mutilation after inserting a suture to prevent bleeding after childbirth. The case was rapidly dismissed by a jury with experts deeming the prosecution "ludicrous".

After it was announced that Saunders would not be reappointed for a second term, The Daily Telegraph reported, in April 2018, that crime statistics tracking burglary, violent crime and shoplifting all rose significantly under Saunders' tenure as Director of Public Prosecutions.

On 29 December 2018, The Telegraph reported that Saunders would be "the first former head of the Crown Prosecution Service not to receive a senior honour after her tenure was marked by a series of scandals". However, Saunders was named a Dame Commander of the Order of the Bath (DCB) in the 2020 New Year Honours, and was later invested.

A week after Saunders stepped down as head of the CPS, it was announced that the CPS had agreed to a five-figure settlement with broadcaster Paul Gambaccini, who was arrested as part of Operation Yewtree and bailed repeatedly for a year over unfounded sex charges before being told he would not be charged. Samuel Armstrong, a former Conservative MP's chief of staff who was acquitted of rape, said the settlement was a "damning indictment [that] should act as the final nail in the coffin for her hopes of a damehood ... Saunders' one-woman crusade to shift the scales of justice in sex cases not only ruined the lives of dozens of young men but of Paul Gambaccini as well."

=== Later career ===
In 2019, Saunders joined the law firm Linklaters as Dispute Resolution Partner.

== Personal life ==
Saunders is married to Neil Saunders, a barrister, and has two sons.

== Honours ==
Saunders was appointed Companion of the Order of the Bath (CB) in the 2013 New Year Honours "for services to Law and Order especially after the 2011 London Riots" and Dame Commander of the Order of the Bath (DCB) in the 2020 New Year Honours for services to criminal justice.

Preceded by Sir Keir Starmer	Director of Public Prosecutions; 2013–2018	Succeeded by Max Hill QC
