= Crown Prosecution Service =

Principal public agency for criminal prosecutions in England and Wales

Agency overview
- Formed: 1 October 1986
- Type: Non-ministerial government department
- Jurisdiction: England and Wales
- Headquarters: 102 Petty France, Westminster, London, England
- Employees: 5,794 (2019/20)
- Annual budget: £592 million (2012–13)
- Minister responsible: Ellie Reeves, Attorney General for England and Wales
- Agency executives: Stephen Parkinson, Director of Public Prosecutions; Julie Lennard, Chief Operating Officer
- Website: www.cps.gov.uk

The Crown Prosecution Service (CPS) is the principal public agency for conducting criminal prosecutions in England and Wales. It is headed by the Director of Public Prosecutions.

The main responsibilities of the CPS are to provide legal advice to the police and other investigative agencies during the course of criminal investigations, to decide whether a suspect should face criminal charges following an investigation, and to conduct prosecutions both in the magistrates' courts and the Crown Court. The attorney general for England and Wales superintends the CPS's work and answers for it in Parliament. However, the attorney general does not influence the conduct of prosecutions, except when national security is an issue or for a small number of offences that require the attorney general's permission to prosecute.

All prosecution work of the CPS is performed by its in-house solicitors or barristers known as crown prosecutors or crown advocates respectively. However, there are plans to expand eligibility to become crown prosecutors for CILEX lawyers and other non-solicitors and barristers.

== History ==
Historically, prosecutions were conducted through a patchwork of different systems. For serious crimes tried at the county level, justices of the peace or the sheriff would issue a presentment to a grand jury, who would either return a "true bill" resulting in an indictment, or not. If a true bill followed presentment, the individual would be tried by a petit jury by justices of the King's Bench, Common Pleas, or Exchequer as they toured the circuits conducting the assizes. Individuals could be prosecuted upon indictment by prosecutors ranging from the attorney general or solicitor general, king's serjeants or attorneys, prosecutors instructed by the sheriff or justice of the peace. It was more likely that the attorney general or solicitor general would be involved in prosecutions of serious crimes such as high treason at the Court of King's Bench at Westminster Hall.

The second means of prosecution was by "appeal", which was when the prosecution was initiated not by presentment to a grand jury but by direct private prosecution of an interested party. An "appeal of murder" prosecuted by the widow of a murdered man was typical of this form of prosecution. Sir John Maule was appointed to be the first Director of Public Prosecutions for England and Wales in 1880, operating under the Home Office; his jurisdiction was only for decisions as to whether to prosecute in a very small number of difficult or important cases; once prosecution had been authorised, the matter was turned over to the Treasury Solicitor. Police forces, which had their own teams of in-house prosecuting lawyers, continued to be responsible for the bulk of cases, sometimes referring difficult ones to the Director.

In 1962, a royal commission recommended that police forces set up independent prosecution teams so as to avoid having the same officers investigate and prosecute a case. Technical barriers were already in place so that those prosecuting did so as private citizens, rendering them open to the range of evidential offences imposable by the court. This royal commission's recommendation was not implemented by all police forces, however, and so in 1977, another was set up, this time headed by Sir Cyril Philips. It was reported in 1981, recommending that a single unified team, the Crown Prosecution Service (CPS), be made responsible for all public prosecutions in England and Wales. The example of the procurator fiscal system in Scotland was influential in encouraging this recommendation. A white paper was released in 1983, becoming the Prosecution of Offences Act 1985, which established the CPS under the direction of the Director of Public Prosecutions, consisting of a merger of his old department with the police prosecution departments. It became operational on 1 October 1986.

In 1997, the Home Office tasked Sir Iain Glidewell to inquire into the performance of and make recommendations for the CPS. The Glidewell Report of June 1998 found that 12% of charges by police were discontinued by the CPS and that there were failures to communicate between the two. It recommended the CPS:

- focus resources more on serious crimes at the Crown Court level
- co-operate more with the police in each case
- concurring with an existing government plan, restructure the organisation into 42 regional branches, each with its own Chief Crown Prosecutor.

=== Employment tribunal claim ===
Rebecca Lawrence, who was the chief executive of the CPS from 2019 to 2023, brought a claim against the organisation for age and sex discrimination. This was settled after the first day of the tribunal in November 2023. Lawrence then announced that she was leaving the organisation, saying this was a "natural transition point for the CPS".

== Organisation ==
The CPS undertook more than 800,000 prosecutions in 2012–13, approximately 700,000 of which were in the magistrates' courts and 100,000 in the Crown Court. The conviction rate was 86% in the magistrates' courts and 80% in the Crown Court.

The Spending Review undertaken by HM Treasury in 2010 (and revised in 2013) has led to a budget decrease of almost 30% between 2010 and 2014, resulting in a restructure of the organisation and a large number of voluntary redundancies. The CPS has implemented measures such as the Core Quality Standards with the intention of maintaining and raising standards.

=== People ===
As of 2023, the CPS employs about 7,000 staff. They primarily prepare cases for internal and external advocates and liaise with police and third parties. Its approved external advocates number 2,900 solicitors and barristers, among which are specialists. Both sets of advocates include King's Counsel— concentrated externally.

Grades of staff

- Crown Advocates present cases in the Crown Court
- Senior Crown Prosecutors (also known as reviewing lawyers) provide advice to investigators, make charging decisions, and present prosecution cases in the Magistrates' Court.
- Associate Prosecutors represent the CPS in cases with guilty pleas in the magistrates' courts
- Paralegals/casework assistants provide clerical support and help with progressing cases.

=== Structure ===
Headquartered in London and York, the senior management team sets policies and handles corporate matters such as finance and communications. The Director of Public Prosecutions is assisted by the CPS Chief Executive in running the organisation.

==== CPS Areas ====
Most of its casework is dealt with by the fourteen CPS Areas, which are responsible for conducting prosecutions in specific parts of England and Wales; each area is led by a Chief Crown Prosecutor.

The areas are composed of police force areas, except in London, where the Metropolitan Police are split across two areas. They are:

- Cymru/Wales (Dyfed Powys, Gwent, North Wales, South Wales)
- East Midlands (Derbyshire, Leicestershire, Lincolnshire, Northamptonshire, Nottinghamshire)
- Eastern (Cambridgeshire, Essex, Norfolk, Suffolk)
- London North (Metropolitan)
- London South (City of London, Metropolitan)
- Mersey Cheshire (Cheshire, Merseyside)
- North East (Cleveland, Durham, Northumbria)
- North West (Cumbria, Greater Manchester, Lancashire)
- South East (Kent, Surrey, Sussex)
- South West (Avon and Somerset, Devon and Cornwall, Gloucestershire)
- Thames and Chiltern (Bedfordshire, Hertfordshire, Thames Valley)
- Wessex (Dorset, Hampshire & Isle of Wight, Wiltshire)
- West Midlands (Staffordshire, Warwickshire, West Mercia, West Midlands and British Transport Police (Note: The British Transport Police (BTP) covers the whole of Great Britain, this area deals with BTP prosecutions throughout England and Wales.))
- Yorkshire and the Humber (West Yorkshire, North Yorkshire, South Yorkshire, Humberside)

Before a review, these numbered 42 to mirror the police forces (save that CPS London dealt with both of London's territorial police forces).

==== CPS Direct ====
CPS Direct provides charging advice/authorisation by phone and electronically to police forces at all hours. Prosecutors assigned to CPS Direct are remote workers to provide support outside of normal business hours. Most charging decisions by the CPS are now made by CPS Direct, which then passes the prosecution to the appropriate CPS Area.

==== Casework Divisions ====
The Casework Divisions deal with prosecutions requiring specialist knowledge and experience:

- Special Crime and Counter-Terrorism Division – Appeals, counter-terrorism, and special crime, which includes deaths in custody, public corruption, and medical manslaughter. The division is also responsible for the Victims' Right to Review Scheme.
- Serious Economic, Organised Crime and International Directorate - This consists of the former Proceeds of Crime Unit, Specialist Fraud, and International Justice and Organised Crime Divisions

=== Oversight ===
The Attorney General oversees the work of the CPS, meeting regularly with the DPP and requesting briefings on matters of public or Parliamentary concern. The Attorney General (or their deputy, the Solicitor General) answers for the CPS's performance and conduct in Parliament. However, the Attorney General has no role in the day-to-day running of the organisation or in deciding whether a suspect should be prosecuted. The CPS is an independent prosecuting authority, and government ministers do not influence its decision-making.

The only exceptions to this rule are when a case involves matters of national security or the Attorney General must personally consent to a prosecution (e.g., all Official Secrets Act prosecutions require the Attorney General's permission to proceed). Due to the Attorney General's limited role in the CPS's casework, the use of nolle prosequi (halting of proceedings on indictment; a prerogative of the Attorney General) is now rare. Questionable incidents, such as the dropping of the case against John Bodkin Adams for what was believed to be purely political reasons, have not been repeated in modern times.

=== Inspection ===
His Majesty's Crown Prosecution Service Inspectorate (HMCPSI) is responsible for inspecting the work of the CPS. The current Chief Inspector of the CPS is Kevin McGinty. The HMCPSI is also responsible for the Serious Fraud Office. The HMCPSI is not a regulator and, as such, can only give recommendations, which are not enforceable.

== Roles and responsibilities ==
=== Pre-charge advice ===
The CPS will often provide confidential advice to investigators on the viability of a prosecution in complex or unusual cases. This includes clarifying the intent needed to commit an offence or addressing shortcomings in the available evidence.

Unlike in many other jurisdictions, the CPS has no power to order investigations or direct investigators to take action. Whether the CPS is asked for advice or a charging decision is entirely at the discretion of investigators (see § History for background on this division of responsibilities in England and Wales).

=== Charging decisions ===
The Crown Prosecution Service is responsible for charging suspects with indictable offences (e.g., murder, rape) and all other criminal offences that lie beyond the prosecutorial authority of the police. Police forces can charge suspects with less serious summary offences (e.g. common assault, criminal damage with a low value) but cannot charge suspects with indictable offences without authorisation from a crown prosecutor (except in certain emergencies).

The Code for Crown Prosecutors requires prosecutors to answer two questions in the "Full Code Test":

1. Is there sufficient evidence for a realistic prospect of conviction? In other words, is there sufficient evidence to provide a realistic prospect of conviction against each suspect on each charge? The code outlines this means that an objective, impartial, and reasonable jury or bench of magistrates or a judge hearing a case alone, properly directed and acting in accordance with the law, is more likely than not to convict the defendant of the charge alleged.
2. Is a prosecution required in the public interest?

These questions must be answered in this order; if there is insufficient evidence, the public interest in prosecuting is irrelevant. According to the code, if there is insufficient evidence to prosecute, no further action will be taken against the suspect, or the prosecutor will ask the police to carry out further inquiries to gather more evidence. When there is sufficient evidence but a prosecution is not required in the public interest, prosecutors can decide that no further action should be taken or that a caution or reprimand is a suitable alternative to prosecution.

In limited circumstances, where the Full Code Test is not met, the Threshold Test may be applied to charge a suspect. The seriousness or circumstances of the case must justify the making of an immediate charging decision, and there must be substantial grounds to object to bail. There must be a rigorous examination of the five conditions of the Threshold Test to ensure that it is only applied when necessary and that cases are not charged prematurely. All five conditions must be met before the Threshold Test can be applied. Where any of the conditions are not met, there is no need to consider any of the other conditions, as the Threshold Test cannot be applied and the suspect cannot be charged. The five conditions that must be met before a Threshold Test can be applied are as follows:

1. There are reasonable grounds to suspect that the person to be charged has committed the offense
2. Further evidence can be obtained to provide a realistic prospect of conviction
3. The seriousness of the circumstances of the case justifies the making of an immediate charging decision
4. There are continuing substantial grounds to object to bail in accordance with the Bail Act 1976, and in all the circumstances of the case, it is proper to do so
5. It is in the public interest to charge the suspect

A decision to charge under the Threshold Test must be kept under review. The prosecutor should be proactive to secure from the police the identified outstanding evidence or other material in accordance with an agreed timetable. The evidence must be regularly assessed to ensure that the charge is still appropriate and that continued objection to bail is justified. The Full Code Test must be applied as soon as the anticipated further evidence or material is received and, in any event, in Crown Court cases, usually before the formal service of the prosecution case.

=== Conducting prosecutions ===
Whether a decision to charge is taken by police or prosecutors, the CPS will conduct the case, which includes preparing the case for court hearings, disclosing material to the defence, and presenting the case in court. The CPS will be represented in court from the first hearing through to conviction/sentencing and, in some cases, appeal.

All prosecutions must be kept under continuous review and stopped if the Full Code Test (see above) is no longer satisfied or was never satisfied (i.e., the decision to charge was wrong). Mishandling of a case, such as failing to disclose evidence, can result in the courts either acquitting a defendant or quashing the conviction on appeal.

=== Appeals ===
When an appeal against conviction or sentence is lodged by a defendant, the CPS will decide whether or not to oppose the appeal after considering the grounds of appeal. If it decides to oppose, it will present relevant evidence and material to assist the appellate court.

Exceptionally, the CPS has invited defendants to appeal when it has concluded that the safety of a conviction was questionable, for example, in the case of an undercover police officer Mark Kennedy.

=== Extradition ===
The Extradition Act 2003 tasks the CPS with representing foreign states in extradition proceedings, heard at Westminster Magistrates' Court. While it acts on the foreign prosecutor's instructions, the CPS retains discretion on how the case should be prosecuted.

The Extradition Unit at CPS Headquarters deals with all cases in which the extradition of a person within England and Wales is sought by another state and all cases in which the CPS is seeking the extradition of an individual outside the European Union. The CPS Areas prepare and manage their own extradition requests under the European Arrest Warrant framework, with which the UK continues to participate in, notwithstanding Brexit.

== Attorney General's Treasury Counsel ==
Treasury Counsel are specialist advocates who prosecute many of the most serious and complex cases in the country; they are led by a "First Senior Treasury Counsel (Criminal)" and are composed of ten senior and seven junior Treasury Counsel. Treasury Counsel (Criminal) are so-named because historically they were also instructed by the Treasury Solicitor (who in earlier times was also Director of Public Prosecutions), although criminal prosecution is now overseen by the independent Crown Prosecution Service.

=== Current First Senior Treasury Counsel ===
- Tom Little KC (2024–present)

=== Former First Senior Treasury Counsel ===
- John Nutting QC (1993–1995)
- David Calvert-Smith QC (1995–1998)
- Orlando Pownell QC (1999–2002)
- Richard Horwell QC (2002–2006)
- Mark Ellison QC (2006–2008)
- Jonathan Laidlaw QC (2008–2010)
- Brian Altman QC (2011–2013)
- Richard Whittam QC (2013–2015)
- Mark Heywood QC (2015–2018)
- Duncan Penny QC (2018–2020)
- Oliver Glasgow KC (2021– 2024)

== Controversy ==
=== Julian Assange ===
The CPS faced embarrassment after it destroyed key emails relating to Julian Assange. Email exchanges between the CPS and the Swedish Prosecution Authority were deleted after CPS lawyer Paul Close retired from the CPS in 2014. According to The Guardian, the CPS "unaccountably advised the Swedes in 2010 or 2011 not to visit London to interview Assange. An interview at that time could have prevented the long-running embassy standoff." The 2011 email advised the Swedes to interview Assange "only on his surrender to Sweden and in accordance with Swedish law".

=== Sheikh Nahyan bin Mubarak Al Nahyan ===
On 30 October 2020, the Crown Prosecution Service declined to prosecute Sheikh Nahyan bin Mubarak Al Nahyan, a member of the UAE royal family, who was accused by the curator of the inaugural Hay festival in Abu Dhabi, Caitlin McNamara, of sexually assaulting her during a meeting to discuss human rights concerns. McNamara had been seeking a prosecution in the UK, but the CPS concluded that it could not prosecute Nahyan, as the alleged offence happened outside its jurisdiction.

== Heads ==
=== Director of Public Prosecutions ===
These individuals have served as the Director of Public Prosecutions since the CPS was established in 1986:

- Sir Thomas Hetherington (1986–87) (DPP since 1977; became head of CPS in 1986)
- Sir Allan Green(1987–1991)
- Dame Barbara Mills(1992–1998)
- Sir David Calvert-Smith (1998–2003)
- Ken Macdonald, Baron Macdonald of River Glaven (2003–2008)
- Sir Keir Starmer (2008 – October 2013)
- Dame Alison Saunders (November 2013 – November 2018)
- Max Hill (November 2018 – October 2023)
- Stephen Parkinson (November 2023 – present)

=== Chief Executive Officer ===
- Paul Staff (2018–2019)
- Rebecca Lawrence (2019–2023)

== In popular culture ==
- Rough Justice – about the circumstances leading to the formation of the CPS
- Crown Prosecutor – first television series to feature the CPS
- Law & Order: UK – the British remake of Law & Order, featuring Metropolitan Police detectives working with CPS prosecutors
- Silk – a BBC television series in which Maxine Peake portrays a QC, usually defending against CPS prosecutors
- Anatomy of a Scandal – a Netflix limited series in which Michelle Dockery portrays a Crown prosecutor pursuing rape charges against a member of parliament, based on the novel of the same name by Sarah Vaughan

== See also ==
- Crown Office and Procurator Fiscal Service, equivalent body in Scotland
- Public Prosecution Service for Northern Ireland
