= John Maule (barrister) =

Sir John Blossett Maule, QC (1818–1889) was a British barrister who served as the first Director of Public Prosecutions for England and Wales.

== Life ==
The second son of the Solicitor to the Treasury George Maule, Esquire, of London, Maule was educated at Westminster School and Christ Church, Oxford. He entered the Inner Temple on 13 January 1844, aged twenty-six, was called to the bar on 29 January 1847, and was appointed a Queen's Counsel in 1866.

Maule served as Recorder of Leeds from 1861 to 1880, when he was appointed as Director of Public Prosecutions. He was Treasurer of his Inn for 1881–1882, was a member of the Council of Legal Education, was knighted in December 1882, and retired as Director of Public Prosecutions in 1884.

== Notes ==
Preceded by New office	Director of Public Prosecutions; 1880–1884	Succeeded by Sir Augustus Keppel Stephenson
