= Max Hill =

British barrister (born 1963)

Sir Max Hill KCB KC
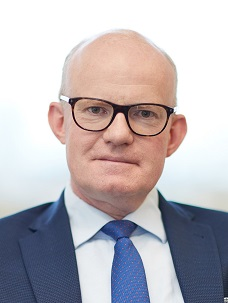
- Hill in 2018

Director of Public Prosecutions
- In office 1 November 2018 – 31 October 2023
- Appointed by: Geoffrey Cox
- Preceded by: Alison Saunders
- Succeeded by: Stephen Parkinson

Personal details
- Born: Max Benjamin Rowland Hill; 10 January 1964 (age 62) Hertfordshire, England
- Relatives: Tom Goodman-Hill (brother)
- Education: Royal Grammar School, Newcastle upon Tyne
- Alma mater: St Peter's College, Oxford

Sir Max Benjamin Rowland Hill KCB KC (born 10 January 1964) is a British barrister. He served as the Director of Public Prosecutions for England and Wales, succeeding Alison Saunders for a five-year term from 1 November 2018. Previously, he was the Independent Reviewer of Terrorism Legislation in the United Kingdom, replacing David Anderson in 2017.

== Early life ==
Hill was born in Hertfordshire in 1964. After attending state primary schools, he was educated at the Royal Grammar School, Newcastle upon Tyne due to his family moving to Northumberland. He won a scholarship to study law at St Peter's College, Oxford, from 1983 to 1986.

== Career ==
Called to the Bar by Middle Temple in 1987, Hill worked on parts of the Damilola Taylor murder trials and 7 July 2005 London bombings before being appointed a Queen's Counsel (QC) in 2008.

From 2012, he was Head of Chambers at Red Lion Chambers and chaired the Criminal Bar Association from 2011 to 2012. Hill also served as Leader of the South Eastern Circuit from 2014 to 2016.

In 2017, he appeared in Channel 4's The Trial as lead counsel for the prosecution, in which real juries, together with actual barristers and judges, tried a fictional murder case in order to explore the workings of the jury system.

From 1 March 2017 to 12 October 2018, Hill was the Independent Reviewer of Terrorism Legislation.

=== Director of Public Prosecutions ===
Hill was appointed as the Director of Public Prosecutions in November 2018. In this role, Hill supported the idea that too many children are facing adult justice, arguing that 10 is too young an age for criminal responsibility.

He was appointed Knight Commander of the Order of the Bath (KCB) in the 2024 New Year Honours for services to law and order.

Legal offices
Preceded by Alison Saunders	Director of Public Prosecutions; 2018–2023	Succeeded by Stephen Parkinson
