= West London Coroner's Court =

Coordinates: 51.47362°N 0.18563°W

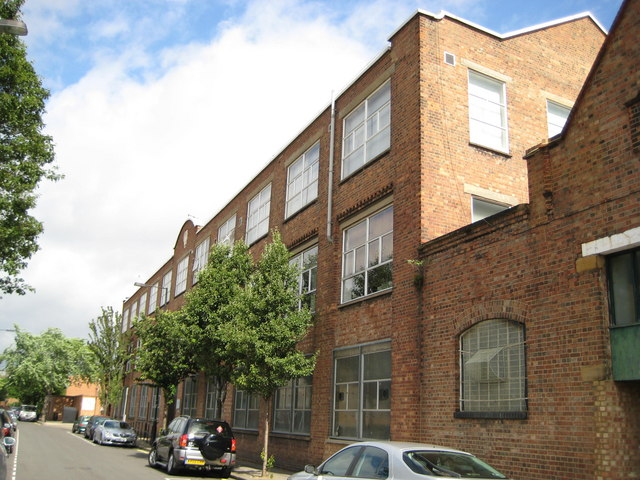
West London Coroner's Court

The Coroner's Court for west London is located at Bagleys Lane, Fulham. The court covers the London boroughs of Hillingdon, Ealing, Hounslow, Richmond, Kingston and Hammersmith & Fulham.
