= Director of Public Prosecutions (England and Wales) =

Senior legal office in England and Wales

- Logo of the Crown Prosecution Service

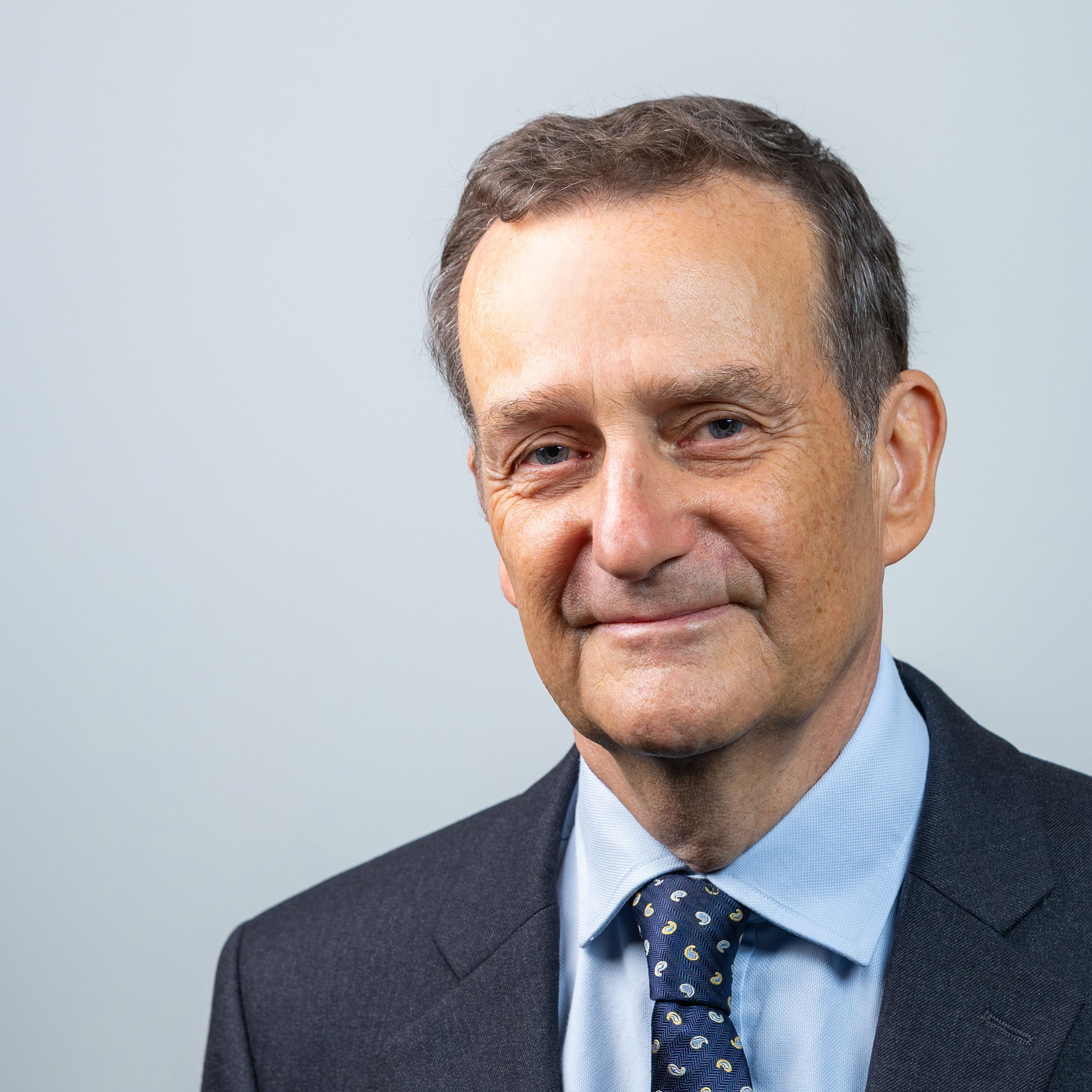
- Incumbent; Stephen Parkinson since 1 November 2023
- Crown Prosecution Service
- Style: Director
- Type: Director of Public Prosecutions
- Reports to: Attorney General for England and Wales
- Appointer: The attorney general on the recommendation of independent panels
- Constituting instrument: Prosecution of Offences Act 1879
- Formation: 3 July 1879
- First holder: John Maule
- Website: cps.gov.uk

The director of public prosecutions (DPP) is the head of the Crown Prosecution Service (CPS) and the third most senior public prosecutor in England and Wales, ranking after the attorney general and solicitor general.

First created in 1879, the office was merged with that of the Treasury Solicitor five years later, before again becoming independent in 1908. The director's department and role underwent modernisation from 1944 to 1964 under Sir Theobald Mathew QC, and further expansion with the introduction of the CPS in 1985, which came under the authority of the director. Today, the incumbent bears personal responsibility for 7,000 CPS staff and the approximately 800,000 prosecutions undertaken by it every year. The office is also considered of permanent secretary rank as per the Transparency of Lobbying, Non-party Campaigning and Trade Union Administration Act 2014.

The director reports to the attorney general, who answers for the CPS in Parliament and makes appointments to the position, in the case of vacancy, on the recommendation of panels that include the Civil Service Commission. As of November 2023, the director is Stephen Parkinson.

== History ==
A director of public prosecutions was first recommended by the Criminal Law Commission in 1845, who said that:

the duty of prosecution is usually irksome, inconvenient and burthensome; the injured party would often rather forgo the prosecution than incur expense of time, labour and money. When, therefore, the party injured is compelled by the magistrate to act as prosecutor, the duty is frequently performed unwillingly and carelessly.

The County and Borough Police Act 1856 allowed the Home Office to ask the Treasury Solicitor's Department to take on cases of particular importance, but this left many cases falling through the net. As a result, the Prosecution of Offences Act 1879 was passed, which created a director of public prosecutions (DPP) to advise the police and personally act in cases of importance; an elaboration on the 1856 Act.

The first appointee was Sir John Maule QC, who took up his post in 1880. Maule was a quiet, reserved and cautious man, who interpreted his powers in an unnecessarily restrictive way, feeling that he could do little more than send cases to the Treasury Solicitor's office, and that it was not the job of the DPP to prosecute cases. He came under harsh criticism, which reached a head in 1883 when he refused to authorise prosecution of a pair of blackmailers, who were instead prosecuted privately, convicted and given heavy sentences. As a result of the fallout, the Home Secretary William Harcourt set up a committee into "the present action and position of the Director of Public Prosecutions".

The Committee concluded that the DPP's job, in which he took no practical part in prosecutions, would be best unified into the job of the Treasury Solicitor. This was accepted, and the DPP "vanished in all but name". Successors for the rest of the century held both titles, and both jobs, thanks to the Prosecution of Offences Act 1884. The next few appointees were unimportant and uncontroversial, until Sir Charles Willie Matthews QC, a man Rozenberg describes as "the first real DPP". The Prosecution of Offences Act 1908 repealed the section of the 1884 Act that unified the DPP and Treasury Solicitor, giving Matthews an office of his own on his appointment in the same year.

The organisation remained rooted in its Victorian origins, still operating under the 1886 Prosecutions of Offences Regulations, until the appointment of Sir Theobald Mathew in 1944. The youngest man (and only solicitor) to be appointed DPP at that time, Matthews modernised the office, updating the Prosecutions of Offences Regulations, introducing trunk dialling and using dictaphones to make up for the small number of shorthand typists. He reorganised and modernised the department as a whole, and many of his modifications are still in place; for example, a provision in many new Acts of Parliament dealing with the criminal law that requires the consent of the DPP for a prosecution. At the same time he battled with the Civil Service for an increase in staff numbers, securing the appointment of three new Assistant Solicitors in the late 1950s; a large leap for a staff which had previously numbered five, excluding secretaries. The Prosecution of Offences Act 1985 created the Crown Prosecution Service (CPS) in 1986, a dedicated, nationwide prosecution service under the control of the DPP, then Sir Thomas Hetherington QC. This involved the recruitment of 3,000 new staff, which despite difficulties the DPP succeeded in doing. The CPS now handles the vast majority of prosecutions.

In 2011, the DPP was given veto power over arrest warrants following a 2009 warrant for the arrest of Tzipi Livni issued by Westminster Magistrates' Court, related to her time as foreign minister of Israel during which it was alleged that war crimes had been committed.

== List of directors ==
| Name | | Portrait | Term of office | |
|---|---|---|---|---|
| 1. | John Maule | | 1880 | 1884 |
| 2. | Augustus Stephenson (also Treasury Solicitor) | | 1884 | 1894 |
| 3. | Hamilton Cuffe, 5th Earl of Desart (also Treasury Solicitor) | | 1894 | 1908 |
| 4. | Charles Willie Matthews | | 1908 | 1920 |
| 5. | Archibald Bodkin | | 1920 | 1930 |
| 6. | Edward Tindal Atkinson | | 1930 | 1944 |
| 7. | Theobald Mathew | | 1944 | 1964 |
| 8. | Norman Skelhorn | | 1964 | 1977 |
| 9. | Thomas Hetherington (first head of CPS) | | 1977 | 1987 |
| 10. | Allan Green | | 1987 | 1992 |
| 11. | Barbara Mills | | 1992 | 1998 |
| 12. | David Calvert-Smith | | January 1998 | September 2003 |
| 13. | Ken Macdonald | | September 2003 | September 2008 |
| 14. | Keir Starmer | | 1 November 2008 | 1 November 2013 |
| 15. | Alison Saunders | | 1 November 2013 | 31 October 2018 |
| 16. | Max Hill | | 1 November 2018 | 31 October 2023 |
| 17. | Stephen Parkinson | | 1 November 2023 | Incumbent |

== Bibliography ==
- Rozenberg, Joshua (1987). The Case for the Crown: the Inside Story of the Director of Public Prosecutions. Equation Publishing. ISBN 1-85336-011-2.
