= Mary Ashford =

Mary Ashford may refer to

- Mary Ann Ashford (1787–1870), English cook and author of Life of a Licensed Victualler's Daughter
- Mary Ashford (c. 1797–1817), English murder victim in the Ashford v Thornton case
