= Mahul =

- Suburb
- Location in Mumbai, India
- Coordinates: 19°00′N 72°53′E
- Country: India
- State: Maharashtra
- District: Mumbai Suburban
- City: Mumbai

Government
  - Type: Municipal Corporation
  - Body: Brihanmumbai Municipal Corporation (MCGM)
- Time zone: UTC+5:30 (IST)
- Postal code: 400074

Mahul is a fishing village and neighbourhood in Chembur, Mumbai, located on the eastern seafront of the Mumbai Suburban district. Since 2017, Mahul has been in the news for its high levels of pollution and the dismal conditions of its 72-building slum resettlement colony. The area has come to be referred to as Mumbai's "toxic hellhole", "gas chamber", and "human dumping ground", where the poor "are sent to die".

The Mahul-Trombay belt, which includes the villages of Mahul, Ambapada and Chereshwar were sparsely populated regions, home to only a few local fishing communities and thick mangrove forests. The industrial diversification that began in the country during World War II led to a movement of the population beyond the northern suburbs of the 1930s. In 1947, the Committee on Industrial Development came to the conclusion that "Trombay [is] ... most suitable ... [because of its] proximity to the deep water jetty and [being] far removed from residential populations". This thinking guided the government's actions during the first Five Year Plan after independence, when the state owned refineries now present in the region were first established. Over the next few decades, Mahul became home to major industrial establishments such as Bharat Petroleum Corporation Ltd. (BPCL), Hindustan Petroleum Corporation Ltd. (HPCL), Tata Power, Rashtriya Chemical Fertilizers (RCF), Sea Lord Containers, Aegis Logistics, Indian Oil, Natural Oil Blending Ltd., Chemical Terminal Trombay Ltd. and Bhabha Atomic Research Centre (BARC). As a consequence, air and water quality in Mahul and surrounding villages have suffered and its biodiversity is threatened.

== Impact on environment ==
=== Biodiversity threatened ===
A 2004 survey by the Bombay Natural History Society (BNHS) had found the 10 km Mahul creek and its environs along the Arabian sea coast to be home to 149 species of birds, seven mammals, 10 reptiles, 10 fish, 28 butterflies, five crabs, 15 molluscs and two species of polychaetes. Many species of birds, the survey had noted, were 'globally threatened'. It pointed out that the Mahul creek was recipient to a variety of wastes which flowed in from Thane Creek (which the Mahul creek is connected to) and had noted that the Mahul Creek itself received a lot of "organic sewage, effluents from oil refineries, nuclear wastes from Bhabha Atomic Research Centre (BARC), and wastes from Rashtriya Chemical Fertilizers (RCF)", concluding that there was an urgent need for a detailed study to understand the impact of these on the area's flora and fauna. Other threats noted included mangrove deforestation and land-filling (reclamation) made by amending Coastal Regulation Zone rules.

Every winter (particularly November - January) the mudflats around the creek are visited by thousands of flamingos which migrate from the Rann of Kutch in Gujarat, 600 kilometres away. The 'Flamingo safari' draws ornithologists, bird watchers as well as general tourists from across the country, generating significant revenue for the Maharashtra State Mangrove Cell. 2018-2019 saw the mudflats host a record 1.2 Lakh greater and lesser flamingos, almost triple the number of the previous year. Experts attribute the increasing numbers to the large amount of organic sewage which flows in the creek, resulting in the growth of macro-benthic fauna (micro-organisms which grow in the mud) leading to an abundance of blue-green algae the flamingos can feed on.

In 2014, BNHS listed the Mahul-Sewri creek as one of its top 10 threatened Important Biodiversity Areas in the world.

=== Gas Leaks, Fires ===
Mahul is surrounded by heavy industries and Chemical factories and plants like RCF, Bharat Petroleum, Hindustan Petroleum, Tata Power, Indian Oil, ONGC and Aegis Logistics.

In 2009, 30 people fell ill after a gas leak from a chemical plant of Aegis Logistics Ltd. However, the company denied any leaks claiming this was a false complaint created by the villagers.

In 2013, there was a leak from a crude oil pipeline. This leak started in third week of October, 2013 and went unnoticed until the first week of November. CSIR-National Institute of Oceanography, Mumbai conducted a study and reported that around 12 acres of mangroves had been affected. The study also concluded that the damage done impacted the breathing roots of the mangroves and since it occurred on the surface the damage done would affect for a long time to come. The damage affected local fishermen and fisherwomen's income; cutting them down by 50%.

Mumbai Port Trust (MbPT) claimed that the leak was plugged and called it a ‘pinhole leak’ while activists estimate the leak and its damage was much larger. Suryakant Vaity, president of Vanevaale Machchi Mandal, said that the fish they catch now are stinky and during low tide, they see layers of oil over the water. In an oil spill in 2012, 30 Mahul fishermen had to stop operations for two months and they were compensated in 2013 by Bharat Petroleum Corporation Ltd. (BPCL).

On 8 August 2018, an explosion and fire at the hydrocracker unit of the Bharat Petroleum Corp Ltd (BPCL) injured 43 people or more.

In is first inception report submitted in 2018, IIT noted that the colony is too close to the Coastal Regulation Zone's demarcated High Tide Line and warns that even the "slightest change in any geomorphological event such as land subsidence or sea level rise, the high tide line can shift landwards and cover the entire built up area in this zone thereby endangering the human inhabitation".

== Mahul’s MMRDA Colony Rehabilitation Housing ==
=== Neighborhood Planning ===
The Mahul Projected Affected Persons (PAP) township, alternately known as 'Eversmile Layout' is built under the Slum Rehabilitation Authority's PAP scheme. The scheme area of the township is 16.15 Hectares. There are 17,205 tenements built in the scheme that are meant to accommodate 86,025 inhabitants. The National Building Code of India defines the maximum permissible density for low-income housing schemes as 500 tenements per hectare. Mahul township is 1,327 tenements per hectare. In most contexts, these many families do not constitute a neighborhood but a city district. The township does not have adequate infrastructure requirements to support acceptable urban life for such a large population.It is surrounded by three refineries and sixteen chemical factories, which are held to be responsible for its alarming levels of air and water pollution and the unnerving levels of morbidities of its (approx. 30,000) residents, for which it has come to be referred to variously as Mumbai's "hellhole", "toxic hell", "gas chamber" and "human dumping ground", where the poor "are sent to die".

The township was developed originally for rehabilitating hutment dwellers displaced due to the implementation of the Brihanmumbai Storm Water Disposal System (BRIMSTOWAD). As of December 2017, the township was less than 50% occupied. The MCGM is trying to rehabilitate hutment dwellers that it is evicting along the Tansa Pipleline, and is facing strong opposition from the families being relocated. People have complained about the uninhabitability of the township due to its proximity to the Bharat Petroleum (BPCL) refinery, inaccessible location (the nearest railway station, Sion, is 7.0 km away), poor neighbourhood planning, insanitary conditions, absence of social infrastructure and absence of livelihood opportunities.

The buildings also violate Urban Development Plans Formulation and Implementation guidelines, NBCI or the various other development control regulations that define the ratio between road widths, courtyards and building heights. As a result, all buildings in Mahul are deficient in terms of light and fresh air.

=== Security Concerns & Opposition ===
BPCL filed a special leave petition against the state in January 2008 to stop the constructions of the SRA building citing reasons of security concerns. This petition was also supported by the Union Ministry for Home Affairs. Ms. Vandana Kiri, then Director (VIP Security) also added that the residents themselves will not be safe as the buildings were just 80 metres away from the oil tanks. She said that, in case of explosions, evacuation would be difficult and will put the residents at extreme risk. A report by the Intelligence Bureau in 2000 also cited concerns that multi-storeyed buildings could be used for observations and sabotage sensitive installations of refineries in the area. Then Zonal Deputy Police Commissioner, Dilip Sawant, was also opposed to the construction. The three member committee appointed following BPCL's petition found that SRA had started construction without a proper security assessment. BPCL lost the case.

In 2010 and 2013, to address the security concerns, about 2000 service apartments were allotted to Mumbai police as resident quarters. Police were also given absolute authority to scrutinise people who were allotted residence in the complex and 2 police beat chowkies were to be installed at strategic points to increase security of vital installations of the refinery. BPCL was also ordered to provide extra vigilance. However, in 2018, it was reported that no police personnel had shifted there and cited various reasons for not moving there. One police constable said that there were no good schools and another said the pollution level is very high. The police department even considered combining flats and offering bigger houses but they found no takers for the flats in Mahul. The proposal for turning the spaces into training ground for police also did not materialise due to lack of availability of open grounds.

== Mahul Health Issues & Residents' Protest ==
30,000 people were relocated to the MMRDA Government colony from Powai, Ghatkopar, Chembur, Vakola and Bandra (East) due to various projects like road-widening, metro construction and moving settlements within 10 metres of major water pipelines. People are suffering from various issues, like breathing difficulties, skin irritations etc. due to the massive pollution issues seen around the chemical industrial complex. A BMC health official said that 7 out of 20 patients who come to the clinic complained about skin diseases and 70% of these were contracted after the residents had shifted to Mahul. Residents have lost their family members within years or months of moving into Mahul. There have been at least 88 deaths that have occurred in this area due to the toxic environment.

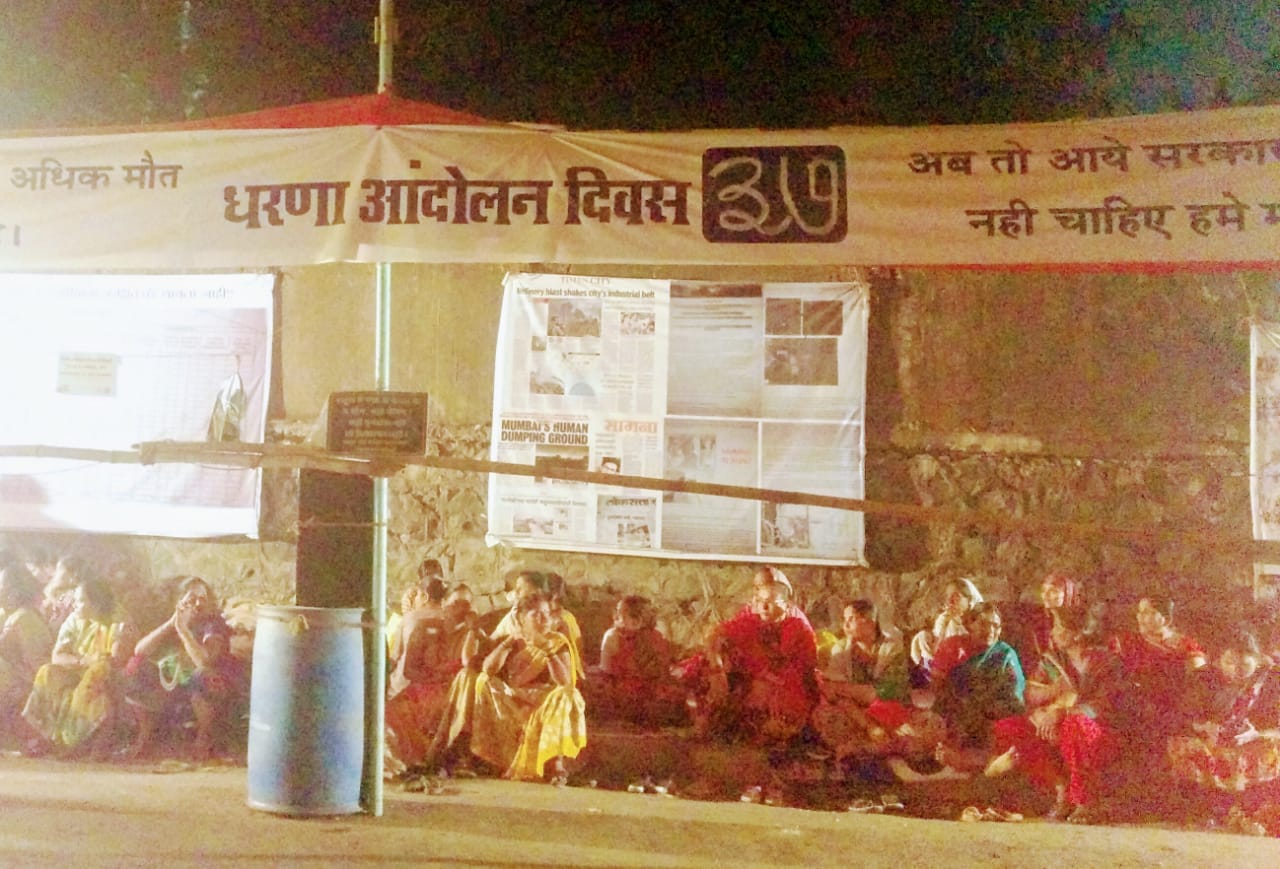
Mahul residents' sit-in protest site at Tansa Pipeline, Vidyavihar

In 2015, the National Green Tribunal (NGT) acknowledged that Mahul was highly polluted and not fit for human habitation. It also referred to the KEM Hospital Survey of respiratory morbidity of 2013 that highlighted that 67.1% of the people in Mahul and Ampabada complained of breathlessness more than 3 times in a month, eye irritation (86.6%), history of choking sensations (84.5%), frequent sneezing complaints (40.2%) and most complained being bothered by the strong smell from the factories (80.4%). Still, the Brihanmumbai Municipal Corporation (BMC) rehabilitated a 1000 families there. A report by Environment Pollution Research Centre (EPRC) of KEM Hospital confirmed that Mahul-Chembur Belt (Ambapada and Chereshwar) had high levels of toluene diisocyanate and the residents complained of symptoms that match with the listed health hazards of this chemical. This report of December, 2014 was ordered by the NGT after the residents of the area lodged a complaint of pollution with the NGT. The report also recommended that containment measures be immediately taken as toulene diisocyanate is toxic in as low as 0.5 ppm concentration. An interim report released in December 2018 by IIT has confirmed that the area is not fit for habitation as the buildings where the residents were shifted is in the direction of wind. It also reports that in an inspection of the water tank, a thin layer of oil was found on drinking water. The report corroborates the residents' complaints and earlier reports.

The NGT order of 2015 identified Sealord Containers, BPCL and HPCL to be the primary pollutants in the area.

=== Expert Reports (NEERI, KEM Hospital, IIT Bombay) ===
Under the directions of the Bombay High Court, the Urban Development Department of the Maharashtra Government had asked IIT Bombay in 2018 to carry out a study titled "Survey of various infrastructural facilities to be provided to the Mahul Project Rehabilitees". The final report, submitted by the State Government to the High Court on 8 March 2019 concluded that the State Government had no option but to shift the entire population out of Mahul. While arguing for the urgent provision of basic civic and public amenities and structural demolition of some floors and buildings to allow for better air flow and sunlight, the report admitted that they would be unlikely to address the serious problems of air and water pollution from the surrounding industrial complex. "Hospitals and healthcare facilities can treat people after they fall ill, but not prevent illnesses and diseases," the conclusion of the report said.

Regarding the health status of Mahul residents, the report contained a "list of health diseases after moving to Mahul" which mentioned skin infection (204 instances), complaints of fever cold and cough (129), complaints of body ache (72), stomach issues (56), respiratory diseases (34), blood pressure disorders (29), eye infections (25), diabetes (30) and tuberculosis (15). The findings matched with the report of Environmental Pollution Research Centre (EPRC) of KEM hospital submitted to the National Green Tribunal in 2014, which had also found residents of Chembur-Mahul belt complaining of skin and eye irritation (86.6% of residents), breathlessness (67.1%), frequent sneezing (84.5%), choking sensations in the chest (40.2%) along with frequent cough and cold and attributed it to the presence of the chemical toluene diisocyante.

The levels of toluene detected were as high as 83 microgrammes per cubic metre and the report notes that the chemical can be toxic in concentrations as low as 0.5 microgrammes per cubic metre. Asking the authorities to immediately undertaking containment measures for emission of toluene, it issues a subdued warning of a situation similar to Bhopal Gas Tragedy if the situation is allowed to deteriorate.

A joint report by MPCB (Maharashtra Pollution Control Board), CPCB (Central Pollution Control Board) and NEERI (National Environmental Engineering Research Institute), released in January 2019 (final report by February 2019) recorded alarming levels of air pollution in the form of VOCs.

=== Residents' Protests ===
Mahul Prakalpgrast Samiti, a group of local resident activists have been organising people to demand remedies from the government. The Jeevan Bahchao Andolan was also born out of the subsequent protests.

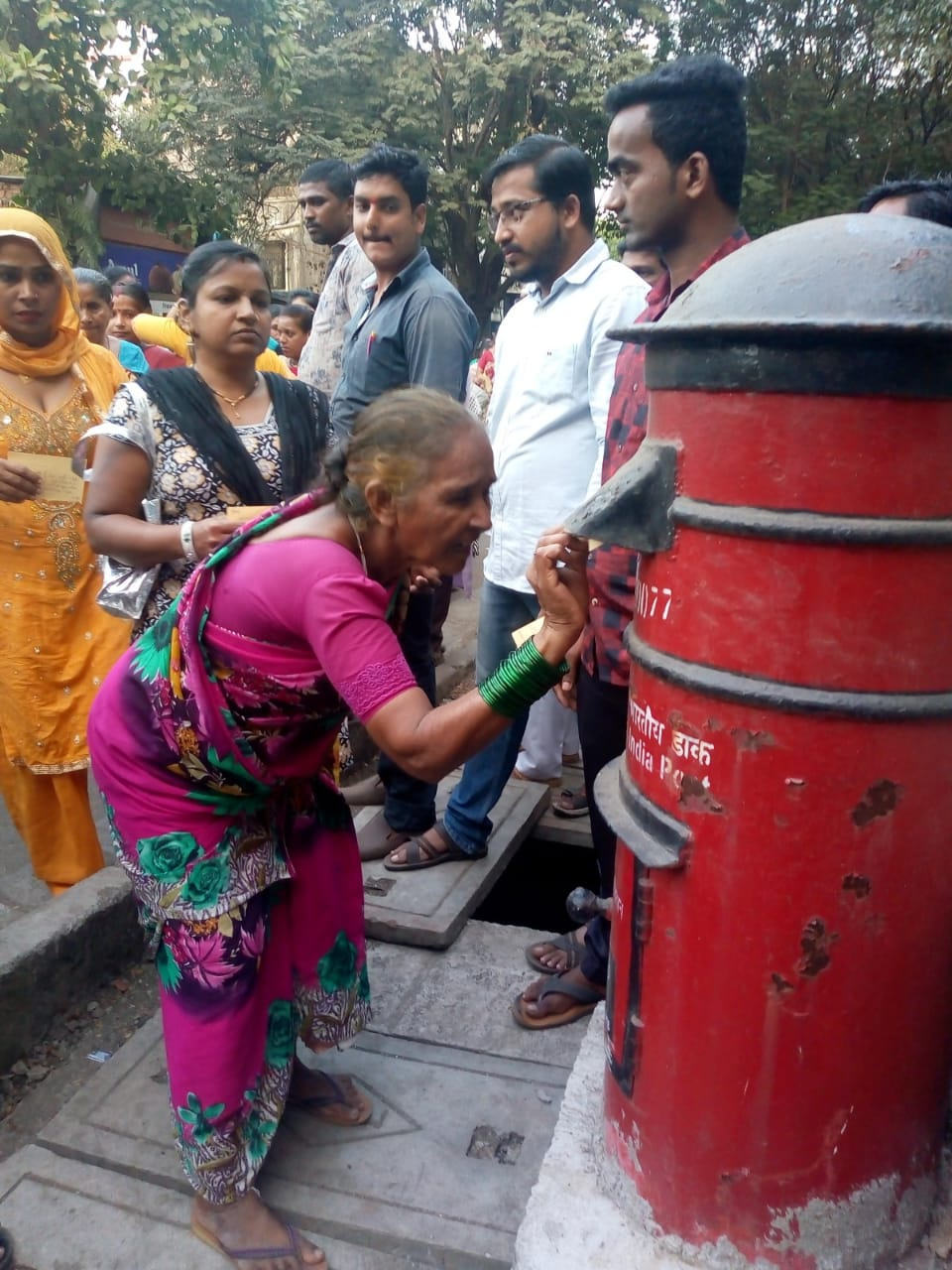
Senior Citizen at Postcard Rally, Mahul Residents Protests

On 19 August 2018, the residents staged a silent protest outside the housing minister, Prakash Mehta's house. This protest was fuelled by the explosion at the BPCL refinery (located within 60 ft of one of the MMRDA buildings) on 8 August 2018.

Since 23 October 2018, over 500 residents have been protesting at Tansa pipeline, near Vidyavihar to demand rehabilitation out of Mahul. On Diwali, the Indian festival of lights, the residents 'celebrated Black Diwali' highlighting their plight.

On 11 November 2018, more than 1000 people marched forming a human chain of approximately 3 km from Sindhuwadi Signal, Ghatkopar which ended at Prakash Mehta's home, the housing minister, demanding action for rehabilitation. The minister did not come out to meet the protesters but after the protesters refused to move, he spoke to activist Medha Patkar on the phone and fixed a meeting for 12 Nov 2018. At this meeting it was announced that a meeting with the Chief Minister will be fixed and also announced that temporary shelter will be provided at HDIL Kurla.

After over a month of the 'sit-in' protests, on 27 November 2018, Mahul residents organised a bike rally from Vidyavihar to Vidhan Bhavan. They stopped at the Mantralay to put up large postcards addressed to the government, demanding rehabilitation. A day before, the residents had sent more than 500 postcards to the Chief Minister. On the same day, in the afternoon, a meeting was held with the Chief Minister to discuss the promises made earlier. The rally was held to remind and send a strong message to the government about the continued delay in concrete action by the government.

However, since there has been no real movement from the state, Mahul residents and Medha Patkar announced on the 35th Day of the protest (1 December 2018) that if the Chief Minister does not shift the residents within 10 days then they will be marching in large numbers and protesting outside the State Secretariat Building.

Owing to no response from the state, on 15 December 2018, the protesting residents marched from Carnac Bunder to Azad Maidan to demand that the Chief Minister of Maharashtra, Devendra Fadnavis, meet the residents. The protesters continued staying at Azad Maidan till 21 December when the chief minister called for a meeting at his residence after which the protest has been shifted back to the Vidyavihar protest site.

The protesters have taken to social media bringing visibility to movement with the hashtag #MumbaisToxicHell and online petitions.

To mark 100 days of the protest, on 5 February 2019, the protesters led out a silent candle march in Vidyavihar. The march highlighted the 22 deaths that took place during the last 100 days itself. Medha Patkar announced, "I am reminding the State government that 22 people have died within 100 days and they are solely responsible. We are covering our mouths to show we have no voice because the government has become deaf to people's rights"

On 2 June 2019, on the occasion of World Environment Day, the children of the affected residents shifted to Mahul demonstrated outside Dadar Railway Terminus reminding the State Authorities and Courts that their lives are still jeopardised by living in a polluted environment and appealed for speedy rehabilitation. They chanted "Humein marne se bachao..." which translates as "Save us from dying...".

The protest continued throughout the judicial battle. 22 July 2019 marked the 271st day of the protest when Supreme Court disposed the Special Leave Petition (SLP) filed by BMC against the Bombay High Court order. Along with the continued sit-in protest at the Vidyavihar site by few residents, demonstrations were held at different points. On 13 September 2019, the residents staged a protest outside the MHADA office in Bandra in demand of the previously promised 300 houses as temporary relief for the residents who were in critical condition.

Despite the High Court order in September 2019 to BMC to relocate the families from Mahul or pay them rent, the authority had not shown any action towards this. The residents submitted 3,500 applications to BMC demanding relocation and stating that they are otherwise ready to accept the 15,000 rent with 45,000 deposit approved by the High Court.

== Judicial Decisions and State Government Response on Mahul ==
A division bench of Justice Abhay Oka and Justice Riyaz Chagla have been hearing petitions filed by the residents in the Bombay High Court.

On 8 August 2018, the bench ruled that the residents could not be forced to stay in Mahul and that the government either had to provide them safe accommodation elsewhere or provide the residents with "transit rent" - a reasonable quantum of money which would allow the families to rent houses in parts of the city more convenient to them.

On 19 December 2018, MHADA announced the decision of allotting 300 houses to the worst affected residents as temporary relief on humanitarian grounds. BMC is to pay rent for this accommodation till a solution is reached. MHADA president Uday Samant, Mayor Vishwanath Mahadeshwar and Shiv Sena MLA Mangesh Kudalkar visited Azad Maidan and spoke to the residents. The allotment is to be done on a need basis in areas like Gorai, Borivali and Dharavi.

On 21 December 2018, a Government Resolution was passed announcing the formation of a four-member committee to resolve this issue. The committee is headed by the municipal commissioner, Ajoy Mehta, the CEOs of Maharashtra Housing and Area Development Authority (MHADA) and Slum Rehabilitation Authority (SRA) and the director of the environment department. However, this move has been criticized by the residents protesting and supporters as this committee does not involve any representatives from the residents nor does it set any concrete deadline for decisions. The residents announced that the protest will continue till actual relocation does not take place as they allege that this move by the chief minister might be a tactic to buy more time instead of taking action. The Bombay High Court had already ordered the formation of such a committee earlier in the year, on 8 August 2018.

The bench reiterated its 8 August 2018 pronouncement when IIT Bombay submitted its final report on the living conditions of Mahul residents on 8 March 2019. The report had argued that the "overall quality of life" of the residents was "severely affected and extremely poor" and that to prevent further harm to the lives and livelihoods of the people, there was "no option other than to shift the entire population to safer places".

In response, the government claimed in an affidavit before the High Court that it did not have the houses to accommodate the residents but could pay a rent of Rs 843 per household per month. The judges reportedly expressed shock at the meagre figure and asked the government to recalculate the quantum of rent.

On 3 April 2019, in what was perceived as a major victory for the movement, the High Court criticised the government's inaction and directed it to deposit ₹15,000 per household every month as rent and an additional ₹45,000 per household as refundable deposit in the bank accounts of the residents and other project affected persons (PAPs). The court said in its order that every citizen had the right to live in a pollution free area according to Article 21 of the constitution and that "If rehabilitation is not done in a correct spirit then it will affect their rights guaranteed under the Indian Constitution".

Soon after on 16 May, the BMC stated its intention to move the Supreme Court against the High Court order, claiming that it did not have the required funds to compensate every family and that doing so would entitle every other Project Affected Person to monetary compensation, "which is against [the BMC's] policy".

A special leave petition (SLP) was filed in the Supreme Court by the BMC against the Bombay High Court's compensation order on 22 May. and the Supreme Court granted a stay on the judgement on 24 May. Activist Bilal Khan, working with Ghar Bachao Ghar Banao Andolan alleged that the BMC had misled the Supreme Court, submitting before the bench "old reports" rather than the more recent ones, which paint an increasingly deteriorating picture of Mahul. On 22 July 2019, the Supreme Court disposed the SLP filed by BMC and upheld the order of the Bombay High Court.

The matter was heard at the Bombay High Court again by Chief Justice Pradeep Nandrajog and Justice Bharati Dangre. On 23 September 2019, the court concluded the hearing and upheld the previous order of the same court directing immediate shifting of the affected residents or to pay rent for every household till proper rehabilitation is provided. It also restricted the government from sending anymore PAPs or slum dwellers to be shifted to Mahul owing to the continued high levels of pollution and deplorable living conditions. A period of 12 weeks was given to comply with this order.

=== Relief to residents ===
On 6 March 2020, after almost three years of struggle, 288 families received allotment in alternate homes in MHB Colony, Gorai

== During Covid-19 ==
As the pandemic hit the city, the BMC floated the idea for setting up quarantine centres in Mahul, MMRDA colonies. On 3 April 2020, a joint statement was issued and submitted to the government by doctors, lawyers, residents and activists explaining the perils of doing so given the toxic water and air quality along with the poor ventilation system of the buildings. In early May, the BMC shifted suspected and high risk residents of M-East Ward to Videocon Colony, near the MMRDA buildings, for quarantine. The conditions at the quarantine centre were appalling. An uninhabited structure, the water works were still not finished. Those quarantined languished without water in the toilets for the first 5 days.

The BMC also planned to shift the COVID-19 positive prison inmates of Arthur Road Jail, Byculla to Mahul for quarantine. A PIL was filed by the mother of an inmate, Sharda Tevar and Ghar Bachao Ghar Banao Andolan against this move. It would be counter productive to shift patients with respiratory disease to a heavily polluted place it was argued. The Bombay HC, on 15 May 2020, directed the municipal corporation to not use Mahul as quarantine centres without the court's permission and only to use it as a last resort. The division bench was presided by Chief Justice Dipankar Datta and Justice A A Sayed, who gave the judgement via videoconferencing. By end of May, the BMC appealed to the High Court to allow use of 11 buildings of MMRDA Colony, Mahul for quarantine. Chief Justice Dipankar Datta and Justice K K Tated heard the petition. In a rejoinder, Ghar Bachao Ghar Banao Andolan has argued that there have been 11 deaths due to COVID-19 in Mahul and it would not make any logical sense to shift more patients here.
