= Prosecution association =

A prosecution association was an organization of citizens, typically in the same community, who paid dues to cover one another's costs of privately prosecuting offenders should a crime be committed against them.

These were particularly popular in places and times when there was no public police force (the first public police force in Britain was established in 1829) and when citizens were allowed to prosecute offenders directly rather than relying on public prosecutors. The prosecution associations sometimes also provided crime insurance to their members, and would go after offenders in an effort to obtain restitution.

The oldest society in Northamptonshire and possibly in England that still meets annually is the Wellingborough Association for the Prosecution of Felons which was formed in 1781.
