= Murder stone =

Historic markers in the United Kingdom

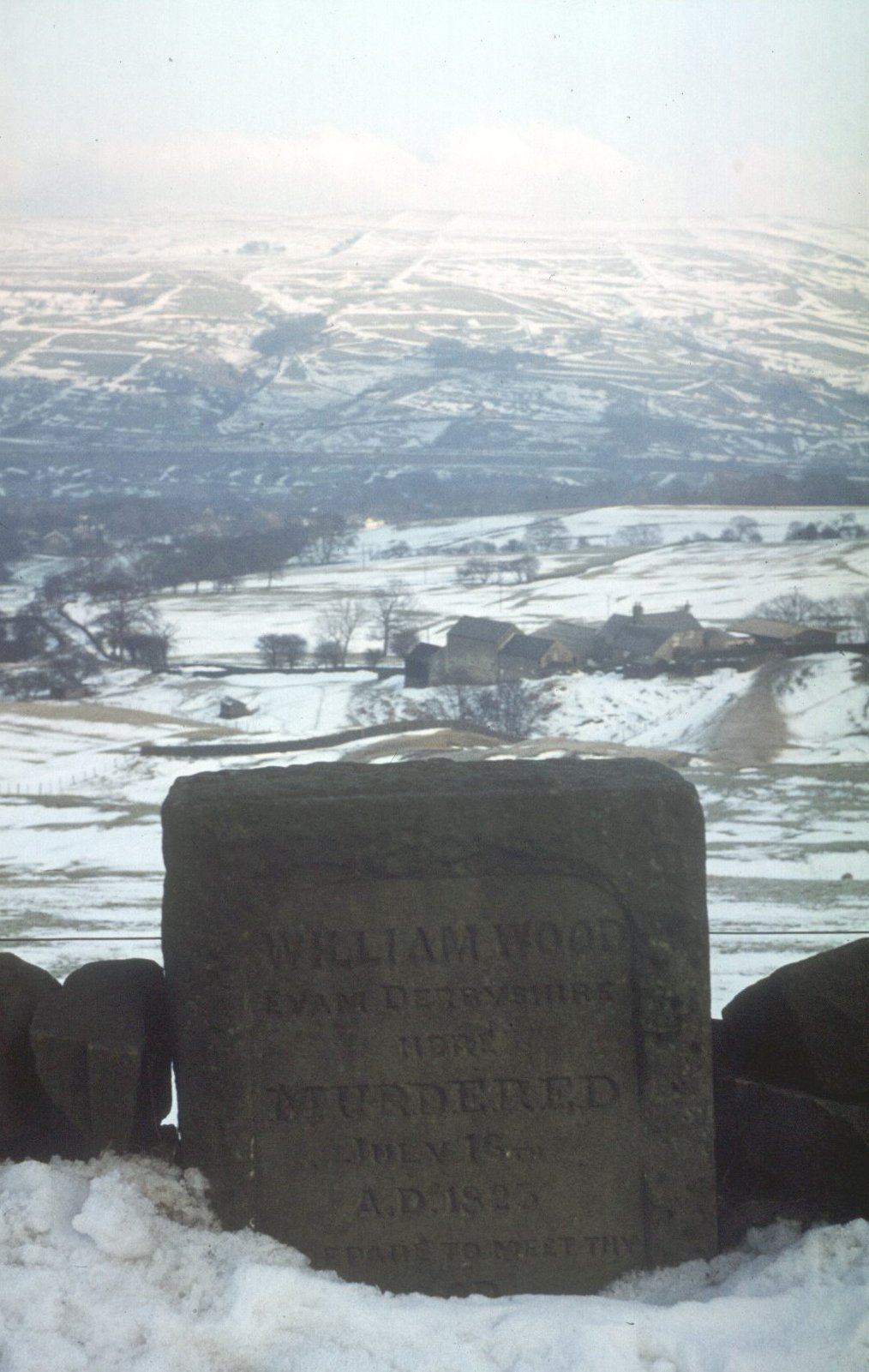
Murder stone dated 1823 near Whaley Bridge in Derbyshire

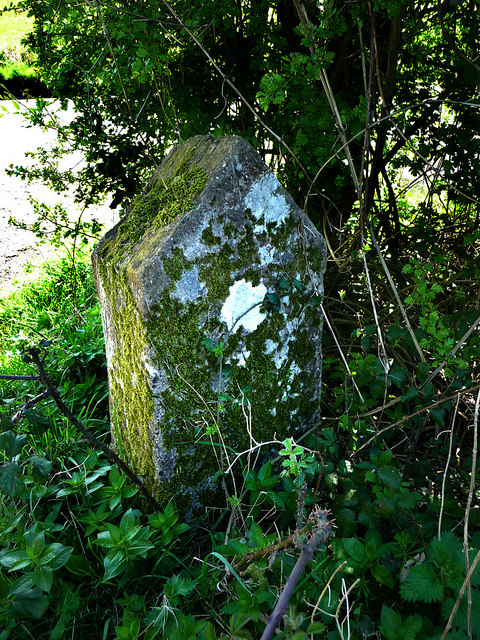
Murder stone dated 1782 near Hambledon, Hampshire

Murder stones are historic markers found in the countryside of the United Kingdom. They were most popular during the 1820s, being erected at the site of infamous murders. They mostly serve to commemorate the life of the victim or to warn of the consequences of committing such acts, while at least one warns women to take more care to avoid becoming a victim. Many of the stones are now regarded as local landmarks and some have been granted protection as listed structures.

== Description ==
Murder stones are engraved stone monuments placed at or nearby the scene of a murder, often where crimes had caused particular shock or outrage within a community. The majority of stones known today were erected within a hundred year period, with the majority placed in the 1820s. One stone, a rough-cut boulder with the simple inscription "murder", near Ardwell in Scotland is traditionally dated to 1551 and associated with the murder of the Laird of Castle Clanyard by a member of Clan McCulloch though historians believe that it too is of 19th-century origin. All of the stones known today are in countryside areas, with none in cities. They are relatively widespread in England but only a handful are known in Wales, one being at Cadoxton, and the Ardwell stone is the only one documented in Scotland.

Most stones mark the scene of crimes where the perpetrator was detected and brought to justice, but some mark unsolved killings. They seem to have been erected by prominent local people; religious leaders, landowners and justices of the peace are among those known to have commissioned murder stones. Their purpose varies with many simply commemorating the life of the victim. Others warn unknown perpetrators or those who might consider similar crimes of the consequences of their actions, whether at the hands of the courts or by divine judgement. The stone at Cadoxton is said to have been placed to face the house of the chief suspect for the crime, who was not brought to justice, and warned, "Although the savage murderer escaped for a season the detection of man yet God hath set his mark upon him either for time or eternity, and the cry of blood will assuredly pursue him to certain and terrible righteous judgement". One at Akebar in North Yorkshire simply carries the date of the killing and the words "do no murder". Another stone, dated 1817, lays part of the blame with the female victim for having "incautiously repaired to a scene of amusement, without proper protection".

== Legacy ==
Many of the stones are now local landmarks and some have been granted the protection of a listed structure. One of the more famous stones is that to the Unknown Sailor, an unidentified man murdered at Hindhead in Surrey in 1786. The stone was mentioned by Charles Dickens in his 1838–39 work The Life and Adventures of Nicholas Nickleby. Dickens has the principal character of his work come across the stone at the Devil's Punch Bowl during his journey to London.
