= Special Leave Petitions in India =

Power of the Supreme Court of India

In India, Special Leave Petitions (SLP) holds a prime place in the Judiciary of India, and has been provided as a residual power in the hands of Supreme Court of India to be exercised only in cases when any substantial question of law is involved, or gross injustice has been done. It provides the aggrieved party a special permission to be heard in apex court in appeal against any judgment or order of any court/tribunal in the territory of India, except military tribunal and court martial.

The Constitution of India under Article 136 vests the Supreme Court of India, the apex court of the country, with a special power to grant special leave, to appeal against any judgment or order or decree in any matter or cause, passed or made by any Court/tribunal in the territory of India. It is to be used in case any substantial constitutional question of law is involved, or gross injustice has been done.

It is discretionary power vested in the Supreme Court of India and the court may in its discretion refuse to grant leave to appeal. The aggrieved party cannot claim special leave to appeal under Article 136 as a right, but it is privilege vested in the Supreme Court of India to grant leave to appeal or not.

== Restrictions ==
SLP can be filed against any judgment or decree or order of any High Court /tribunal in the territory of India; or, SLP can be filed in case the High court refuses to grant the certificate of fitness for appeal to Supreme Court of India.

SLP can be filed against any judgment of High Court within 90 days from the date of judgement; or SLP can be filed within 60 days against the order of the High Court refusing to grant the certificate of fitness for appeal to Supreme Court.

Any aggrieved party can file SLP against the judgment or order of refusal of grant of certificate.

Refusal of a certificate of appeal by the High Court indicates that the case is not considered fit for appeal under constitutional provisions. However, the aggrieved party may still approach the Supreme Court by filing a Special Leave Petition under Article 136. The Supreme Court is not bound by the High Court’s view and may independently grant leave, subject to the limitation period of about 60 days.

This petition is required to state all the facts that are necessary to enable the court to determine whether SLP ought to be granted or not. It is required to be signed by Advocate on record. The petition should also contain statement that the petitioner has not filed any other petition in the High court. It should be accompanied by a certified copy of judgement appealed against and an affidavit by the petitioner verifying the same and should also be accompanied by all the documents that formed part of pleading in Lower court.

== The scope of power vested with the Supreme Court of India under Article 136 ==
The constitution of India vest "discretionary power" in the Supreme Court of India. The Supreme Court of India may in its discretion be able to grant special leave to appeal from any judgment or decree or order in any matter or cause made or passed by any Court/tribunal in the territory of India. The Supreme Court of India may also refuse to grant the leave to appeal by exercising its discretion.

An aggrieved party from the judgment or decree of high court cannot claim special leave to appeal as a right but it is privilege which the Supreme Court of India is vested with and this leave to appeal can be granted by it only.

An aggrieved party can approach the Apex Court under Article 136 in case any constitutional or legal issue exists and which can be clarified by the Supreme Court of India. This can be heard as civil or Criminal appeal as the case may be.

== Judgments of various Courts of India on SLP ==
There is catena of judgments mentioning about the scope of power of Supreme Court under Article 136, the maintainability of special leave petitions. The below mentioned are some of prominent judgments mentioning about SLP.

- Pritam Singh v. the State [AIR 1950 SC 169]
- Kunhayammed vs. State of Kerala (2000) 245 ITR 360 (SC)
- Smt. Tej Kumari vs. CIT (2001) 247 ITR 210
- N. Suriyakala Vs. A. Mohan doss and Others (2007) 9 SCC 196
- Tirupati Balaji Developers Pvt. Ltd. Vs. State of Bihar AIR 2004 SC 2351,
- Jamshed Hormusji Wadia Vs. Board of Trustees, Port of Mumbai AIR 2004 SC 1815
- Mathai @ Joby v. George ( (2010) 4SCC 358)
- Columbia Sportswear Company v. Directorate of Income Tax (judgment of Supreme Court of India in SLP no 31543 of 2011)
- Jacob Matthew vs State of Punjab (2005) 6 SCC 1
- VISHAL ASHOK THORAT vs. RAJESH SHRIRAMBAPU FATE (2018
