= Ashford v Thornton =

1818 English legal case upholding trial by battle

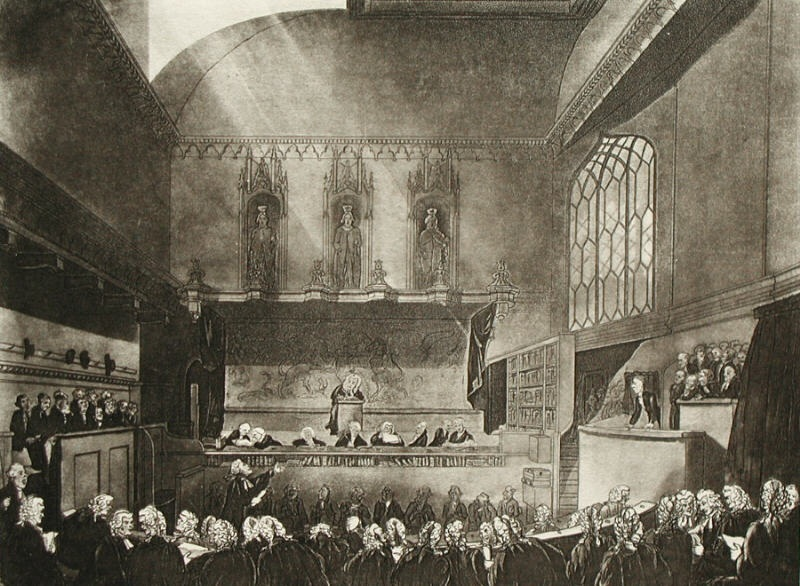
- The Court of King's Bench, circa 1808
- Court: Court of King's Bench
- Full case name: William Ashford v Abraham Thornton
- Decided: 16 April 1818
- Citations: (1818) 1 B. & Ald. 405, 106 ER 149 at 457

Case history
- Prior actions: Acquittal of Thornton on charges of murder and rape (R v Thornton, Warwick Assizes, 8 August 1817)
- Subsequent actions: On 20 April 1818, Ashford indicated that he sought no further proceedings, and Thornton went free.

Court membership
- Judges sitting: Lord Ellenborough (Lord Chief Justice), John Bayley, Charles Abbott, George Holroyd

Case opinions
- All judges gave opinions upholding the defendant's right to wage battle.

Keywords
- Trial by battle

Ashford v Thornton (1818) 106 ER 149 is an English criminal case in the Court of King's Bench which upheld the right of the defendant to trial by battle on a private appeal from an acquittal for murder.

In 1817, Abraham Thornton was charged with the murder of Mary Ashford. Thornton had met Ashford at a dance and had walked with her from the event. The next morning, she was found drowned in a pit with little evidence of violence. Public opinion was heavily against Thornton, but the jury quickly acquitted him of both murder and rape.

Mary's brother William Ashford launched an appeal, and Thornton was rearrested. Thornton claimed the right to trial by battle, a medieval usage that had never been abolished by Parliament. Ashford argued that the evidence against Thornton was overwhelming and that he was thus ineligible to wage battle.

The court decided that the evidence against Thornton was not overwhelming, and that therefore trial by battle was a permissible option under law. William Ashford declined the offer of battle, however, and Thornton was freed from custody in April 1818. Appeals such as Ashford's were abolished by statute in 1819, and with them the right to trial by battle.

== Background ==
=== Legal ===
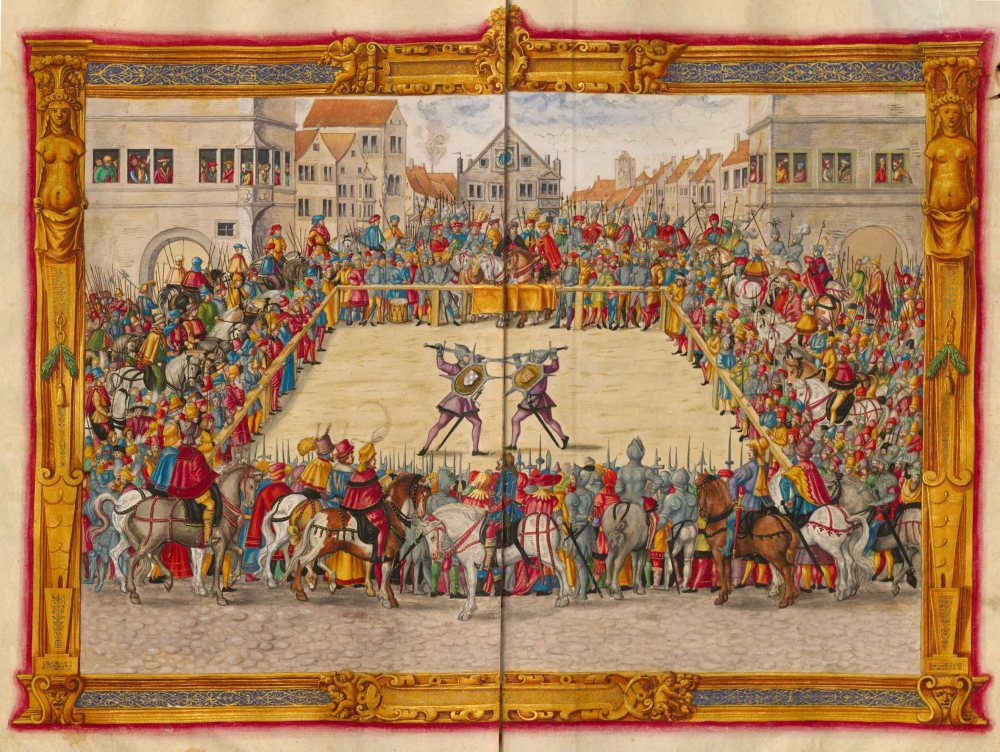
1544 illustration of a 1409 trial by battle in Augsburg, Germany

Trial by battle was a procedure which had been brought to Britain by the Normans; it was not present in Saxon law. It was authorised in "appeals of murder", retrials by private prosecution following an acquittal for murder. If the deceased's next of kin requested such a retrial, the defendant could respond with the "wager of battle", requiring the plaintiff to settle the matter by combat with the outcome to be ordained by God. Such an offer of battle could also take place following an acquittal for treason or another felony. Appeals of murder were uncommon, had to be brought within a year and a day of the death, and were generally tried by jury. An appeal of murder was brought in Dublin in O'Reilly v Clancy in 1815, three years before Ashford v Thornton, and the defendant demanded the wager of battle. Chief Judge William Downes (later Lord Downes) asked:

Can it be possible that this "wager of battle" is being seriously insisted on? Am I to understand that this monstrous proposition as being propounded by the bar—that we, the judges of the Court of King's Bench—the recognized conservators of the public peace, are to become not merely the spectators, but the abettors of a mortal combat? Is that what you require of us?

No combat took place in Ireland; Clancy agreed to plead guilty and was transported for life.

It is uncertain when the last trial by battle actually took place in Britain. Some references speak of such a trial being held in 1631, but records indicate that King Charles I intervened to prevent the battle. A 1638 case is less clear; while no surviving record details the outcome of the case, the King again stepped in and judges acted to delay proceedings, and no contemporaneous account says the trial by battle actually took place. The last verified judicial battle in Britain was in Scotland in 1597, when Adam Bruntfield accused James Carmichael of murder and then killed him in battle. The last one in England occurred in 1446 when a servant accused his master of treason. The master drank much wine before the battle and was slain by the servant.

The wager of battle was not always available to the defendant in an appeal of murder. The defendant could not make the challenge if he was taken in the mainour (in the act of committing his crime), if he attempted to escape from prison, or if there was such strong evidence of guilt that there could be no effective denial. Similarly, a female plaintiff could decline the challenge, as could a plaintiff above 60 years of age, a minor plaintiff, or one who was lame or blind. Peers of the realm, priests, and citizens of the City of London could also decline the challenge to battle. In any of these cases, the trial's outcome would be determined by a jury. If the battle took place, it would occur in judicial lists, 60 feet (18 m) square, after taking oaths against witchcraft and sorcery. If the defendant was defeated but still alive, he was to be hanged on the spot; not even the King could pardon him from the divine judgment against him. He would go free, however, if he defeated his opponent or if he fended him off from sunrise to sunset. If the plaintiff said the word craven ("I am vanquished") and gave up the fight, he was to be declared infamous, deprived of the privileges of a freeman, and held liable for damages to his opponent.

Proposals were made in the 17th and 18th centuries to abolish trial by battle, but they were unsuccessful. In 1774, Parliament considered a bill which would have abolished appeals of murder and trials by battle in the American colonies as part of the legislative response to the Boston Tea Party. It was successfully opposed by MP John Dunning, who called the appeal of murder "that great pillar of the Constitution". Writer and MP Edmund Burke supported the abolition, calling the appeal and wager "superstitious and barbarous to the last degree".

=== Death of Mary Ashford ===
Maps of the place where the body was found, and surrounding areas; the location of the fatal pit is now 152 Penns Lane, Sutton Coldfield

Mary Ashford was about 20 years old, working as a general servant and housekeeper to her uncle who was a farmer at Langley Heath, Warwickshire, between Birmingham and Sutton Coldfield. Her father was a gardener near Erdington. She worked as usual on 26 May 1817 and planned to attend a party that evening at The Three Tuns, a public house more commonly known as the Tyburn House. The party was an "annual club-feast and dance" which attracted a large attendance. She met her friend Hannah Cox, left her work clothes at Cox's house in Erdington (after having obtained nicer clothes from her mother's house in the same village), and journeyed to the Tyburn House, arriving there at 7:30 to find the dancing already begun.

Among those attending at the Tyburn House was Abraham Thornton, the son of a builder from Castle Bromwich. He was about 24 years old and heavyset; descriptions of him range from "well-looking young fellow" to "of repulsive appearance". When he saw Ashford, he asked someone who she was; that person later alleged that Thornton stated that he had been intimate with her sister three times, and would also be intimate with Mary Ashford or die for it. Thornton later denied this statement, which was a major source of the public animus towards him following his arrest. During the course of the evening, he was very attentive to her, and she appeared to enjoy his company.

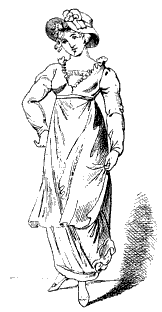
Mary Ashford, depicted in her dancing dress

At about 11 p.m., Cox began urging Ashford to leave. When they did, it was with Thornton, who accompanied Ashford closely, while Cox walked behind them. Instead of returning to Erdington, Ashford announced that she would go to her grandfather's house, stating that it was closer to work. This was true, but it ignored the fact that she would have to return to Erdington to obtain her working clothes in the morning. Cox journeyed to Erdington, while Ashford and Thornton went off together. At about 2:45, a labourer saw Thornton leaving a friend's house with a woman; he greeted Thornton, but the woman held her head down. Just before 4 a.m., Cox was awakened by Ashford seeking her working clothes. Ashford changed and hurried off, stating that she needed to be home before her uncle left for market. A reveller returning from Tyburn House saw her walking quickly; he was the last person known to see her alive.

At around 6 a.m., a passing labourer saw women's items near a water-filled pit. One of the items was a woman's shoe with blood on it. He raised the alarm, then he and others used a rake to find Mary Ashford's body in the pit. Two workers from a nearby factory found a series of footprints on the newly harrowed field near the pit, showing that a man and a woman had travelled together almost up to the pit, and that the man returned alone. The local mill owner went to Tyburn House to discover who had left the party with Ashford. Daniel Clarke, the landlord, began to ride towards Castle Bromwich to locate Thornton, and encountered him almost at once. He told Thornton of Ashford's death, and Thornton stated that he was with her until 4 a.m., and he went with Clarke to Tyburn.

Assistant constable Thomas Dales from Birmingham interrogated Thornton, and soon arrested him. However, Dales did not keep any notes and later proved unable to remember much of what the prisoner told him. Thornton was then examined by magistrate William Bedford, who ordered him to be searched. The search revealed that Thornton was wearing underclothing with bloodstains, and Thornton admitted having sexual intercourse with Ashford the previous night. The prisoner's shoes were removed, and the factory workers compared them with the footprints in the field; they testified at trial that they matched. A post-mortem examination revealed that Ashford died from drowning, and that the only marks on her body were two lacerations in the genital area. The examination concluded that she had been a virgin prior to the sexual act which caused the bleeding. She was menstruating at the time of her death.

== Trial ==
An inquest was held on 30 May 1817, and was presided over by Francis Hacket, a Warwickshire magistrate who by virtue of his position as Warden of Sutton Coldfield was coroner ex officio. Thornton attended in custody, and was permitted to cross-examine witnesses through his solicitor. At the end of the proceedings, a verdict of "Wilful Murder" was returned, and Thornton was committed for trial at the next assizes in Warwick on the Coroner's Warrant. Thornton was held in the county jail pending the trial.

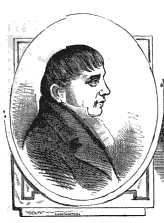
Contemporary depiction of Abraham Thornton

Local opinion was heavily against Thornton. Pamphlets were sold purporting to show Thornton's guilt, and poems were composed with the same theme. The defendant's solicitor complained of these, alleging it made it hard to find an unbiased jury. On 8 August 1817, people filled the street in front of County Hall in Warwick, where the trial was to take place. When the judge, Sir George Sowley Holroyd (a justice of the Court of King's Bench) began proceedings at 8 a.m., people rushed to fill the available seating, and the public benches remained full throughout the one-day trial. Because of the nature of the evidence, women were not permitted to witness the trial.

The prosecution's theory of the case, as told in its opening statement to the jury, was that Thornton, having failed in his attempt to seduce Ashford, lay in wait for her in the field near the pit. He knew she would have to cross the field on her return from Erdington. On perceiving him, she attempted to elude him, but he caught her and got her to accompany him into the next field. There, he threw her down and ravished her. The post-mortem showed that she had not eaten in 24 hours, and according to the prosecuting counsel, she was unable to resist and fainted. Fearing the consequences were he to be caught with an unconscious woman whom he had treated in such a manner, Thornton threw her into the pit, where she drowned. At that time, defence counsel were not permitted to address the jury, and the matter proceeded with the prosecution's case.

A number of witnesses, including Hannah Cox, testified to the events of the evening of 26 May and of the following morning. The first witnesses to attract significant cross-examination by William Reader, Thornton's barrister, were the two factory workers, William Lavell and Joseph Bird, who had matched Thornton's shoes to the footprints in the harrowed field. Under cross-examination, both admitted that it had rained heavily between the time the footprints were made and the time they attempted to match the prints. Constable Dales told the jury that Thornton admitted having sex with Ashford before he was searched: that is, before his bloodstained clothing came to light. Mr Freer, a Birmingham surgeon who conducted the post-mortem, testified as to its results, and stated that except for the vaginal lacerations, there were no signs of violence on Ashford's person, and that those cuts could have been caused by consensual sexual relations. Freer's testimony concluded the prosecution's case, and as the defendant declined to exercise his right to himself make a statement to the court, the defence began calling witnesses.

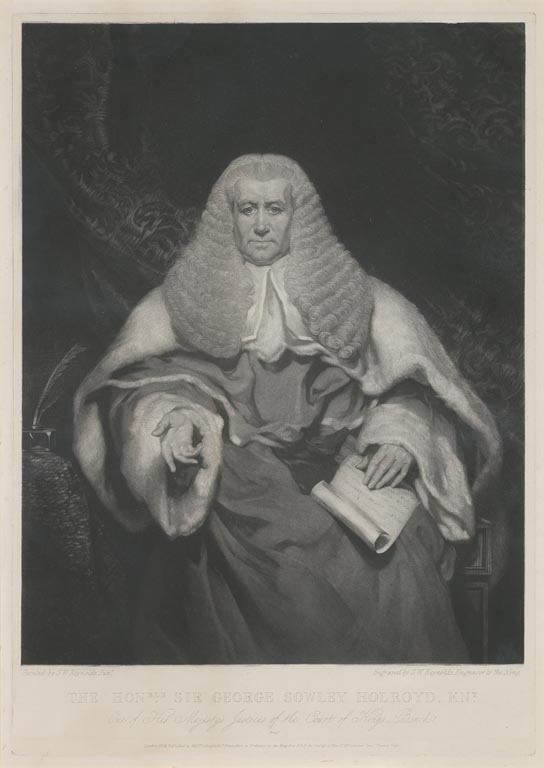
Sir George Sowley Holroyd, trial judge in R v Thornton

Through its eleven witnesses, the defence established an alibi for Thornton. Milkman William Jennings (in some sources Jennans) testified that he saw Thornton at 4:30 am, walking leisurely by the farm of John Holden, where Jennings went to buy milk. The Holden farm was 2.25 to 2.5 miles (3.6 to 4.0 km) from the pit, depending on the path taken. At about 4:50 a.m., Thornton was seen at Castle Bromwich by a gamekeeper, John Heydon. Thornton told Heydon that he was with a woman much of the night, and after the two spent about fifteen minutes conversing, Thornton went on towards his father's house. The defence contended that for Thornton to have murdered Ashford, he would have had to chase her down, rape her, kill her, and then travel three miles (4.8 km), all in at most eleven minutes.

The witnesses took ten hours to testify, during which time the court sat continuously. After a short break, the judge began his summing up, taking two hours to charge the jury. The judge urged the jury to put their prejudice at hearing that Thornton had had sex with Ashford out of their heads; they were there to determine if Thornton was guilty of the offence charged. He pointed out to the jury the lack of concealment exhibited by Thornton, his admission of the sexual act and of being with Ashford until 4 a.m. The judge told them it was not possible for Thornton to have committed the acts alleged by the prosecution and still have made it to the Holden farm by the time he was seen by Heydon, and stressed that Thornton did not act like a man who ran. The judge concluded by reminding the jury that it was better a murderer go free than an innocent man be convicted. The jury never left the box, but instead conferred together and found Thornton not guilty in six minutes. They were then resworn on the rape allegation. The prosecution informed the court that it had no evidence to offer on that count, and Mr Justice Holroyd directed the jury to find the prisoner not guilty of rape, which they did. Thornton was set free.

== Appeal ==
The acquittal of Thornton was met with outrage in Warwickshire, and indeed across the country. Newspapers published letters and comments which were extremely hostile toward Thornton. The leading papers in this campaign were the Lichfield Mercury and the Independent Whig, but even The Times expressed delight when it learned that the case would be further pursued. Funds were obtained from contributors, and a local solicitor prevailed on Mary's brother, William Ashford, to bring an appeal of murder against Thornton. William Ashford was described as "a plain country young man, about twenty-two years of age, of short stature, sandy hair, and blue eyes". A writ of appeal was issued on 1 October 1817, and Thornton was arrested on a warrant issued pursuant to that writ. As the appeal was to be tried before the King's Bench in London, Thornton was taken to London on 28 October. Supporters of the Ashford family did their best to find evidence to upset his alibi. They had little success. On 6 November, the case first came before the Court, but was quickly adjourned until the 17th when Reader indicated that he had just been instructed, and needed more time to advise his client as to his plea. The initial hearing was little attended, apparently because the public did not realise the notorious Thornton would be there in person.

The Warwickshire magistrate, Bedford, was now acting as solicitor for William Ashford. At first, he saw no reason for uneasiness in the appeal. However, on 11 November, he wrote to his clerk,

I am sorry to say that difficulties have been started likely to occasion much trouble and perhaps ultimate defeat. it seems the Appellee [Thornton] has the option of waging Battle and of challenging the Appellor [William Ashford] in single combat which if not accepted by the Appellor the suit is lost and, if accepted, and the Appellee can hold out from sun rise to sun set, then he wins the contest and claims his discharge, otherwise his election subjects him not only to a good threshing [sic] but also the pain of death into the bargain. It is rumoured here that is the plea intended to be set up by the Def. and unless we can devise any means by arguement [sic] to induce the Court not to allow it, I am very apprehensive our poor little Knight will never be able to contend the Battle with his brutish opponent.

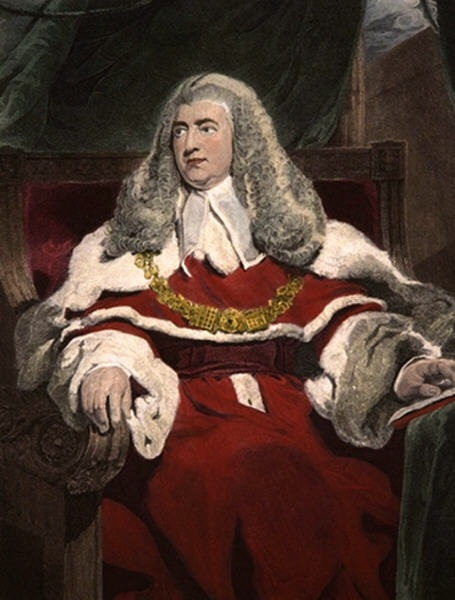
Lord Ellenborough

When the case came to be heard in the King's Bench on 17 November, a huge crowd packed Westminster Hall to such an extent that counsel had great difficulty in entering. When Thornton was called upon for his plea, he responded, "Not guilty; and I am ready to defend the same with my body." He then put on one of a pair of leather gauntlets, which Reader handed him. Thornton threw down the other for William Ashford to pick up and thus accept the challenge, which Ashford did not do. Instead, his counsel, Nathaniel Clarke, argued that Thornton should not be able to compound his murder of the sister with an attempt to murder the brother, to which the Lord Chief Justice, Lord Ellenborough responded, "It is the law of England, Mr Clarke; we must not call it murder." Clarke then argued Ashford's youth and lack of bodily strength as a reason not to allow the battle. Reader, in reply, stated that Ashford's counsel should not waste the Court's time by arguing that trial by battle was unwise because of Ashford's physical condition, but should file responsive pleadings and allow the case to move forward. Reader also noted that he and his co-counsel had advised Thornton to wage battle out of concern that with the "extraordinary and unprecedented prejudice" against the defendant, a fair jury could not be obtained. The matter was adjourned to 22 November to allow Ashford's counsel to file pleadings.

At subsequent hearings, each side submitted replications (affidavits) with his version of the evidence. Ashford sought for the Court to rule that the evidence against Thornton was strong and that the defendant was thus ineligible to wage battle; Thornton sought the opposite. Much of the case was argued between 6 and 8 February 1818, but one of Ashford's counsel, Joseph Chitty, asked for and received more time so he could reply to the other side's arguments, and the matter was adjourned until 16 April. Chitty then responded but was so often interrupted in his argument by the judges that when he sat down, according to Sir John Hall in his book on the affair, "it was clear to everyone in Court that his client had lost his case".

The judges conferred for about a quarter of an hour, and then delivered judgment seriatim (one after the other). All four ruled for Thornton, holding that the evidence against him was not so strong as to oust his right to battle. Lord Ellenborough stated that

The discussion which has taken place here, and the consideration which has been given to the facts alleged, most conclusively show that this is not a case that can admit of no denial or proof to the contrary; under these circumstances, however obnoxious I am myself to the trial by battle, it is the mode of trial which we, in our judicial character, are bound to award. We are delivering the law as it is, and not as we wish it to be, and therefore we must pronounce our judgment, that the battle must take place.

After the other judges delivered their judgments, Lord Ellenborough concluded,

The general law of this land is in favour of the wager of battle, and it is our duty to pronounce the law as it is, and not as we may wish it to be. Whatever prejudices may exist therefore against this mode of trial, still as it is the law of the land, the Court must pronounce judgment for it.

However, Lord Ellenborough indicated that Ashford could ask that Thornton be allowed "to go without a day", that is, be released without obligation to return to court. The matter was adjourned until 20 April for Ashford to consider his options, whether to allow Thornton's release or meet him in battle. On 20 April, Ashford's counsel indicated that he had no objection to Thornton's discharge, so long as no action would be taken against his client. With the appellant reassured on that point, the appeal was dismissed. Thornton was then given a pro forma arraignment on the murder charge, to which he interposed a plea that he was acquitted previously. The plea being accepted, the case was ended, and Thornton was freed. With an angry mob outside, Thornton left (at Lord Ellenborough's direction) through a side door.

== Aftermath ==
Appeal of Murder, etc. Act 1819
- Act of Parliament
- Parliament of the United Kingdom
- Long title: An act to abolish Appeals of Murder, Treason, Felony or other Offences, and Wager of Battel, or joining Issue and Trial by Battel, in Writs of Right.
- Citation: 59 Geo. 3. c. 46
- Territorial extent: United Kingdom

Dates
- Royal assent: 22 June 1819
- Commencement: 22 June 1819 (Note: Section 1.)
- Repealed: 5 August 1873
Other legislation
Repealed by	Statute Law Revision Act 1873

Status: Repealed

Text of statute as originally enacted

In June 1819, Lord Eldon, the Lord Chancellor, introduced a bill to abolish private appeals following acquittals and to abolish trial by battle. The bill passed into an Act in great haste – all three required readings in the House of Lords passed on one night. According to Sir Robert Megarry, who wrote of the trial in 2005, the haste was due to a wager of battle being made in another case, though the names of the parties are not known. The Appeal of Murder etc. Act 1819 (59 Geo. 3. c. 46) recited, "whereas appeals of murder, treason, felony, and other offences, and the manner of proceeding therein, have been found to be oppressive; and the trial by battle in any suit, is a mode of trial unfit to be used; and it is expedient that the same should be wholly abolished". The Act abolished appeals of murder and other offences, and enacted in section 2: "that from and after the passing of this act, in any writ of right now depending, or which may hereafter be brought, instituted, or commenced, the tenant shall not be received to wage battel, nor shall issue be joined nor trial be had by battel in any writ of right; any law, custom, or usage to the contrary notwithstanding."

Abraham Thornton returned to Castle Bromwich, but found the general dislike in which he was held unbearable. He booked passage to New York aboard the Independence, but when his fellow passengers found out who he was, they insisted on his being put ashore. On 30 September 1818, Abraham Thornton sailed from Liverpool aboard the Shamrock to New York. In the United States, he worked as a bricklayer, married and had children. One source claims that he died around 1860 in Baltimore but there is no evidence for this. William Ashford, who for many years worked as a fish-hawker in Birmingham, was found dead in his bed there in January 1867, at the age of seventy. According to Walter Thornbury, who wrote of the case in the late 19th century, "The causes of Mary Ashford's death, only the Last Day can now reveal." Mary Ashford's grave is marked by a murder stone which states that she "incautiously repaired to a scene of amusement, without proper protection".

Academics have argued that Ashford v Thornton inspired the judicial combat which is the climax of Sir Walter Scott's Ivanhoe. Scott mentioned the case in his other writings, discussed it with his friends, and backdated the dedication to the book two years to the date of Thornton's wager of battle. An attempt was made in 1985 to claim trial by battle, brought by two brothers in Scotland who were accused of armed robbery, on the grounds that the abolition did not apply in Scotland. The attempt failed when the defendants could offer no evidence to oust the statutory presumption that Parliamentary acts apply to the entire United Kingdom. In 2002, a 60-year-old man, charged with failing to pay a £25 penalty for a minor motoring offence, appeared before magistrates and demanded trial by battle against a champion to be nominated by the Driver and Vehicle Licensing Agency. He argued that trial by battle was still valid under European human rights legislation. A statement from the Lord Chancellor's office on the matter affirmed that only jury trial and trial by magistrates were legally valid options. The magistrates fined the defendant £200, with £100 costs.

== Bibliography ==
- Burn, Richard (1820), The Justice of the Peace and Parish Officer, Volume 1 (23rd ed.), T. Cadell
- Dyer, Gary R. (Summer 1997). "Ivanhoe, Chivalry, and the Death of Mary Ashford". Criticism. 39 (3): 383–408. ISSN 0011-1589. JSTOR 23118124.
- Hall, John, ed. (1926). Trial of Abraham Thornton. Edinburgh: William Hodge. LCCN 26-012966 – via Internet Archive.
- Megarry, Sir Robert (2005), A New Miscellany-at-Law: Yet Another Diversion for Lawyers and Others, Hart Pub., ISBN 978-1-58477-631-4
- Sapstead, David (16 December 2002), "Court refuses trial by combat", The Telegraph
- Schoenfield, Mark (1997), "Waging battle: Ashford v Thornton, Ivanhoe and legal violence", in Simmons, Clare (ed.), Medievalism and the Quest for the "Real" Middle Ages, Routledge, pp. 61–86, ISBN 978-0-7146-5145-3
- Thornbury, Walter (1879), Old Stories Re-Told (new ed.), Chatto and Windus
