= Private prosecution =

Criminal proceeding without public prosecutor

A private prosecution is a criminal proceeding initiated by an individual private citizen or private organisation (such as a prosecution association) instead of by a public prosecutor who represents the state. Private prosecution was widespread in many jurisdictions until the mid 19th century when public prosecutors were established and resourced. Private prosecution exists in many jurisdictions under common law, and "remain[s] a valuable constitutional safeguard against inertia or partiality on the part of authority”.

== Australia ==
A private criminal prosecution for contempt of court can be commenced against a party in Australia in the Federal Circuit Court, the family court (that is, the Family Court of Western Australia, as it is the only jurisdiction with a state-based family court) or the supreme court of a state or territory.

=== Western Australia ===
In the Family Court of Western Australia, an online form exists to commence such proceedings which can be downloaded, completed and filed.

In the Supreme Court of Western Australia, either an originating summons (Form No.75 as is an ex-parte application) or originating motion (Form No.64) must be filed specifying the alleged contempt, and personally served on the alleged contemptor before a hearing before a judge sitting in chambers unless the court orders otherwise.

If the alleged contempt occurred in relation to any specific case, the forms are required to be filed under the heading of the parties for that specific case; or if it is not alleged to have been committed with reference to a particular proceeding, shall be entitled "The State of Western Australia against" the contemnor (naming him) ex parte the applicant.

=== New South Wales ===
In New South Wales private prosecutions are legal but very rare. In 2022, gambling lobby group ClubsNSW brought a private prosecution for contempt of court against comedian and journalist friendlyjordies and whistleblower Troy Stolz. This prosecution was also subject to an interim suppression order, making it secret temporarily.

== Belize ==
In 2014, the private prosecution of politician Elvin Penner by a grass-roots citizens organization (COLA) over issuance of fraudulent passports was unsuccessful because the defense succeeded in arguing that the private prosecutor did not have the power to subpoena police records on the case. An attorney for COLA indicated that the government did not wish a prosecution of Penner to be undertaken, and acted to block its success.

== Canada ==
Canada is a federation, and has both federal and provincial offences that can be privately prosecuted. Federally, there are criminal and statutory offences, and provincially there are provincial and municipal non-criminal offences. Under Canada's constitution, all criminal offences in Canada are under federal jurisdiction, and the Government of Canada can provide funds to the private prosecutors (in lieu of assigning its own Crown attorney) to carry out this work.

Leaders of the Winnipeg General Strike of 1919 were tried on charges of seditious conspiracy by state-funded private prosecutors. The funds were disbursed from the Government of Canada's approved expenditures, and are evidenced in the Auditor General's reports of 1921 and 1922.

A committee chaired by Mr. Justice Allen Linden of the Law Reform Commission of Canada produced a Working Paper on Private Prosecutions in 1986. Peter T. Burns, a law professor (and later dean) at the University of British Columbia's Peter A. Allard School of Law, wrote a paper in 1975 for the McGill Law Journal entitled "Private Prosecutions in Canada: The Law and a Proposal for Change"; he was later the Principal Consultant for the Law Reform Commission. Swaigen, Koehl and Hatt in 2013 summarised efforts to prosecute privately torts in the environmental domain.

=== Criminal offence procedure for private charges ===
Very basically, a citizen or organisation approaches a justice of the peace to present evidence on each element of the alleged offence. The justice then sets up a hearing with a judge to determine whether there is evidence on each element of the offence, and if approved, and if the Crown does not intervene and terminate the charge (called staying the charge) then it is allowed to proceed to and go through court via the criminal procedure.

=== Provincial offence procedure for private prosecution ===
Each province in Canada deals with private prosecutions of provincial offences in their own way.

==== Ontario ====
In Ontario, the procedure for commencing a private prosecution for a provincial offence is governed by Part III of the Provincial Offences Act, ss. 23(1) of which provides that, "Any person who, on reasonable and probable grounds, believes that one or more persons have committed an offence, may lay an information in the prescribed form and under oath before a justice alleging the offence and the justice shall receive the information." The laying of an information as described in Part III of the Act allows anyone to commence a prosecution for a provincial offence, whereas Parts I and II of the Act may only be used by a provincial offences officer.

==== British Columbia ====
In British Columbia, the guidelines for private prosecutions are detailed in the Crown Counsel Policy Manual by the BC Prosecution Service. The policy, designated as PRI 1, has been in effect since March 1, 2018. According to this policy, the BC Prosecution Service generally does not endorse private prosecutions. When such a prosecution is initiated, it is common practice for the Crown Counsel to either assume responsibility for the prosecution or to direct a stay of proceedings subsequent to an evaluation known as a charge assessment decision. The said assessment also pertains to Informations presented under sections 810 and 810.1 of the Criminal Code.

When the Crown Counsel is notified of a private Information or a 507.1 Criminal Code private prosecution process hearing, there is a procedural sequence to follow. It entails a review of the Information and related documents, an evaluation against the charge assessment criteria, and consultations with senior legal personnel about the prospective charge. Post this evaluation, a decision is made about whether the Crown Counsel will lead the prosecution or if proceedings will be stayed.

If a private Information is officially submitted, the Crown Counsel can, at any juncture, direct a stay of proceedings, especially if the charge does not meet the assessment criteria. Should a process be sanctioned after a 507.1 hearing, it's imperative to acquire a transcript of said hearing. In situations warranting further inquiry, the Crown Counsel may direct the pertinent agencies to delve deeper. Subsequent to these investigations, a reassessment is done, followed by consultations on the next course of action.

Furthermore, the Crown Counsel assesses for potential conflicts of interest or issues of confidentiality concerning the accused in the private Information. If deemed necessary, outside legal counsel or a special prosecutor might be appointed to oversee the case.

== France ==
There are three types of criminal offences in France:

- Crimes, punishable by up to imprisonment for life;
- Délits, punishable by up to 10 years imprisonment (20 years for recidivists);
- Contraventions, punishable by criminal fine up to €1500 (€3000 for recidivists).

In France private prosecution is called citation directe, and is possible only for délits and contraventions, if the victim has evidence of the offence.

The court sits with either one or three judges, without jury (a jury is present only for crimes, see cour d'assises).

In court, the private prosecutor sits alongside the public prosecutor as an accessory, and is merely called the "civil plaintiff" (partie civile), as French criminal courts also rule on civil delictual claims during the same proceeding. Trials take place in this way even when the prosecution was initiated by the public prosecution office (which is far more usual than a private prosecution).

The plaintiff and the accused are both represented by normal attorneys, sitting at the ground-level of the courtroom, while the public prosecutor, considered by French law as a magistrate, sits on a platform as the court, although he does not participate in their deliberations.

The public prosecutor gives the court his opinion about the case after the plaintiff and before the defense. Eventually, the defendant may be convicted even if the public prosecutor requested acquittal.

In France, appeal courts retry both facts and law. The accused may appeal a conviction and sentence, but the plaintiff can only appeal damages. He cannot appeal an acquittal or a more lenient criminal punishment, contrary to the public prosecutor, who can do this even if the prosecution was private.

For crimes or when the plaintiff has insufficient evidence, he may refer to an investigating judge (juge d'instruction) who will investigate the case, and refer it to the trial court (in which he does not sit) if he discovers sufficient evidence of guilt. The investigating judge is independent from the public prosecutor's office, and may refer the case to the trial court even if the public prosecutor requested non-suit.

Indeed, French law allows some associations to instigate private prosecutions (similar to American private attorneys general), but only for some few offences such as racist speech. In 2013, this possibility has been added for some white-collar crimes.

If the defendant is convicted, the criminal court can sentence him to pay damages to the plaintiff for the criminal offence, and to reimburse his legal costs, in addition to the criminal punishment. But if the private prosecution or the referral to the investigating judge is regarded as abusive, the plaintiff may be sentenced to pay damages to the accused and a civil fine to the state.

== Hong Kong ==
In Hong Kong, the right to bring a private prosecution is preserved under common law and is governed by Chapter 7 of the Prosecution Code, which states that "a person has the right to commence a criminal prosecution in the public interest". Section 14 of the Magistrates Ordinance (Cap. 227) enables a complainant or informant to conduct a prosecution either in person or by counsel. However, this right is not absolute. The Secretary for Justice is entitled to intervene in a private prosecution at any stage and assume its conduct, becoming a party to the proceedings and displacing the original prosecutor. The Secretary may also prevent proceedings from continuing by declining to sign the charge sheet or indictment. A magistrate may refuse to issue a private summons for good cause.

=== Selina Cheng v. Dow Jones Publishing Co. (Asia) Inc. ===
The most notable recent private prosecution in Hong Kong is Selina Cheng v. Dow Jones Publishing Co. (Asia) Inc. Cheng, a former reporter for the Wall Street Journal filed a complaint with Hong Kong's Labour Department, which investigated but ultimately declined to prosecute.

In February 2025, Cheng launched a private prosecution against Dow Jones Publishing Co (Asia) Inc., the parent company of the Wall Street Journal. Dow Jones faced two charges under the city's Employment Ordinance: one count of doing an act calculated to prevent or deter an employee from exercising union participation rights, and one count of terminating employment over union participation.

On 10 September 2026, Principal Magistrate David Cheung convicted Dow Jones of the first charge of deterring Cheng from exercising her union participation rights. The court acquitted the company on the second charge of terminating Cheng's employment over her union role, with the magistrate finding that the defence had raised sufficient reasonable doubt.

== India ==
Private prosecutions are overwhelmingly redirected to police investigations rather than proceeding to trial, according to 2022 statistics.

== Ireland ==
Private prosecutions remain possible in the Republic of Ireland, though only at the District Court level where less serious offences are heard before a judge only.

The continuing existence of the right to private prosecution was confirmed in 2013 in the decision of the case Kelly & anor -v- Ryan ([2013] IEHC 321).

== New Zealand ==
Private prosecutions remain legal in New Zealand.

== Philippines ==
Private prosecutors in the Philippines are private attorneys that work with police and public prosecutors to help bring criminal cases. They often work to get the location of a trial moved to a more neutral court, outside the influence of local power brokers, and to prepare the necessary legal petitions and other documents. They also help to look after the victim's family and keep media and public attention focused on the case.

Private prosecutors can be involved in cases in front of the national anti-corruption court the Sandiganbayan.

== Singapore ==
A private prosecution is brought by a private individual who wishes to seek redress for a wrong they believe has been done to them. That individual would have to first file a complaint with a Magistrate at the State Courts. If the person does not have a lawyer, that individual may conduct the prosecution themselves.

== South Africa ==
=== NSPCA South Africa ===
The National Council of Societies for the Prevention of Cruelty to Animals (NSPCA) had its victory in the Constitutional Court of South Africa on 8 December 2016 when the organisation won its case it brought before the Court to institute Private Prosecutions in terms of Section 8 of the Criminal Procedure Act, 1977. This after the organisation lost its cases it brought before the North Gauteng High Court and the Supreme Court of Appeal of South Africa on the same matter of Private Prosecutions. The reason the NSPCA brought the case before the Courts is because despite "overwhelming" evidence of animal cruelty or abuse‚ the National Prosecuting Authority of South Africa (NPA) declined to prosecute the cases brought by the organisation, resulting in animal abusers not being charged on charges of animal cruelty. The Constitutional Court of South Africa also ruled that the respondents, the Minister of Justice and Constitutional Development and the National Director of Public Prosecutions, were to pay the organisation's costs in all three applications.

== Sweden ==
Private prosecutions are permitted under the Code of Judicial Procedure of 1942, chapter 20, section 8, provided the individual has locus standi, i.e. is the direct victim of a crime (or, in the case of murder or manslaughter, a close relative) and that a public prosecutor has officially declined to proceed. For certain crimes, such as defamation, or insult, of living adults, only the aggrieved party may initiate criminal proceedings (defamation being a crime and not a tort in Sweden), although they are frequently assisted or represented by competent legal counsel. Mandatory private prosecution serves the purpose of limiting superfluous litigation. For serious crimes private prosecutions are rare, with a man accused of absconding and murdering a boy, whose body was never found, being convicted for false imprisonment to a prison term in 1985, but acquitted of the more serious charge of kidnapping in a 3–2 verdict. In the Court of Appeal, where the victim's parents altered the accusation to murder, the accused was acquitted of all charges the following year, with the Supreme Court of Sweden refusing to hear the case. The procedure and its aftermath, with alleged serial killer Thomas Quick being convicted for the murder on the basis of a confession a few years later, led to accusations of a substantially higher bar for relatives and private-employed lawyers processing prosecutions, as compared to a public prosecutor presenting the same evidence.

== United Kingdom ==
Private prosecutions are permitted in the United Kingdom. They are governed by different rules in the different jurisdictions.

=== England and Wales ===
Private prosecution is allowed in English law and there were 352,276 private prosecutions in magistrates courts in 2024, 27% of all prosecutions in magistrates courts that year; these exclude prosecutions led by the police or Crown Prosecution Service but include those by other public organisations such as the TV Licencing Authority.

In the early history of England, the victim of a crime and his family had the right to hire a private lawyer to prosecute criminal charges against the person alleged to have injured the victim. In the 18th century, prosecution was private for almost all criminal offences against the person, usually by the victim. One reason for this was that prosecution had never been conceived of as a public matter. The English system was based on the principles of individual and local prosecution in which the right of the private citizen was paramount. The exception to this norm was in offences where the victim was the Crown, and the Attorney-General and the Solicitor-General represented the prosecution at state trials; for an example, see the 1637 ship money tax protest case of John Hampden.

As detailed above, a route to prosecution had been by victims at their own expense or lawyers acting on their behalf. From the Metropolitan Police Act 1829 onwards, as the police forces entered their present form, they began to take on the burden of bringing prosecutions against suspected criminals.

In 1880, Sir John Maule was appointed to be the first Director of Public Prosecutions, operating as a part of the Home Office. The jurisdiction was only for the decision as to whether to prosecute, and just for a very small number of difficult or important cases. Once prosecution had been authorised, the matter was turned over to the Treasury Solicitor. Police forces continued to be responsible for the bulk of cases, sometimes referring difficult ones to the Director.

Prior to its termination in 1933, criminal prosecution required a true bill of indictment from the grand jury, and so frivolous and vexatious proceedings were designed to be avoided at this stage (although this did not turn out to be the case in practice).

In 1962, the Royal Commission on the Police recommended that police forces set up independent prosecution departments so as to avoid having the same officers investigate and prosecute cases.

The Royal Commission's recommendation was not implemented by all police forces, and so in 1978 another Royal Commission was struck, this time headed by Sir Cyril Philips. It reported in 1981, recommending that a single unified Crown prosecution service with responsibility for all public prosecutions in England and Wales be set up. A White Paper was released in 1983, becoming the Prosecution of Offences Act 1985, which established the Crown Prosecution Service under the direction of the Director of Public Prosecutions, consisting of a merger of his old department with the existing police prosecution departments. It started operating in 1986. The CPS can also prevent a private prosecution from continuing by taking it over and then discontinuing it. The CPS supposedly will do this only where there is not enough evidence to make a proper case, or where a prosecution is against the public interest or could cause an injustice. In reaching this decision, it must balance the public good against a duty to preserve an individual's right to prosecute under the 1985 act.

When taking over any private prosecution, the CPS may direct the police to conduct further investigations. The intention of this was to ensure the best available evidence was placed before the court, as further trials were generally excluded until 2003 by the double jeopardy rule. The latter rule was abrogated in certain circumstances of "new and compelling evidence", and for a limited range of the most serious offences such as rape, armed robbery and murder, by the Criminal Justice Act 2003. Recommended by Blunkett, Irvine and Goldsmith, this change is permitted by the optional Article 4 of the Seventh Protocol to the European Convention on Human Rights, although the United Kingdom is not a party to it.

==== Post Office Private Prosecutions ====
Between 1999 and 2015, more than 900 subpostmasters were wrongfully convicted of theft, fraud and false accounting based on faulty Horizon data, with about 700 of these being private carried out by the Post Office. In 2024, Prime Minister Rishi Sunak described the scandal as one of the greatest miscarriages of justice in British history. The Post Office (Horizon System) Offences Act 2024 quashed the convictions.

=== Scotland ===
Private prosecutions are rare in Scots law and require special circumstances surrounding the crime to be evident. Leave to prosecute must be obtained by granting of a bill of criminal letters by the High Court of Justiciary. Within the 20th century, only two such applications were granted.

== United States ==
In colonial America, because of Dutch (and possibly French) practice and the expansion of the office of attorney general, public officials came to dominate the prosecution of crimes. However, privately funded prosecutors constituted a significant element of the state criminal justice system throughout the 19th century.

For federal criminal cases, only the U.S. government can file charges.

Private prosecutions are not legal in California, Colorado, Hawaii, Iowa, Massachusetts, Minnesota, Missouri, and New York.

=== Alabama ===
State law currently allows private citizens the right to press charges under certain circumstances. In Alabama, a citizen or "victim" who has probable cause to believe that a crime has been committed can directly go to court and sign an arrest warrant before a magistrate, without the police or a judge's approval. The government will then handle the prosecution of the offense.

=== Georgia ===
In Georgia, criminal proceedings may be initiated at the request of a private citizen, but only after the defendant is given an opportunity to argue why he or she should not be charged.

=== Idaho ===
Idaho allows private citizens to file criminal complaints to a magistrate; the magistrate can issue an arrest warrant upon satisfaction that a crime has occurred.

=== Kentucky ===
Kentucky allows a private citizen to initiate criminal cases by filing criminal complaints, although it is up to the county attorney or Commonwealth's attorney to decide whether to proceed with the case.

=== Maryland ===
Maryland allows private citizens to file affidavits against another citizen.

=== Michigan ===
Private citizens can file and attest misdemeanor arrest warrants which if accepted by a judge or magistrate would be automatically transferred to a prosecuting attorney.

=== New Hampshire ===
New Hampshire allows private prosecution of any crime that does not carry incarceration as a possible penalty. However, prosecutors have the right to dismiss private criminal charges.

=== New Jersey ===
New Jersey continues to allow private prosecutions in its Municipal Courts. However, the 1995 decision of State v. Storm prohibited private prosecutions if the party intending to prosecute has a conflict of interest with the defendants or a financial interest in the case. Furthermore, state law states that all private prosecutions require approval of the county prosecutor and the court.

=== New York ===
In 2002, a federal district court concluded in Kampfer v. Vonderheide that private prosecutions were barred under New York law as a violation of the defendant's due process rights. However, in Kampfer the court distinguished, in dicta, private prosecutions where there is an "underlying civil cause of action" in relation to the events which gave rise to the prosecution.

=== North Carolina ===
Private prosecutors were used in North Carolina as late as 1975. The court ruled in State v. Best in 1974 that an elected prosecutor must be in charge of all prosecutions. A private citizen may go before a magistrate to request that criminal process be issued, but any such charges are prosecuted by the State.

=== Ohio ===
Ohio state law allows private citizens to file an affidavit to support criminal charges. However, the actual prosecution is limited to the state. Only prosecutors can present a criminal case to a grand jury. State law was further amended in 2006 to bar judges from issuing arrest warrants in private prosecution cases.

=== Pennsylvania ===
Private prosecutions in Pennsylvania require approval from a state prosecutor.

=== Rhode Island ===
In 2001, the Rhode Island Supreme Court ruled in Diane S. Cronan ex rel. State v. John J. Cronan that a private citizen could file criminal complaints for misdemeanors. In order to do so under R.I. Gen. Laws § 12-10-12, a judge of the district court or superior court must choose to place the criminal complaint on file. However, prosecution of felonies remains limited to the state. Private prosecutors also cannot seek penalties of greater than one year of incarceration or a fine of greater than $1,000.

=== South Carolina ===
The right was removed from South Carolina law in the 19th century. However, private citizens may still initiate a criminal case by filing a request with a magistrate, although magistrates can issue only a summons in response to private criminal complaints.

=== Wisconsin ===
Private prosecutions in Wisconsin were outlawed following the decision of Biemel v. State in 1855. In 1890, the court ruled that a private attorney can assist in a prosecution as long as there is no conflict of interest.

== Controversy ==
Bruce L. Benson's To Serve and Protect lauds the role of private prosecutors, often employed by prosecution associations, in serving the needs of crime victims in England. There have been calls for restoring the practice of private prosecution, especially in cases of official misconduct, where judges, public prosecutors, and the police act in concert to violate the law. Some libertarian theorists hold that public prosecutors should not exist, but that crimes should instead be treated as civil torts. Murray Rothbard writes, "In a libertarian world, there would be no crimes against an ill-defined 'society,' and therefore no such person as a 'district attorney' who decides on a charge and then presses those charges against an alleged criminal."

Private prosecution is sometimes regarded with suspicion as a potential avenue for vexatious or malicious prosecution. Okagbue writes that the most useful control against such abuses is the power of the court to refuse to allow the case to proceed where it is of the opinion that there is not enough evidence to support the charge. The cost of private prosecution, including potential civil liability for malicious prosecution, can also deter frivolous prosecutions.

== Notable private prosecution attempts ==
- Oscar Wilde initiated an unsuccessful private prosecution for defamatory libel against the Marquess of Queensberry when the latter publicly accused Wilde of sodomy, which was then a crime. This was unsuccessful, and Wilde himself ended up facing charges brought by the DPP (following petition by Queensberry’s lawyer) and was ultimately convicted of gross indecency, with a punishment of two years at hard labor.
- Whitehouse v. Lemon (1977) was the last successful blasphemy prosecution in the United Kingdom.
- In 1995 Women Against Rape, together with Legal Action for Women and the English Collective of Prostitutes, helped two women bring the first private prosecution for rape in England and Wales after the prosecuting authority refused to prosecute. They went to court without the Crown Prosecution Service (CPS). On the same evidence the CPS had said was insufficient, the man was given a 16-year sentence, reduced to 11 years on appeal. This trial was made into a play, Pursuing Justice – Sex workers take their rapist to court, which was performed in 2015 to sell-out audiences.
- The family of Stephen Lawrence brought charges against the five men they alleged had killed him (1996). The private prosecution was unsuccessful; one suspect's acquittal in the criminal trial was quashed in 2011, with a subsequent trial resulting in his and another suspect's conviction in 2012.
- Following the 2014 police killing of Tamir Rice in Ohio, activists attempted to invoke the law to charge the officers involved. Although a judge agreed that there was probable cause for charges, he could only send the case back to the prosecutor due to the 2006 amendment to state law that bars judges from issuing arrest warrants in criminal cases initiated by private citizens.
- Between 1999 and 2015, Post Office Limited brought private prosecutions against some 700 sub-postmasters and postmistresses, which were subsequently overturned in a scandal described by Prime Minister Rishi Sunak in 2024 as one of the greatest miscarriages of justice in British history. In these cases, the Post Office, a private company (albeit state-owned), acted in three roles: as victim, investigator and prosecutor.
- In 2025, former The Wall Street Journal reporter Selina Cheng brought a private prosecution against Dow Jones Publishing Co. (Asia) Inc., the newspaper's Asian publishing arm, under Hong Kong's Employment Ordinance, after the Labour Department declined to prosecute. Cheng alleged she had been deterred from taking up, and then dismissed over, her election as chair of the Hong Kong Journalists Association. On 10 September 2026, the Eastern Magistrates' Courts convicted the company of deterring her from exercising her union rights and acquitted it of dismissing her over her union role. (See #Hong Kong.)

== See also ==
- Lawsuit
- Private attorney general
- Criminal appeal
