= Ghar Bachao Ghar Banao Andolan =

Ghar Bachao Ghar Banao Aandolan (Hindi: घर बचाओ घर बनाओ आंदोलन, 'save homes, make homes movement') is a people's movement that emerged in the backdrop of massive slum demolitions in Mumbai in 2003–04. It started in 2005 as a struggle for housing rights in Mumbai, and continues to fight for rights of slum-dwellers and those cheated by the builders in various rehabilitation and redevelopment projects, including slum-dwellers, those affected by the Slum Rehabilitation Act and the unorganised sector workers. It is a part of the National Alliance of People's Movements and is led by Medha Patkar.

== History ==
A demolition on 2 and 3 April 2013 in the Golibar area, Mumbai, Maharashtra evicting 43 houses and displacing more than 200 people, was the backdrop against which the movement was born. The resident communities demanded in-situ and participatory housing rights. Medha Patkar with more than 500 slum-dwellers sat on an indefinite fast to protest against any further demolition until an inquiry into the matter was completed. Patkar had alleged corruption and "atrocities" by builders in the city's slum rehabilitation scheme, and called for the halting of six projects by the Slum Rehabilitation Authority, until a proper inquiry was conducted. The inquiry was conducted, that gave only a partial solution, hence communities continued with their struggle. Following the demolition of 75,000 houses of the poor by the Government of Maharashtra in 2005, Medha Patkar and others addressed a public meeting at Azaad Maidan Mumbai advocating mass action, that the communities re-build their houses on the same sites, and continue to assert and attain their right to shelter, water, electricity, sanitation, and livelihood.

== Jeevan Bachao Aandolan, Mahul ==
Jeevan Bachao Aandolan (save lives movement) is a 150-plus-day ongoing protest by the residents of Mahul, Mumbai with the basic demand that rehabilitation is supposed to encompass the restoration of livelihood, education opportunities and all basic amenities in an environment that is safe and liveable. The successful outcome of protest with the Bombay High Courts judgment in favour of the residents is a landmark victory for citizen housing movements in Mumbai.

=== Background ===
In December 2016 and on 13 May 2017, over one thousand slum houses along the Tansa water pipeline in Vidyavhar were demolished. This was done by the Brihanmumbai Municipal Corporation (BMC) in accordance to the 2009 Bombay High Court order to remove slums along the main water pipelines in the city and keep a 10-metre buffer zone around them.

Some of the families received alternate Mumbai Metropolitan Regional Development Authority (MMRDA) accommodation in Mahul village nearly 15 km away despite the National Rehabilitation and Resettlement Policy 2007 which mandates the government to provide alternate accommodation to these people within a 3 km radius of their old homes. Apart from the location, Mahul is one of the most polluted areas in Mumbai due to the large number of polluting and toxic industries like Hindustan Petroleum, Bharat Petroleum refineries, Sea Lord Containers, Aegis Logistics Ltd, Tata Power and Rashtriya Chemical and Fertilizers, among others. Moreover, there were no municipal hospitals and municipal schools in the area.

This caused a spike in the number of illnesses and diseases faced by residents in Mahul post rehabilitation to the colony. The spike in the respiratory, heart and skin diseases and deaths post rehabilitation has been proved by independent experts and the Maharashtra Pollution Control Board's Comprehensive Environment Pollution Index which categorises Mahul as “severely polluted". The high level of toluene in the air led to the 2015 interim judgement by the National Green Tribunal (NGT) that stated Mahul was “unfit for human habitation." As per an RTI query in 2018, there have been 87 deaths in Mahul due to respiratory illnesses. A report by NGO Vishwashanti Lokkalyan in July 2018 found that 60% of the residents faced a health issue because of the polluted environment.

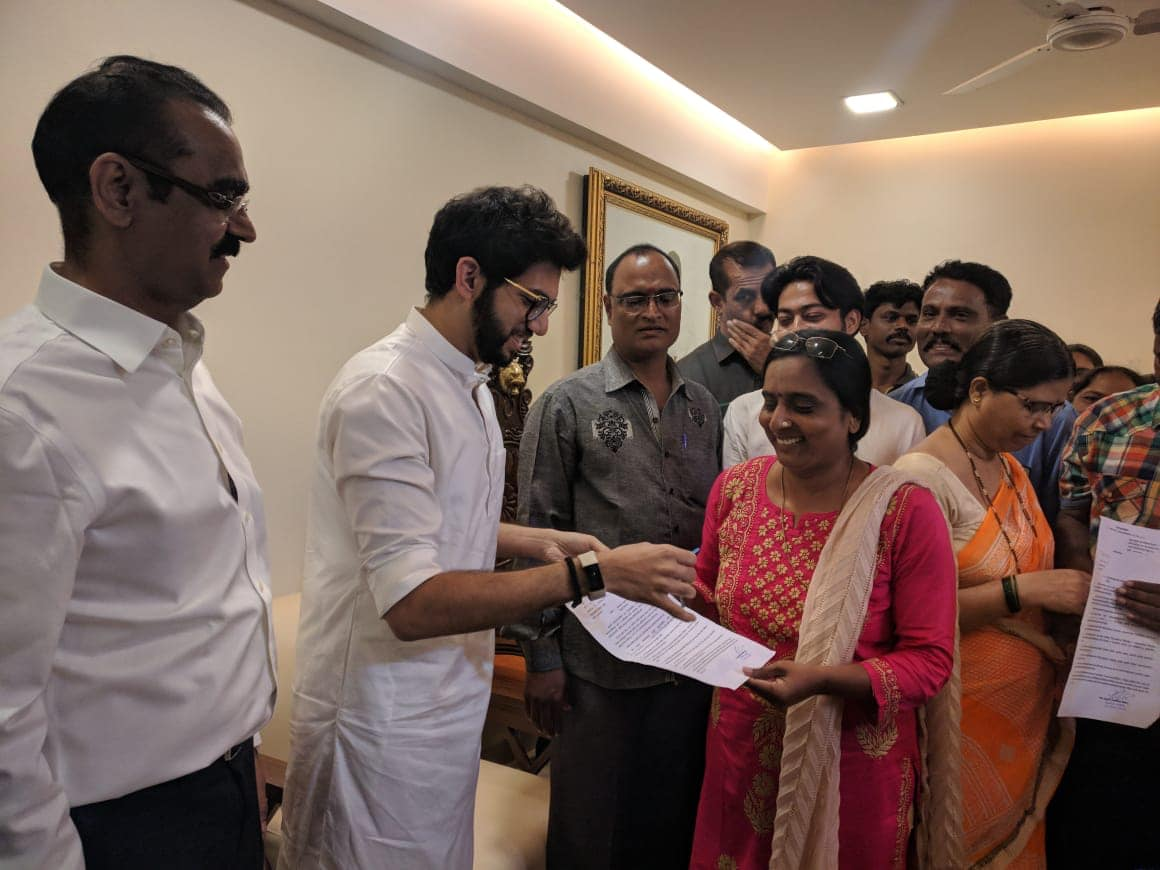
Residents receiving documents from Maharashtra Environment Minister

=== Timeline of events ===
This was:

- March 2018: the protesters moved the Bombay High Court to take action
- July 2018: BMC offers a Rs. 29 crore in-situ development plan for residents which is rejected by residents
- August 8, 2018: HC interim order to move protesters out of Mahul till a solution is found
- October 23, 2018: Residents plan to meet his Sena President Uddhav Thackeray, handover a signed petition to DCP Rajendra Patil
- October 28, 2018: Residents start "Jeevan Bachao Aandolan", goes on for over 150 days.
- November 12, 2018: Protesters meet State Housing Minister Prakash Mehta, who assures he will move them to Kurla
- November 27, 2018: CM tells Yuva Sena leader Aditya Thackeray shifting residents to Kurla not possible, say protesters
- December 16, 2018: Residents march to Azad Maidan
- December 2018: Maharashtra Chief Minister Devendra Fadnavis appoints panel to relocate Mahul residents post mass protests.
- April 4, 2019: Bombay HC directed Govt of Maha to pay monthly rent of Rs. 15000 to Mahul residents and other PAPs along with a deposit of Rs. 45000 as long as the finding of NGT regarding pollution remain intact. Major victory for protestors.
- September 2019: Case remains embroiled in court as Government of Maharashtra refuses to act on Bombay HC decision for compensation
- March 6, 2020: State Environment Minister distributes first batch of 288 houses with assurance that remaining allotment will happen soon.

=== Citizen-led movement ===
Residents who were forced into the unliveable conditions and faced the consequences of the injustice and hazardous conditions came forward to take collective action that resulted in a citizens movement. Bilal Khan the convener of Ghar Bachao Ghar Banao Aandolan coordinated protests and legal processes along with support from Medha Patkar and several social activists.

== Awas Haq Satyagraha, Mandala ==
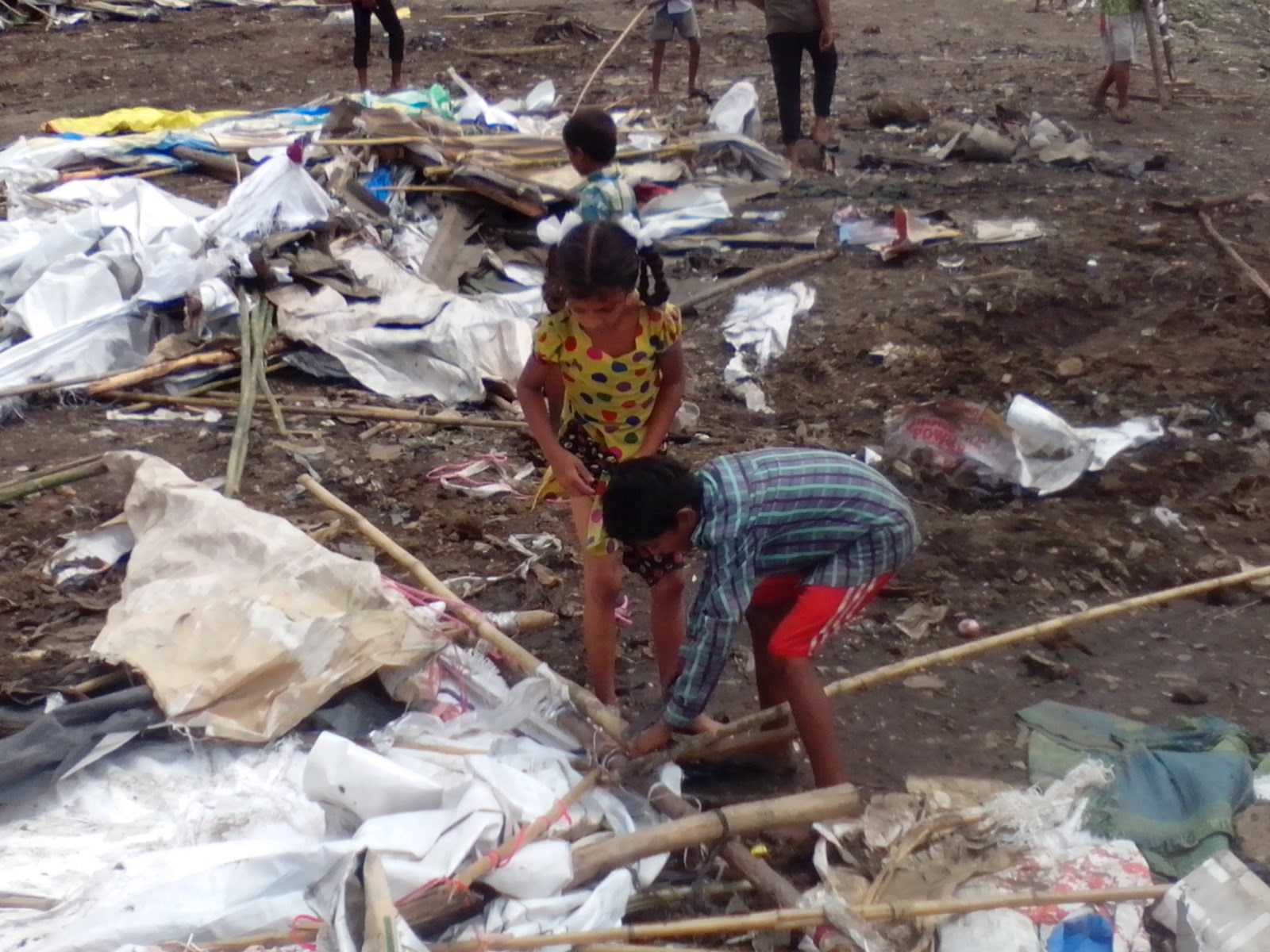
Mandala slum demolition

The Ghar Bachao Ghar Banaoo (GBGB) movement currently works in those slums of Mumbai which have been demolished in or after 2004. It works with the affected community and inculcates leadership from within the community. In 2015, Ghar Bachao Ghar Banao Andolan launched the Awaas Haq Satyagraha (Struggle for Right to Housing) along with residents of Mandala, supported by dwellers from across the city and at least five thousand slum-dwellers continue to be on satyagraha in Mandala, Mankhurd, Mumbai. The demands included that the Rajiv Awas Yojana proposal be approved and 3,000 families be allowed to stay put till then, all basic amenities be provided to all slum communities as per section 5(A) of Slum Act, especially water and toilets and that there should be no eviction before monsoon, and never without an alternative. GBGBA has raised a constant demand that SRA projects wherein corruption has been exposed, needs to be reviewed with priority and justice should be done to people through due process with transparency and people's participation.

== Community activities ==
GBGB believes in building the community and empowering people in informal settlements. Activists and experts from within and outside the community conduct various activities to further this initiative

=== Children Learning Centre ===
The Children learning centre is an initiative taken forward by GBGBA for the benefit of the children from the lower stratum of the society. As the name suggests it is a centre for providing basic education to the children residing in slums so that they are well prepared for the formal education process. The presently active centre is in Shivaji Nagar in Chembur West coordinated by Mr. Gulab Ansari, who is a resident of the respective slum. Also, known as Balwadi, the centre provides education free of cost and has a nominal monthly expense of only Rs 12000. Recently four children from this centre have been successfully admitted in a school authorized by Brihanmumbai Municipal Corporation. Legal and child rights activists have also conducted constitution classes for children in the informal settlements.

== Budgetary allocations for rehabilitation ==
In 2017–2018, GBGB raised the issue of budget cuts for housing projects in the Maharashtra state budget.

== Ideology and Demands ==
The movement believes that the right to housing is a basic human right and the Government cannot deny it just on the basis of 'illegality'. It advocates the Constitution of India, fundamental rights and directive principles of state policy—which includes the constitutional guarantee of shelter and other basic services, and right to livelihood. It believes in the framework of equity and justice which is required to be the basis for development planning as a whole and housing projects in particular. It fights corruption, malpractices, and protests against the accumulation of resources like land in the hands of a few, and advocates for better implementation of laws related to slum rehabilitation. It believes that poor localities in urban areas need to be seen not as illegal encroachments but as service guilds, that slum-dwellers make vital contributions to the life of the city and thus advocates that they be involved in an equitable and inclusive urban planning and development process.
