= Mary Ann Ashford =

English cook and memoirist (1787–1870)

Mary Ann Ashford (1787–1870) was an English cook. She was born in London in 1787 as the daughter of a licensed victualler, and by 1800 was an orphan. At the age of 13, she decided to become a servant which is said to have horrified her extended family who were upwardly mobile. Ashford worked her way up to be a cook during her seventeen years as a domestic servant.

In 1844, she wrote about her second job, at the age of 16, in 1803:

"My mistress made me nurse the child, and do everything that was laborious; but all that required any art or knowledge, she not only would not let me do it, but would send me out of the way, with the little boy, while she did it herself. This was done that I should not leave her, or think myself qualified for a better place".

On 3 November 1817, Ashford married James Allison, who was a sergeant-shoemaker at the Royal Military Asylum in Chelsea, London. After having six children James Allison died and Ashford married Edward Green who was a sergeant-tailor at the Royal Military Asylum.

She published her memoirs, an account of her life as a domestic servant, Life of a Licensed Victualler's Daughter, which was published in 1844.

After the publication Ashford 'disappears from history', there seem to be no sales figures for the book and no reviews. Ashford's book has been described as "a rare and wonderful window onto servant life".
