= Criminal appeal =

Former criminal procedure in English law

An appeal was a procedure in English law to bring about a prosecution by a private party of an individual accused of a heinous crime.

== Generally ==
According to Blackstone, "[The term 'appeal'] is derived from the French, 'appeller' ... which signifies to call upon, summon or challenge one; and not ... the same as the ordinary sense of 'appeal' [from an adverse litigative result]." A private individual (the "appellor") would accuse another (the "appellee") of a crime, without the need for proceedings to be brought by the Crown. It probably descended from the system of weregild where private pecuniary satisfaction was paid to the party injured, or his relations, to expiate an enormous offense. Appeals were among the legal proceedings for which trial by combat was available.

An appeal could be used to accuse a subject of high treason. It could also be used by someone when either they or a close relation had been the victim of a crime, such as murder, rape or arson. Unlike Crown prosecutions, if a person was convicted on appeal, the Crown did not have the option of a pardon.

An acquittal following an appeal prevented any further prosecution for the same offence (the doctrine of double jeopardy), just as if the proceedings had been brought by the Crown (by indictment). The appellor would be punished with one year's imprisonment, and pay a fine to the king, besides restitution of damages to the appellee.

Appeals were likely available in American states pursuant to common law incorporation statutes, but may no longer be available. Appeals were abolished in England and Wales following the 1817 case of Ashford v Thornton where an appeal was withdrawn following the defendant requesting a trial by battle.

== See also ==
- Private prosecution
